= Yetta Kohn =

German-American businesswoman and rancher

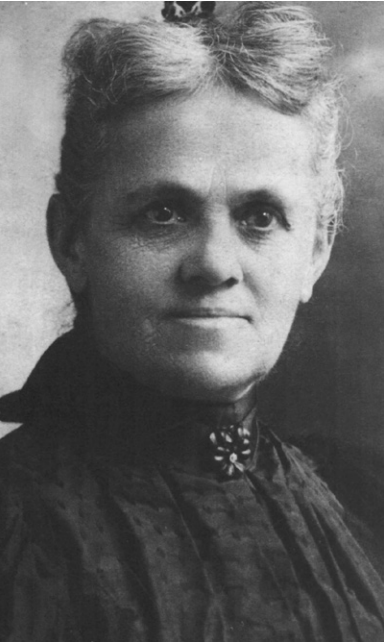
- Born: Yetta Louise Goldsmith; March 9, 1843; Bavaria, Germany
- Died: April 24, 1917 (aged 74); Montoya, New Mexico
- Occupation(s): Cattlewoman, real estate investor, businesswoman
- Children: Howard, George, Belle and Charles

Yetta Kohn (March 9, 1843 – April 24, 1917) was a German-American immigrant who came to New Mexico and became a businesswoman, rancher, and ferry operator. After her husband died in 1877, Kohn operated the family's wool and hide business. She became a real estate investor and a cattle rancher. The T4 Cattle Company ranch, which has remained a family business, in Montoya, New Mexico has become one of the largest private ranches in the United States. Besides mercantile stores, Kohn has also operated banks, a ferry, and a post office.

== Early life and marriage ==
Yetta Louise Goldsmith was born on March 9, 1843, in Bavaria, Germany. She came to the United States from Le Havre, France when she was 10, arriving in New York City on the ship William Tell in 1853. She traveled west with three family members, whose whereabouts were then unknown. According to Sharon Fried, after the age of ten, there was "no apparent parental nurturing or direction". She lived in Leavenworth of Kansas Territory by June 1860, when she lived with the Kennedys who had young children. She was 17 at the time. In 1860, (Note: They were also said to have been married in 1857, but since she lived with the Kennedys into 1860, it is likely that she was married in 1860, as indicated by other sources.) presumably after June, Goldsmith married Samuel Kohn. He was born February 2, 1837, in Pilsen, Bohemia.

== Colorado and Kansas ==
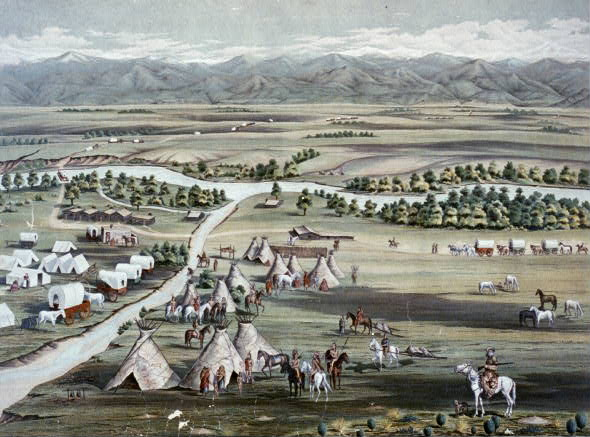
Denver in 1859 at the confluence of the Cherry Creek and South Platte Rivers

Kohn and her husband Samuel drove their covered wagon west during the Pike's Peak Gold Rush. They settled in the Cherry Creek neighborhood of Denver in 1860, where their sons Howard and George were born. Samuel advertised that he was providing food for the Fourth of July picnic at 3-Mile-Point along Cherry Creek. In May 1864, Cherry Creek was destroyed by a flood. The family returned to Leavenworth by 1865, where their daughter Belle was born. Two other infant children were born and died there. Jacob and his partner Jacob Weil sold wool and animal hides.

== New Mexico ==
After returning to Leavenworth, they ventured west about 1865 on the Santa Fe Trail to Las Vegas, New Mexico, traveling by a team of oxen. They opened a store that sold wool and hides for clothes, as well as food and wood. In 1870, Kohn, the only woman not called a homemaker in the town on the federal census, was identified as a seamstress. The couple's fourth surviving child, Charles, was born in 1871.

Inspired by Charles Ilfeld, Samuel developed an interest in cattle ranching. Kohn's husband Samuel died in Las Vegas on September 29, 1877, and was buried in the Masonic Cemetery in Las Vegas. Kohn then operated the family's wool and hide store. (Note: Sol Kohn, who visited Yetta in 1879, owned and operated the Wichita Savings Bank.) Her children ranged in ages from 7 to 17 when her husband died.

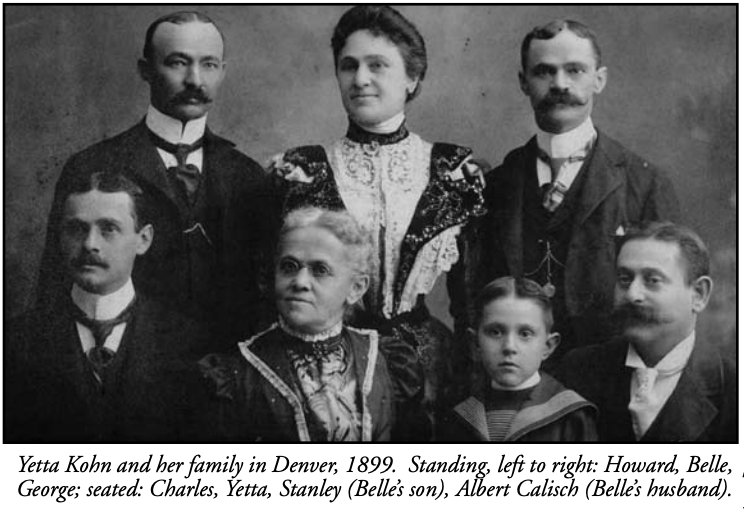
Yetta Kohn family, taken in Denver, 1899

In 1882, Kohn and her children moved to La Cinta (about 60 miles (97 km) east-southeast), a former settlement off of La Cinta Creek near what became Conchas Reservoir. She operated the 4V Ranch with about 4,000 head of cattle. The ranch had two investors, H. L. Also and Louis Sulzbacher, and was operated with her three oldest children. The cattle grazed in the Arroyo de Las Alamosas of what is now San Miguel County, New Mexico. She operated a general store and became the towns' postmistress. She founded a bank and operated a ferry across the Canadian River. She also established the Red River Social Club that offered dining, dancing, reading, and singing. Her children attended school and college away from home about 1885. In 1888, she sold her cattle to Wilson Waddingham who established Bell Ranch. Kohn was then a real estate investor who lived in Wichita, Kansas and New York.

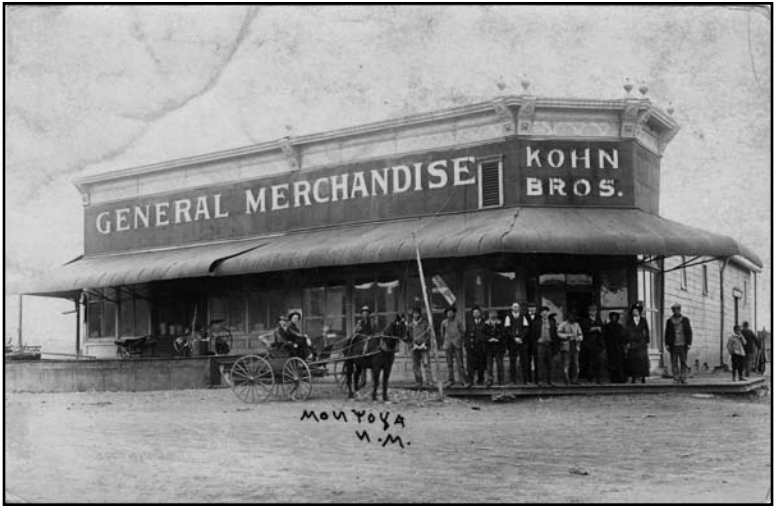
Kohn Bros. mercantile store, Montoya, c. 1908

In the first couple of years in the 20th century, Kohn and her sons returned to Las Vegas. Charles started a general store there. The Kohns moved to Rountree, a railroad stop, that soon after became the town of Montoya, New Mexico. Kohn acquired more land through the homestead act and established a cattle ranch operated by Yetta Kohn & Company. The cattle were branded 4V, and to a lesser extent, YK. They also established a land company, a mercantile business, and a bank operated by Kohn and her three sons, called Kohn Bros. Her sons lived in Las Vegas and Montoya. Yetta lived in Las Vegas, Wichita, and New York and invested in real estate in New Mexico and Kansas. Belle and her husband Senator Albert Calisch moved to Montoya by 1904 and ran their own ranch.

== Later years and death ==
In 1916, Charles was married to Hannah Bonem and died of an abscessed tooth in Kansas City while on his honeymoon. Grief-stricken by his brother's death, George died of heart failure three days later on February 3, 1916.

Kohn died on April 24, 1917, at her home in Montoya.

Howard operated the family businesses and was a real estate investor after his brothers' and mother's death. He married Clara McGowan, his bookkeeper, in 1923. They had a daughter named Yetta. Howard suffered smoke inhalation after a fire at the Kohn ranch and died in 1933. Clara operated the T4 Cattle Company after her husband's death and the ranch grew to 180,000 contiguous acres with the purchase of part of the Bell Ranch in 1946. It is now one of the largest private ranches in the United States with about 220,000 acres.

== Historical marker ==
A New Mexican historical marker was erected near the Convention Center, near the junction of NM 36 and NM 237, in Quay in remembrance of Yetta Kohn.
