= List of Benevolent and Protective Order of Elks members =

The Benevolent and Protective Order of Elks, also known as the Elks or BPOE, is an American fraternal order founded in New York City in 1868. The following is a list of some of its notable members.

== Art ==
Name	Lodge	Notability	Ref.
Harry Hershfield	New York Elks Lodge No. 1	Cartoonist known for Abie the Agent.	
Charles Marion Russell	Greater Falls, MT Lodge No. 214	Artist of the American Old West	

== Business ==
Name	Lodge	Notability	Ref.
Joseph E. Grosberg		Founder and president of Central Markets, a grocery store chain in upstate New York	
John Flint Kidder	Grass Valley Elks Club	Owner of the Northern California's Nevada County Narrow Gauge Railroad	
Howard Kohn		Businessman and owner of T4 Cattle Company,	

== Entertainment ==
Name	Lodge	Notability	Ref.
Gene Autry	Burbank, CA Lodge No. 1497	Actor, musician, singer, and composer	
Ed Begley	New York Elks Lodge No. 1	Actor who won an Academy Award for Best Supporting Actor	
Jack Benny		Comedic entertainer on radio and television	
Irving Berlin	New York Elks Lodge No. 1	Songwriter	
Leonard Bernstein	New York Elks Lodge No. 1	Conductor, composer, and winner of seven Emmy Awards, two Tony Awards, and 16 Grammy Awards	
Lew Bloom		Vaudeville performer and stage actor who popularized the comical tramp character	
Wilner Burke		Band director known for leading the Lumberjack Band	
Bruce Campbell	Ashland, OR Lodge No. 944	Actor	
Jim Cramer	Summit NJ Elks Lodge No. 1246	Host of Mad Money on CNBC	
Walter Cronkite		Broadcast journalist and anchorman for the CBS Evening News for 19 years	
Andy Devine	San Fernando, CA Elks Lodge No. 1539	Actor	
Jack Elam	Ashland, OR Lodge No. 944	Actor	
Rich Hall	Livingston, MT Lodge No. 246	Comedian, writer, documentary maker, and musician	
Bill Hughes		Jazz trombonist and bandleader	
Al Jolson	New York Elks Lodge No. 1	Singer, actor, and vaudevillian	
Martha MacCallum	Summit NJ Elks Lodge No. 1246	Journalist and news anchor for Fox News	
Paul Petersen	Gardena, CA Lodge No. 1919	Actor known for The Donna Reed Show.	
Arthur Pryor	Asbury Park Lodge No. 128	Bandleader, composer, and virtuoso trombonist in the Sousa Band	
John Philip Sousa	New York Elks Lodge No. 1	Composer and conductor known for American military marches	
Danny Thomas	Toledo, OH Lodge No. 53	Actor and comedian known for The Danny Thomas Show	
Rudy Vallée	Portland, ME Lodge No. 188	Singer, saxophonist, bandleader, actor, and entertainer	
Robert Wagner	New York Elks Lodge No. 1	Actor known for shows It Takes a Thief and Hart to Hart	
Casey Webb	Red Bank Lodge No. 233	Television series Man v. Food.	
Lawrence Welk		Bandleader and television impresario who hosted The Lawrence Welk Show	
Charles "Charlie" White		Blackface minstrel entertainer	
Tex Williams	Santa Clarita, CA Lodge No. 2379	Western swing musician	

== Law ==
Name	Lodge	Notability	Ref.
James R. Armstrong		Judge who served on the Oklahoma Court of Criminal Appeals	
James T. Hallinan		New York Supreme Court	
Oliver Wendell Holmes Jr.	New York Elks Lodge No. 1	Chief Justice of the Supreme Court of the United States	
Chester Ralph Hovey		Justice of the Washington Supreme Court	
Sherman Minton	New Albany, Indiana Lodge No. 270	Associate justice of the Supreme Court of the United States and United States Senate	
Silas Wright Porter	Kansas City, Kansas	Justice of the Kansas Supreme Court	

== Military ==
Name	Lodge	Notability	Ref.
Frederick Funston	New York Elks Lodge No. 1	United States Army general in the Spanish–American War and the Philippine–American Warl	
George W. Gibbs Jr.		United States Navy and first African-American in Antarctica	
Henry Nash		Sergeant in Theodore Roosevelt's Rough Riders during the Spanish–American War	
John J. Pershing	New York Elks Lodge No. 1	General of the Armies and commander of the American Expeditionary Forces during World War I	
Eddie Rickenbacker		Most decorated flying ace in World War I and a Medal of Honor recipient	

== Politicians ==
=== Presidents and vice presidents ===
Name	Lodge	Notability	Ref.
Alben W. Barkley		Vice President of the United States	
Dwight D. Eisenhower		President of the United States	
Gerald Ford	Grand Rapids, Michigan Lodge No. 48	President of the United States	
Warren G. Harding	Marion, Ohio Lodge No. 32	President of the United States	
John F. Kennedy	Boston, Massachusetts Lodge No. 10	President of the United States	
Franklin D. Roosevelt	Poughkeepsie, New York No. 275	President of the United States	
Harry S. Truman	Kansas City, Missouri Lodge No. 26	President of the United States	

=== Governors ===
Name	Lodge	Notability	Ref.
Fred P. Cone		Governor of Florida and Florida Senate	
Bob Ehrlich	Towson, MD Lodge No. 469	Governor of Maryland, United States House of Representatives, and Maryland House of Delegates	
John Christoph Blucher Ehringhaus		Governor of North Carolina and North Carolina House of Representatives	
Joseph Flores		Governor of Guam and founder of the Guam Daily News	
William S. Flynn		Governor of Rhode Island	
David Sholtz		Governor of Florida	
Al Smith	New York Elks Lodge No. 1	Governor of New York and New York State Assembly	
William M. Tuck	Danville, Virginia, Lodge No. 227	Governor of Virginia, Lieutenant Governor of Virginia, United States House of Representatives, Virginia Senate, and Virginia House of Delegates	

=== United States Congress ===
Name	Lodge	Notability	Ref.
William Clay Cole		United States House of Representatives and Missouri House of Representatives	
Richard E. Connell	New York Elks Lodge No. 1	United States House of Representatives	
Everett Dirksen		United States Senator and United States House of Representatives	
Barry Goldwater		United States Senate and Major General in the Air Force Reserve	
Henry M. Jackson	Everett WA Lodge No. 479	United States Senator and United States House of Representatives	
Thomas Kean Jr.	Summit NJ Elks Lodge No. 1246	United States House of Representatives, New Jersey Senate, and New Jersey General Assembly	
William Knowland	Oakland Lodge No. 171	United States Senate	
Fiorello La Guardia	New York Elks Lodge No. 1	United States House of Representatives, Mayor of New York, and the 2nd Director General of the United Nations Relief and Rehabilitation Administration	
Warren Magnuson	Seattle Lodge No. 92	United States Senator and United States House of Representatives	
John W. McCormack		Speaker of the United States House of Representatives and Massachusetts House of Representatives	
Chester L. Mize		United States House of Representatives	
John Matthew Moore	Houston Lodge, No. 151	United States House of Representatives and Texas House of Representatives	
Alexander Wiley		United States Senator	

=== State politics ===
Name	Lodge	Notability	Ref.
Harvey R. Abraham	Oshkosh Elks Club	Wisconsin State Assembly	
Lonnie O. Aulds		Louisiana House of Representatives	
Edward Francis Blewitt		Pennsylvania State Senate	
Edward H. Burke		Maryland House of Delegates	
John J. Burns		Vermont House of Representatives and Mayor of Burlington, Vermont	
David Dank		Oklahoma House of Representatives	
Miles Dewey Davis Jr.		Failed candidate for the Illinois General Assembly and father of jazz trumpeter Miles Davis.	
Claude DeBruhl		North Carolina House of Representatives	
Joe Dorman		Oklahoma House of Representatives	
Gilbert Dupre		Louisiana State Representative and District Judge for St. Landry Parish	
Charles R. Fenwick		Virginia Senate and Virginia House of Delegates	
Harry Goldstein		Florida House of Representatives	
John Grange		Kansas House of Representatives	
Jeff Harris		Missouri House of Representatives	
Jerry Kearns		Iowa House of Representatives	
Ron Kraus	Albert Lea Elks Club	Minnesota House of Representatives	
Frank J. Lonergan		Oregon House of Representatives	
LeRoy Louden		Nebraska Legislature	
William Lovenstein		President pro tempore of the Senate of Virginia	
A. J. Rosier		Wyoming Senate	
John Spiros	Marshfield Elks Club	Wisconsin State Assembly	
Edwin Orin Wood		Chairman of the Democratic National Committee of Michigan	

=== Local politics ===
Name	Lodge	Notability	Ref.
Robert E. Lee Chancey		Mayor of Tampa, Florida	
Richard J. Daley		Mayor of Chicago	
Vincent R. Impellitteri	New York Elks Lodge No. 1	Mayor of New York City and New York City Criminal Court judge	
David Levine		President of the Seattle City Council	
George P. McLain		Los Angeles City Council	
John C. Montana		Buffalo Common Council and consigliere of the Buffalo crime family	
John Edward Moran	Buffalo, NY	Mayor of Burlington, Vermont	
David Roberts		Mayor of Hoboken, New Jersey	
Winfred J. Sanborn		President of the Los Angeles City Council	
William Pruden Smith		Mayor of Miami, Florida	
Francis L. Wing		Mayor of Tampa, Florida	
Frank C. Zehrung		Mayor of Lincoln, Nebraska	

== Religion ==
Name	Lodge	Notability	Ref.
Francis Spellman	New York Elks Lodge No. 1	Archbishop of New York	

== Sports ==
Name	Lodge	Notability	Ref.
Frank Aasand		Curler, a 1972 World Men's silver medallist, and a 1972 United States men's curling champion.	
Michael Badgley	Summit NJ Elks Lodge No. 1246	Professional football player for the Detroit Lions	
Shawn Boskie		Professional baseball player for the Chicago Cubs	
Jon Condo	Philipsburg, PA Lodge No. 1173	Professional football player for the Dallas Cowboys, Oakland Raiders, Atlanta Falcons, and San Francisco 49ers	
Wuert Engelmann		Professional football player with the Green Bay Packers.	
Dan Feeney	Summit NJ Elks Lodge No. 1246	Professional football player for the Minnesota Vikings	
Whitey Ford	Queensborough, NY Lodge No. 878	Professional baseball pitcher for the New York Yankees	
Jack Fox		Professional baseball player for the Philadelphia Athletics	
Will Fries	Cranford Lodge No. 2006	Professional football player for the Indianapolis Colts	
Willis Glassgow		Professional football player	
Ray Guy	Hattiesburg, MS Lodge No. 599	Professional football player for the Oakland / Los Angeles Raiders	
August Herrmann		Executive of the Cincinnati Reds baseball team and president of National Baseball Commission	
Ned Jarrett	Newton, NC Lodge No. 2042	Race car driver, two-time NASCAR Grand National Series champion, and broadcaster	
Bobby Jones	Atlanta-North Lake Lodge No. 78	Amateur golfer who founded and helped design the Augusta National Golf Club and co-founded the Masters Tournament	
Bud Jorgensen		Athletic trainer for the Green Bay Packers	
Willie Keeler	Brooklyn, New York Lodge No. 22	Professional baseball player with the Baltimore Orioles	
King Kelly	Boston, Massachusetts Lodge No. 10	Professional baseball player and manager with the Chicago White Stockings and the Boston Beaneaters	
Al Leiter	Summit NJ Elks Lodge No. 1246	Professional baseball player the New York Yankees, Toronto Blue Jays, Florida Marlins, and New York Mets and current television sports commentator	
Vince Lombardi	Green Bay Lodge No. 259	Professional football coach and executive in the National Football League, best known as the head coach of the Green Bay Packers	
Nicholas Allan Mangold	Madison NJ Lodge No. 1465	Professional football player for the New York Jets	
Eli Manning	Summit NJ Elks Lodge No. 1246	Professional football player for the New York Giants	
Knute Rockne	South Bend,d Indiana Lodge No. 235	Football player and coach at the University of Notre Dame	
Babe Ruth	New York Elks Lodge No. 1	Professional baseball player for the Boston Red Sox and the New York Yankees	
Spec Shea	Naugatuck CT Lodge No. 967	Professional baseball player for the New York Yankees and the Washington Senators	
Monty Stickles	San Francisco Lodge No. 3	Professional football player for the San Francisco 49ers and the New Orleans Saint	
Billy Southworth	Kenton OH Lodge No. 157	Professional baseball player and manager for St. Louis Cardinals and the Boston Braves	
Ray Tauscher	Portland Elks Club	International motorcycle speedway rider	
Honus Wagner	Carnegie PA Lodge No. 831	Professional baseball player for the Pittsburgh Pirates	
Dick Weber	Florissant, MO Lodge No. 2316	Professional ten-pin bowler and founding member of the Professional Bowlers Association	
