= Howard and Clara Kohn =

American cattle ranchers

Howard Louis Kohn
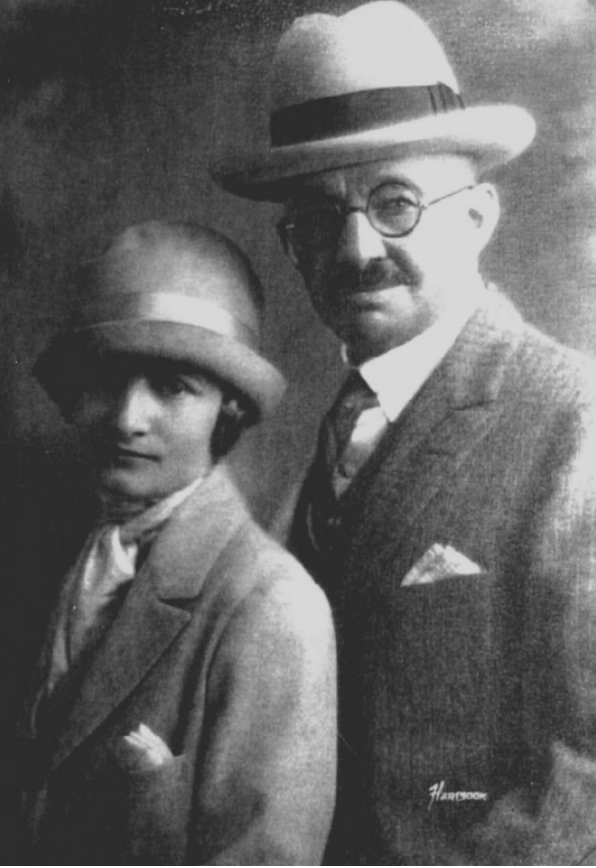
- Clara and Howard Kohn, 1923 wedding picture
- Born: November 8, 1861; Cherry Creek, Denver, Colorado
- Died: November 2, 1933 (aged 71); Tucumcari, Quay, New Mexico
- Occupations: Cattleman, banker, businessman
- Known for: Owner of T4 Cattle Company

Clara McGowan Kohn
- Born: Clara McGowan; November 20, 1899
- Died: March 7, 1988 (aged 88); Tucumcari, New Mexico
- Other names: Clara K. Hoover
- Occupations: Bookkeeper, cattlewoman, businesswoman
- Known for: Owner of T4 Cattle Company

Howard Louis Kohn (November 8, 1861 – November 2, 1933) and Clara (McGowan) Kohn (November 20, 1899 – March 7, 1988) were New Mexican businesspeople and ranchers of T4 Cattle Company, one of the largest private ranches in the United States with about 220,000 acres. They also held a hotel, banks, and mercantile shop. Howard shipped cattle on railroad cars from Texas into New Mexico in groups as large as 1,200 at a time.

== Early life and career ==
=== Howard ===
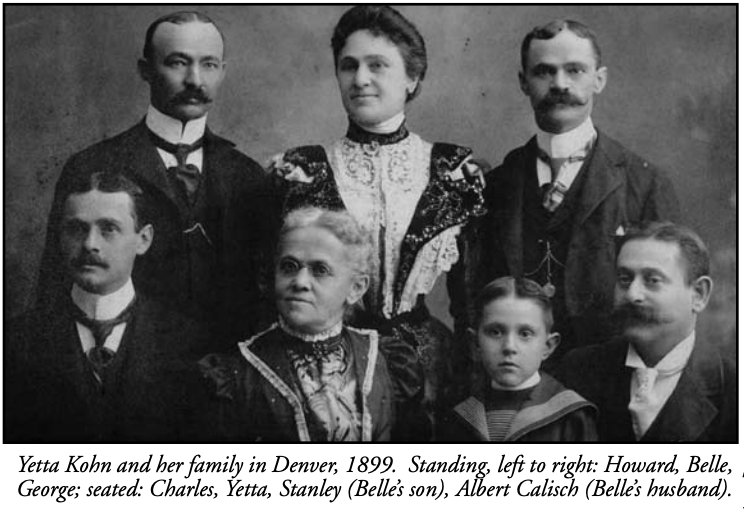
Yetta Kohn family, taken in Denver, 1899

Howard Louis Kohn was born on November 8, 1861, in the Cherry Creek area of Denver, Colorado. He was the son of immigrants Samuel and Yetta Kohn, who arrived at Cherry Creek in 1860 to prosper as businesspeople during the Pike's Peak Gold Rush. After the Cherry Creek flood of 1864, the Kohn's and their two sons, Howard and George, returned to Kansas for a few years. Howard's sister Belle was born in Kansas. The Kohns traveled by oxen-driven covered wagon to Las Vegas, New Mexico. They opened a wool and hides business. Samuel died in 1877, and Yetta took over the family business.

Yetta moved the family to the town of La Cinta (along La Cinta Creek and near present-day Conchas Dam) in 1882 and established several businesses. She operated the post office, a ferry across the Canadian River, a mercantile store, and the 4V cattle ranch, the latter of which was managed by her son Howard. The ranch was the family's main source of income. Howard, who was known as a well-dressed businessman, became a working cowboy. He castrated and branded cattle, bailed hay, and managed the cattle business. On a trip to the Texas panhandle to purchase cattle, he shared the last bed with space for another person with Billy the Kid. Howard considered the well-armed man to be "affable and square".

Yetta's children attended school and college away from home in about 1885. In 1888, she sold her cattle and ranch to Wilson Waddingham of Bell Ranch. Yetta was then a real estate investor who lived in Wichita, Kansas and New York. Around the turn of the century, Howard worked at livery stables in Denver, Colorado.

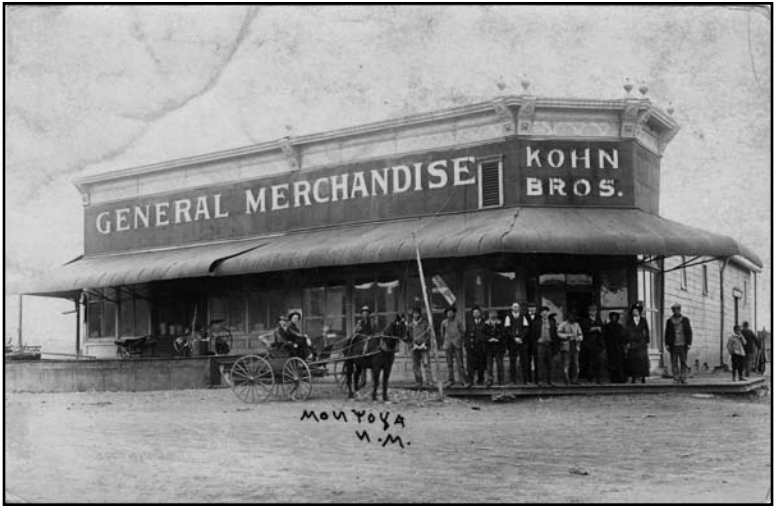
Kohn Bros. mercantile store, Montoya, c. 1908

In 1902, Howard, his mother, and siblings moved to Montoya, New Mexico, where they established several businesses. They purchased the town's mercantile business from Henry K. Rountree & Company. Howard, Charles, and George Kohn operated the Kohn Bros. Merchantile Store. Besides being a mercantile and grocery store, it traded in livestock, wool, and hides.

Although the region was in a severe drought, the Kohns bought cattle and land from Rountree. It rained heavily on the date of the sale, which signaled the end of the drought. The Kohns invested in real estate. The family received business advice from Howard's successful uncle Solomon Kohn of New York, and Howard was responsible for most family business decisions. Montoya, near the county seat of Tucumcari, New Mexico, was a railroad stop. Within ten years, Howard and his family had one the most successful ventures in eastern New Mexico. Charles, who gained experience at a store in Denver, ran the store and was the agent for the Montoya Townsite and Land Company. He was also the town's justice of peace and postmaster. The Kohns invested in banks and a hotel. They acquired land through the Homestead Act. His sister Belle and her husband Albert Calish lived in the Montoya Valley and operated their own ranch in the Mesa Rica area. Albert and Charles also entered into politics. He sold up to 1,200 cattle at a time that he bought in Texas and had shipped in railroad cars to the ranch.

A three-year drought beginning in 1909 caused homesteaders to move away from the Montoya area. The family obtained land to settle debts with the mercantile business or loans.

Howard operated the family businesses and was a real estate investor after his brothers' and mother's death. The Kohn Bros. Mercantile was renamed the Kohn Mercantile Company, with head salesman John D. Thomason managing the business. His sister and her family moved from Montoya, eventually living in El Paso, Texas.

=== Clara ===
Clara, who was born on November 20, 1899, was the daughter of Pearl McGowan and John Leonard McGowan. Her maternal grandfather, Seth L. Baker, was the head of an extended family which moved across the country with him as he engaged in speculative businesses. Clara suffered from diphtheria, dysentery, and other diseases during her childhood. While the family moved around Clara stayed in the South.

Clara's health improved as she grew up. Clara went to Indianapolis, Indiana, where she enrolled in an accounting course. She then worked in a lumber camp in Mississippi. Clara's parents moved to Montoya, New Mexico, for the drier, healthier climate. In 1919, her parents bought a hotel in town. By March, her father, who likely had tuberculosis, committed suicide after his illness worsened.

Clara, while visiting Montoya, was hired by Howard to be her bookkeeper.

== Marriage ==
Howard Kohn married Clara McGowan, his bookkeeper, in 1923. They then moved to Tucumcari, New Mexico. The Kohns had a daughter named Yetta in May 1927. After the kidnapping of Charles Augustus Lindberg Jr. (1932), Howard drove his daughter home at the end of every school day.

Among Howard's philanthropic interests, he established Camp Kohn, a girl scout camp. He was also a Mason and a founding member of the Elks Club. Howard suffered smoke inhalation and a stroke after fighting a fire at the Kohn ranch and died on November 2, 1933.

After Howard's death, in 1938, she married Dr. Thomas B. Hoover, who was a large landowner. Dr. Hoover died in 1985. Clara died on March 7, 1988.

== Howard and Clara's career ==
Howard was called the "cattle king of the Montoya Valley" after he traded his mercantile business for Vidal Ortega's land and cattle. Between 1909 and 1912, the number of cattle in Quay County, New Mexico rose from 10,000 head to 50,000 head of cattle, due to Howard's efforts. During that time, he also began using registered bulls, to improve the quality of his herds. A newspaper called Howard the "all-time leading citizen" of Quay County. Howard was an officer of local and state livestock organizations. Clara watched over the financial interests of the businesses and was a good manager. They were a major shareholder of First National Bank. He engaged in commercial lending, including partido contracts where he loaned out more than 3,000 head of cattle on the shares.

After her husband's death, Clara operated the T4 Cattle Company and other business interests. She phased out the use of partido contracts and settled loans. By 1938, the ranch had doubled in size since her husband's death. The ranch then grew to 180,000 contiguous acres with the purchase of part of the Bell Ranch in 1947. It is now one of the largest private ranches in the United States, with about 220,000 acres.

The ranch passed to Yetta Kohn Bidegain and her husband Phillip B. Bidegain. It then went to their children and grandchildren.

== Bibliography ==
- Stratton, David H. (2014). "The Jewish Founding Fathers of Tucumcari". New Mexico Historical Review. 89 (1). The Kohns of Montoya.
- Stratton, David H. (2022). Tucumcari Tonite!: A Story of Railroads, Route 66, and the Waning of a Western Town. University of New Mexico Press. ISBN 978-0-8263-6340-4.
