= Baca land grants =

The Baca land grants are five parcels of land, each almost 100,000 acres (40,000 ha, 400 km²) in area, located in New Mexico, Arizona, and Colorado. Each parcel is called a "float." They were created in 1860 by the U.S. government to compensate the Baca family for a ruling by the U.S. that invalidated the Hispanic family's ownership of a large area of land near Las Vegas, New Mexico. Each of the five floats has a distinctive history. Two remain as part of large ranches in New Mexico and Arizona, two have been incorporated into the national park system in Colorado and New Mexico, and part of one float is urbanized as Rio Rico, Arizona, an unincorporated community with a population of 20,000.

== Background ==
In 1821, Luis María Cabeza de Baca petitioned the government of Mexico for a land grant for himself and his seventeen children in an area he called Las Vegas Grandes (Big Meadows). The grant was subsequently approved. Baca, often called C. be Baca, and his employees lived on the grant land, pasturing 600 horses and mules until attacks by Plains Indians drove them away. In 1827, Baca was killed at his house in Peña Blanca by a Mexican soldier because he refused to surrender contraband beaver furs belonging to Ewing Young which were hidden in his house

In 1835, Juan de Diós Maese and 28 other men petitioned the government of New Mexico for a land grant in the same area as Las Vegas Grandes, apparently unoccupied by the Baca family heirs. The grant, called the Town of Las Vegas Land Grant, was approved and the town of Las Vegas was established. The land in the grant was later measured to be 431,654 acres (174,684 ha). The land in the Las Vegas Grandes grant conflicted with the Town of Las Vegas Land Grant. The U.S. government, after its conquest of New Mexico in 1846, added to the confusion by recognizing both grants as legitimate. As it was deemed impractical to expel 2,200 residents living on grant land, in 1860 the U.S. resolved the dispute by confirming the Town of Las Vegas Land Grant, but offering compensation to the Baca family heirs of an equivalent amount of unowned land.

The heirs of Luis Maria Cabeza de Baca chose attorney and land speculator John Sebrie Watts to make the selection of the land to be granted to the Baca family. Watts chose to claim five areas, each approximately 12.5 miles (20.1 km) square and each later measured at 99,289 acres (40,181 ha) (155 sqmi) in size. Two of the areas were in the future state of New Mexico, one was in Colorado, and two were in Arizona. These areas were called the "Baca Floats", numbers one through five. Watts subsequently bought Floats 2,3, and 4 from the Bacas for $3,000, about one cent per acre, and Float 5 for $6,800. A float is defined as "a government grant of a fixed amount of land not yet located by survey out of a larger specific tract." The Baca grants were "floated" (relocated) from the location of the original Las Vegas land grant. The Baca Floats are also called Baca Locations, numbers one through five.

== Baca Float No. 1 ==
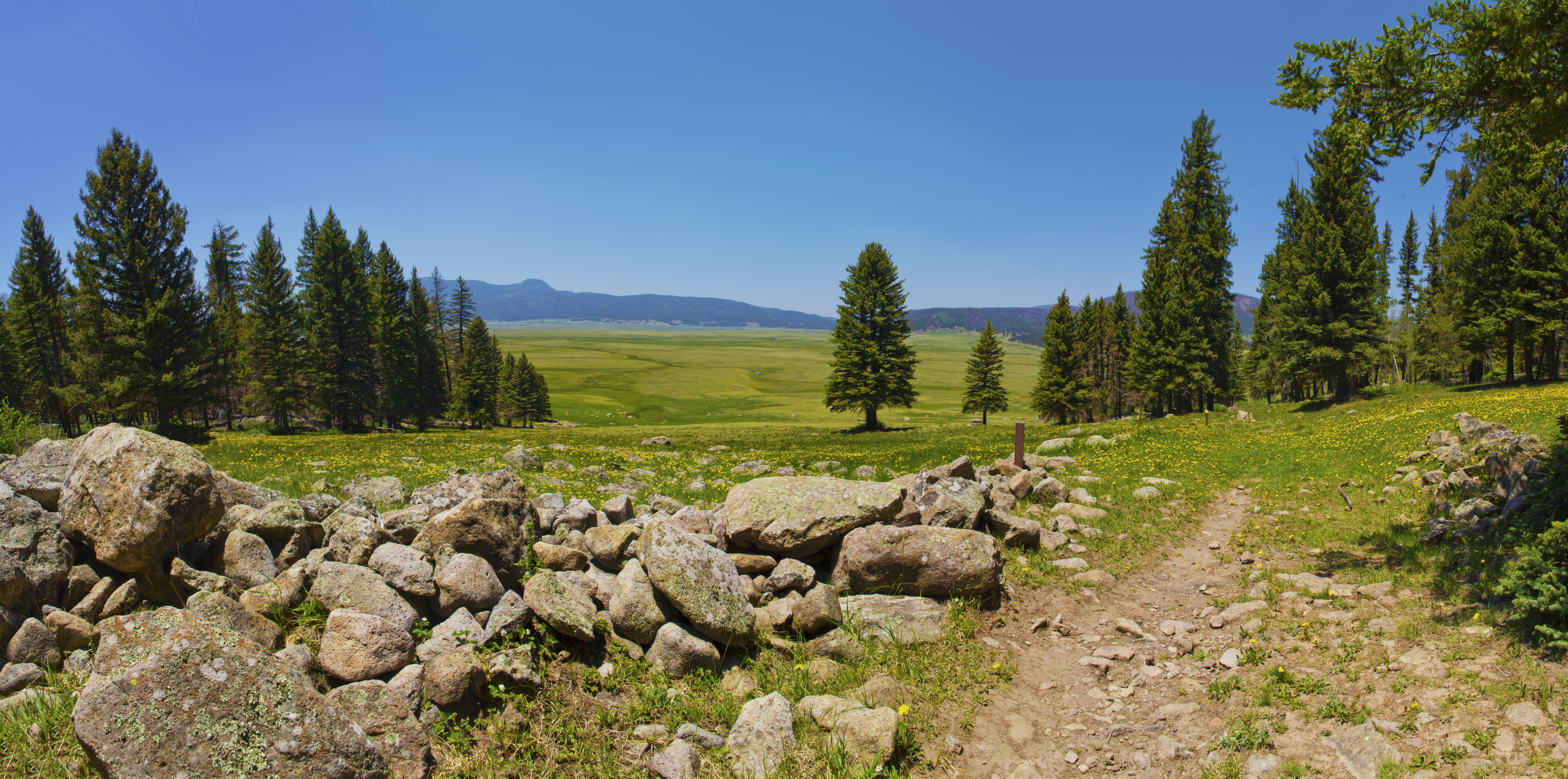
Valles Caldera in the Baca Float No. 1.

Baca Float No. 1 is located in the Jemez Mountains, reaching from about 5 miles (8.0 km) west of the present day city of Los Alamos, New Mexico, to the east to near Jemez Springs on the west. Members of the Baca family owned all or part of the grant until the 1890s. In 1899, Mariano Otero, a member of the Santa Fe Ring of land speculators, acquired all the grant land, setting up the Valles Land Company. In 1909 an Otero heir sold the grant land to the Redondo Development Company, headquartered in Warren, Pennsylvania, for 400,000 dollars. In 1926, two Bond brothers, George W. and Frank, purchased the grant although the Redondo company retained rights to lumbering on the property. In 1963, the Bond family sold the grant to James Patrick Dunigan for 2.5 million dollars.

Attempts had been made since the early 1900s to acquire the grant land as a national park. Those efforts resulted in the sale of the 95,000 acres (38,000 ha, 380 km²) owned by Dunigan to the U.S. government in 2000 for 101 million dollars. Valles Caldera National Preserve, consisting of 89,766 acres (36,327 ha, 363 km²), was established. 5,000 acres (2,000 ha, 20 km²) of the grant land was allocated to the Santa Clara Pueblo and 300 acres (120 ha, 1.2 km²). became part of Bandelier National Monument. The average elevation of Valles Caldera is more than 8,000 ft (2,400 m). Most of the preserve has a humid, warm summer, cold winter (Dfb) climate (Dfc). Economic activities on the grant were timber harvesting and seasonal grazing of cattle and sheep. The land was much degraded by those activities during the 20th century.

== Baca Float No. 2 ==
Baca Float No. 2 is located on the semi-arid High Plains north of Tucumcari, New Mexico along the Canadian River. Its history is entwined with the history of the larger, adjacent Pablo Montoya land grant. Comanche and Kiowa raids prevented its settlement until the 1870s when the two grants were purchased by a Canadian land speculator named Wilson Waddingham. In 1889 the Bell Ranch was established on grant lands and, after changing hands several times, the ranch has lasted into the 21st century as one of the largest privately owned parcels of land in the United States. The Bell Ranch is 290,100 acres (117,400 ha) in size. It was last sold to Liberty Media's CEO, John Malone, in 2010 for 83 million dollars.The ranch is primarily used for grazing cattle on its extensive grasslands.

== Baca Float No. 3 ==
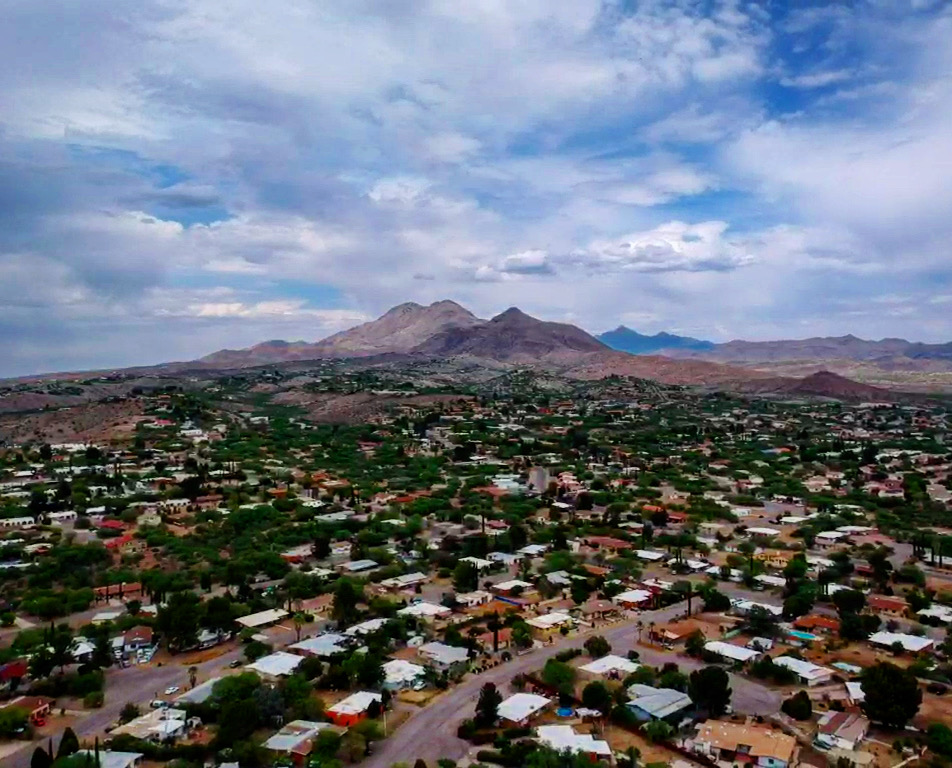
The community of Rio Rico, Arizona occupies some of the former float land.

Baca Float No. 3 is in Santa Cruz County in southern Arizona. Watts selected the grant area in the valley of the Santa Cruz River and the Santa Rita Mountains. The grant was controversial from the beginning. The float violated the U.S. government's requirement that land in the floats be unoccupied and lack mining potential. Baca Float No. 3 was already populated, containing the communities of Tumacacori, Calabasas (now Rio Rico), Sonoita, and part of Tubac. Most of the inhabitants were Hispanics or Tohono O'odham Indians. Moreover, land in Float No. 3 overlapped earlier land grants awarded by the Mexican government. Nevertheless, the U.S. government approved the float in 1864. Watts sold the land to William Wrightson, president of a mining company, for 110,000 dollars. Wrightson was killed in 1866 by Apache Indians while attempting to survey the land. The exact location and dimensions of the float remained in dispute until the Department of the Interior made a final determination in 1899.

A number of ownership changes occurred and the land speculators attempted to evict the settlers living on the grant lands. In 1908 the Surveyor General of the United States recommended the invalidation of Baca Float No. 3 because the land had been occupied and contained minerals prior to the grant. The Department of the Interior opened the area to additional homesteaders. However, the speculators, who claimed to own all the land in the float, carried their opposition to the invalidation of the float to the Supreme Court. In 1914, the Supreme Court agreed with the speculators that Baca Float No. 3 was legal and that the settlers and homesteaders had no claim to the land they occupied. In 1917, U.S. Marshalls evicted more than 150 people from land some had lived on for decades. The evictions allegedly were brutal with eviction notices served at night, families immediately expelled, and houses emptied of furnishings. In 1921, the U.S. Congress granted relief to those evicted by passing a law which authorized the evicted people to claim new lands. Legal disputes about the land in the float continued until 1977. Much of the land in the former float is now in the Rio Rico community which had a population of 20,000 in 2020.

== Baca Float No. 4 ==
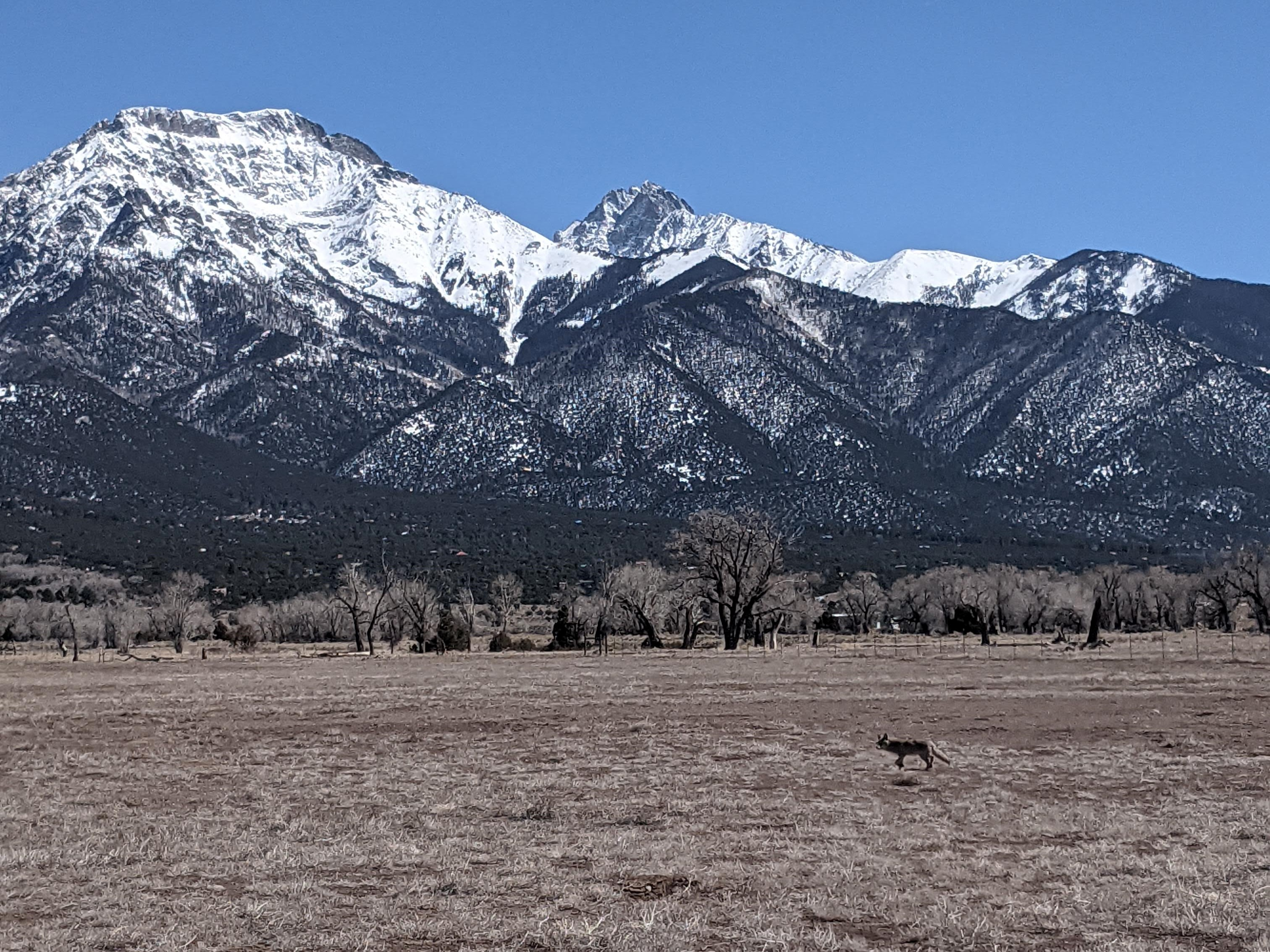
The Baca Wildlife Refuge with the Sangre de Cristo Mountains in the background.

Baca Float No. 4 is located in the San Luis Valley of Colorado. The climate is arid and, with an elevation of about 7,500 ft (2,300 m), the feasibility for agriculture is mostly for cattle grazing. In the 1870s, silver and gold miners rushed into the area. In 1898, the Supreme Court affirmed the ownership of the San Luis Valley and Mining Company's ownership of the float. Squatters were evicted by the company. Mining, never very profitable, ceased during the early 1900s.

The grant was intact as a cattle ranch in 2002 when the Nature Conservancy purchased it for 31 million dollars. The land was converted into parts of the Great Sand Dunes National Park and the Baca National Wildlife Refuge.

== Baca Float No. 5 ==
Located in Arizona's Yavapai County, the Baca Float No. 5 is located in desert and semi-arid country at elevations ranging from 4,000 ft (1,200 m) to 7,500 ft (2,300 m) about 35 miles (56 km) south of Seligman, Arizona. Eighty-six heirs of Luis Maria Cabeza de Baca sold the float to John S. Watts for 6,800 dollars in 1871. The float land went through a number of different owners until 1936 when the Greene Cattle Company bought it in its entirety. Two years later the company bought an adjoining 157,000 acres (64,000 ha) ranch and combined the two properties into the O RO ranch of 257,000 acres (104,000 ha). The Greene family owned the ranch until 1973 when it was purchased by the JJJ Corporation owned by John N. Irwin II. After his death in 2000, management of the ranch passed to his son and daughter.

The ranch is located in a remote and rugged region. The O RO ranch is the largest contiguous piece of privately owned land in Arizona and is noted for raising Quarter Horses and using them for herding cattle on the ranch.
