= Jasenko Đorđević =

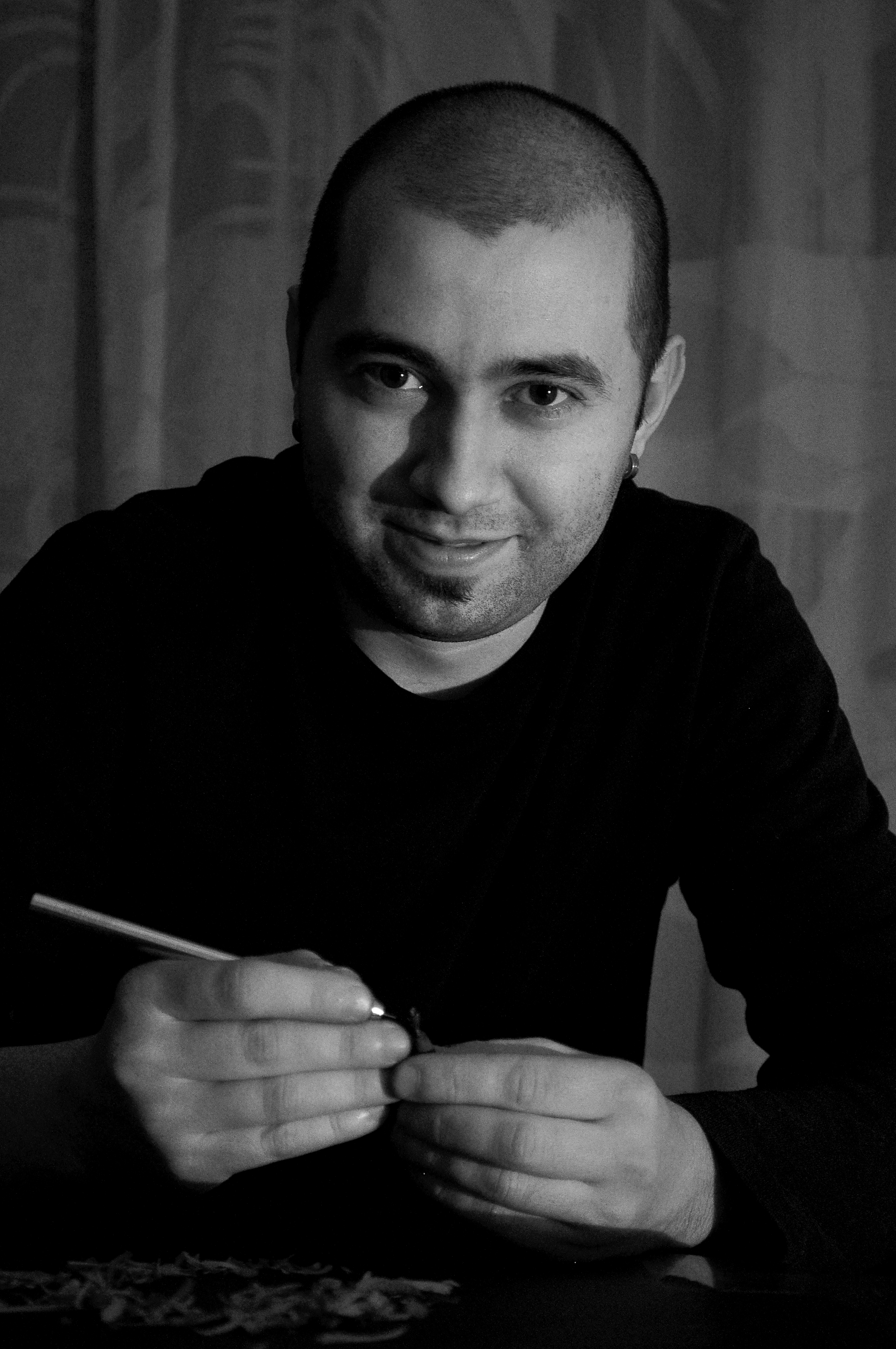
- Photo of Jasenko Đorđević by Zijah Jusufović (2013).
- Born: Jasenko Đorđević; 9 June 1983; Tuzla, Bosnia and Herzegovina,
- Known for: Sculpture
- Notable work: Mother and Child: Newborn; On the Edge; The Creation of Adam; The Train
- Awards: Purchase awards at 7th biennial of miniature art Bosnia and Herzegovina Tuzla 2013; Pollock-Krasner Foundation Grant, 2019
- Website: https://toldart.com

Jasenko Đorđević (pronounced [Yasénko d͡ʑɔ̝̌ːrd͡ʑe̞vit͡ɕ]), born June 9, 1983, in Tuzla, Bosnia and Herzegovina, is an artist specializing in creating miniature sculptures on the tips of graphite pencils. Known under the pseudonym TOLDart, Đorđević is a self-taught artist.

His work reflects life philosophy, demonstrating strength and flexibility through the delicate process of carving. Đorđević's artistic approach has been recognized and awarded internationally, including prestigious awards such as the Grand Prix and Sculpture Award at the international exhibition 'Biennale of Miniature Art BiH.' in 2013. Early in 2019, he also received the prestigious Pollock-Krasner Foundation Grant.

Đorđević's work has been recognized and exhibited in several countries including France, England, China, the United States, and Belgium. His sculptures are part of the permanent collection at the Cumberland Pencil Museum in the United Kingdom, demonstrating his global presence and recognition in the art world.

== Commencement ==
In January 2010, his brother sent him a link with the artworks of an American artist called Dalton Ghetti, who at that time was the only artist known for creating this type of miniature sculptures, and challenged him to try and make something similar. He liked the idea and accepted the challenge. The very next day, he sent his brother a sculpture with a note saying 'I told you so'. This first contact with graphite as a medium was enchanting for Jasenko. The tiny dimensions of the pencil, usually between 2 and 5mm in diameter, presented a unique and delicate challenge. The brittleness of graphite demanded precision and patience.

As a child he used to make small books (about 5mm), small sculptures, and micro-origami. He made one origami figure for the Guinness Book of World Records. It was a paper boat about 1.5mm by 2.5mm but the dimensions of the boat itself were about 1mm. Although it didn't make it into the Guinness Book of World Records due to certain technical issues, the officials at Guinness confirmed that they had no record of a similar feat, acknowledging the uniqueness of his work.

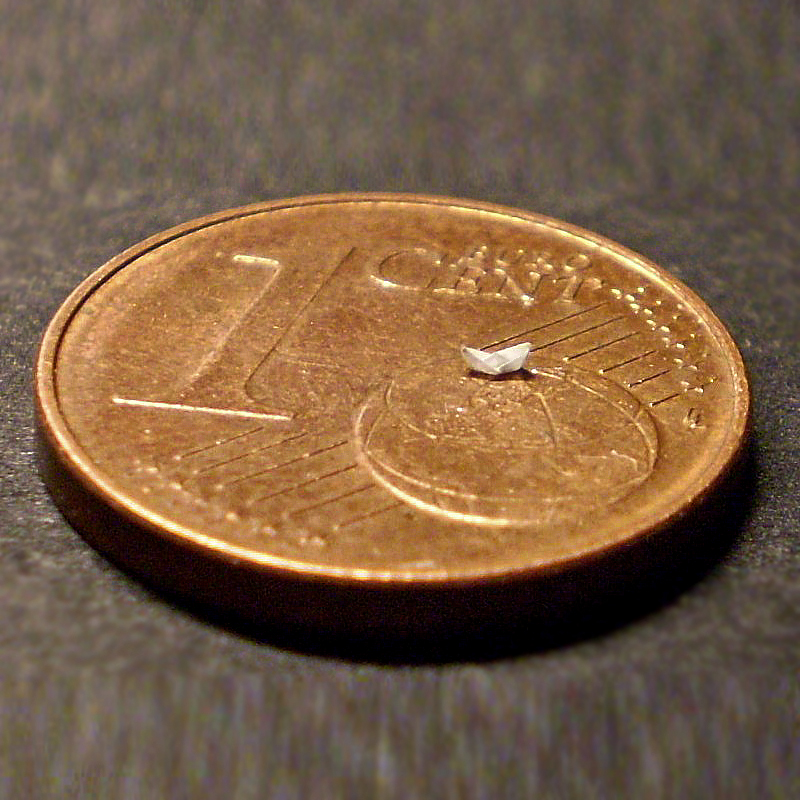
This delicate origami boat, perched upon a Euro cent, exemplifies the precision and scale of Jasenko Đorđević's work, echoing his Guinness World Record attempt for the smallest paper folding.

Đorđević's work has attracted the attention of numerous prestigious media houses, including CNN, Deutsche Welle (DW), Reuters, and many others, showcasing the widespread interest and acclaim his miniature pencil sculptures have garnered globally.

== Sculptures ==
Working primarily on standard pencils with diameters ranging from 2 to 5mm and graphite hardness between HB and 2H, his themes are diverse, encapsulating philosophical musings, historical moments, and snapshots of life.

His works have garnered significant attention online, as well as in group and solo exhibitions.

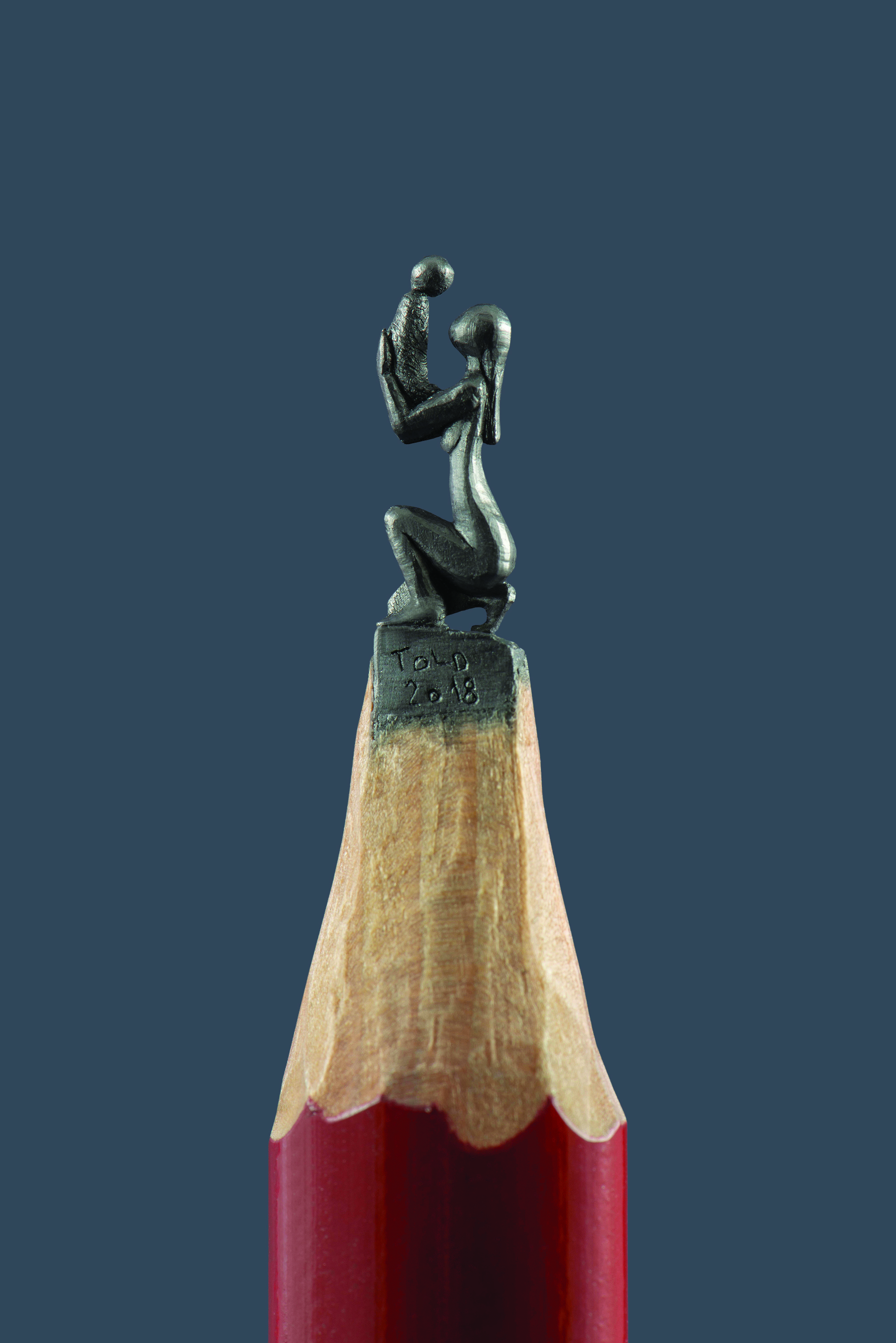
"Mother and Child: Newborn" by Jasenko Đorđević

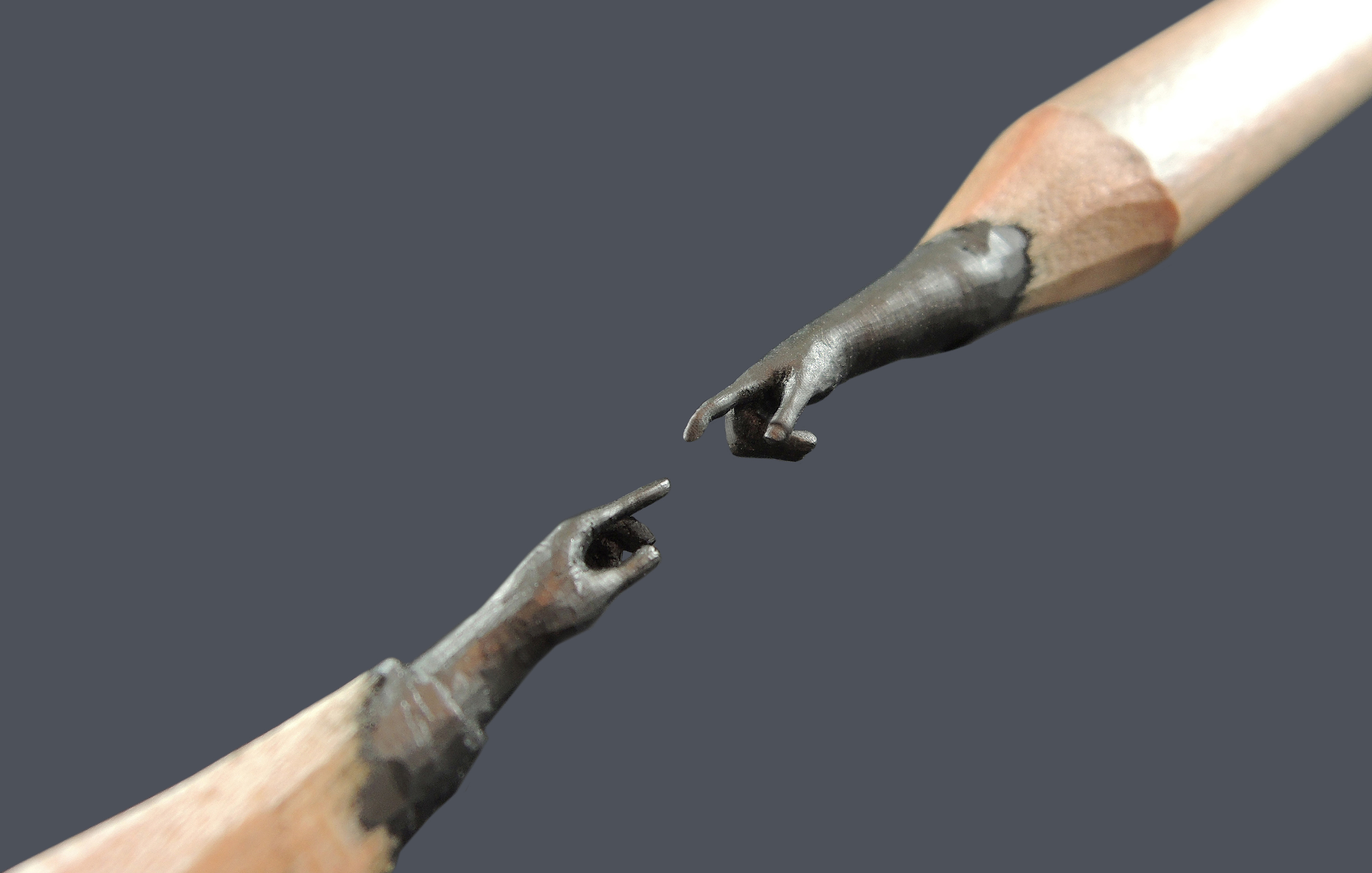
"The Creation of Adam" by Jasenko Dordevic

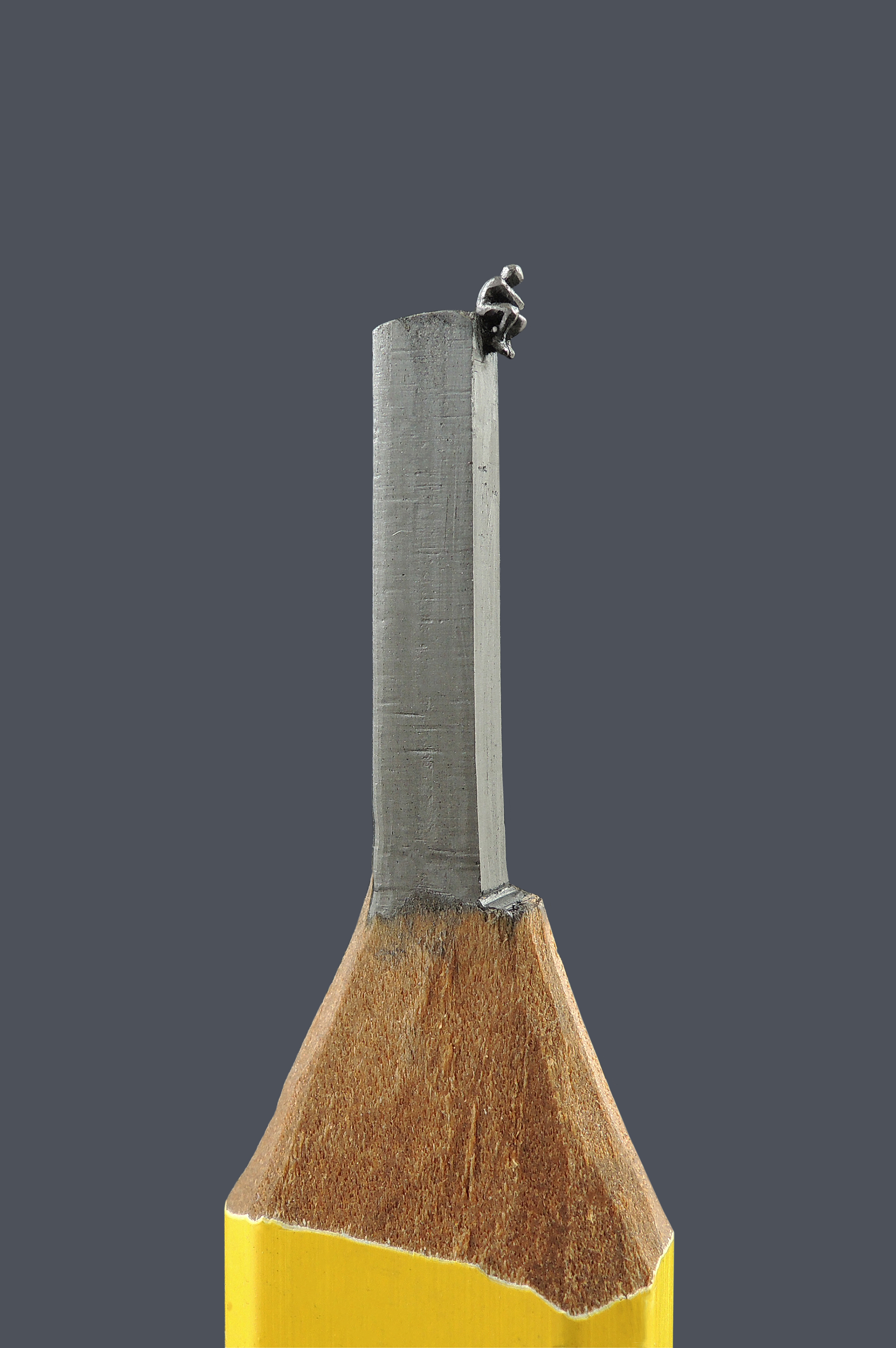
"On the Edge" by Jasenko Dordevic

== Exhibitions ==
=== Solo exhibitions ===
- 2014 Tuzla Bosnia and Herzegovina Bosnian Cultural Center of Tuzla Canton
- 2015 Kalesija Bosnia and Herzegovina Bosnian Cultural Center Kalesija
- 2015 Tuzla Bosnia and Herzegovina Peace Flame House Tuzla
- 2016 Sarajevo Bosnia and Herzegovina Unon Bank˙s Exhibition space
- 2016 Mjøndalen Norway Portåsen - Wildenveys Rike
- 2018 Tuzla Bosnia and Herzegovina Atelier Gallery "TOLDart"
- 2018 Tuzla Bosnia and Herzegovina Youth Theater Tuzla
- 2018 Drammen Norway Buskerud Kunstsenter
- 2021 Gradac Croatia Municipal Library "Hrvatska sloga"
- 2022 Tuzla Bosnia and Herzegovina International Atelier “Ismet Mujezinović”
- 2022 Zavidovici Bosnia and Herzegovina The Culture Center Zavidovići
- 2023 Ningbo China 3rd CEEC Expo
- 2023 Hangzhou China 17th Hangzhou Cultural and Creative Industry EXPO

=== Awards ===
- 2013 Grand Prix Award, 7th biennial of miniature art Bosnia and Herzegovina
- 2013 Sculpture Award, 7th biennial of miniature art Bosnia and Herzegovina
- 2019 Pollock-Krasner Foundation Grant
