= Montoya, New Mexico =

Unincorporated community in Quay County, New Mexico, United States

- Unincorporated community
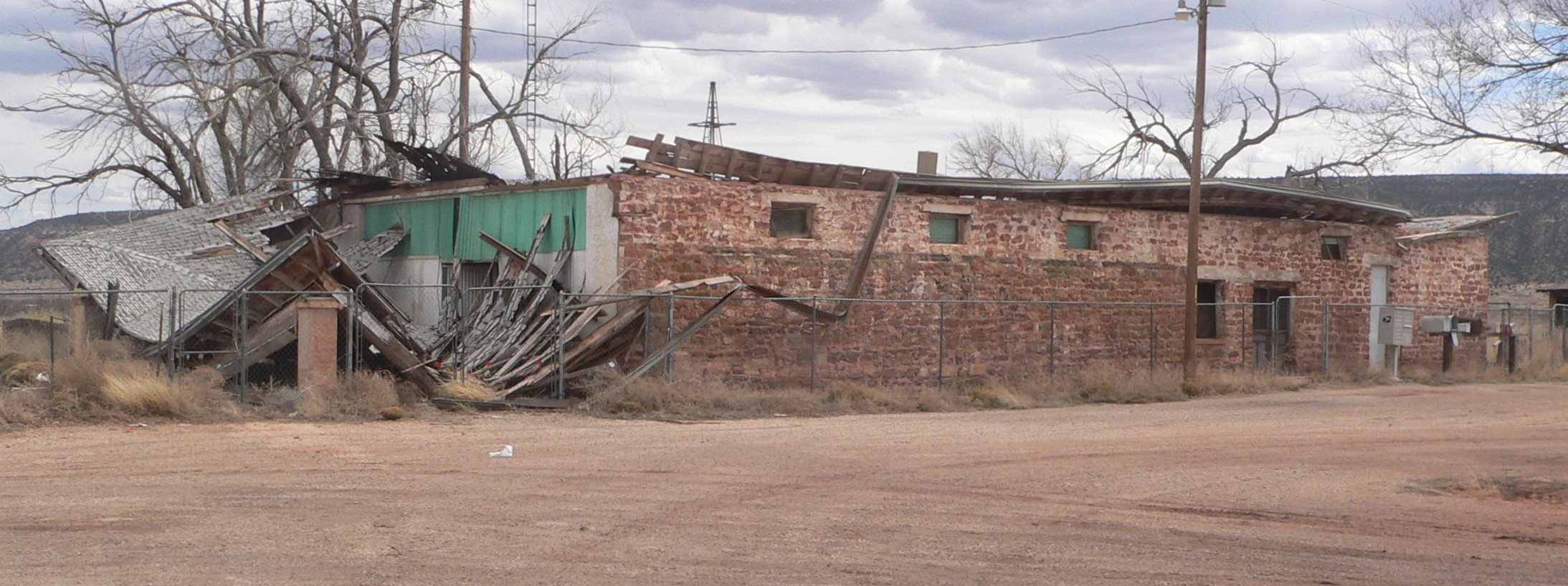
- Richardson store, 2015

- Location within New Mexico Location within the United States
- Coordinates: 35°05′59″N 104°03′50″W
- Country: United States
- State: New Mexico
- County: Quay
- Elevation: 4,321 ft (1,317 m)
- Time zone: UTC-7 (Mountain (MST))
  - Summer (DST): UTC-6 (MDT)
- Area code: 575
- GNIS feature ID: 915865

Montoya is an unincorporated community on the route of historic Route 66 in Quay County, New Mexico, United States. It is the site of the Richardson Store, which is listed on the National Register of Historic Places.

Montoya was founded as a railroad stop and loading point in 1902. It was about that time that widow Yetta Kohn and her sons, Howard, George, and Charles established the T4 Cattle Company ranch, a store, a bank, and a land company in Montoya. Yetta's daughter-in-law, Clara Kohn operated the T4 Cattle Company after her husband Howard's death and the ranch grew to 180,000 contiguous acres with the purchase of part of the Bell Ranch in 1946. As of 2023, it is one of the largest private ranches in the United States with about 220,000 acres.

A Sinclair gasoline station operated from 1925 to the mid-1970s. The now-abandoned Casa Alta stone structure was the home of Maria and Tylvan Hendren.
