= Derwent Cumberland Pencil Company =

English art materials brand

Derwent
- Formerly: Banks, Son & Co. Derwent Cumberland Pencil Co.
- Company type: Private (1832–1980)
- Industry: Art materials
- Founded: 1832
- Fate: Acquired by ACCO Brands in 1980, becoming a brand
- Headquarters: Workington, England
- Area served: Worldwide
- Products: Pencils, paints, art blocks, pastels, pens, art accessories
- Owner: ACCO Brands
- Website: derwentart.com

Derwent Cumberland Pencil Company, trading as Derwent, is an English brand of pencils and other art materials. The business began in 1832 in Cumberland under the name Banks, Son & Co.. Pencil manufacture in the Keswick area developed in the nineteenth century using local Borrowdale graphite. The company later became the Derwent Cumberland Pencil Company. In 1980, it was acquired by the US corporation ACCO Brands, then known as Rexel, and became one of its brands.

== History ==
In the early 19th century, Keswick was well known for pencil production. In 1832, Banks, Son & Co. opened a pencil factory in the area. The business later passed through several owners before becoming the Derwent Cumberland Pencil Company in 1916.

== Products ==
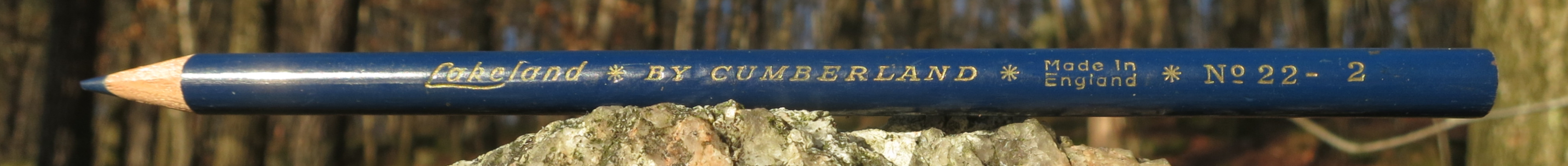
Blue ca. 1970 Lakeland pencil by Derwent Cumberland Pencil Company

Derwent produces a range of art materials including coloured pencils, graphite pencils, water soluble pencils, pens, paints, pastels, and accessories. Its product lines have included Artist, Studio, Watercolour, Pastel, Coloursoft, Inktense, Lightfast, and Procolour.

== Awards ==
Derwent received a Queen's Award for Enterprise. In 2002, The Cumberland Pencil Co., then described as a division of Acco UK Ltd, received the award in the Sustainable Development category for its solvent free paint application systems. In 2014, Derwent received the Environmental & Energy Awareness Award at the CN Business Awards.

== Pencil Museum ==
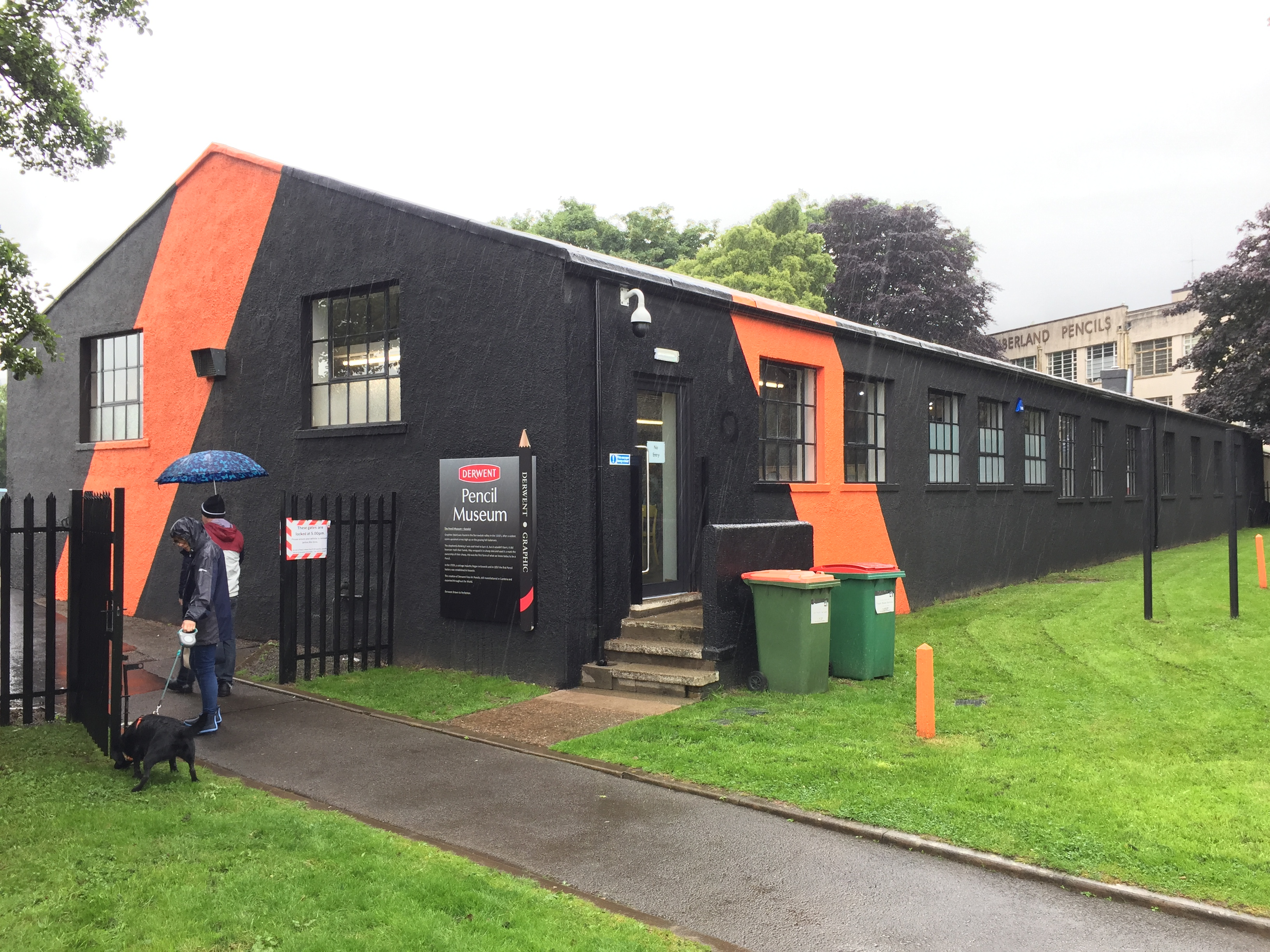
Derwent Pencil Museum

Derwent is historically associated with the Derwent Pencil Museum in Keswick, which covers the history of pencil manufacturing in the Lake District.
