= Robert Lougheed =

- Born: May 27, 1910; Massey, Ontario, Canada
- Died: June 3, 1982 (aged 72)
- Occupation: Artist

Robert Lougheed (May 27, 1910 – June 3, 1982) was a Canada-born American artist who has specialized in images of the American West.

== Biography ==
Lougheed was born and raised on a farm in Massey, Ontario, Canada, the son of Robert James Lougheed and Ada Lougheed. He became an illustrator for mail-order catalogues and for the Toronto Star, but studied in his spare time at the Ontario College of Art and then at the École des Beaux-Arts de Montréal. He went to New York City at the age of twenty-five as the pupil of Frank Vincent DuMond and Dean Cornwell at the Art Students League. However he continued to work as an illustrator for over 30 years and his work appeared in magazines such as National Geographic and Reader's Digest. Lougheed's work as a commercial artist included the Mobil Oil logo of the red flying horse.

He explored the American West, particularly the old Bell Ranch in New Mexico, and many of his paintings were inspired by the scenery and animals of the region. Consequently, in 1970, he was commissioned by the United States Post Office Department to design the six-cent buffalo stamp for their Wildlife Conservation Series.

Lougheed illustrated children's books such as the horse novels Mustang and San Domingo by Marguerite Henry and The Bell Ranch As I Knew It by George F. Ellis. He also illustrated books by Martha Downer Ellis, about Bell Ranch, including Bell Ranch Sketches, Bell Ranch People and Places and Bell Ranch Recollections. He won multiple awards at both the National Academy of Western Art and the Cowboy Artists of America. Some of his work is in the Cowboy Hall of Fame in Oklahoma City, Oklahoma.

Lougheed's interest in art extended to the founding of the National Academy of Western Art at the National Cowboy Hall of Fame. He continued to serve as an advisor to the academy for many years. He also worked voluntarily as a teacher to many young painters. Outside of art, Lougheed was an avid tournament badminton player who won a number of regional and Connecticut state doubles titles.

Lougheed married Cordelia "Cordy" Ervin in 1959. He died in 1982, at the age of 72.

== Legacy ==
In December 2007, the Lougheed Studio at Claggett/Rey Gallery opened in Vail, Colorado. The Studio is devoted to the life and legacy of Lougheed. In January 2010, Robert Lougheed: Follow the Sun was published, chronicling the life and career of the artist.
