= Jack Chatfield =

American politician

Member of the New Mexico House of Representatives from the 67th district
- Incumbent
- Assumed office January 15, 2019
- Preceded by: Dennis Roch

Personal details
- Born: Truth or Consequences, New Mexico, U.S.
- Party: Republican
- Spouse: Jill
- Children: 5

Jack "Jackey" Chatfield is an American politician, businessman, and rancher, currently serving as a member of the New Mexico House of Representatives. Elected in 2019, Chatfield represents the 67th district, which includes Tucumcari, New Mexico, Ute Lake State Park, and Clayton Lake State Park.

== Early life ==
Chatfield was born in Truth or Consequences, New Mexico.

== Career ==
Prior to serving in the New Mexico House of Representatives, Chatfield worked as a rancher at Bell Ranch. He currently owns and operates a Headquarters Restaurant in Mosquero, New Mexico. Chatfield took office on January 15, 2019, succeeding Dennis Roch. He is a member of the Republican Party.

== Personal life ==
Chatfield is married and has five children.
