= Silver Spur Ranches =

Ranch company

Coordinates: 41.2566°N 106.8319°W

Silver Spur Ranch is a company owned by John Malone and headquartered at Encampment, Wyoming. Founded in the 1950s, it has ranches in Colorado and northern New Mexico. It owns the TO Ranch in northern New Mexico. In 2010, it purchased Bell Ranch, a large cattle ranch in New Mexico. In Colorado, it owns cattle ranches in Kiowa and Walden.

As of 2010, it had 12,000 cows. It breeds with Hereford, Angus, Red Angus, Charolais, and Rangefire bulls, which is a composite of Red Angus and Charolais bulls.
