= Cosmo Films =

Indian multinational corporation

Cosmo Films Ltd.
- Type: Public
- Traded as: BSE: 508814; NSE: COSMOFILMS
- Industry: Manufacturing, plastics
- Founded: 1976; 50 years ago
- Founder: Ashok Jaipuria
- Headquarters: New Delhi, India
- Area served: Worldwide
- Key people: Pankaj Poddar (Group CEO); Neeraj Jain (CFO)
- Products: BOPP Film, Polypropylene Film, Synthetic paper, Packaging and labeling
- Website: https://www.cosmofilms.com/

Cosmo Films (Now Cosmo First Limited) is an Indian multinational corporation that manufactures bi-axially oriented polypropylene films (BOPP) for packaging, label, lamination and industrial applications. The company is headquartered in New Delhi, India. Its manufacturing units are situated in India and South Korea. The company is listed on the Bombay Stock Exchange (BSE) and National Stock Exchange (NSE), India. Mr. Ashok Jaipuria founded Cosmo Films Limited in October 1976 and set up the first production plant at Aurangabad, Maharashtra in the year 1981. In 2001, Cosmo Films acquired a 76.51% stake in Gujarat Propack Limited. In 2009, Cosmo Films acquired US-based GBC Commercial Print Finishing for USD 17.1 million (about Rs. 82 crore).

== Operations ==
Cosmo Films' major subsidiaries:

- Cosmo Films Korea Limited. Korea
- CF (Netherlands) Holdings Limited B.V. Netherlands
- Cosmo Films SP. Z.O.O. Poland
- Cosmo Films Singapore Pte. Ltd. Singapore
- CF Investment Holding Private (Thailand) Company Limited. Thailand

== Products ==
1. Packaging Films
2. BOPP Films
3. Label Films
4. Synthetic Paper
5. Barrier Films
6. Lamination Films
7. In Mould Label Films
8. Wrap Around Label Films
9. Sustainable Solutions

== Structure ==
=== Management ===
- Pankaj Poddar, Group CEO
- Neeraj Jain, Chief Financial Officer (CFO)

=== Board of directors ===
As of December 2024, Cosmo Films' Board of directors consisted of the following directors;

- Mr. Ashok Jaipuria (Chairman & Managing Director)
- Mr. A.K. Jain (Director of Corporate Affairs)
- Mr. H.K. Aggarwal (Independent Director)
- Mr. Rakesh Nangia, Founder and Managing Partner, Nangia & Co LLP and Chairman of Nangia Andersen India (Independent Director)
