= Richardson Store =

- U.S. National Register of Historic Places
- NM State Register of Cultural Properties
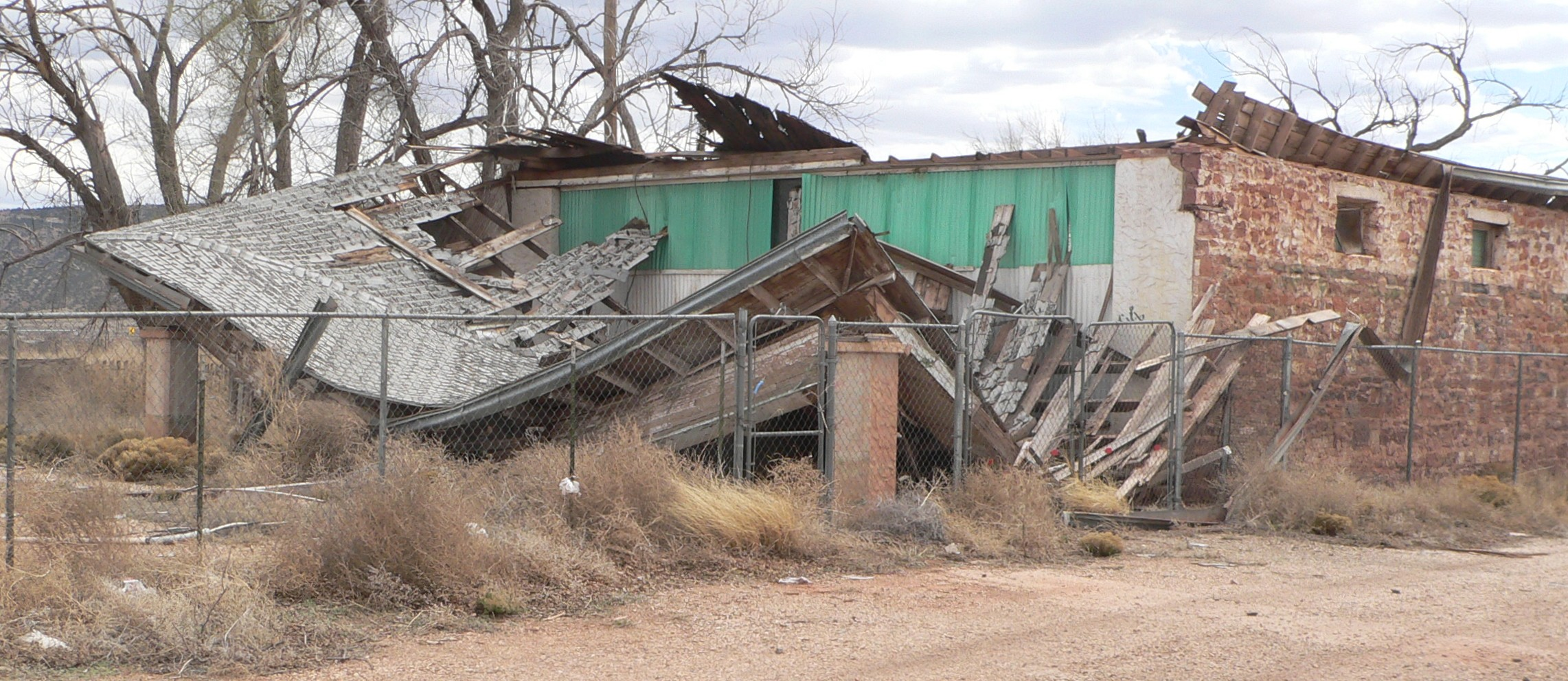
- Collapsed porch at north end of building, 2015

- Location within New Mexico Location within the United States
- Location: Off I-40, Montoya, New Mexico
- Coordinates: 35°5′43″N 104°3′53″W
- Area: 1 acre (0.40 ha)
- Built: 1928
- NRHP reference No.: 78001819
- NMSRCP No.: 525

Significant dates
- Added to NRHP: November 16, 1978
- Designated NMSRCP: September 24, 1977

The Richardson Store, located off I-40 in Montoya, New Mexico, is a historic Route 66 fixture. It served tourists and other travelers. It was listed on the National Register of Historic Places in 1978.

The store was started by G.W. Richardson in 1908, in a wooden structure. In 1918, he relocated the store to the red sandstone building that survives today, while the state of New Mexico improved the roadway. The roadway became part of U.S. Route 66 in New Mexico. The store thrived in the 1920s, 1930s, and 1940s.

Interstate 40 came through, a few hundred yards to the south, in 1956. Although there is an exit, the speed of traffic greatly reduced stops, and the store and Montoya declined. The store eventually closed and has been vacant for many years. In 2014, the building's roof collapsed.

== See also ==
- National Register of Historic Places listings in Quay County, New Mexico
