= Harvey Caplin =

- Born: Harvey Harold Caplin; July 21, 1915
- Died: November 14, 1984 (aged 69); Albuquerque, New Mexico
- Other name: Harvey H. Caplin
- Education: Rochester Institute of Technology
- Occupation: Free-lance photographer of the American Southwest
- Spouse: Grace Morton (m. 1940)

Harvey Caplin (July 21, 1915 – November 14, 1984) was an American freelance photographer of Albuquerque, New Mexico. His work spanned the American Southwest, but centered primarily on images of scenic and historical significance within the state of New Mexico. He documented the working life of cowboys on Bell Ranch, the lives of Native Americans, and landmarks.

== Personal life and education ==
Harvey Harold Caplin was born on July 21, 1915, in Rochester, New York to Yetta and David Chaplin. His father was an immigrant from Germany. He had a brother Albert and a sister Inez. Caplin was raised in Rochester. He graduated with an applied arts degree from Rochester Institute of Technology.

Caplin married Grace Morton of Elmira, New York on May 30, 1940, and lived in Rochester after their marriage. They had a daughter and son, Abbie and Lee.

During World War II, he served the United States Army Air Forces and was stationed in Albuquerque, New Mexico at the Kirtland Air Force Base. He was a damage photographer. Caplin settled in Albuquerque in 1945. He died on November 14, 1984, in Albuquerque.

== Career ==
In 1940, Caplin worked at the Rochester Lithographic Company. Caplin began taking pictures of the Southwestern United States, particularly in New Mexico, in the 1940s. His interests included landscapes of Utah, Arizona, New Mexico, and Colorado. In 1944, he was hired by the New Mexico Tourist Bureau to capture color images of scenic and historical significance for promotional and tourist materials. The Saturday Evening Post hired him to capture a series of landscape photos. The "River of Aspens" came out of that effort. A United States commemorative postage stamp depicts Caplin's photograph of Shiprock to memorialize the 50th year of New Mexico's statehood. He taught photography.

Many of his images were taken at Bell Ranch, sometimes on horseback and alongside working cowboys. He photographed Puebloan people — like Maria Martinez, a notable potter from San Ildefonso Pueblo — and Navajo and Zuni Native Americans. He was hired by the Bureau of Indian Affairs to preserve information about their ways of life, such as their ceremonial practices.

Caplin had a studio in Old Town Albuquerque. His works have been published in Life, Time, New Mexico Magazine, Field & Stream, and other magazines. Caplin was a founding member of a professional photographers' organization in 1948. He cataloged 55,000 photographs that he made up to the year of his death.

== Publication ==
- Caplin, Harvey (1973). Enchanted Land, New Mexico. Bank Securities, Incorporated. ISBN 978-0-910750-28-8.
- Fitzpatrick, George; Caplin, Harvey (1976), Albuquerque: 100 years in pictures, 1875-1975 (2nd ed.), Albuquerque, N.M: Modern Press, ISBN 091075036X

Posthumous books

- Caplin, Harvey; Caplin, Abbie (2010). Harvey Caplin's Real Cowboys & the Old West. Schiffer Pub. ISBN 978-0-7643-3434-4.
- Johns, Douglas C. (2019). Harvey Caplin's Photographic Archive of the Southwest: An Archive of 50,000 Graphic Documents Illustrating the Dynamic Growth and Transformation of a Region in the Four Decades Following World War II. Douglas Johns.
