= William N. Lane II =

- Born: William Noble Lane; July 21, 1917; Wisconsin
- Died: September 18, 1978 (aged 61); Bell Ranch, New Mexico
- Occupations: Binding company, bank, and ranch owner
- Known for: More than doubled the size of Bell Ranch when he owned it

William Noble Lane II (July 21, 1917–September 18, 1978) was an American president and chairman of Lane Industries, which owned General Binding Corporation, a farm in Virginia, and Bell Ranch. Lane was the chief executive officer and chairman of the Board of General Binding Corporation, a firm that makes business equipment. Bell Ranch is a large cattle ranch in eastern New Mexico. He was the director of four banks, Northwest National Bank of Chicago, Lakeview Trust and Savings Bank, Pioneer Bank and Trust Company, and Northbrook Trust and Savings Bank that he purchased between 1970 and 1976.

Lane was a member of the Class of 1939 at Princeton University. During World War II, he was a pilot and flight instructor for the United States Navy.

William Noble Lane, the son of Elizabeth Schwaab Lane and William Noble Lane Sr., was born in Milwaukee, Wisconsin on July 21, 1917. Lane married Ann (née Phelps) Young in June 1949 in Lake Forest, Illinois. Ann was the stepmother of William N. Lane III. The couple had five children, Carolyn, Barbara, Jeffrey, Nelson, and Andrew. Lane lived in Lake Forest, Illinois and at his 292,000-acre cattle ranch Bell Ranch. He died at his ranch after running off the road and crashing his car on September 18, 1978. Lane's wife lived at the ranch at the time of his death. Ann died in Charlottesville, Virginia on October 23, 1991. Lane and his wife Ann were buried at Bell Ranch in Tucumcari, New Mexico.

Following his father's death, William N. Lane III became the vice chairman at General Binding Corporation. Brothers Andrew and Jeffrey and Jeffrey's wife Janet lived and worked at the Bell Ranch at the time of their father's and father-in-law's death.
