= ACCO Brands =

American branded consumer and business products company

ACCO Brands Corporation
- Type: Public
- Traded as: NYSE: ACCO
- Industry: Branded consumer and business products
- Founded: 1903; 123 years ago (as American Clip Company); 2005; 21 years ago (current corporation)
- Founder: Fred J. Kline
- Headquarters: Lake Zurich, Illinois, U.S.
- Area served: Worldwide
- Key people: Thomas W. Tedford (president and CEO)
- Products: Office supplies, planners, shredders, binding and laminating products, computer accessories, gaming accessories
- Revenue: US$1.525 billion (2025)
- Net income: US$41.3 million (2025)
- Number of employees: nearly 6,600 (2026)
- Subsidiaries: Esselte, Kensington, Leitz, Mead, PowerA, Swingline, Tilibra
- Website: www.accobrands.com

ACCO Brands Corporation is an American producer of branded consumer, academic, business, and technology products. The company is headquartered in Lake Zurich, Illinois, and sells its products in more than 100 countries.

The present company was formed in 2005 through the spin-off of ACCO World from Fortune Brands and its merger with General Binding Corporation.

== History ==
The ACCO name derives from the American Clip Company, founded in 1903 by Fred J. Kline. The business later became part of American Brands, later known as Fortune Brands.

In 2005, Fortune Brands spun off ACCO World and merged it with General Binding Corporation to create ACCO Brands Corporation.

In 2012, ACCO Brands merged with MeadWestvaco's Consumer & Office Products business. The transaction added brands including Mead, Five Star, Trapper Keeper, AT-A-GLANCE, Cambridge, Day Runner, Hilroy, Tilibra, and Grafons to the company's portfolio.

In 2017, ACCO Brands acquired Esselte Group Holdings AB, expanding its position in Europe and adding brands including Leitz, Esselte, Rapid, and Rexel.

In 2020, ACCO Brands acquired PowerA, a maker of video game controllers and gaming accessories, as part of its expansion in technology accessories.

In 2023, Thomas W. Tedford succeeded Boris Elisman as chief executive officer.

== Operations ==
ACCO Brands sells products for work, learning, and gaming, including office supplies, planning and organization products, shredders, binding and laminating equipment, computer accessories, and gaming peripherals.

The company operates through Americas and International segments. As of 2026, it said it had nearly 6,600 employees in 21 countries, with products sold in more than 100 countries.

== Brands ==
Its principal brands include AT-A-GLANCE, Five Star, Kensington, Leitz, Mead, Quartet, Rapid, Rexel, Swingline, Tilibra, Wilson Jones, and PowerA.

== See also ==
- Derwent Cumberland Pencil Company
- General Binding Corporation
- Swingline
