= New Mexico Magazine =

State magazine of New Mexico, launched in 1923, the first US state magazine

- Categories: Regional magazine
- Frequency: Monthly
- Founded: 1923
- Company: New Mexico Tourism Department
- Country: United States
- Based in: Santa Fe, New Mexico
- Language: English
- Website: www.nmmagazine.com
- ISSN: 0028-6249

New Mexico Magazine was launched in 1923, and is the first state magazine founded in the United States. It is published monthly in print, online, and via an iOS app. Additionally, the magazine also maintains a store, selling New Mexico-related products.

== Overview ==
Based in Santa Fe, the magazine got its start as New Mexico Highway Journal, the official New Mexico Highway Department newsletter, but its mission expanded in the 1930s, when it began to run more feature stories of interest to New Mexico tourists. Today, reaching over 100,000 readers a month, the magazine covers a broad range of topics, including New Mexico's history, archaeology, culture, people, natural wonders, and tourist attractions.

Most of New Mexico's best-known authors, journalists, and photographers have contributed work to the magazine over the years. Tony Hillerman, Rudolfo Anaya, John Nichols, Ernie Pyle, John L. Sinclair and Erna Fergusson have all penned articles or essays. Edward Weston gave the magazine a collection of 33 original photographs in 1939, which the magazine subsequently donated to the Museum of New Mexico. Photographers whose works have since appeared in the magazine include Harvey Caplin, Paul Caponigro, Douglas Kent Hall, Miguel Gandert and Eliot Porter.

Since 1970, the magazine has had a standing feature, One of Our 50 Is Missing, which relates anecdotes about instances in which people elsewhere do not realize New Mexico is a state, confuse it with the nation of Mexico, or otherwise mistake it for a foreign country.

New Mexico Magazine is an enterprise fund of the New Mexico Tourism Department, and functions without taxpayer funding.
