= George F. Ellis =

George Forbes Ellis was a cattleman, pioneer in the field of beef cattle production, and a published writer. Born in Portales, New Mexico Territory on May 11, 1903, he graduated from the Kansas State Agricultural College (now Kansas State University) in Manhattan, Kansas in animal husbandry.

== Ranching ==
George Forbes Ellis managed the Bell Ranch 1947–1970. He had worked for 20 years in the ranching field and in agricultural extension work before joining the Bell organization as an assistant manager to Albert K. Mitchell in 1944.

In 1947, under the ownership of the Keeney family of Lubbock, Texas, Ellis did pioneering work in the field of production testing in commercial cattle operations. In 1948 he inaugurated the ranch's testing program working with John H. Knox and others at the New Mexico State University Animal Husbandry Department. He was interested in increasing the weight-gaining potential of the annual calf crops and improving the type, quality and conformation of the ranch's output. He adopted sound range and water conservation practices, extended and improved the network of ranch roads and maintenance of fences and corrals and earthen tanks, and developed the "Perra Corrals". For his work he was selected New Mexico "Cattleman of the Year" in 1952. Ellis was a member of the Cattle Sanitary Board of New Mexico and a Director of the New Mexico Cattle Growers Association and New Mexico Wool Growers Association. He wrote articles for various publications such as New Mexico Stockman and American Hereford Journal, and gave presentations at various meetings such as the Hereford Congress in August 1954 in Colorado Springs. He served on the Board of Regents for New Mexico State University of Agriculture, Engineering, and Science, 1956–1958.

Ellis's papers are held by the University of New Mexico.

== Writing ==
In May 1970, Ellis retired from the Bell coinciding with the change of ranch ownership from the Keeney family to William Lane of Connecticut. He lived only two more years but in that time penned the book, The Bell Ranch As I Knew It. This book went on to win the Wrangler Award for Western Heritage from the National Cowboy & Western Heritage Museum of Oklahoma City, Oklahoma in 1974 for best non-fiction book of the year.

== Awards ==
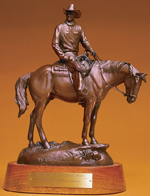
Bronze Wrangler

The Museum gives the Wrangler, an impressive original bronze sculpture by artist John Free. It's awarded annually during the Western Heritage Awards to principal creators of the winning entries in specified categories of Western literature, Western music, film and television.

In 1988, Ellis was honored along with his wife, Martha Downer Price (Mattie) Ellis by the Beef Improvement Federation with the Pioneer Award for their lifelong contributions to the industry. The impact of his work is further documented in the book, Courageous Cattlemen by Robert C De Baca, as one of 50 cattlemen and researchers who most influenced the performance movement in U.S. beef production.
