= General Binding Corporation =

Business machines and supplies manufacturer and service provider

General Binding Corporation (GBC) is a business machines and supplies manufacturer which makes equipment and supplies for binding, lamination, and other presentation products. The company is part of ACCO Brands and is headquartered in Lake Zurich, Illinois.

GBC was founded in 1947 by William N. Lane II and Edgar Uihlein when they purchased a small trade bindery in Chicago, Illinois. In 2005, Fortune Brands, Inc., spun off its ACCO World Corporation office products unit to be merged with General Binding Corporation (GBC); the merged company was named ACCO Brands Corporation. In 2009, Cosmo Films acquired GBC Commercial Print Finishing, the thermal lamination division of ACCO Brands.
