= Bell Ranch =

Ranch in New Mexico, US

- Bell Ranch Headquarters
- U.S. National Register of Historic Places
- NM State Register of Cultural Properties
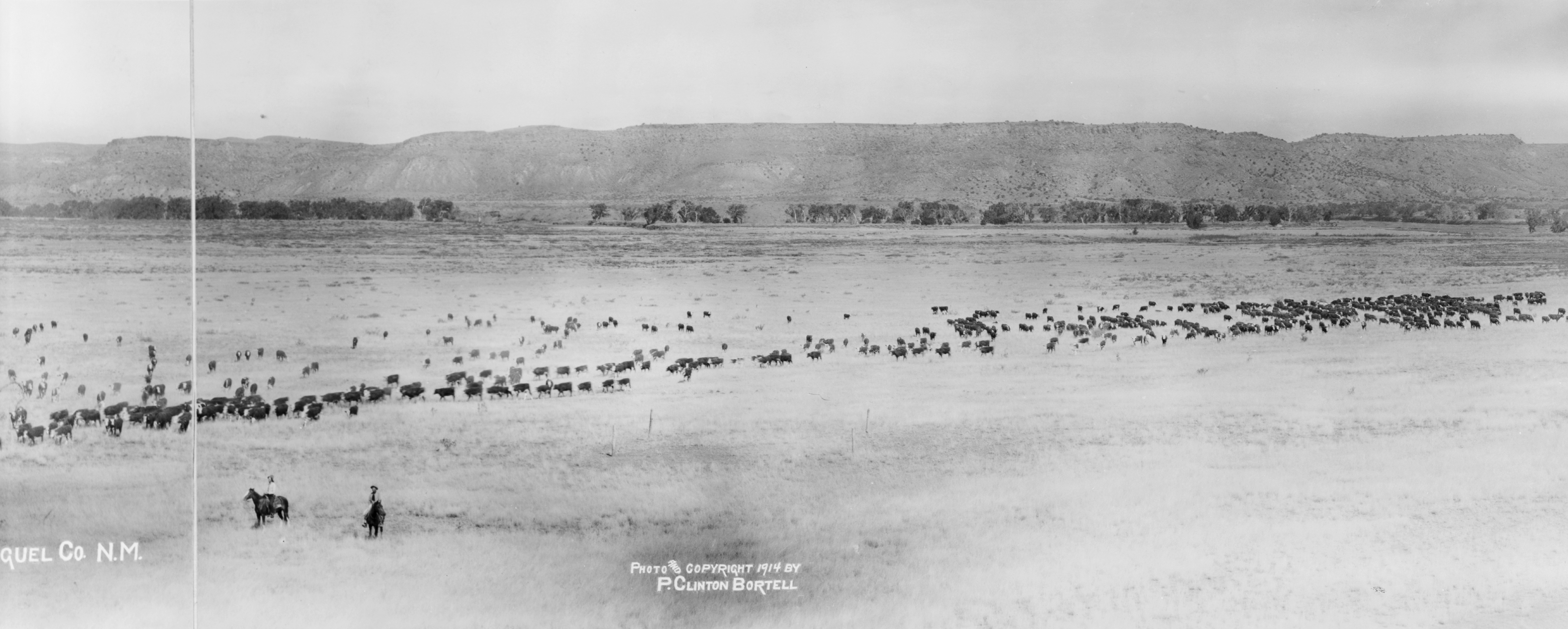
- Bell Ranch, San Miguel Co., N.M

- Location within New Mexico Location within the United States
- Nearest city: Tucumcari, New Mexico
- Coordinates: 35°31′46″N 104°6′0″W
- Area: 5 acres (2.0 ha)
- NRHP reference No.: 70000407
- NMSRCP No.: 133

Significant dates
- Added to NRHP: October 6, 1970
- Designated NMSRCP: November 21, 1969

The Bell Ranch is a historic ranch in San Miguel County, New Mexico, near Tucumcari. Owned by John Malone since 2010, it is one of the largest privately owned ranches in the United States. As of 2021, Malone is the second largest land owner in the country with 2.2 million acres. The ranch became a national landmark in 1974.

== Location ==
Lying along La Cinta Creek near the Canadian River, the ranch is bordered by Conchas Lake in San Miguel County, New Mexico about 30 miles (97 km) from Tucumcari, New Mexico.

== Description ==
The Bell Ranch stands at 290,100 acres (1,174 km^{2}), with six cow camps and a private airport known as the Waggoner Airport. Cattle mainly graze the grasslands of the ranch, with some supplemental feed.

Its features include Conchas Lake, Mule Canyon, and 13 miles (21 km) of land along the Canadian River. With 453 square miles, it is large enough to have its own zip code.

== History ==
Kiowa and Comanche ranged over the grassland that is now Bell Ranch. The ranch originated from a Mexican 655,468-acre land grant held by Pablo Montoya in 1824. At that time, the land was located within Santa Fe de Nuevo México of the First Mexican Republic (1824–1835). Montoya named the land Bell Ranch after Bell Mountain. Montoya did not have full ownership from the government until 1869. It also included the Baca Float No. 2. Montoya sold the land in 1874, after four vaqueros (cowboys) were killed by several Kiowa.

Wilson "Waddy" Waddingham became the largest landowner in northeastern New Mexico when he bought the Bell Ranch land to add to adjoining 754,000 acres he had acquired. A large white-washed adobe ranch house, the "White House", was built in 1876. It was a residence for his family and the place where he entertained notable government and business men, such as when he hosted a seven-course dinner on January 7, 1883 that was described as the "finest meal served in New Mexico Territory".

Waddingham bred his range cows with Shorthorn bulls and branded the cattle on their left hips with a bell-shaped brand. Vaqueros rode horses, acquired from Spain since the 16th century, to inspect the range and move cattle, using their roping skills. They trained horses for long-distance riding. Vaqueros created silver spurs, spade bits, and reatas, a type of rope. Vaqueros created center-fire rigged saddles that made it easier to move and maintain their balance while working the cattle. Their lifestyle melded with that of American cowboys. John H. Culley wrote the book Cattle, Horses and Men about what working on Bell Ranch was like.

In the 1930s, the ranch was acquired by Guy Waggoner, who built the 10,300-square-foot hacienda on the ranch. In 1947, the ranch was divided into six sections and land was sold. The ranch was acquired in 1970 by William N. Lane II of Chicago, chairman and CEO of publicly traded General Binding Corp., a maker of office supplies and equipment. Further purchases of the original grant land have fleshed out the holding to its present size of 290,100 acres (1,174 km^{2}). In 1970, it acquired its own zip code, 88441. After Lane died in a 1978 car accident on the ranch, it was owned by his five children through a trust. His son Jeff died in a plane accident on the ranch in 2007. In 2010, the ranch, which was listed for $83 million, was acquired by Silver Spur Ranches, a ranching company owned by John Malone.

== Popular culture ==
- Canadian artist Robert Lougheed visited the ranch numerous times taking inspiration from the horses, people and places to create a body of work recognized by the National Cowboy & Western Heritage Museum.
- In the 1940s, famed photographer Harvey Caplin took images in black and white. Some of these have been used by the Stetson Hat Company for promotion since that time as the quintessential western iconography.

== See also ==
- National Register of Historic Places listings in San Miguel County, New Mexico
- Baca family of New Mexico
- Jack Chatfield
- John Chisum
- Linda Mitchell Davis
- George F. Ellis
- Tom Ketchum
- Robert Lougheed
- T4 Cattle Company, adjoining cattle ranch
