= Borrowdale graphite =

Borrowdale graphite is a natural graphite deposit in Borrowdale, Cumbria, England, near Seathwaite. It is historically associated with the early development of the pencil industry because the deposit produced unusually pure, solid graphite that could be cut into pieces for use in early writing implements.

The Seathwaite workings are the best known of the Borrowdale graphite mines. Historic England lists the Borrowdale graphite mines and associated remains, including guardhouses, a sawpit and a grinding mill, as a scheduled monument.

== History ==
According to later accounts, the deposit became known in the 16th century, and the first documentary evidence for graphite working at Seathwaite dates from 1540. The material was valued not only for writing and drawing but also for industrial uses, including moulds for metal casting and the casting of cannonballs.

Because of its purity and value, Borrowdale graphite was worked under close control, and the site later acquired guardhouses and other security features.

== Pencil industry ==
The Borrowdale deposit played an important role in the history of the pencil. Encyclopaedia Britannica notes that the development of the modern pencil became possible after the discovery of an unusually pure graphite deposit in Borrowdale in 1564, and that the graphite was cut into sticks and used in early holders. The availability of Borrowdale graphite also gave rise to the pencil making industry at Keswick.
