= T4 Cattle Company =

Cattle ranch in New Mexico

Coordinates: 35°6′53″N 104°3′48″W

T4 Cattle Company is a cattle ranch near Montoya, New Mexico, in eastern New Mexico, operated by family since it was founded in 1902 by Yetta Kohn. As of 2023, it is operated by Phil Bidegain. It is a cow-calf ranch with about 2,500 mother cows, where the cows feed on gramma grasses. At 180,000 acres the ranch is among the largest in the country, and making the Bidegains among the largest landowners in the country. The ranch breeds Quarter Horses and its farm grows wheat hay and alfalfa.

== History ==
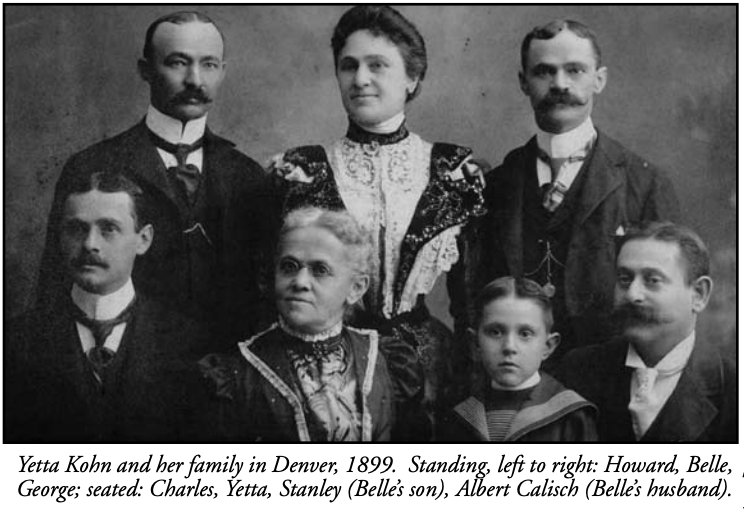
Yetta Kohn and her family, taken in Denver, 1899

Yetta Kohn established the Kohn ranch and a mercantile store in Montoya in 1902. Yetta had four children, two of whom died in 1916 and Yetta died the following year. Howard Kohn operated the ranch and mercantile after their deaths. He purchased land from other ranchers and farmers who could not sustain their farms and ranches after years of drought. He married Clara McGown, his bookkeeper, and had a daughter, Yetta.

By 1915, the ranch had acquired the T4 brand for its Hereford cattle. Howard bred horses for the ranch and their descendants work on the ranch now. In the 1930s, drought was so severe that the government bought rancher's cattle, the starving animals were driven through creek beds, like a Game drive system, and shot and killed. A prairie fire on the ranch in 1993 scorched the ground. Howard died the following day of smoke inhalation and as a result of the fire. During the drought and Great Depression, Clara took over management of the family businesses. She leased pasture land in Mexico and sent the cattle on the ranch there to graze. By 1947, Clara bought 117,000 acres from neighboring Bell Ranch, bringing the ranch's size to 180,000 contiguous acres.

Soon after, her daughter Yetta returned from the University of Arizona. She married a fellow student, Phillip Bidegain, who also grew up on a ranch. Within a few years, they began running the ranch.

== Cattle, horse, and farm operations ==
Phil and Yetta Bidegain manage the T4 Cattle Company ranch. They implemented methods to conserve the land by controlling undesirable plants and setting control burns. They introduced Black Angus bulls to the Hereford herd.

Their son, Phillip, who majored in range management at the University of Arizona, is the general manager on the ranch with his wife Laurie, who manages the horse program that breeds Quarter Horses. The ranch is an AQHA Ranching Heritage Breeder. Laurie states that the horses "...were carefully bred to traverse hard terrain, pack cowboys, maintain good conformation and, most importantly, have good cow sense."

Phillip and Laurie's son Donnie and his wife Lacey grow wheat hay and alfalfa. The Bidegain's second son, Scott, and his wife Brooke help manage the cattle.
