= Derwent Pencil Museum =

Museum in Keswick, Cumbria, England

The Derwent Pencil Museum
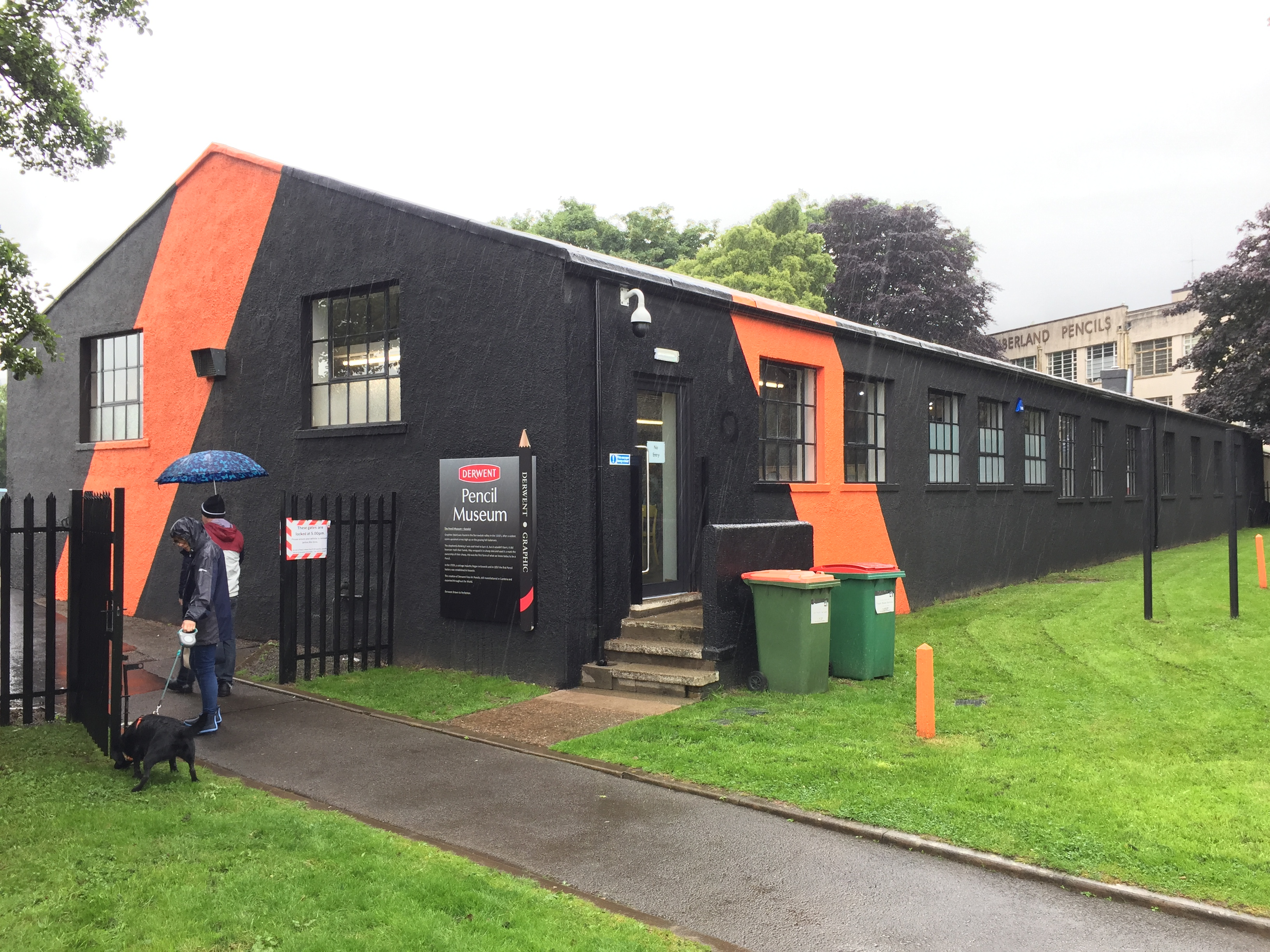
- Main entrance to the museum in 2017
- Established: 1981; 45 years ago
- Location: Southey Works, Keswick, CA12 5NG
- Coordinates: 54.6040°N 3.1419°W
- Visitors: 80,000
- Website: derwentart.com/pencilmuseum

The Derwent Pencil Museum is a museum dedicated to the manufacturing and history of pencils, located in Keswick, in the north-west of England.

== History ==
The first pencil factory, owned by the Cumberland Pencil Company, opened in Keswick in 1832. The second and current factory was started in the 1920s and completed in 1950 and closed in 2007 when production was moved to Workington.

The museum opened in 1981 and is home to one of the biggest colouring pencils in the world, the idea of technical manager Barbara Murray. The yellow pencil was completed on 28 May 2001, is 7.91 metres (25 ft 11 1/2 in) long, and weighs 446.36 kilograms (984 lb 7/8 oz). In addition, the museum features a replica of a Seathwaite graphite mine.

The museum featured in a 1997 episode of the BBC educational children's television series Come Outside.

The museum now receives over 80,000 visitors a year from all around the world. It is particularly popular with visitors from the county of Yorkshire, due to the importance of pencil production for the local economy during the 1930s. The museum features as one of the locations in the 2012 film Sightseers.

== Storm Desmond ==
In December 2015, the museum was badly damaged by several feet of flood water when the River Greta broke its banks as a result of Storm Desmond and many artefacts were destroyed. Although many of the exhibits were salvaged, one limited-edition collection could not be replaced.

The museum reopened to the public on 15 June 2017, with Countryfile presenter John Craven cutting the ribbon.

== Gallery ==
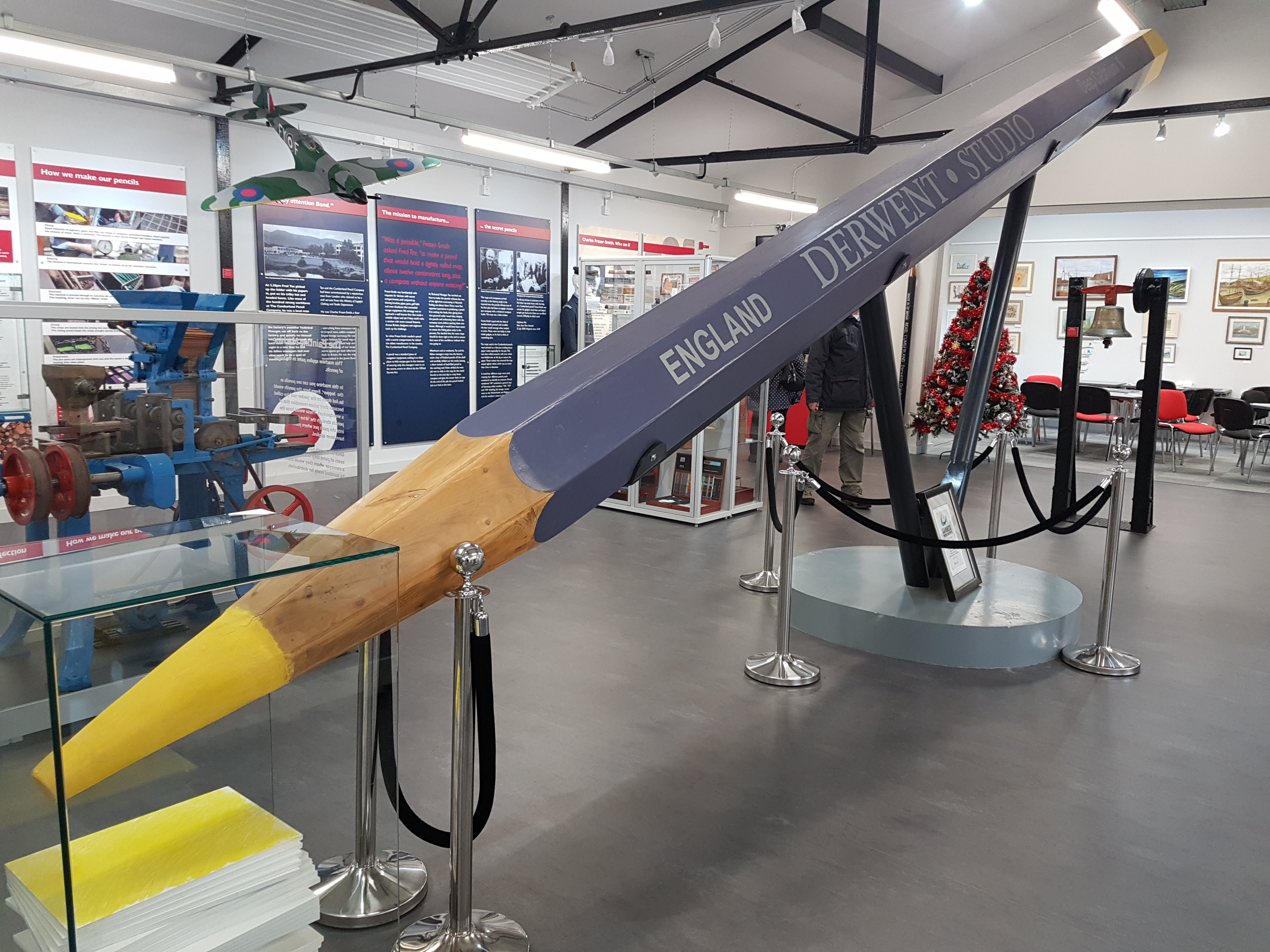
The tip of the world's largest pencil

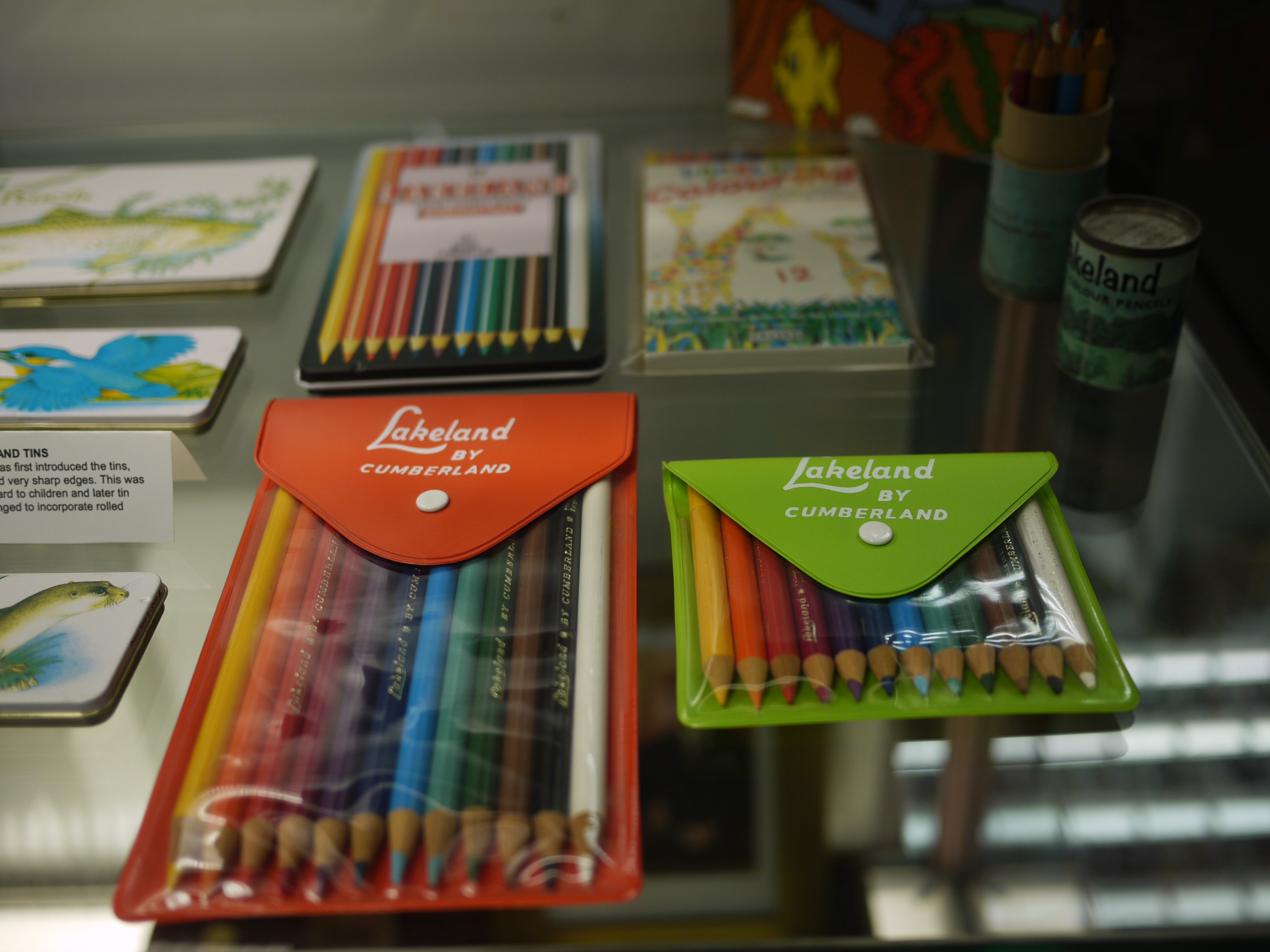
Lakeland pencils at the Pencil Museum

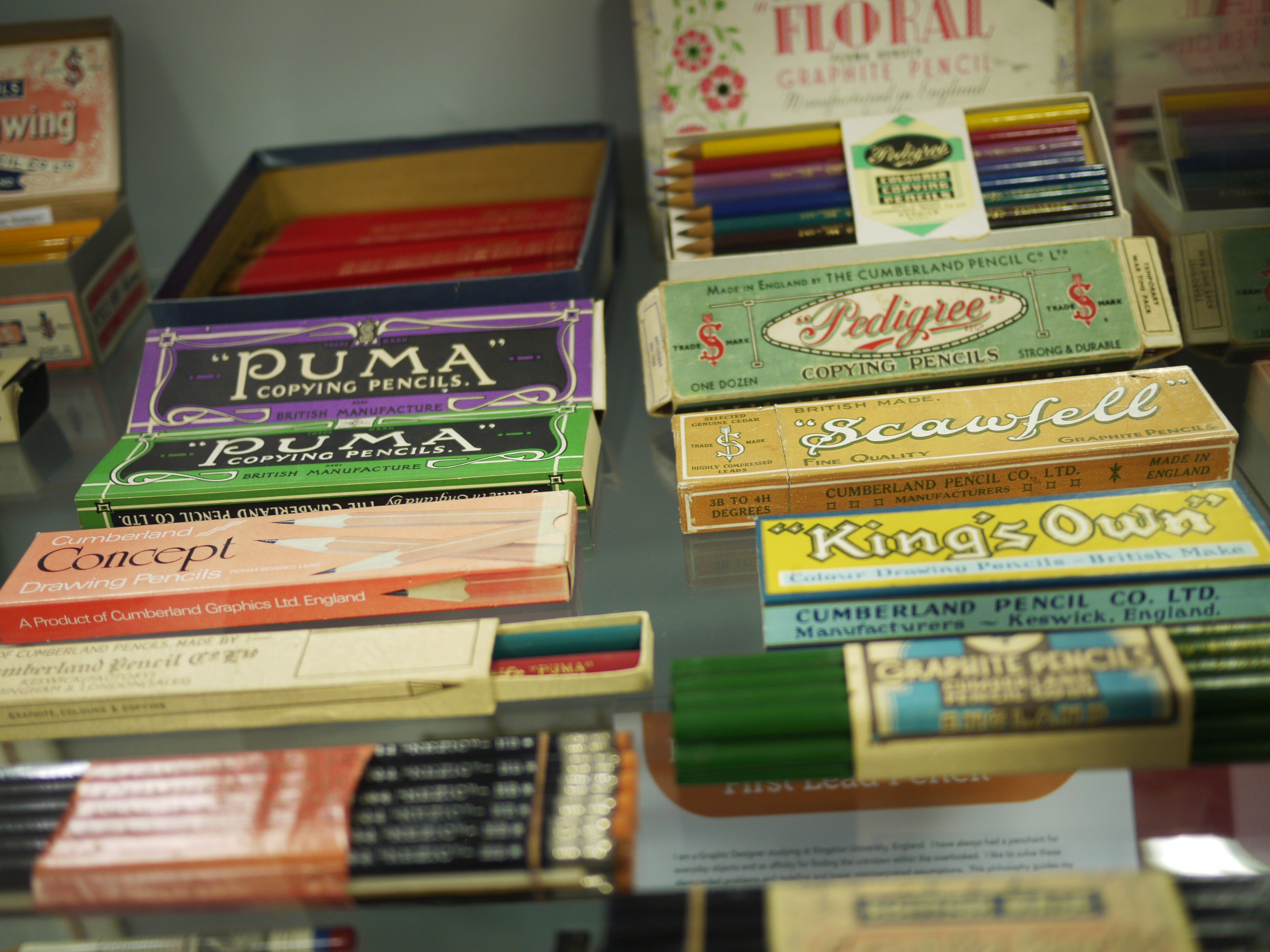
Pencil boxes

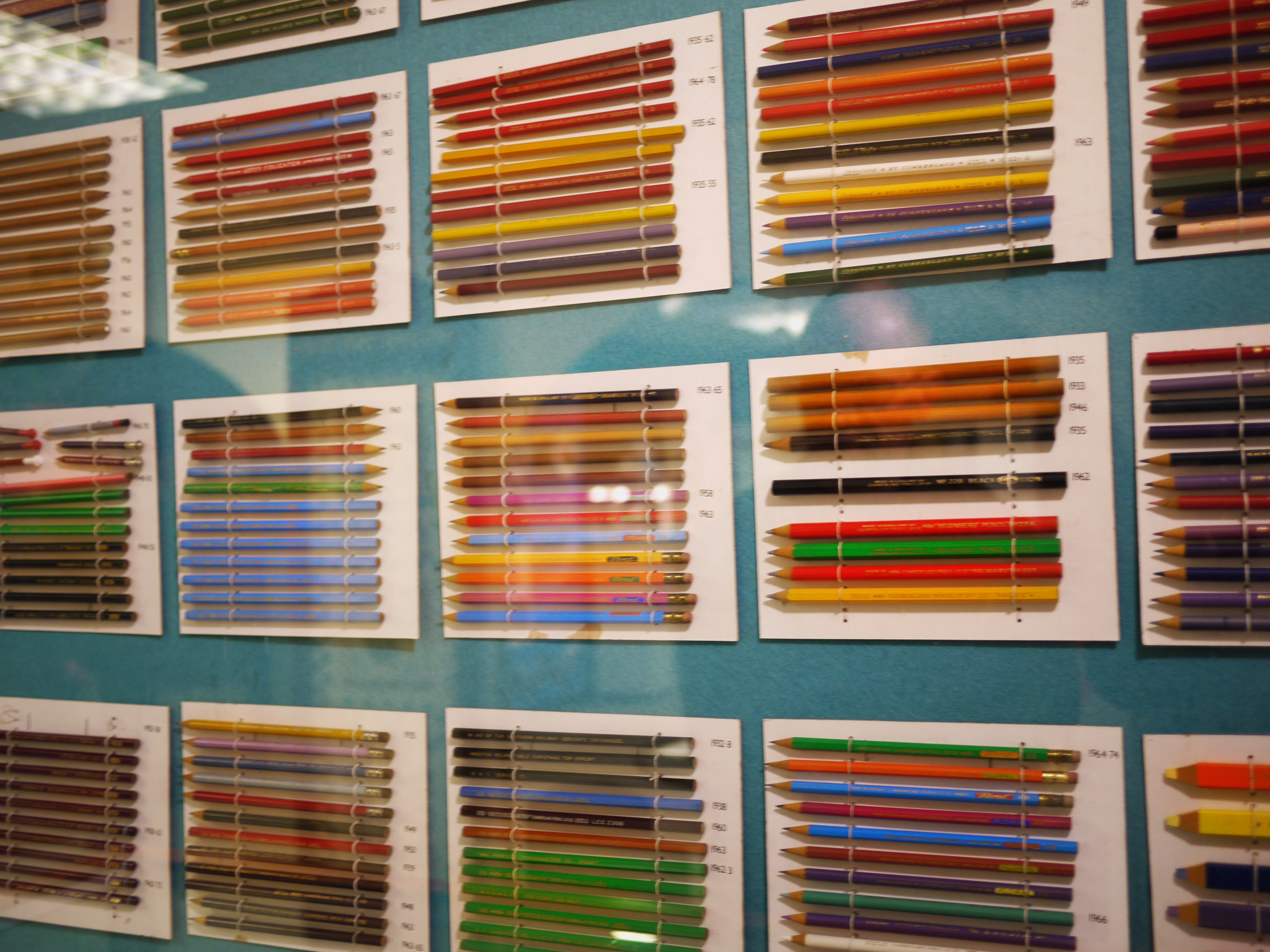
Coloured pencils

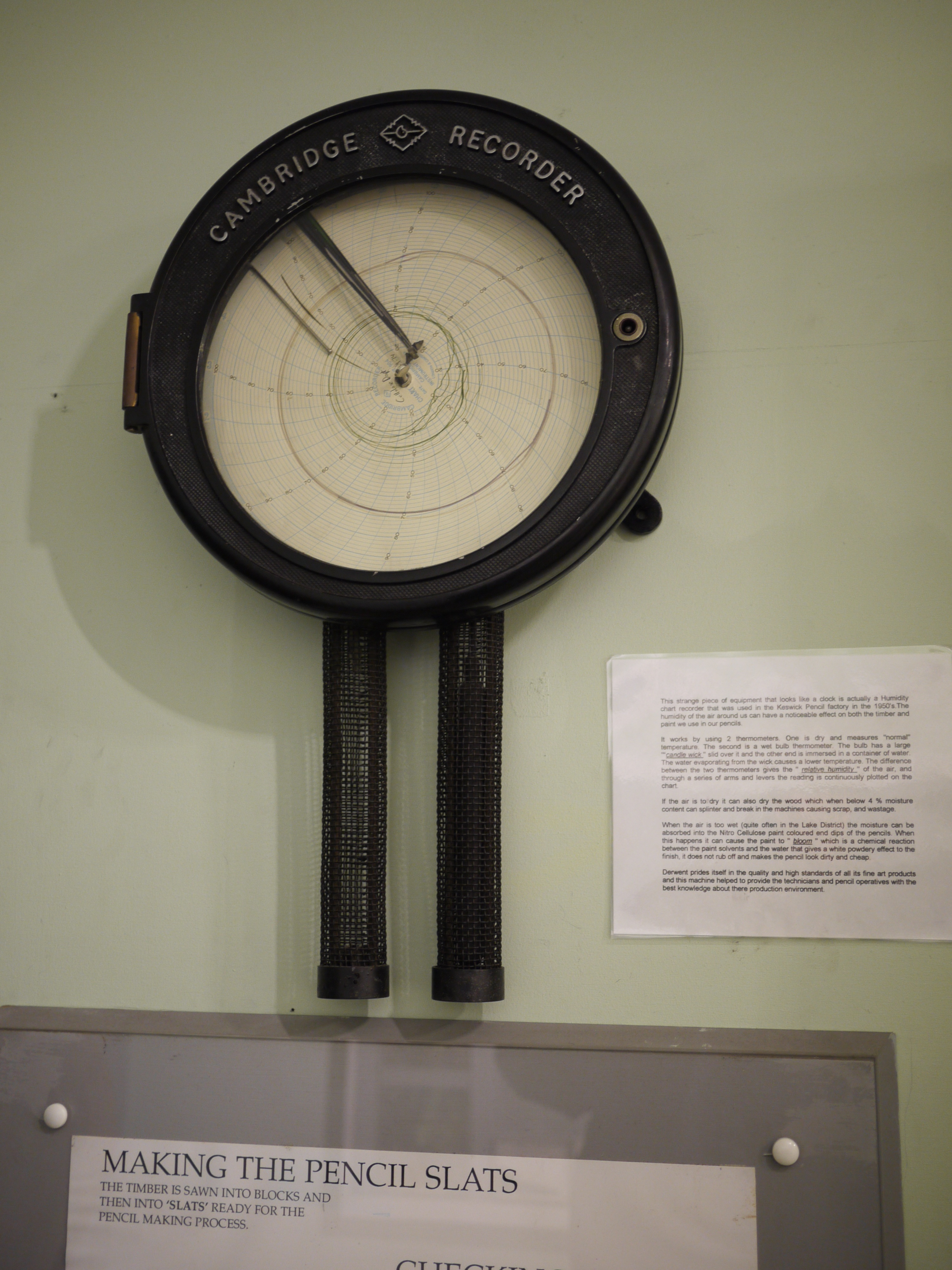
Pencil humidity recorder

== See also ==
- Derwent Cumberland Pencil Company
- Sightseers
