= John C. Malone =

American businessman, landowner, and philanthropist (born 1943)

John Malone
- Born: John Carl Malone; March 7, 1941 (age 85); Milford, Connecticut, U.S.
- Education: Yale University (BA); New York University (MS); Johns Hopkins University (MS, PhD)
- Occupation: Businessman
- Title: Chairman of Liberty Media, Liberty Global, and QVC Group
- Spouse: Leslie Malone
- Children: 2

John Carl Malone (born March 7, 1941) is an American billionaire businessman, landowner, and philanthropist. He was chief executive officer (CEO) of Tele-Communications Inc. (TCI), a cable and media giant, from 1973 to 1996. As of 2016, Malone is now chairman and largest voting shareholder of Liberty Media, Liberty Global, Warner Bros. Discovery and QVC Group (formerly known as Liberty Interactive). He once owned 7% of Lionsgate and Starz Inc.

He was interim CEO of Liberty Media until succeeded by former Microsoft and Oracle CFO Greg Maffei in 2005.

From 2011 to 2021, Malone ranked as the largest private landowner in the United States with 2.2 million acres (8,900 km^{2}), according to The Land Report. In 2021, his landholdings were exceeded by Sierra Pacific Industries’ Red Emmerson, according to the Land Report 100.

== Early life ==
John C. Malone was born on March 7, 1941, in Milford, Connecticut. His father was Daniel L. Malone, an engineer. Malone is of Irish heritage, his family originating in County Cork. Malone is a Catholic.

In 1959, Malone graduated from Hopkins School in New Haven, Connecticut. In 1963, he graduated from Yale University with a bachelor's degree in electrical engineering and economics, where he was a Phi Beta Kappa and National Merit scholar. In 1964, Malone graduated from Johns Hopkins University with a master's degree in industrial management. He received a master's in electrical engineering at an NYU program at Bell Labs in 1965 before receiving his PhD in operations research at Johns Hopkins in 1967.

== Business career ==
In 1963, Malone began his career at Bell Telephone Laboratories of AT&T, working in economic planning and research and development. In 1968, he joined McKinsey & Company, and in 1970, became group vice president at General Instrument Corporation (GI). He was later president of Jerrold Electronics, a GI subsidiary. For twenty-four years, from 1973 to 1996, Malone was president and CEO of Tele-Communications Inc. (TCI). Malone is chairman emeritus of Cable Television Laboratories, Inc. and chairman of Liberty Global, Inc., and formerly the DirecTV Group. His rise to chairman at Liberty Global was contentious at times.

In 2005, Malone held 32 percent of the shares in the media company News Corporation, and although only about half were voting shares, Rupert Murdoch reportedly had concerns that he might lose control of his company to Malone, and tried to oust him from the firm with a "poison pill" strategy.

Malone was the director of the National Cable & Telecommunications Association (NCTA) from 1974 to 1977, and again from 1980 to 1993. During the 1977–1978 term, Malone was the NCTA's treasurer.

In 1992, Malone coined the term 500-channel universe to describe a future media environment in which a vast number of TV channels would be available, by eliminating the need for broadcast radio channels as a scarce resource.

In business dealings Malone has been dubbed "Darth Vader", a nickname allegedly given to him by Al Gore when Malone was the head of TCI.

In 1994, Wired portrayed Malone on their cover as "Mad Max" from The Road Warrior (also known as Mad Max 2), with an interview describing his battles with the FCC.

Malone is known throughout the business world as the "Cable Cowboy".

Bloomberg estimated him to be worth over US$9 billion in May 2021.

== Land ownership ==
Malone owns Silver Spur Ranches, a ranching and beef company, which includes the Silver Spur Ranch in Encampment, Wyoming, Bell Ranch and the TO Ranch in New Mexico, Bridlewood Farm, a thoroughbred breeding, training and racing operation in Ocala, Florida; as well as ranches in Walden, Colorado, and Kiowa, Colorado. His foreign real estate holdings include Humewood Castle and Castlemartin House and Estate, both in Ireland.

As of 1 February 2011, he surpassed Ted Turner as the largest individual private landowner in the US, owning 2,200,000 acres (8,900 km^{2}) of land, much of it in Maine, Colorado, New Mexico, and Wyoming. He owns more than 5% of the state of Maine. Malone held the top spot as America's largest landowner for 10 years, according to the 2022 The Land Report's ranking of the top 100 U.S. landowners. In 2021, the ranking listed Malone as the second largest landowner behind the Emmerson Family.

== Philanthropy ==
In 2000, Malone gave $24 million to the Yale School of Engineering & Applied Science in New Haven for the construction of Yale's Daniel L. Malone Engineering Center, named in honor of his father.

In 2011, Malone gave the Johns Hopkins Whiting School of Engineering in Baltimore its largest gift ever of $30 million for a new building on Homewood Campus. The building is named Malone Hall.

In the same year, he gave the Yale School of Engineering & Applied Science's largest gift ever of $50 million.

Malone has also given $60 million to Hopkins School in New Haven to fund the construction of two new buildings, Malone Science Center, named for his father, as well as Heath Commons, named after his favorite Hopkins teacher. Additionally, he is fully funding the Gibbs Center for Innovation, named in honor of Josiah Willard Gibbs.

In 2014, Malone and his wife donated $42.5 million to Colorado State University to help create the Institute for Biologic Translational Therapies to develop stem cell and other treatments for both animals and humans. Of the donation, $32.5 million will pay for half the construction costs and $10 million will go to operational expenses.

In 2021, the Malones donated $25 million to Maine Medical Center in Portland, Maine, for the hospital's $534 million capital improvement project. The project included a new tower for cardiac and vascular services named the Malone Family Tower; Leslie Malone would later receive cardiac care at the hospital.

== Malone Scholars Program ==
In 1997, he established the Malone Family Foundation, which operates the Malone Scholars Program that provides scholarship endowments to certain private schools throughout the United States.

== Personal life ==
Malone and his wife, Leslie, live in Elizabeth, Colorado. They have two children. His wife is active in dressage and horse breeding, and founded Harmony Sporthorses in Kiowa, Colorado. In 2008, their son, Evan D. Malone, joined the board of Liberty Media. John Malone is known to shun the limelight and glamorous lifestyle, taking his family vacations alongside long-time friend Gary Biskup in a recreational vehicle. The State of Colorado named Malone a "Citizen of the West" in 2016.

Malone's political beliefs have been described as libertarian. He is on the board of directors for the Cato Institute. He donated US$250,000 to Donald Trump. Since March 2023, Malone has donated $347,600 to the National Republican Congressional Committee. He also expressed support for Michael Bloomberg in the 2020 United States presidential election.
