= La Cinta Creek =

Stream in San Miguel County, New Mexico, U.S.

Coordinates: 35°24′17″N 104°06′32″W

La Cinta Creek is a stream in San Miguel County, New Mexico, that flows into the Canadian River and the Upper Canadian-Ute Reservoir Watershed. Its tributaries are Canon Bestias, Mule Creek, Seco Creek, Puertocito Creek, and Tullas Creek.
