= Metropolitan Park =

Metropolitan Park may refer to:

- Metropolitan Park (Florida), a waterfront park in Jacksonville, Florida, United States
- Metropolitan Park (Manhattan), a former baseball ground in Manhattan, New York City, United States
- Metropolitan Park (Queens), a planned park, casino and entertainment complex in Queens, New York City, United States
- Metropolitan Park of Havana, an urban natural area located in Havana, Cuba
- Metropolitan Park Bathhouse and Pool Historic District in Tucumcari, New Mexico, United States
- Metropolitan Park System of Greater Boston, a series of parks in Massachusetts, United States
- Metropolitan Natural Park, a park in Panama City, Panama
- Hellenikon Metropolitan Park, an unfinished development project in Athens, Greece
- Kaohsiung Metropolitan Park, a park in Kaohsiung, Taiwan
  - Metropolitan Park metro station, a metro station adjacent to Kaohsiung Metropolitan Park
- Santiago Metropolitan Park, an urban park in Santiago, Chile
