= Tucumcari (disambiguation) =

Tucumcari is a city in and the county seat of Quay County, New Mexico, United States.

Tucumcari may also refer to:

- Tucumcari Mountain, a mesa near the city of Tucumcari, New Mexico
- USS Tucumcari (PGH-2), a U.S. Navy hydrofoil
- "Tucumcari", a song by Jimmie Rodgers from 1959
