= National Register of Historic Places listings in Quay County, New Mexico =

Location of Quay County in New Mexico

This is a list of the National Register of Historic Places listings in Quay County, New Mexico.

This is intended to be a complete list of the properties and districts on the National Register of Historic Places in Quay County, New Mexico, United States. Latitude and longitude coordinates are provided for many National Register properties and districts; these locations may be seen together in a map.

Thirteen properties and districts are listed on the National Register in the county. Another property was once listed, but has been removed. All of the places within the county on the National Register are also listed on the State Register of Cultural Properties with the single exception of the Arch Hurley Conservancy District Office Building.

This National Park Service list is complete through NPS recent listings posted February 27, 2026.

Contents: NRHP in New Mexico by county
Bernalillo – Catron – Chaves – Cibola – Colfax – Curry – De Baca – Doña Ana – Eddy – Grant – Guadalupe – Harding – Hidalgo – Lea – Lincoln – Los Alamos – Luna – McKinley – Mora – Otero – Quay – Rio Arriba – Roosevelt – San Juan – San Miguel – Sandoval – Santa Fe – Sierra – Socorro – Taos – Torrance – Union – Valencia

== Current listings ==
	Name on the Register	Image	Date listed	Location	City or town	Description
1	Blue Swallow Motel	Blue Swallow Motel	November 22, 1993 (#93001210)	815 E. Tucumcari Boulevard; 35°10′19″N 103°42′58″W	Tucumcari	
2	Cactus Motor Lodge	Cactus Motor Lodge	March 21, 2006 (#06000154)	1316 E. Tucumcari Boulevard; 35°10′16″N 103°42′38″W	Tucumcari	Now Cactus RV Park.
3	Glenrio Historic District	Glenrio Historic District	January 17, 2007 (#06001258)	State Road 1578; 35°10′43″N 103°02′33″W	Glenrio	Extends into Deaf Smith County, Texas
4	Arch Hurley Conservancy District Office Building	Arch Hurley Conservancy District Office Building	December 16, 1994 (#94001403)	101 E. High St. 35°10′34″N 103°43′32″W	Tucumcari	
5	Arch and Ola Hurley House		January 3, 2025 (#100011238)	117 West High Street. 35°10′34″N 103°43′37″W	Tucumcari	
6	Metropolitan Park Bathhouse and Pool Historic District	Metropolitan Park Bathhouse and Pool Historic District	March 15, 1996 (#96000268)	South frontage road of Interstate 40, 1.5 miles west of the western exit for Tucumcari; 35°08′43″N 103°48′01″W	Tucumcari	
7	Nara Visa School	Nara Visa School	October 31, 1983 (#83004151)	U.S. Route 54; 35°36′51″N 103°05′53″W	Nara Visa	
8	Odeon Theater	Odeon Theater	January 17, 2007 (#06001254)	123 S. 2nd St. 35°10′48″N 103°43′37″W	Tucumcari	
9	Richardson Store	Richardson Store	November 16, 1978 (#78001819)	Off Interstate 40; 35°05′43″N 104°03′55″W	Montoya	
10	Route 66, Locally Maintained from Glenrio to San Jon	Route 66, Locally Maintained from Glenrio to San Jon	March 24, 1994 (#93001207)	Texas border west to San Jon; 35°08′12″N 103°09′37″W	San Jon	
11	Route 66, State maintained from Montoya to Cuervo	Route 66, State maintained from Montoya to Cuervo	November 19, 1997 (#97001395)	Along former U.S. Route 66 from west of Montoya to Cuervo; 35°03′41″N 104°16′01″W	Cuervo	
12	Route 66, State maintained from Palomas to Montoya	Route 66, State maintained from Palomas to Montoya	March 24, 1994 (#93001208)	State frontage road from southeast of Palomas west to Montoya; 35°06′43″N 103°58′05″W	Montoya	
13	Route 66, State maintained from San Jon to Tucumcari	Route 66, State maintained from San Jon to Tucumcari	November 19, 1997 (#97001399)	Former U.S. Route 66 from east of San Jon to east of the Interstate 40 exit at Tucumcari; 35°08′46″N 103°27′09″W	San Jon	

== Former listing ==
	Name on the Register	Image	Date listed	Date removed	Location	City or town	Description
1	Baca-Goodman House	Baca-Goodman House	August 14, 1973 (#73002246)	July 18, 1977	Aber and 3rd Sts. 35°10′38″N 103°43′40″W	Tucumcari	Destroyed.

== See also ==
- List of National Historic Landmarks in New Mexico
- National Register of Historic Places listings in New Mexico
