= Carpenter Mesa =

Mesa in New Mexico, United States

Coordinates: 35°20′47″N 103°52′15″W

Carpenter Mesa is a mesa located at 352047N 1035215W in San Miguel County, New Mexico, northeast of Tucumcari.

The origin of the name is not certain, but might have originated from Henry Carpenter, who operated a large ranch in the Juan Tomás area of Bernalillo County, New Mexico, in the 1880s. In 1880 Frank Carpenter, born ca. 1856 in California, was enumerated in San Miguel County as a "cattle raiser", with wife Victoria. A topographic map shows Carpenter Mesa along the north bank of the Canadian River where it flows parallel to Highway 104.
