= Arch Hurley Conservancy District Office Building =

- U.S. National Register of Historic Places
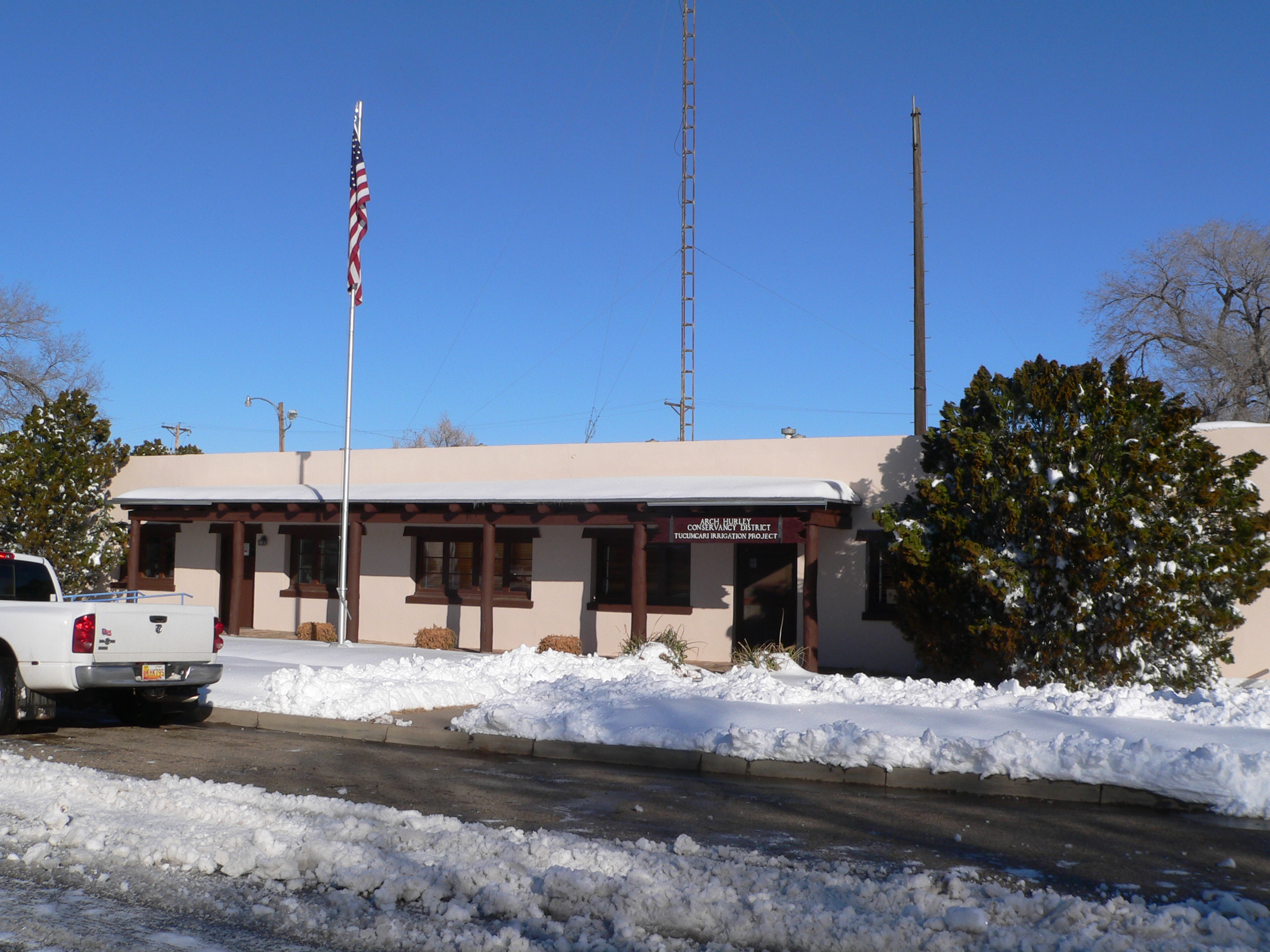
- Hurley Office Building in 2010

- Location within New Mexico Location within the United States
- Location: 101 E. High St., Tucumcari, New Mexico
- Coordinates: 35°10′34″N 103°43′32″W
- Area: 0.2 acres (0.081 ha)
- Architect: Bureau of Reclamation
- Architectural style: Pueblo
- NRHP reference No.: 94001403
- Added to NRHP: December 16, 1994

The Arch Hurley Conservancy District Office Building is a historic building on E. High St. in Tucumcari, New Mexico. It has also been known as the Tucumcari Project Office Building. It was listed on the National Register of Historic Places in 1994.

The main part of the building is 100.5 by 37 feet (30.6 m × 11.3 m) and it has a 50.75 by 7 feet (15.47 m × 2.13 m) portal. It was designed by the Bureau of Reclamation in Spanish-Pueblo Revival architecture, albeit "in a fairly austere form reflecting the building's origins-a government structure from just before World War II." It is built on a poured concrete foundation with walls that are mostly concrete block, with poured concrete in sections where roof beams tie in. It has a simple parapet and a flat roof. It uses peeled logs as posts in the portal and in post-and-beam support for the roof in the main two rooms.

== See also ==
- National Register of Historic Places listings in Quay County, New Mexico
