= Almendares River =

River in western Cuba

Coordinates: 23°08′04″N 82°24′34″W

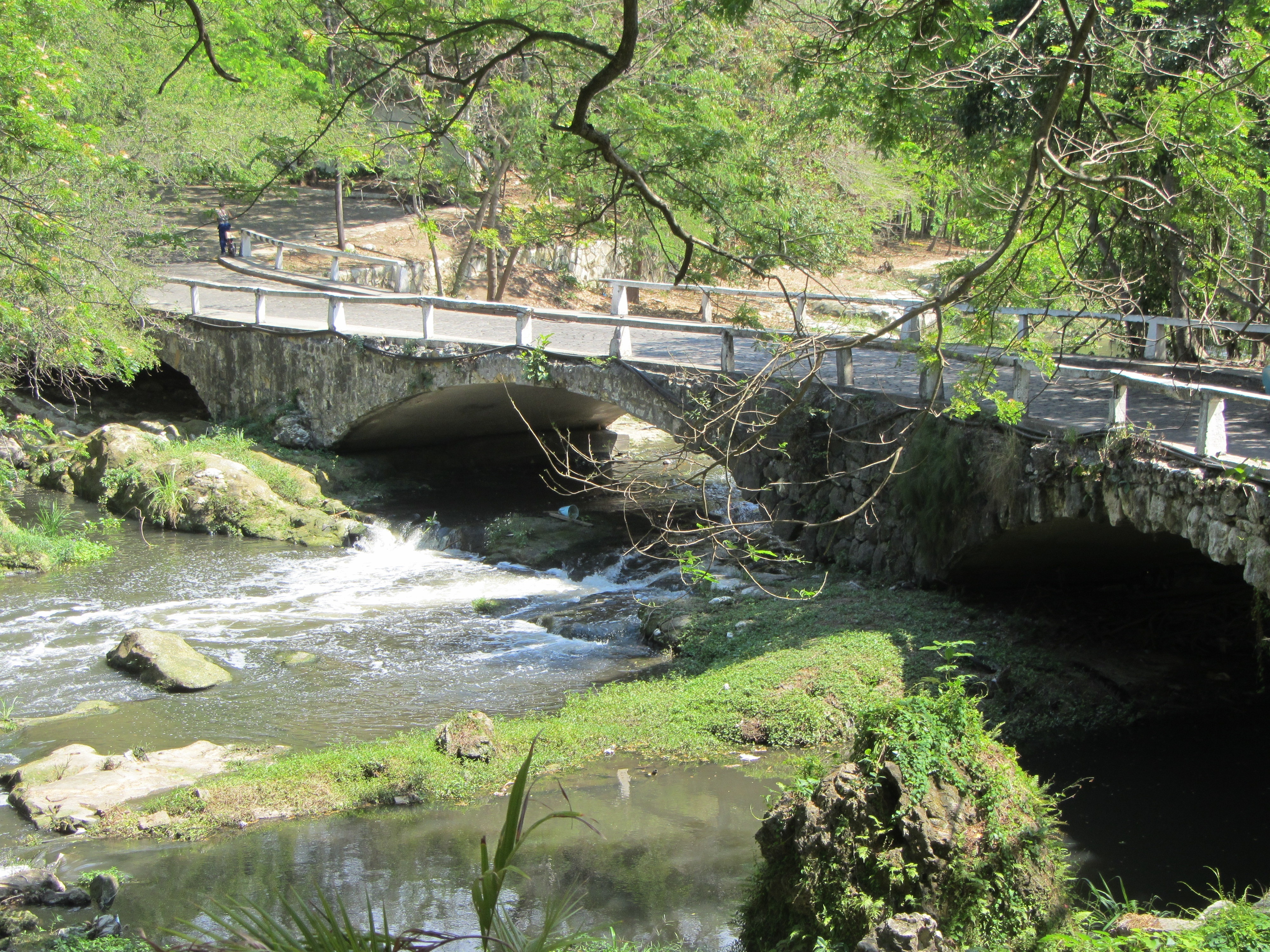

Location
- Country: Cuba

Physical characteristics
- Length: 47 km (29 mi)

The Almendares River is a river that runs for 47 km in the western part of Cuba. It originates from the east of Tapaste and flows into the Straits of Florida. The river acts as a water supply for Havana.

The final stretch divides the municipalities of Plaza de la Revolución (Vedado district) and Playa (Miramar district). Part of the river valley forms the Almendares Park or Metropolitan Park of Havana (PMH), a few kilometers upstream from the ocean.

== History ==
The Cuban aborigines called it Casiguaguas, and the first colonizers named it La Chorrera, and later renamed it Almendares in honor of the Bishop of Havana, Enrique Almendaris.

== Gallery ==
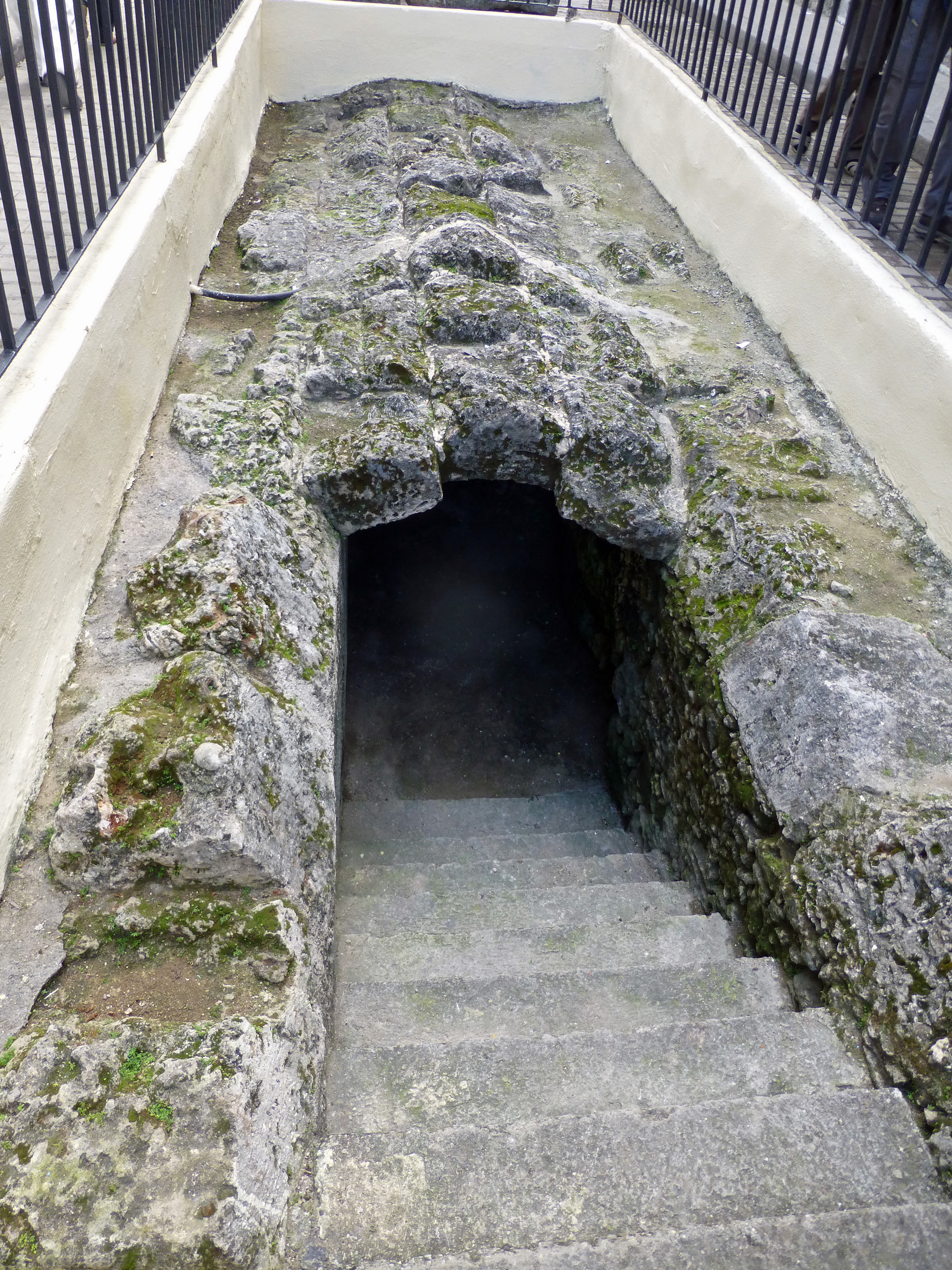
Zanja Real was an aqueduct near the Almendares River
