= Tucumcari Public Schools =

School district in New Mexico, U.S.

Tucumcari Public Schools, previously known as Tucumcari Municipal Schools, is a school district headquartered in Tucumcari, New Mexico. It operates Tucumcari Elementary School, Tucumcari Middle School, and Tucumcari High School. The district operated Mountain View Elementary School from the 1950s to the 1990s.

The district is entirely in Quay County.
