= Odeon Theater (Tucumcari, New Mexico) =

- U.S. National Register of Historic Places
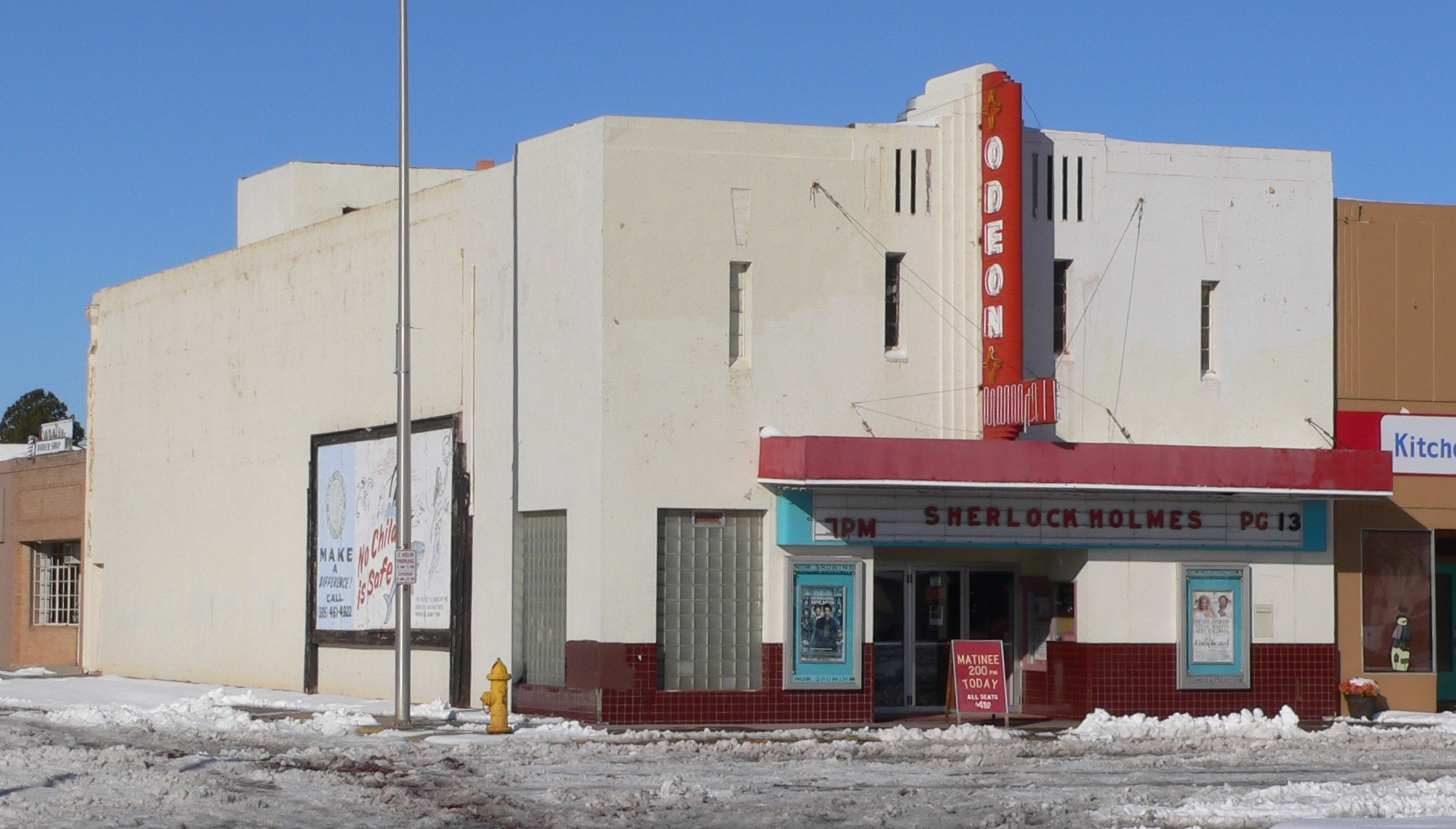

- Location within New Mexico Location within the United States
- Location: 123 South Second St., Tucumcari, New Mexico
- Coordinates: 35°10′48″N 103°43′37″W
- Area: less than one acre
- Built: 1936
- Architectural style: Art Deco
- MPS: Movie Theaters in New Mexico MPS
- NRHP reference No.: 06001254
- Added to NRHP: January 17, 2007

== Overview ==
The Odeon Theater in Tucumcari, New Mexico is a distinctive Art Deco landmark. It is located on South 2nd Street a few blocks from the town's railroad depot. The theater was built in 1936, and was listed on the National Register of Historic Places on January 17, 2007.

It is a two-story building with stucco-faced clay tile walls on a concrete foundation. It has a flat roof with a stepped parapet, with a fluted vertical column rising above. Its Art Deco elements include its use of glass blocks, of decorative geometrical molding, and of Art Deco style lettering of its neon sign.

== Highways ==
- I-40
- US 54
- NM 209
