= Blue Swallow Motel =

Historic place in New Mexico, United States

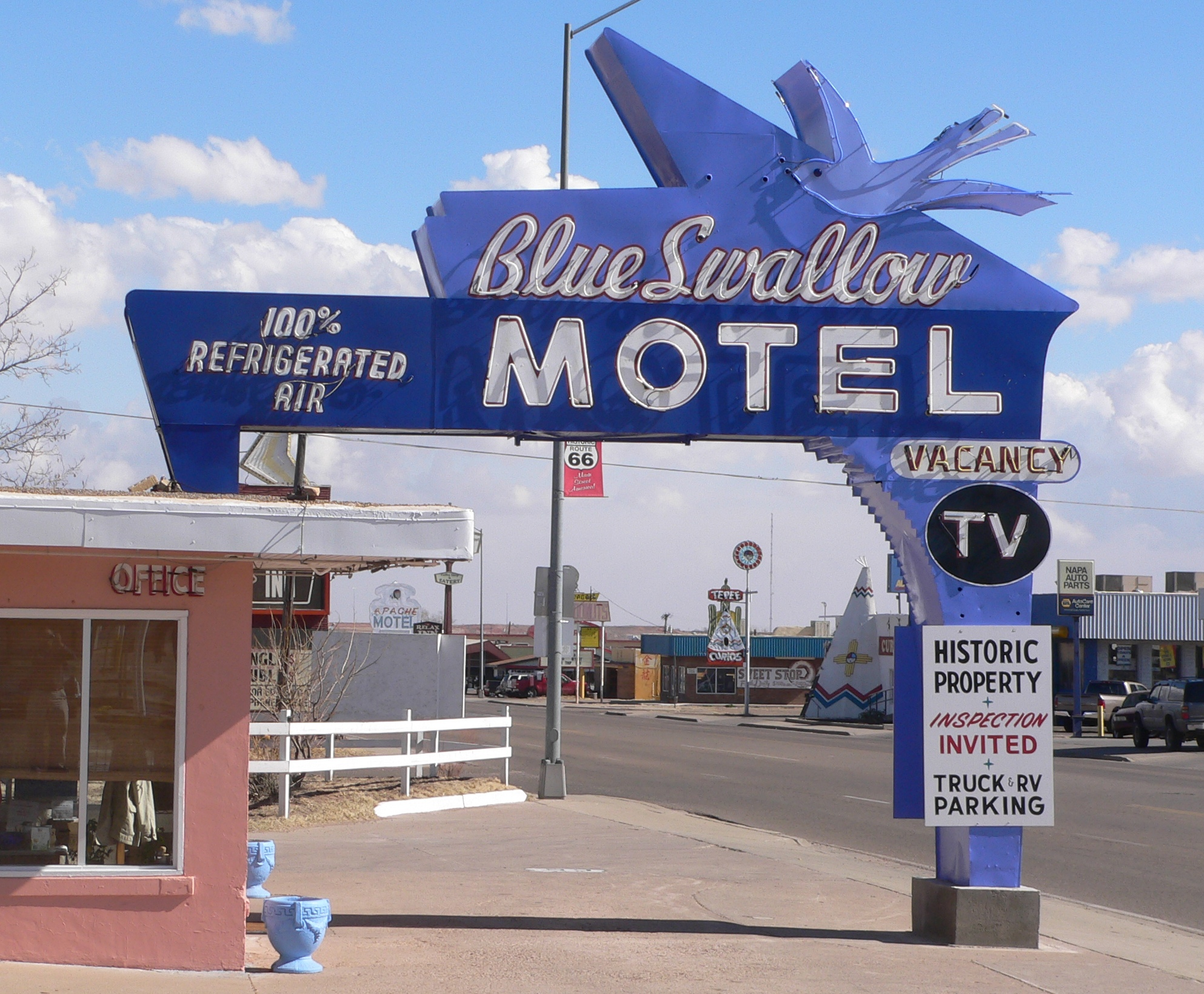
- Interactive map of the Blue Swallow Motel area

General information
- Location: Tucumcari, New Mexico, 815 E Tucumcari Blvd

Other information
- Number of rooms: 14

Website
- www.blueswallowmotel.com
- Blue Swallow Motel
- U.S. National Register of Historic Places
- NM State Register of Cultural Properties
- Location within New Mexico Location within the United States
- Coordinates: 35.171866°N 103.716421°W
- Area: U.S. Route 66 in New Mexico
- Built: 1939
- Architect: W. A. Huggins
- Architectural style: Southwest Vernacular
- MPS: Route 66 through New Mexico MPS
- NRHP reference No.: 93001210
- NMSRCP No.: 1575

Significant dates
- Added to NRHP: November 22, 1993
- Designated NMSRCP: September 17, 1993

The Blue Swallow Court in Tucumcari, New Mexico, United States, is a 12-unit L-shaped motel listed on the National Register of Historic Places in New Mexico as a part of historic U.S. Route 66. Original architectural features included a façade with pink stucco walls decorated with shell designs and a stepped parapet, on-site office and manager's residence, and garages located between the sleeping units for travelers to park their motorcars. It is one of the longest continuously operated motels along New Mexico's slice of Route 66. The swallow from the sign can be seen in the movie Back to the Future Part II, and inspired the creators of Pixar's movie Cars to create the "Cozy Cone Motel" (and the town of Tucumcari itself inspired the mountain in Radiator Springs).

== History ==
The motel was built by carpenter W.A. Huggins in 1939, and by July 1941 was open and operating with a café on-site. Ted and Marjorie Jones, who came to Tucumcari in 1944, were the first long-term operators of the motel. The property was purchased by Floyd Redman in 1958 as an engagement present to his wife Lillian.

As the Blue Swallow Motel, the property was updated with neon signage proclaiming "TV" and "100% Refrigerated Air". It would continue in operation through both the heyday of post-war tourism on the old US Highway system (when roadside billboards advertised "Tucumcari Tonight!" and "2000 motel rooms" for many miles) and the years of decline which followed the loss of US 66 traffic to a newly constructed Interstate 40 in the 1960s.

When Route 66 was closed to the majority of traffic and the other highway came in, I felt just like I had lost an old friend. But some of us stuck it out and are still here on Route 66.

— Lillian Redman

A resident of Tucumcari since 1923 (having arrived in New Mexico with her family in a covered wagon in 1915), Lillian Redman would operate the Blue Swallow for four decades, continuing independently after Floyd's death in 1973 and ultimately selling the motel in 1998. She then moved to a small house nearby and would often visit the property and its new owners until her death, at 89 years of age, in 1999.

== Restoration ==
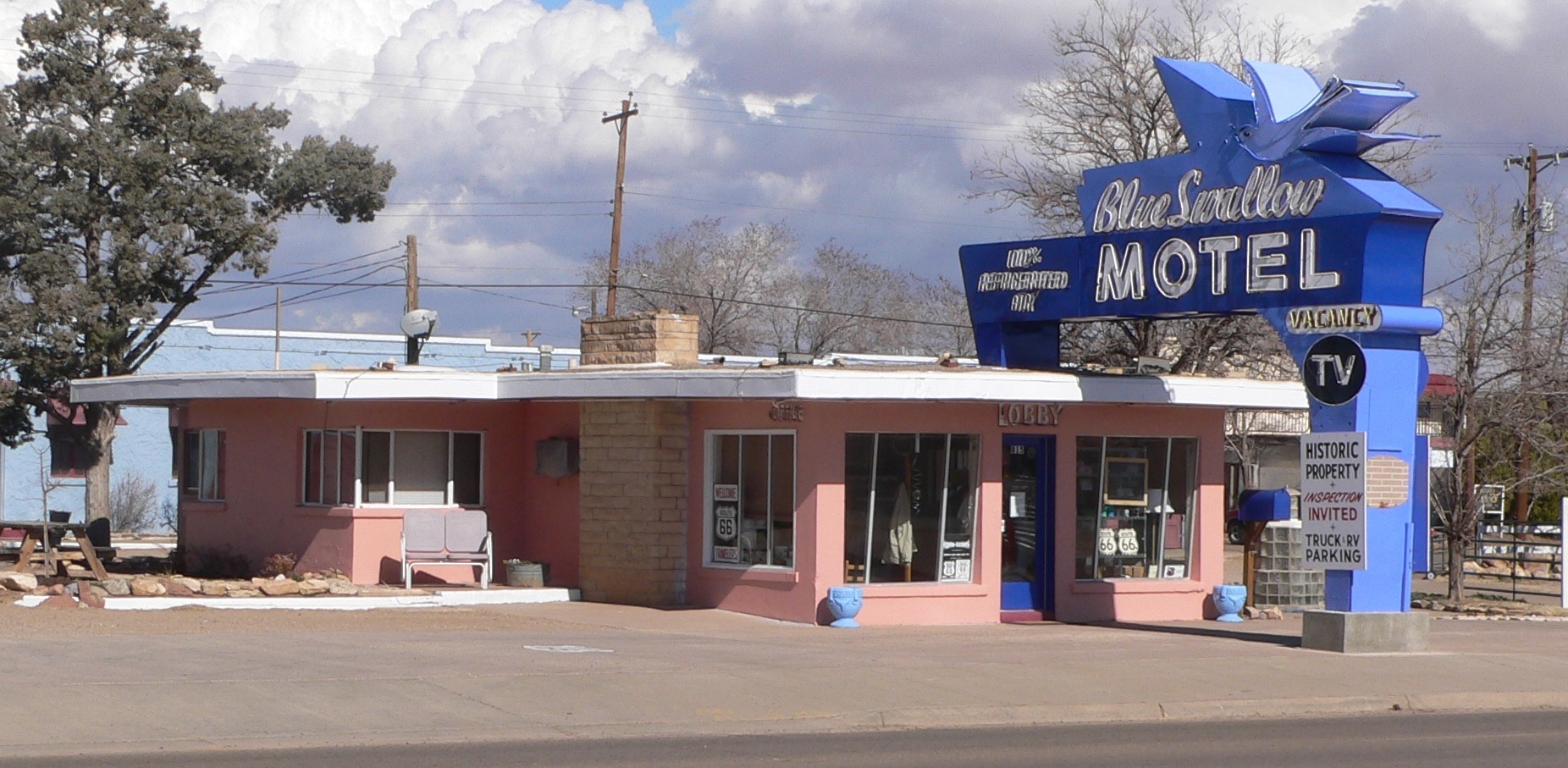
Blue Swallow Motel on U.S. Route 66, 2012

After Lillian Redman sold the motel in 1998, owners Dale and Hilda Bakke made substantial restoration efforts, repairing the 1960 neon lighting, adding a vintage rotary phone system, replacing hardwood flooring with carpeting and monochrome television sets with color TVs. Each room includes vintage lighting and period furniture. Bill and Terri Kinder purchased the Blue Swallow in 2006, selling it to Kevin and Nancy Mueller in 2011. Robert and Dawn Federico purchased the motel in 2020.

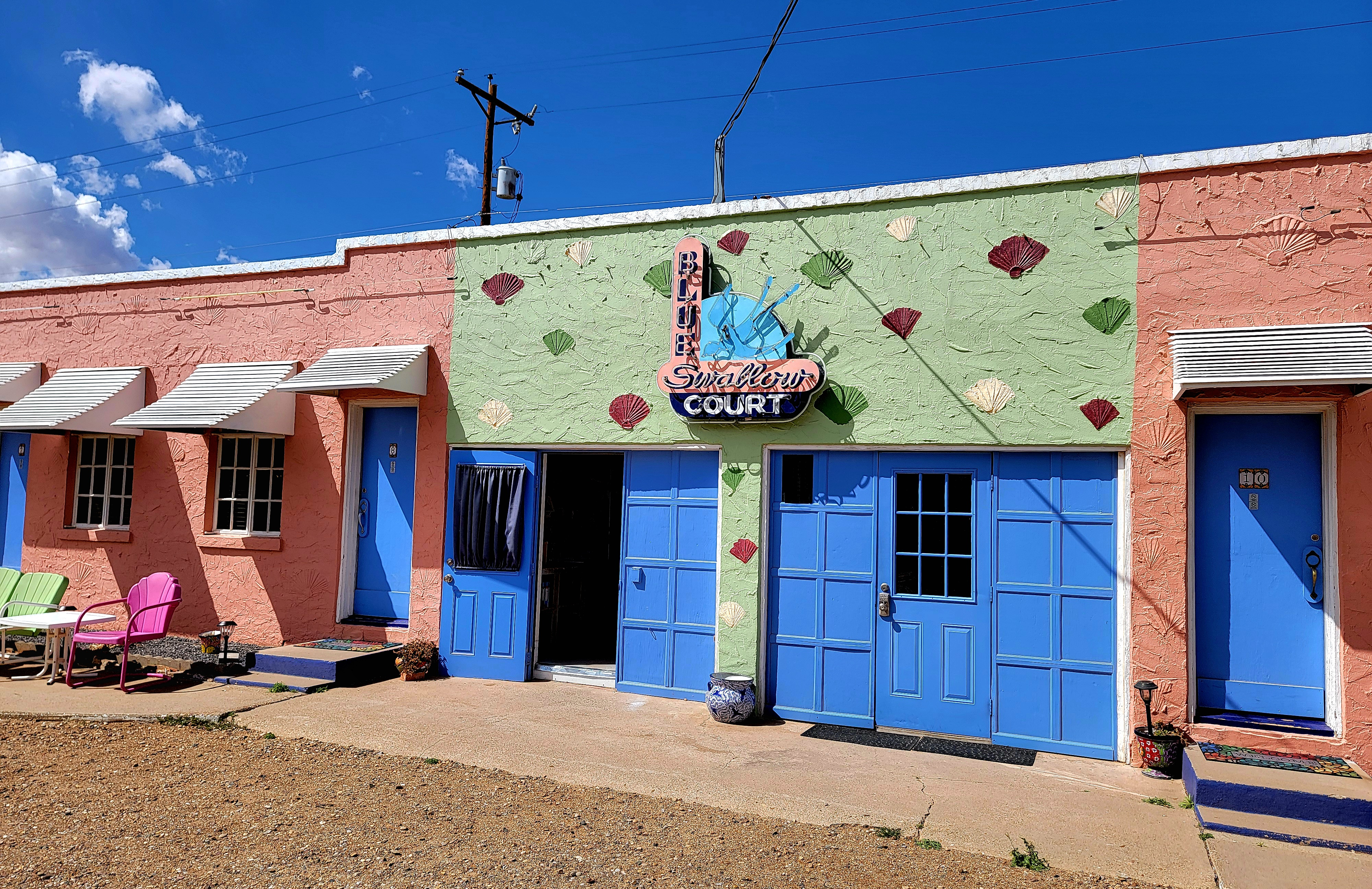
Interior court at the Blue Swallow Motel

Named by Smithsonian Magazine as "the last, best and friendliest of the old-time motels", the Blue Swallow Motel remains in profitable operation today, benefiting from publicity generated by the efforts of various Route 66 associations to keep the old highway alive. Pixar's research for the 2006 film Cars included visits to this and many other well-known Route 66 landmarks; in the film, neon lighting at the Cozy Cone Motel displays Blue Swallow's "100% Refrigerated Air" slogan.

== See also ==
- National Register of Historic Places listings in Quay County, New Mexico
- List of motels
