= Stan David =

American football player (born 1962)

No. 59
- Position: Linebacker

Personal information
- Born: February 17, 1962 (age 64); North Platte, Nebraska, U.S.
- Listed height: 6 ft 3 in (1.91 m)
- Listed weight: 210 lb (95 kg)

Career information
- College: Texas Tech
- NFL draft: 1984: 7th round, 182nd overall pick

Career history
- Buffalo Bills (1984); Kansas City Chiefs (1986); San Diego Chargers (1987)*; Denver Broncos (1987)
- * Offseason or practice squad member only

Awards and highlights
- Second-team All-SWC (1983)

Career NFL statistics
- Sacks: 1
- Stats at Pro Football Reference

Stanley Chaunce David (born on February 17, 1962) is an American retired professional football player. He was a linebacker for the Buffalo Bills of the National Football League (NFL). He appears as number 48 on Sports Illustrated 's list The 50 Greatest New Mexico Sports Figures.

== Early life, family and education ==
David graduated from Tucumcari High School in Tucumcari, New Mexico.

== College ==
He played college football for the Texas Tech Red Raiders as a safety.

== Professional football career ==
David was selected in the seventh round of the 1984 NFL draft with the 182nd pick overall pick.

== Career after football ==
David was a city manager of Denver City, Texas.
