= Cactus Motor Lodge =

- U.S. National Register of Historic Places
- NM State Register of Cultural Properties
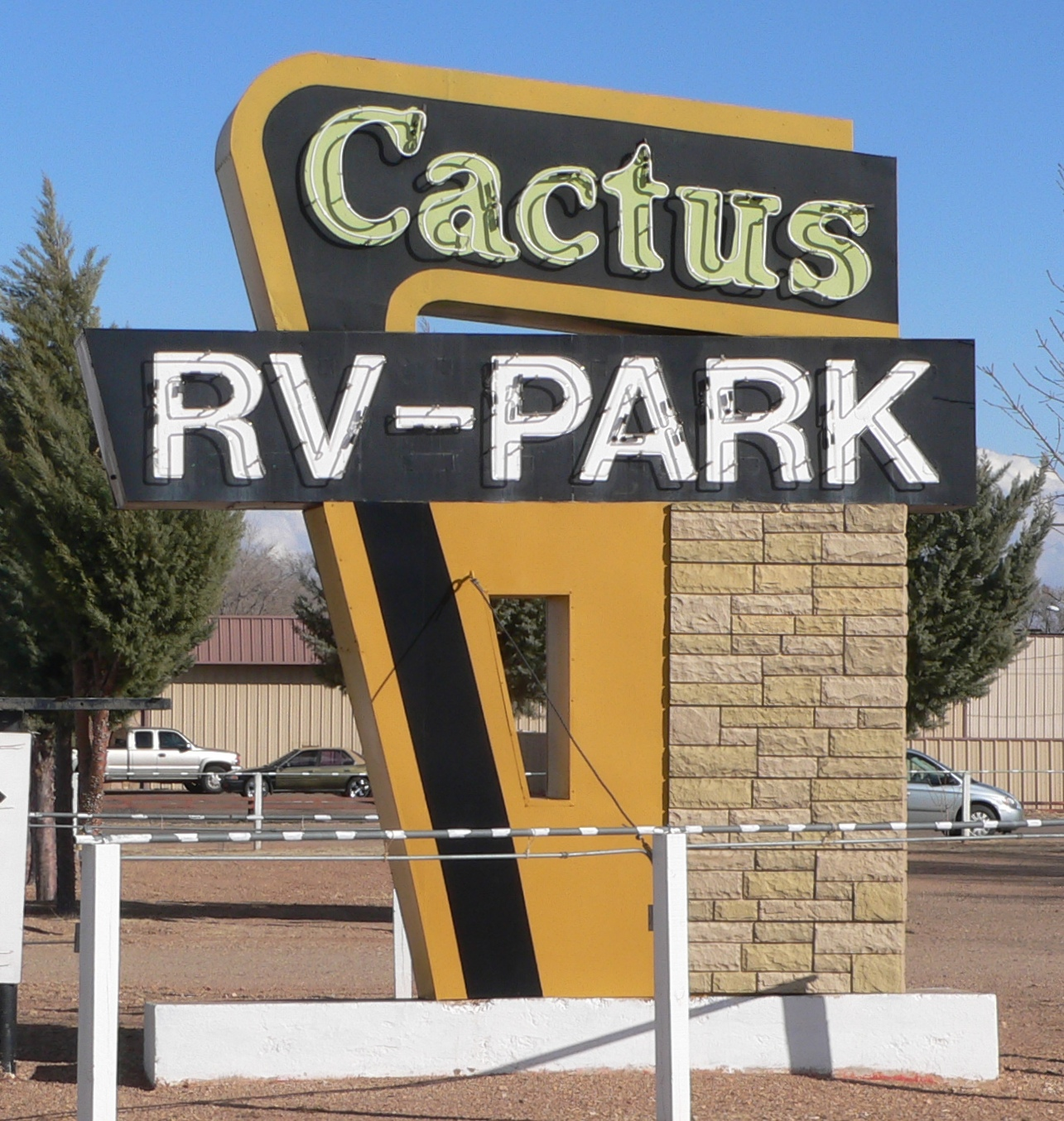
- Historic neon sign for the lodge (removed October 2018)

- Location within New Mexico Location within the United States
- Location: 1316 E. Route 66 Blvd., Tucumcari, New Mexico
- Coordinates: 35°10′24″N 103°42′37″W
- Area: 3 acres (1.2 ha)
- Built: 1941
- Architectural style: Exotic Revival
- MPS: Route 66 through New Mexico MPS
- NRHP reference No.: 06000154
- NMSRCP No.: 1887

Significant dates
- Added to NRHP: March 21, 2006
- Designated NMSRCP: December 5, 2005

The Cactus Motor Lodge, later known as the Cactus RV Park, was a motel located along historic U.S. Route 66 in Tucumcari, New Mexico. I.E. and Edna Perry built the lodge in 1941. The motel included three wings of units forming a "U" shape and an office, the latter of which was a dance hall when the motel opened. In 1952, Norm Wegner purchased the motel; Wegner added an artificial stone exterior to the buildings and converted the dance hall to an office. After Route 66 was decommissioned, the motel lost much of its business, and by the 1990s it became an RV park; the motel units fell into disuse. The motel's neon sign was restored in 2008. In October 2018, the sign was sold and removed to be relocated to an Albuquerque neon-sign park. Many other items were sold off before the owners sold the property itself to O'Reilly Auto Parts. O'Reilly razed all structures before beginning construction of their store at the location.

The motel was added to the National Register of Historic Places on March 21, 2006.

== Gallery ==
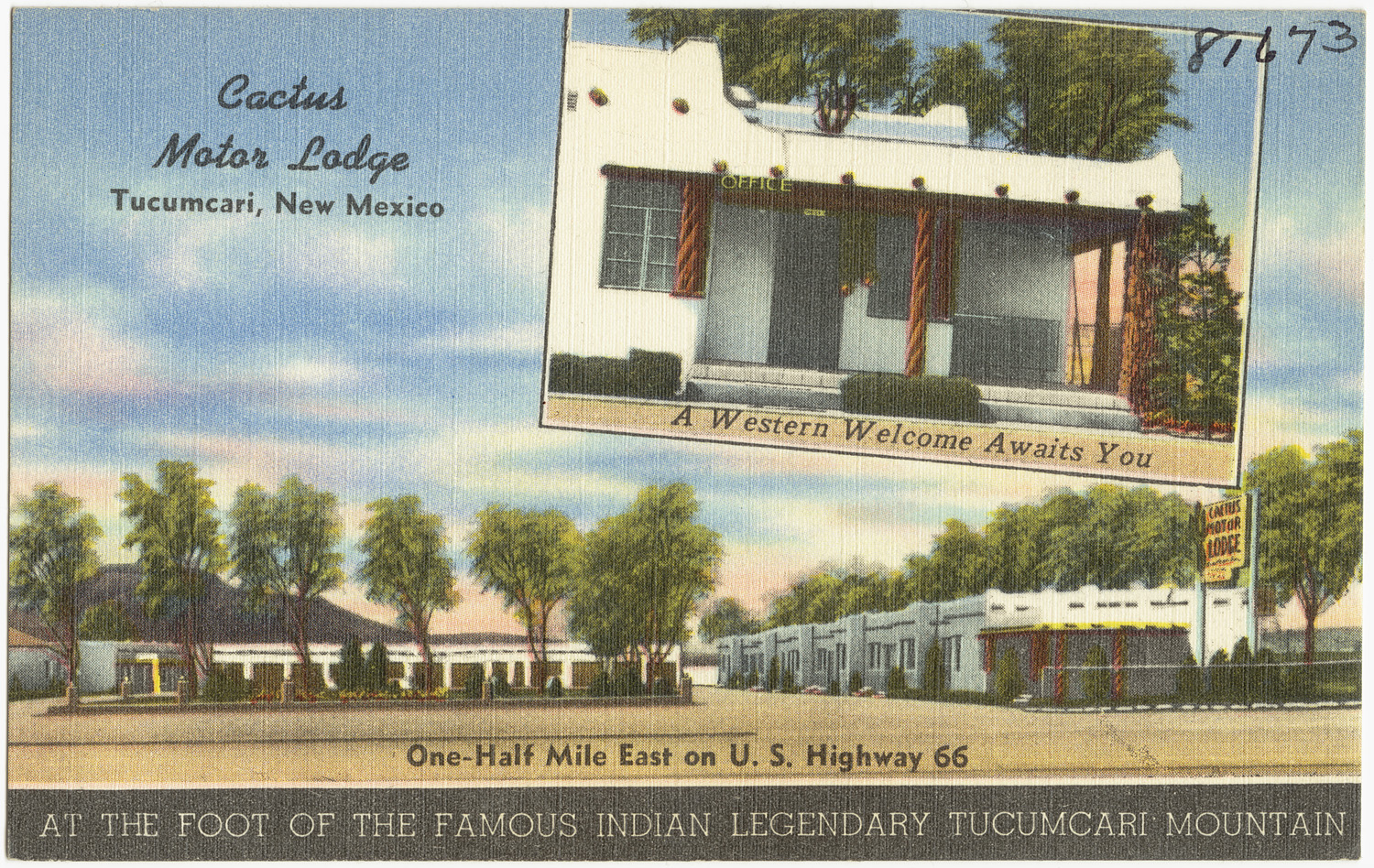
Postcard promoting the motor lodge

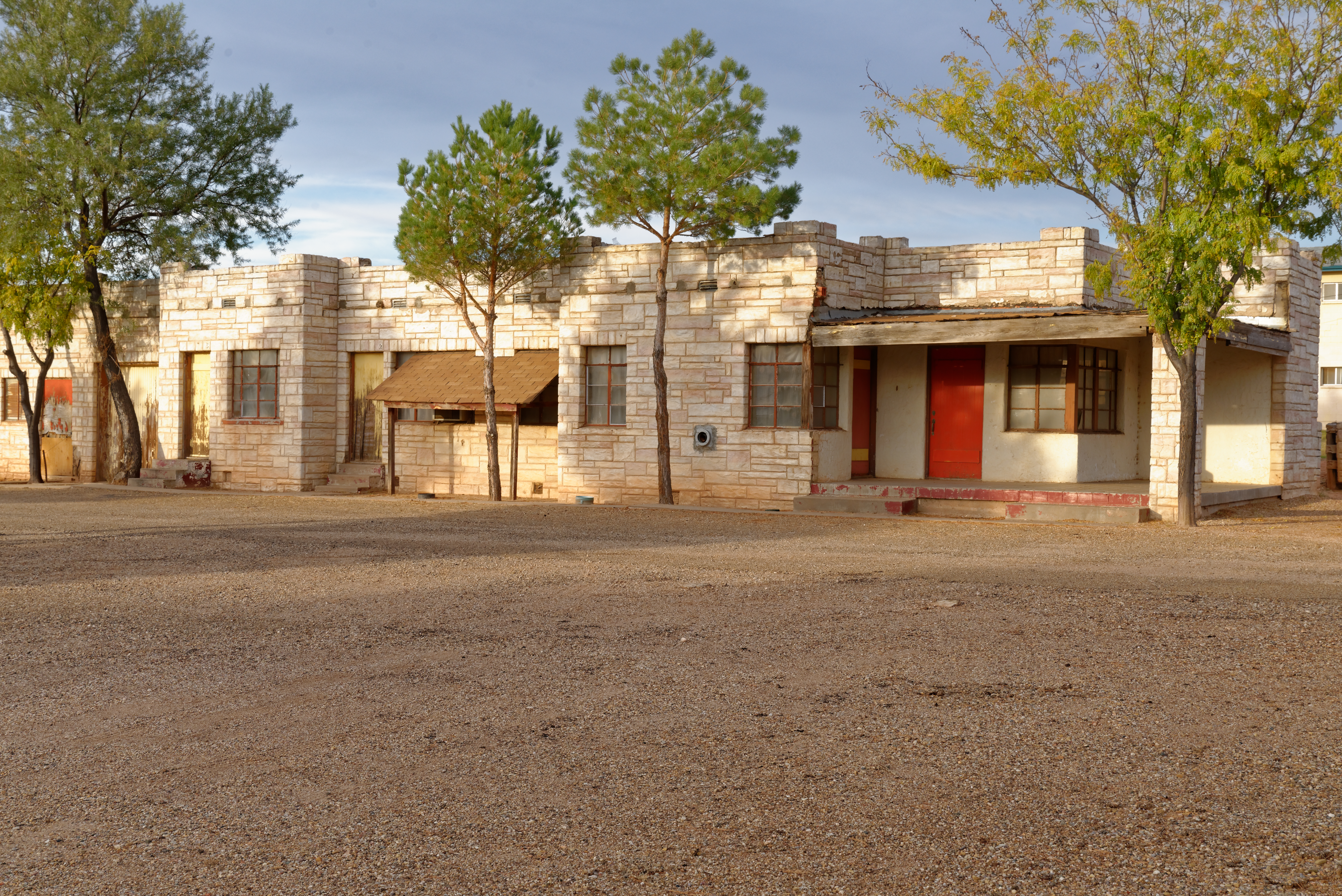
Buildings in 2018

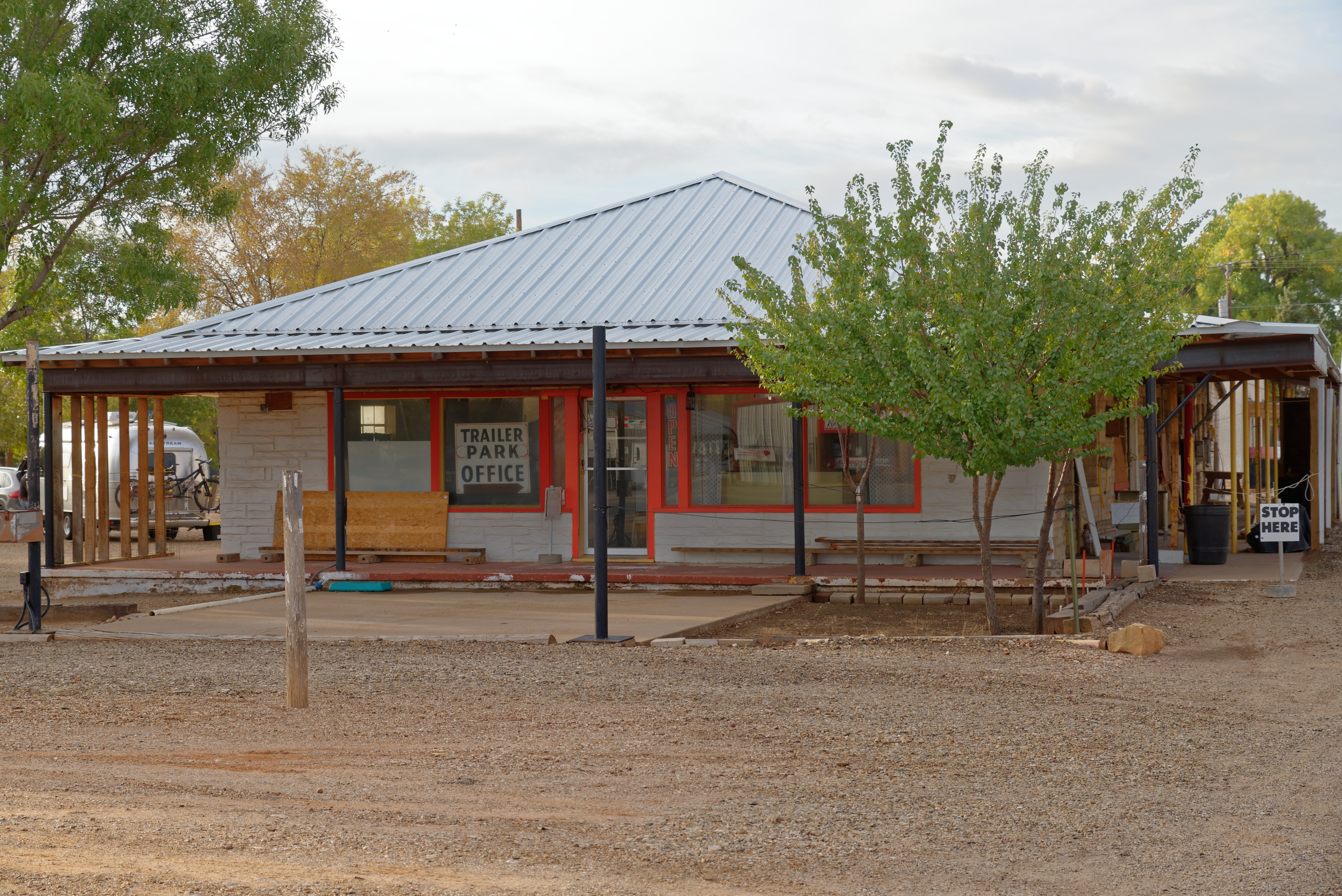
Office in 2018

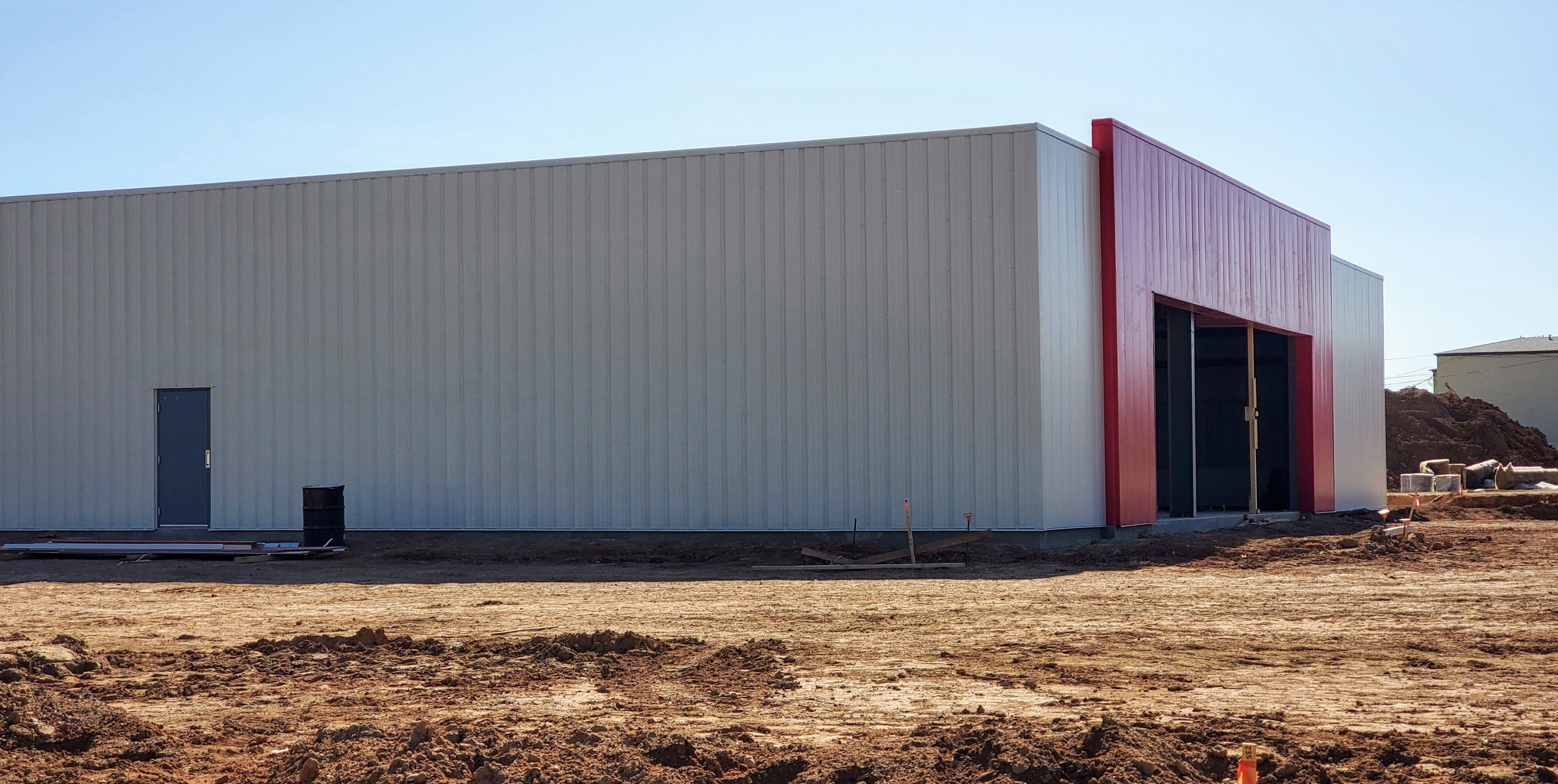
An O'Reilly Auto Parts store under construction at the location on April 7, 2021

== See also ==
- National Register of Historic Places listings in Quay County, New Mexico
- List of motels
