= Tucumcari High School =

Location
- 1001 South 7th Street; Tucumcari, Quay County, New Mexico 88401; United States
- 35.1680°N 103.7296°W

Information
- Type: Public
- Established: 1909
- NCES District ID: 3502640
- Superintendent: David Johnson
- NCES School ID: 350264000599
- Principal: Nicole Bright-Lesly
- Grades: 9-12
- Enrollment: 247
- Student to teacher ratio: 14.83
- Colors: Purple, Gold
- Mascot: Rattler
- Website: www.tucumcarischools.com/o/tps/page/tucumcari-high-school

Tucumcari High School is a public high school in New Mexico. More than two thirds of students are hispanic and 100 percent of students are categorized as economically disadvantaged. It is in the Tucumcari Public Schools district.

In 2026 it had about 210 students in grades 9 to 12. Almost 70 percent of students were hispanic and 30 percent white. All of the students were categorized as economically disadvantaged and all qualified for the free lunch program.

== History ==
Construction of Tucumcari High School started in 1909, with a cornerstone ceremony taking place on July 4 of that year. The first classes started that September.

In 1931, the original building was succeeded by a newer building at a cost of $85,000. In 1960, voters approved a $692,000 bond initiative to rebuild the school again.

In 1984, the school made national headlines after a star athlete committed suicide. 1,700 people attended his funeral, which took place in the gymnasium of the school.

== Notable alumni ==
- Stan David, professional football linebacker

== See also ==
- List of high schools in New Mexico
