= Baca–Goodman House =

Historic house in New Mexico, United States

- Formerly listed on the U.S. National Register of Historic Places
- Formerly listed on the New Mexico State Register of Cultural Properties
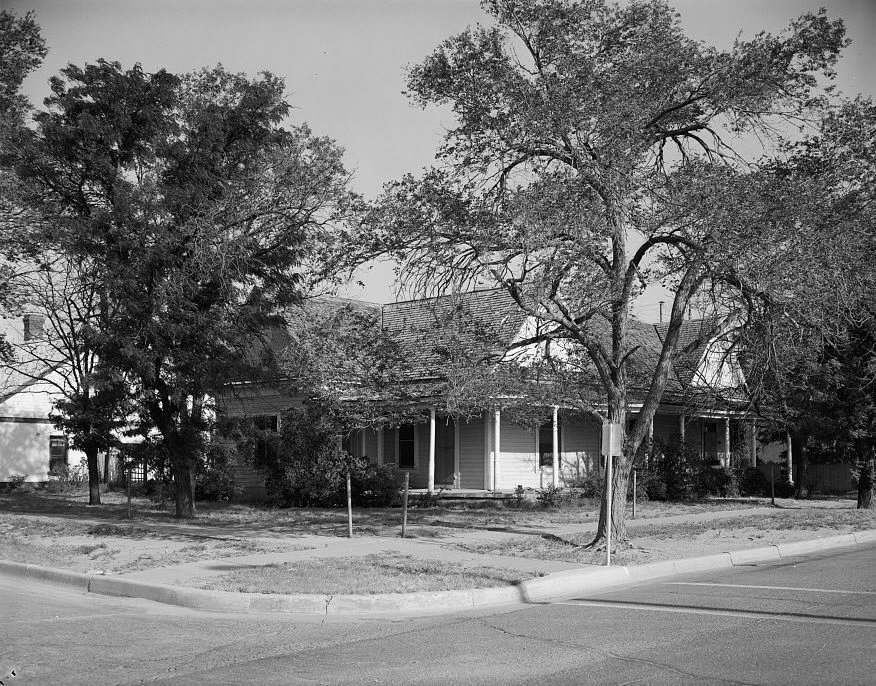
- Baca–Goodman House in 1976

- Location within New Mexico Location within the United States
- Location: Aber and 3rd Sts., Tucumcari, New Mexico
- Coordinates: 35°10′38″N 103°43′40″W
- Area: 0.5 acres (0.20 ha)
- Built: 1905
- NRHP reference No.: 73002246
- NMSRCP No.: 268

Significant dates
- Added to NRHP: August 14, 1973
- Designated NMSRCP: February 21, 1973
- Removed from NRHP: January 1, 1977
- Delisted NMSRCP: January 1, 1977

The Baca–Goodman House was a single-dwelling home in Tucumcari, New Mexico, United States. Tucumcari merchant Benito Baca built the house around 1905, and subsequent owner Herman Goodman expanded it in the 1920s. It was added to the National Register of Historic Places in 1973 as an example of early 20th century New Mexico architecture, but it was removed from the register four years later.

== See also ==
- National Register of Historic Places listings in Quay County, New Mexico
