= Metropolitan Park Bathhouse and Pool Historic District =

Historic district in New Mexico, United States

- U.S. National Register of Historic Places
- U.S. Historic district
- NM State Register of Cultural Properties
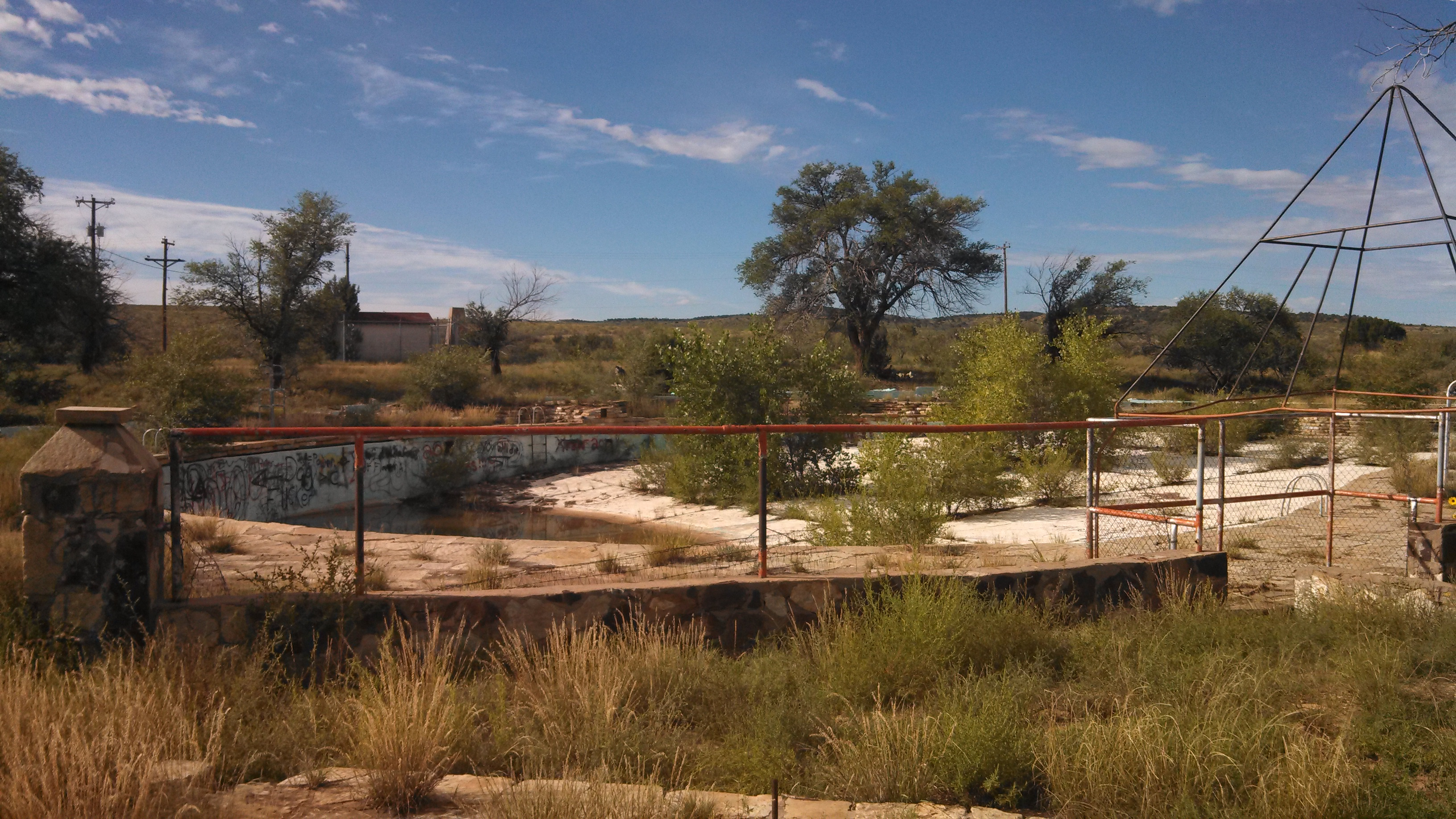

- Location within New Mexico Location within the United States
- Location: South Frontage Road of Interstate 40, 1.5 miles west of the western exit for Tucumcari, New Mexico
- Coordinates: 35°8′43″N 103°48′1″W
- Area: 1.8 acres (0.73 ha)
- Built: 1940; 86 years ago
- Built by: CCC
- Architect: Trent Thomas
- Architectural style: Mission/Spanish Revival
- MPS: New Deal in New Mexico MPS
- NRHP reference No.: 96000268
- NMSRCP No.: 1618

Significant dates
- Added to NRHP: March 15, 1996
- Designated NMSRCP: January 26, 1996

The Metropolitan Park Bathhouse and Pool Historic District, in Tucumcari in Quay County, New Mexico, was listed on the National Register of Historic Places in 1996. The listing includes one contributing building, a contributing structure, and a contributing site.

It is a 1.8-acre (0.73 ha) parcel, 240 by 330 feet (73 m × 101 m), which contains a bathhouse building, a swimming pool, and a landscaped park. The bathhouse, a one-story Spanish-Pueblo Revival style building, was built in 1940. The parcel has also been known locally as Five Mile Park and as the Apache Wells Lions Club Park.

The architect was Trent Thomas. He is also associated with:

- Valmora Sanatorium Historic District, NM 97, 4 mi. E of jct. with Hwy. 161 NE of Watrous, New Mexico (Thomas, F. Trent)
- Carlos Vierra House, 1002 Old Pecos Trail, Santa Fe, New Mexico (Thomas, Trent)
