= Metropolitan Park of Havana =

Park in Havana, Cuba

Havana Metropolitan Park
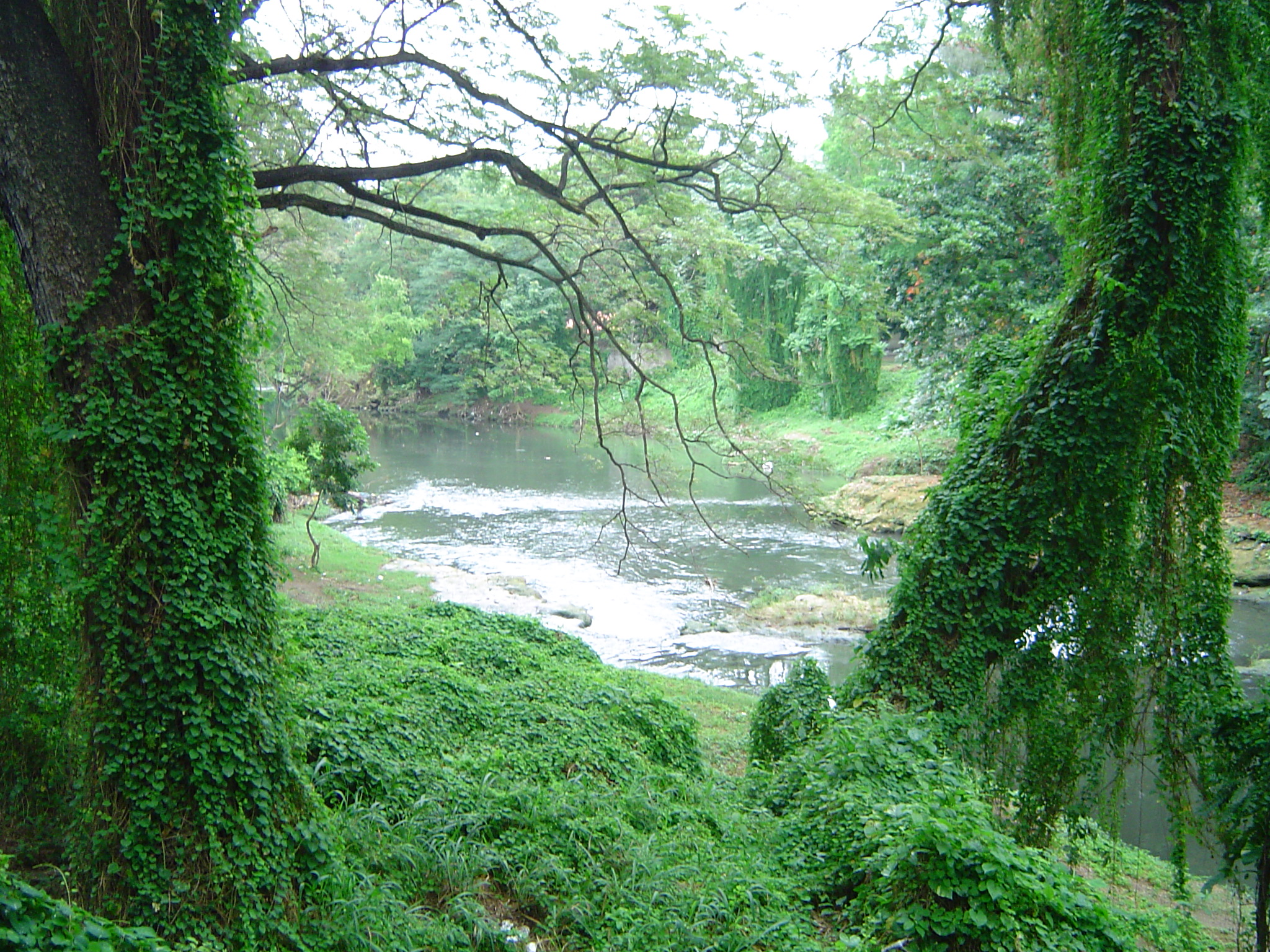
- View of the park's vegetation and the Almendares River
- Interactive map of Havana Metropolitan Park
- Type: Urban park
- Location: Playa and Plaza de la Revolución, La Habana Province, Cuba
- Coordinates: 23.113°N 82.408°W
- Area: 700 ha (1,700 acres)
- Created: 1989
- Status: Open all year
- Adjacent roads: Quinta Avenida, Avenida 23, Avenida 41

The Havana Metropolitan Park, sometimes referred to as the Grand Metropolitan Park, is an urban natural area located in Havana, Cuba.

== Location ==
The park is situated along the final course of the Almendares River between the municipalities of Playa and Plaza de la Revolución in Havana. Its location lies between central city areas such as El Vedado and residential neighborhoods like Miramar.

It covers more than 700 hectares, encompassing the former Botanical Garden, Havana Forest, Almendares Park, the Tropical and Polar Gardens, and Loma del Husillo.

== History ==
Plans for a metropolitan park along the Almendares River date back to Havana's early 20th-century urban planning, which envisioned a network of interconnected green spaces.

In the 1920s, Carlos Miguel de Céspedes, Minister of Public Works under President Gerardo Machado, invited the French urban planner Jean-Claude Nicolas Forestier to advise on Havana's urban design. Forestier, then Deputy Conservator of Parisian Parks, proposed creating large green spaces and interconnected park systems in Havana, including the idea of a park along the Almendares River basin.

By the mid-20th century, the riverbanks hosted recreational areas, including the National Zoological Park of Cuba, opened in 1939, as well as the old Almendares Park, which from 1959 had playgrounds, cafés, and rest areas.

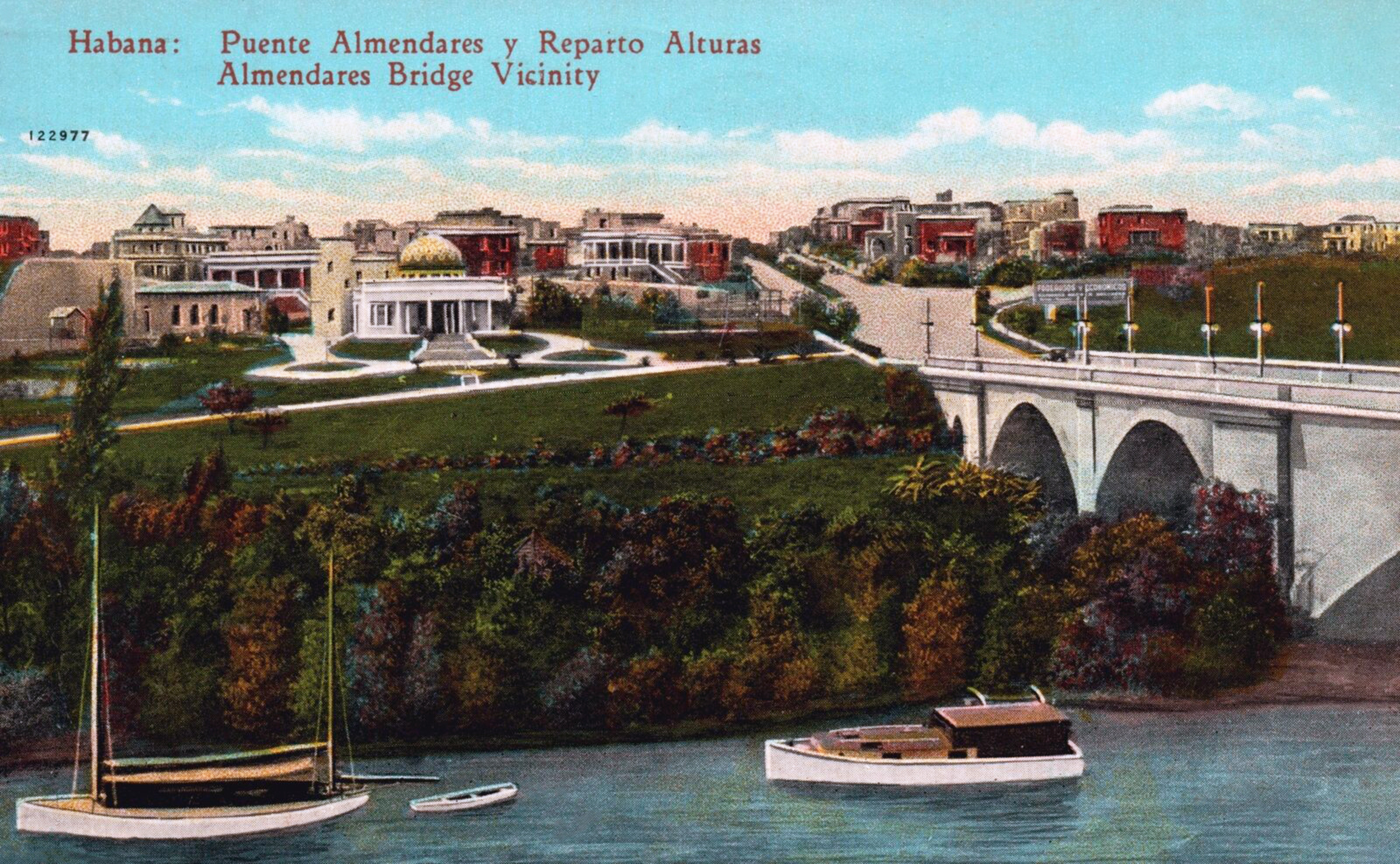
Postcard of the Almendares River and its bridge, circa 1928

The idea of a city-integrated metropolitan park appeared in various urban planning documents over the decades. It is mentioned in the 1963 Master Plan of Havana, although its formal implementation only occurred in the late 1980s with budget allocations and the official establishment of the park as a large-scale environmental and recreational project.

The park project was completed in 1989 and formally inaugurated on 29 September 1989 by Fidel Castro.

Since its creation, the park has aimed to integrate green zones, recreational areas, and residential communities along the 9.5 km lower Almendares River basin to support environmental conservation and public recreation.

== Features ==
=== Physical features ===
The park stretches along the Almendares River valley, shaped by erosion and sedimentation. Its terrain is mostly flat to gently undulating, with river terraces and alluvial soils supporting dense vegetation.

Vegetation cover and proximity to the river create a local microclimate with higher humidity and slightly lower temperatures than surrounding urban areas, contributing to environmental regulation within Havana.

=== Urban context ===
Unlike other Cuban urban parks, the area includes consolidated residential settlements with over 200,000 inhabitants in neighborhoods such as El Husillo, Kohly, Nuevo Vedado, El Fanguito, and Puentes Grandes. This coexistence influences park management and conservation strategies.

Over 230 facilities exist within and near the park, including industries, hospitals, schools, and service centers. The Almendares River and its tributaries cross sections of the Cerro, Plaza de la Revolución, and Playa municipalities.

== Management ==
The park is administered by a state entity called Gran Parque Metropolitano de La Habana (GPMH). Management integrates environmental, recreational, and social functions coordinated with municipal and provincial authorities, implementing environmental education programs, conserving forest cover, and managing public services. It aims to balance recreational use with protection of natural resources and river water quality.

Authorities have promoted community engagement in park stewardship, including maintenance of trails, rest areas, and recreational zones.

Park management also promotes ecotourism by integrating public access with environmental interpretation programs and cultural activities.

== Conservation ==
The Almendares River, the park's main waterway, was heavily polluted for decades by domestic and industrial waste. Sediment studies documented elevated concentrations of heavy metals such as zinc, lead, copper, cadmium, and chromium.

Pollution also included untreated wastewater, plastic waste, and industrial debris, impacting aquatic organisms and ecosystem functionality.

Restoration efforts since the park's creation included wastewater treatment, closing industrial discharge points, and reforestation along the riverbanks to reduce erosion.

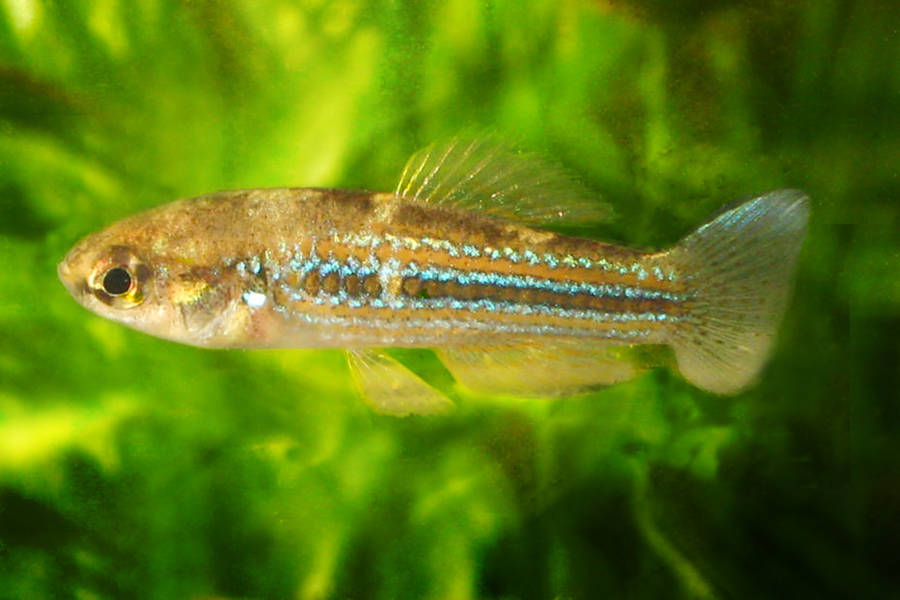
Cubanichthys cubensis (Cuban killifish) has returned to some river sections, indicating improved water quality due to conservation and wastewater treatment.

Closure of polluting industries and modernization of industrial processes reduced industrial discharges, contributing to improved dissolved oxygen levels and the return of fish in the river.

Restoration remains ongoing due to residual pollutants, diffuse inputs, and the need for continuous water quality monitoring.

== Infrastructure and uses ==
The park includes ecological zones as well as recreational and cultural facilities for walking, outdoor activities, concerts, and community events. Facilities include walking paths, picnic areas, amphitheaters, sports areas, playgrounds, mini-golf, and boat rentals.

== Subparks and complexes ==
The park integrates preexisting natural, recreational, and historic sites along the lower Almendares River, such as Havana Forest, the former Havana Botanical Garden (founded 1900), and the Tropical and Polar Gardens.

These areas together form a green urban corridor and one of Havana's main ecological systems.

=== Havana Forest ===
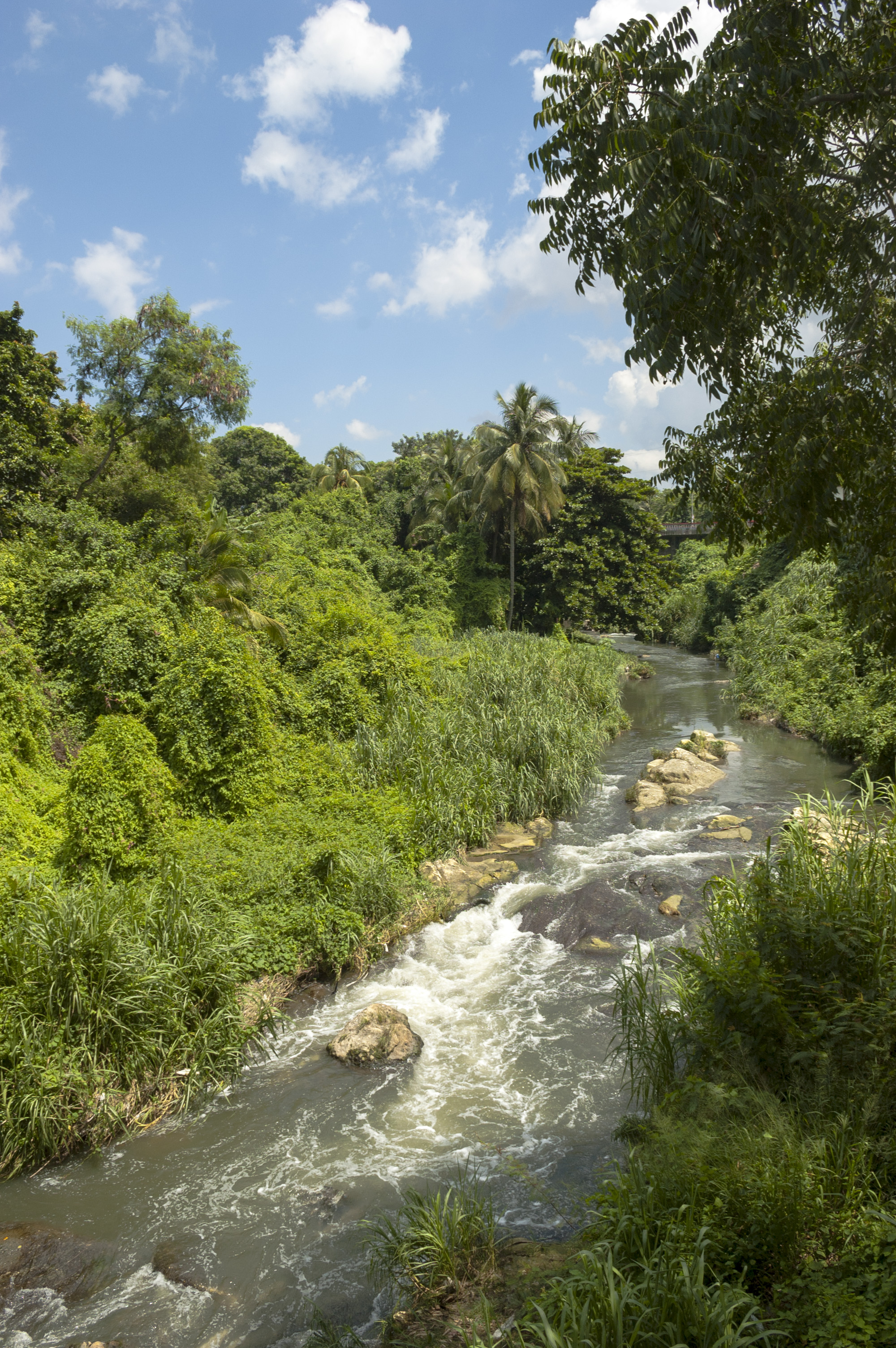
Stream tributary in Havana Forest

Havana Forest (Bosque de La Habana) is a large riparian forest with dense tropical and semi-deciduous vegetation, contributing to local biodiversity and urban microclimate regulation.

==== Josefina Island ====
Within Havana Forest, Josefina Island is a partially isolated sector during river flooding. Covering ~8.9 ha of gallery forest, it is a Protected Natural Landscape.

The name derives from Juana Gabriela de Embil Quesada (“Josefina”), 19th-century landowner.

=== Jardines de la Tropical gardens ===
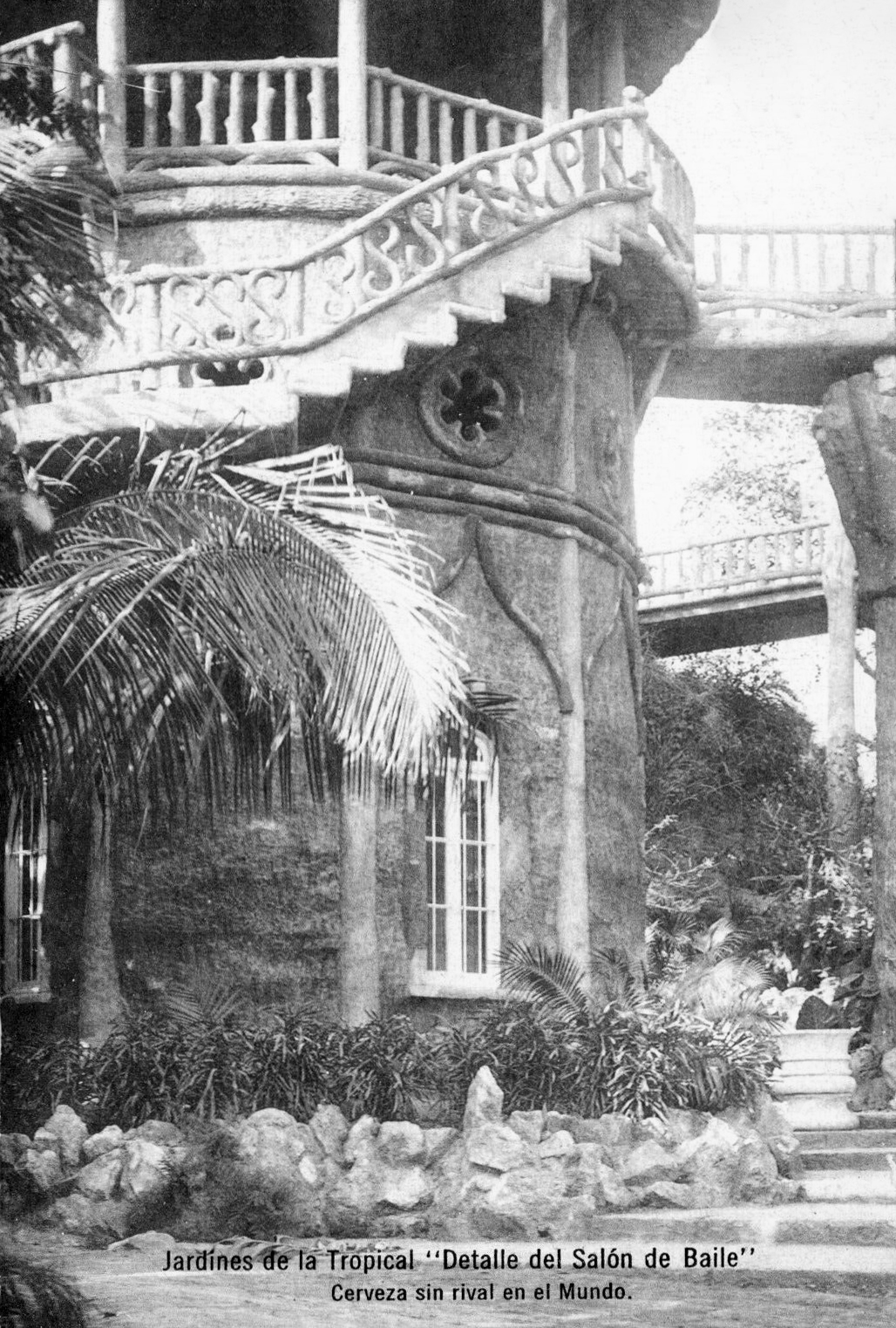
Historical view of the Ballroom at Tropical Gardens, ca.1920

Established in 1904 alongside La Tropical Brewery as a social and recreational space, with neo-Arabic architecture, fountains, and terraces oriented to the river.

Activities declined after nationalization in 1960, with partial restoration in recent years as part of the Grand Metropolitan Park.

=== Jardines de la Polar gardens ===
Polar Gardens, historically associated with the Polar Brewery, provided social and recreational space along the Almendares River, now partially abandoned and affected by informal settlements.

== Biodiversity ==
The park preserves remnants of riparian forest and associated vegetation, serving as a significant urban biological corridor. Key tree species include kapok, mast wood, golden fig, blue mahoe, and royal palm, Cuba's national tree.

In forested areas, lianas and vines form a dense canopy characteristic of tropical humid environments. Native vegetation coexists with naturalized introduced species, many of which were historically planted as urban ornamentals. Notably, the flamboyant tree (Delonix regia), native to Madagascar and widely cultivated throughout the tropical Caribbean, is among these species. The extensive vegetation cover acts as a carbon sink within the city.

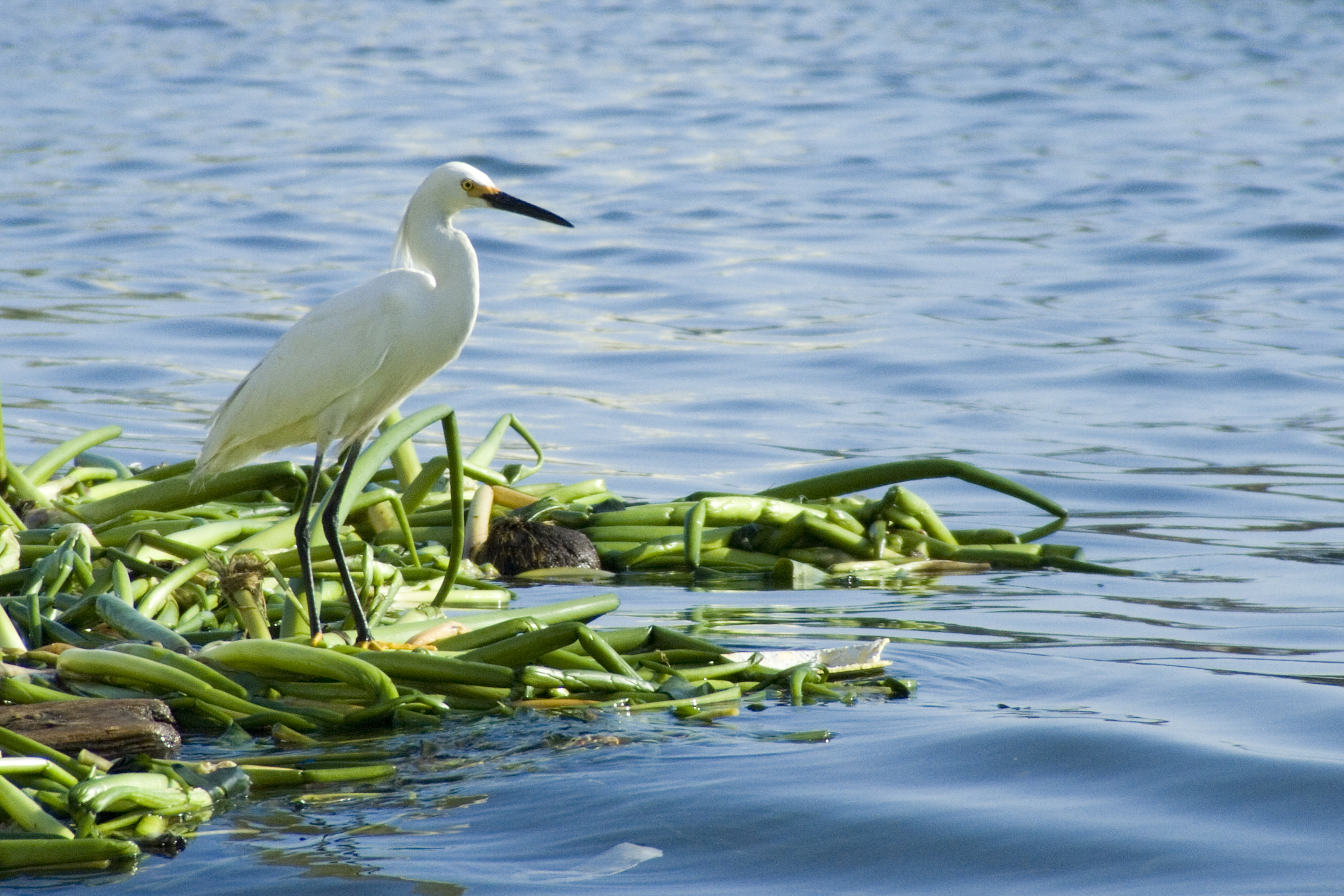
Great egret perched on reeds near the river mouth.

Birds reported in the park include the great egret (Ardea alba), the cattle egret (Bubulcus ibis), the tocororo (Priotelus temnurus), an endemic species and national symbol, and various urban passerines such as the northern mockingbird (Mimus polyglottos). These species benefit from the abundance of tree cover, water sources, and quiet areas within the park.

Terrestrial fauna includes small mammals adapted to periurban environments, such as the hutia (Capromys pilorides), as well as various insectivorous bat species that play a key ecological role in insect control and seed dispersal in forest fragments.

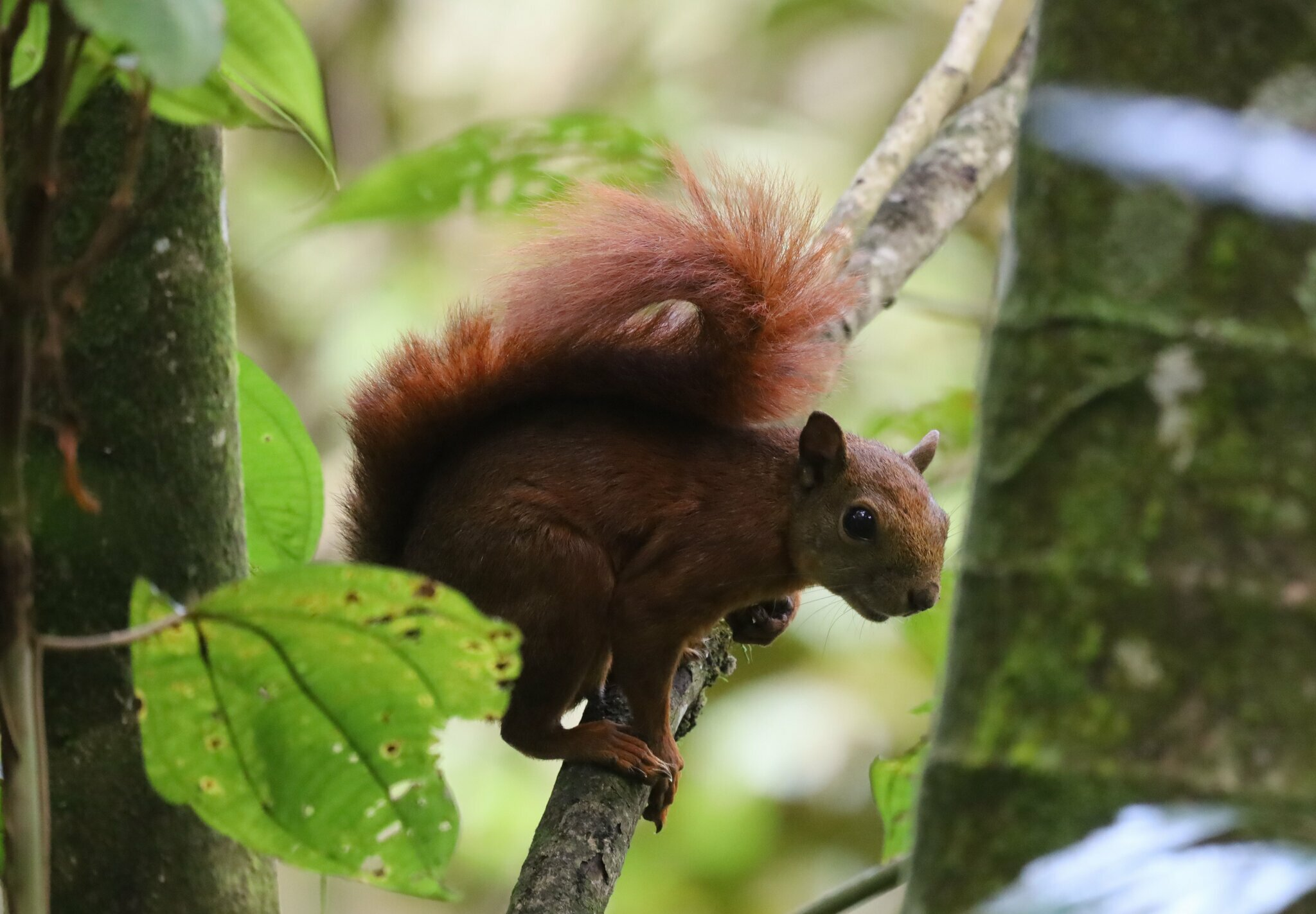
Red-tailed squirrel, an introduced species inhabiting the park and nearby areas.

In forested areas along the Almendares River, observations have been made of the red-tailed squirrel (Sciurus granatensis), a tree squirrel native to South America that has been introduced to Cuba. According to the Global Register of Introduced and Invasive Species, this species was unintentionally introduced in Havana and has established a small population along some parts of the riverbank after escaping from the Havana National Zoo (also known as Zoo 26). These introduced squirrels have been intermittently observed in Havana's green spaces, and their presence is mentioned in local studies and reports as a case of an invasive species with isolated populations within the city.

Fish documented in sections of the Almendares River flowing through the park include the Cuban killifish (Cubanichthys cubensis), tilapias (Oreochromis spp.), and tarpon (Megalops atlanticus), reflecting partial recovery of water quality after decades of pollution. Increased dissolved oxygen and reduced pollutant loads have favored the presence of these aquatic species in certain river segments.

The combination of forests, riparian areas, and open zones makes the park a significant urban biodiversity hub, supporting both the conservation of native species and the environmental well-being of Havana's residents.
