= Tucumcari Mountain =

Mountain in New Mexico, United States

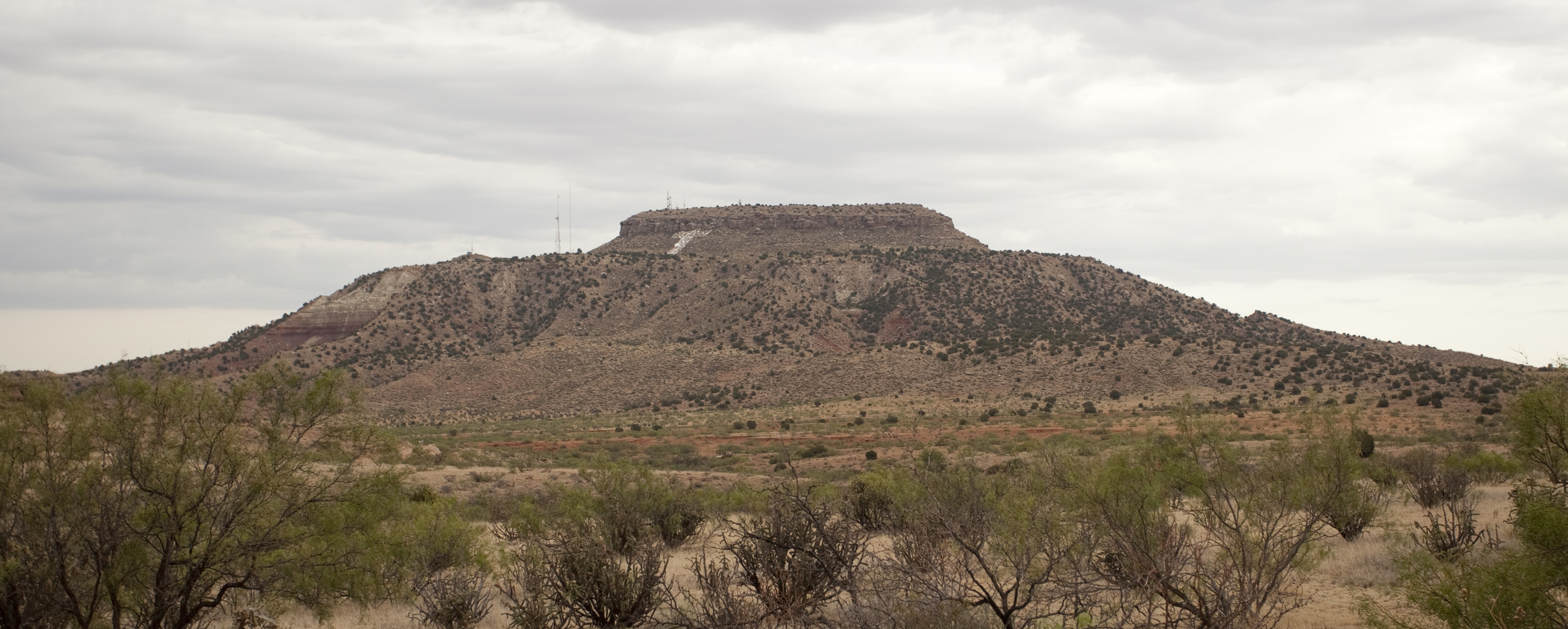
- Mesa Tucumcari viewed from the west.

Highest point
- Elevation: 4,976 ft (1,517 m) NAVD 88
- Coordinates: 35°08′04″N 103°41′55″W

Geography
- Location within New Mexico
- Location: Quay County, New Mexico, U.S.
- Topo map: USGS Tucumcari

Geology
- Rock age: Cretaceous

Climbing
- Easiest route: Drive (private land)

Tucumcari Mountain, once referred to as Tucumcari Peak or Mesa Tucumcari, is a mesa situated just outside Tucumcari, New Mexico.

Where the mountain got its name is uncertain. It may have come from the Comanche word "tukamukaru", which means to lie in wait for someone or something to approach. A 1777 burial record mentions a Comanche woman and her child captured in a battle at Cuchuncari, which is believed to be an early version of the name Tucumcari.

The mountain was a key landmark along trails used by prehistoric Puebloans and Plains Indians, as well as the later Comancheros. The Comanche often used the mountain as a lookout, climbing up it to survey the landscape for animals to hunt. Pedro Vial referred to the mountain in 1793, while opening a trail between Santa Fe and St. Louis. Captain Randolph B. Marcy led an expedition past it in 1849. The French-American geologist Jules Marcou studied the geology of Tucumcari Mountain in 1853 and claimed that the Tucumcari strata were of Jurassic age. The Texas geologist, Robert T. Hill, visited "Mesa Tucumcari" in 1887 and again in 1891, and eventually concluded that the Tucumcari strata were much younger Cretaceous deposits, not Jurassic as suggested by Marcou. Also in 1891, William F. Cummins of the Geological Survey of Texas studied Tucumcari Mountain and his careful observations of the strata established beyond doubt the Cretaceous age of the Tucumcari beds.

The town of Tucumcari was founded in 1901 and, in 1908, took its name—both in real life and in legend—from the mountain. Residents of the town of Tucumcari have painted a hillside letter T on the mountain. A cartoon version of this mountain appears in Cars with 'RS' (for Radiator Springs) substituted for Tucumcari's 'T'.

== See also ==
- Canadian River
- Caprock Escarpment
- Eastern New Mexico
- Llano Estacado
- Lucianosaurus
- Mescalero Ridge
- Pecos River
- Route 66
