= Tucumcari, New Mexico =

City in the United States

- City
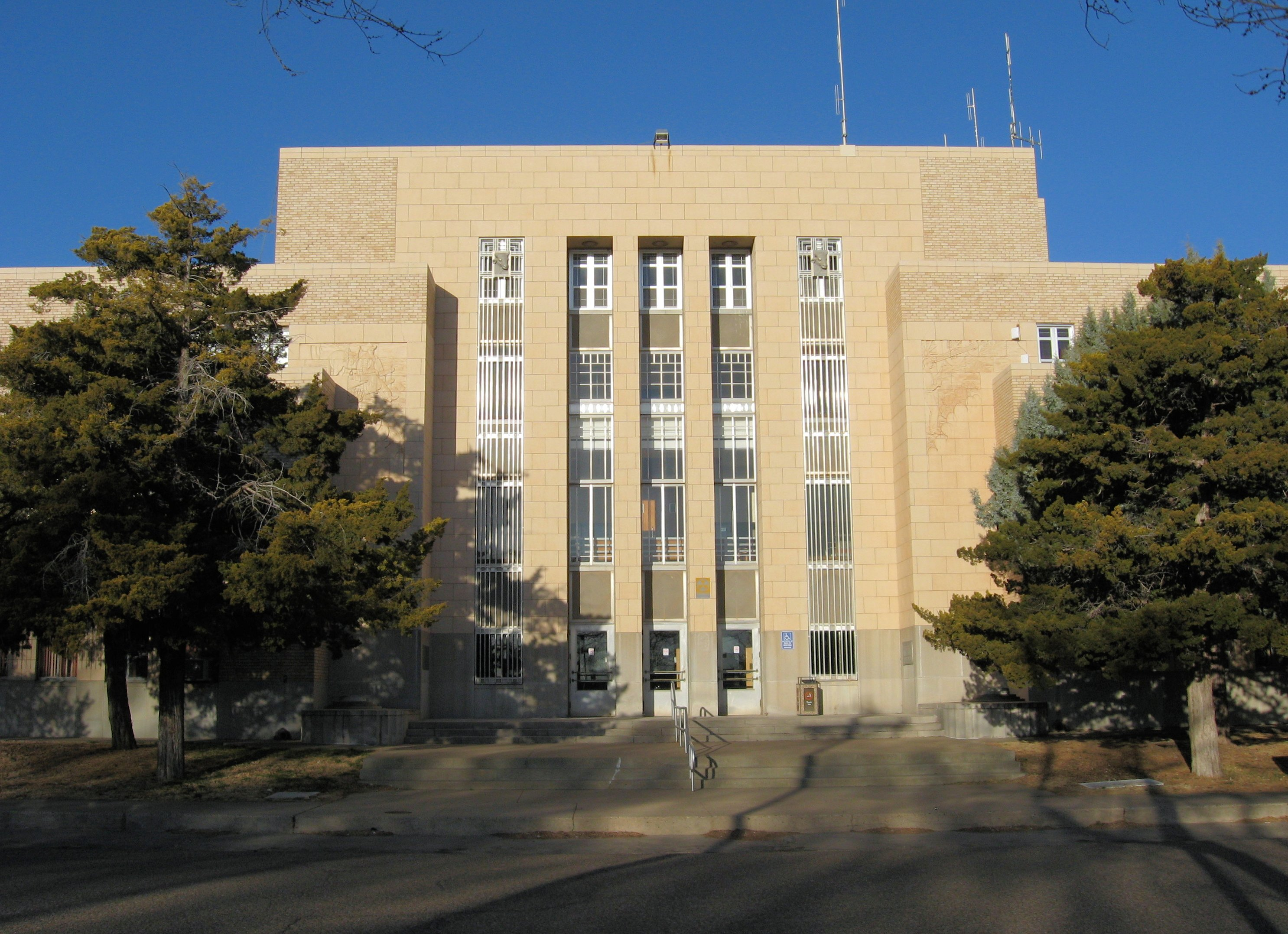
- Quay County Courthouse in 2008

- Seal

- Location of Tucumcari in New Mexico

- Location in New Mexico Location in the United States
- Coordinates: 35°10′12″N 103°43′32″W
- Country: United States
- State: New Mexico
- County: Quay
- Founded: 1901

Government
  - Mayor: Marcy Willis

Area
  - Total: 9.51 sq mi (24.63 km^{2})
  - Land: 9.51 sq mi (24.62 km^{2})
  - Water: 0 sq mi (0.00 km^{2})
- Elevation: 4,032 ft (1,229 m)

Population (2020)
  - Total: 5,278
  - Density: 555.1/sq mi (214.34/km^{2})
- Time zone: UTC−7 (MST)
  - Summer (DST): UTC−6 (MDT)
- ZIP code: 88401
- Area code: 575
- FIPS code: 35-79910
- GNIS feature ID: 2412105
- Website: cityoftucumcari.com

Tucumcari (/ˈtuːkəmˌkæriː/; TOO-cum-carry) is a city in and the county seat of Quay County, New Mexico, United States. Its population was 5,278 at the 2020 census. Tucumcari was founded in 1901, two years before Quay County was established.

== History ==
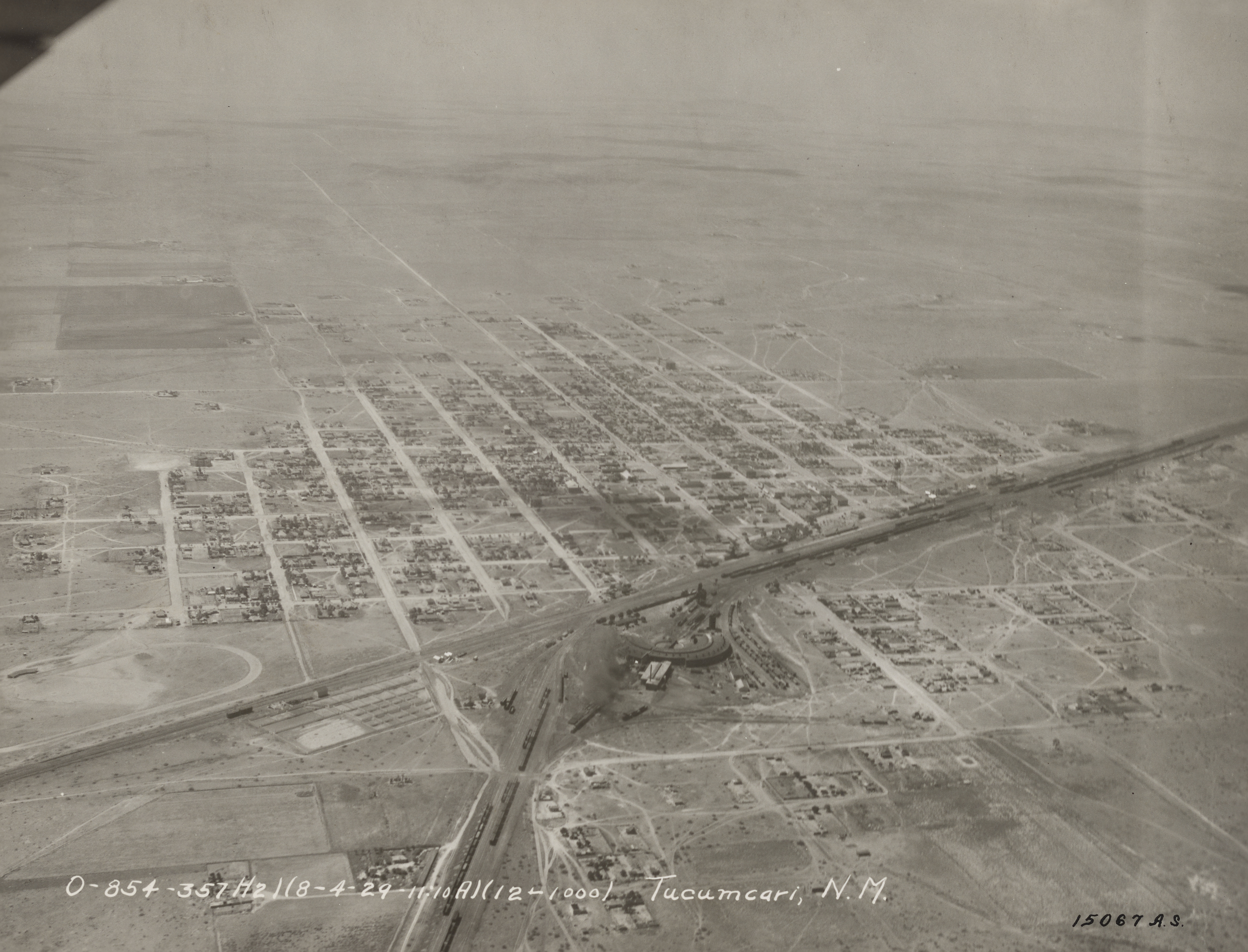
Tucumcari in 1929

In 1901, the Chicago, Rock Island and Pacific Railroad built a construction camp in the western portion of modern-day Quay County. Originally called Ragtown, the camp became known as "Six Shooter Siding", due to numerous gunfights. Its first formal name, Douglas, was used only for a short time. After it grew into a permanent settlement, it was renamed Tucumcari in 1908. The name was taken from Tucumcari Mountain, which is situated near the community. The origin of the mountain's name is uncertain; it may have been derived from the Comanche word tʉkamʉkarʉ, which means "ambush". A 1777 burial record mentions a Comanche woman and her child captured in a battle at Cuchuncari, which is believed to be an early version of the name Tucumcari. Cuchuncari, however, is from Old Comanche kuhtsunkarɨ for "buffalo sitting". A folk etymology for the town name claims that a Comanche saw a brakeman carrying a lantern and exclaimed "tukaʔ manoori!, carry the light!", which the brakeman heard as "tukama carry".

In December 1951, a water storage tank collapsed in the city. Four were killed and numerous buildings were destroyed.

In 2014, a series of suspicious fires destroyed abandoned buildings, including the Tucumcari Motel, Payless Motel, and a house in the 500 block of North Fourth Street. A former Tucumcari Police Department officer and several others were charged with arson.

The town formerly hosted an air show each year. The show held on October 4, 2006, was canceled after one hour when a single-engine plane crashed, resulting in the pilot's death.

=== Former railroad transit point ===
Tucumcari until the mid-20th century was a junction for transcontinental train service. The Rock Island Railroad ran pool train operations with the Southern Pacific (originally the El Paso and Northeastern Railway), with transfers at the station (for the Tucumcari-Los Angeles leg of the trip). The Choctaw Rocket (Memphis-Little Rock-Tucumcari-El Paso-Los Angeles) made the switch there (for the coach cars). The Golden State (Chicago-Kansas City-Topeka-Tucumcari-El Paso-Los Angeles) ran continuously through the town.

=== Cattle ranches ===
- Bell Ranch was created from a land grant in 1824 and now is one of the largest ranches in the United States.
- T4 Cattle Company was founded in 1902 and continues to be a family-run enterprise, one of the country's largest ranches.

== Geography ==
According to the United States Census Bureau, the city has a total area of 7.6 sq mi (19.6 km^{2}), of which 0.13% is covered by water.

=== Climate ===
Tucumcari has a cool, semi-arid climate (Köppen: BSk), characterized by cool winters and hot summers. Rainfall is relatively low except during the summers, when thunderstorms associated with the North American monsoon can bring locally heavy downpours. Snowfall is generally light, with an average of 14.9 inches (0.38 m). Due to the frequency of low humidity, wide daily temperature variations are normal.

The record high temperature at Tucumcari was 111 °F (44 °C) on June 11, 2022, and the record low temperature −22 °F (−30 °C) on January 13, 1963. The hottest monthly mean maximum has been 100.5 °F (38.1 °C) in July 2011 and the coldest mean minimum 12.4 °F (−10.9 °C) in January 1963, although the coldest month by mean maximum was January 1949, with a mean high of 38.6 °F or 3.7 °C.

The wettest calendar year has been 1941, with 34.94 inches (887.5 mm) and the driest, 1934, with 6.13 inches (155.7 mm). The most rainfall in one month was 11.19 inches (284.2 mm) in July 1950. The most rainfall in 24 hours was 4.41 inches (112.0 mm) on June 21, 1971. The most snowfall in one year was 51.2 inches (1.30 m), from July 1911 to June 1912. The most snowfall in one month was 30.0 inches (0.76 m), in February 1912.

Climate data for Tucumcari, New Mexico, 1991–2020 normals, extremes 1904–present
Month	Jan	Feb	Mar	Apr	May	Jun	Jul	Aug	Sep	Oct	Nov	Dec	Year
Record high °F (°C)	80 (27)	87 (31)	101 (38)	97 (36)	103 (39)	111 (44)	110 (43)	109 (43)	105 (41)	97 (36)	90 (32)	84 (29)	111 (44)
Mean maximum °F (°C)	72.1 (22.3)	76.9 (24.9)	84.4 (29.1)	89.3 (31.8)	95.8 (35.4)	103.5 (39.7)	103.8 (39.9)	101.4 (38.6)	98.0 (36.7)	90.8 (32.7)	81.1 (27.3)	73.2 (22.9)	105.7 (40.9)
Mean daily maximum °F (°C)	53.4 (11.9)	57.9 (14.4)	65.7 (18.7)	73.3 (22.9)	82.0 (27.8)	92.0 (33.3)	94.5 (34.7)	92.3 (33.5)	85.5 (29.7)	74.6 (23.7)	62.6 (17.0)	53.4 (11.9)	73.9 (23.3)
Daily mean °F (°C)	39.0 (3.9)	43.0 (6.1)	50.2 (10.1)	57.7 (14.3)	66.9 (19.4)	76.7 (24.8)	80.1 (26.7)	78.1 (25.6)	71.2 (21.8)	59.4 (15.2)	48.1 (8.9)	39.5 (4.2)	59.2 (15.1)
Mean daily minimum °F (°C)	24.7 (−4.1)	28.1 (−2.2)	34.8 (1.6)	42.2 (5.7)	51.8 (11.0)	61.4 (16.3)	65.7 (18.7)	63.9 (17.7)	56.8 (13.8)	44.3 (6.8)	33.6 (0.9)	25.6 (−3.6)	44.4 (6.9)
Mean minimum °F (°C)	9.2 (−12.7)	12.0 (−11.1)	18.2 (−7.7)	27.6 (−2.4)	37.0 (2.8)	50.4 (10.2)	58.5 (14.7)	56.8 (13.8)	43.5 (6.4)	28.1 (−2.2)	17.3 (−8.2)	8.7 (−12.9)	4.2 (−15.4)
Record low °F (°C)	−22 (−30)	−16 (−27)	−3 (−19)	14 (−10)	25 (−4)	37 (3)	52 (11)	49 (9)	30 (−1)	12 (−11)	−2 (−19)	−12 (−24)	−22 (−30)
Average precipitation inches (mm)	0.42 (11)	0.38 (9.7)	0.93 (24)	1.03 (26)	1.76 (45)	1.80 (46)	2.84 (72)	2.60 (66)	1.63 (41)	1.41 (36)	0.57 (14)	0.70 (18)	16.07 (408.7)
Average snowfall inches (cm)	3.8 (9.7)	2.1 (5.3)	1.5 (3.8)	0.4 (1.0)	0.0 (0.0)	0.0 (0.0)	0.0 (0.0)	0.0 (0.0)	0.0 (0.0)	0.8 (2.0)	2.2 (5.6)	4.1 (10)	14.9 (37.4)
Average extreme snow depth inches (cm)	3.7 (9.4)	1.9 (4.8)	1.8 (4.6)	0.8 (2.0)	0.0 (0.0)	0.0 (0.0)	0.0 (0.0)	0.0 (0.0)	0.0 (0.0)	0.4 (1.0)	1.9 (4.8)	3.6 (9.1)	5.8 (15)
Average precipitation days (≥ 0.01 in)	2.7	3.0	3.9	4.7	5.9	6.4	8.9	9.4	5.6	5.8	3.3	3.9	63.5
Average snowy days (≥ 0.1 in)	1.6	1.4	1.0	0.3	0.0	0.0	0.0	0.0	0.0	0.3	1.2	2.2	8.0
Source 1: NOAA
Source 2: National Weather Service

== Demographics ==
Historical population
Census	Pop.	Note	%±
1910	2,526		—
1920	3,117		23.4%
1930	4,143		32.9%
1940	6,194		49.5%
1950	8,419		35.9%
1960	8,143		−3.3%
1970	7,189		−11.7%
1980	6,765		−5.9%
1990	6,831		1.0%
2000	5,989		−12.3%
2010	5,363		−10.5%
2020	5,278		−1.6%
U.S. Decennial Census

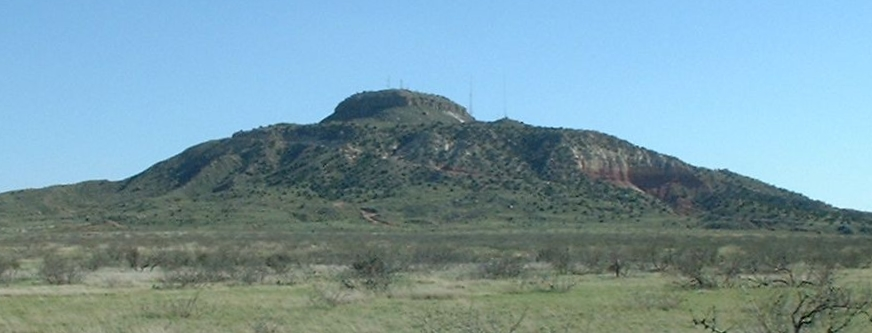
Tucumcari Mountain, 2007

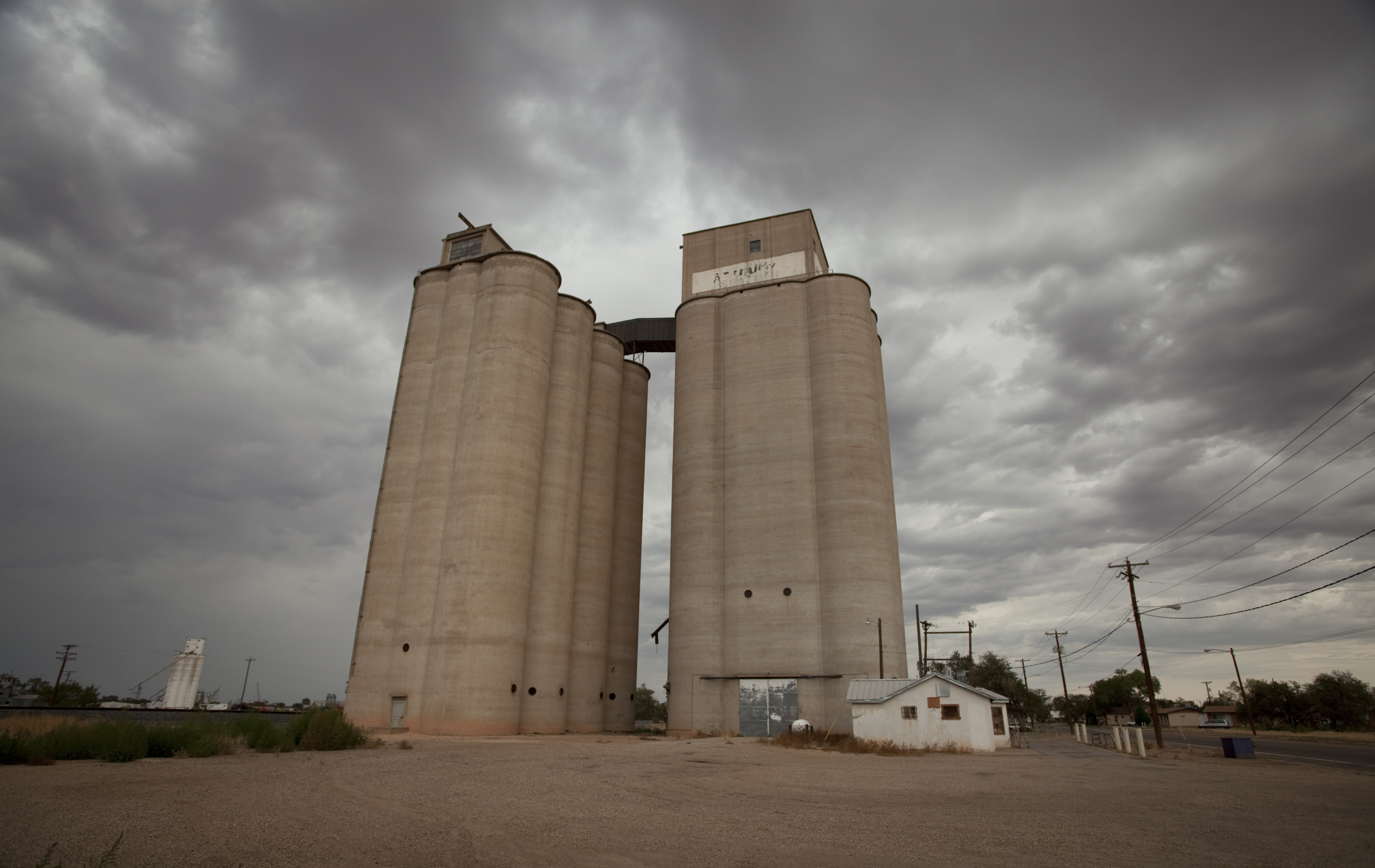
Attebury Grain Elevator, 2011

=== 2020 census ===
As of the 2020 census, Tucumcari had a population of 5,278. The median age was 41.2 years. 24.6% of residents were under the age of 18 and 21.8% of residents were 65 years of age or older. For every 100 females there were 91.6 males, and for every 100 females age 18 and over there were 87.7 males age 18 and over.

97.7% of residents lived in urban areas, while 2.3% lived in rural areas.

There were 2,304 households in Tucumcari, of which 28.2% had children under the age of 18 living in them. Of all households, 32.0% were married-couple households, 23.3% were households with a male householder and no spouse or partner present, and 36.6% were households with a female householder and no spouse or partner present. About 37.2% of all households were made up of individuals and 18.0% had someone living alone who was 65 years of age or older.

There were 2,895 housing units, of which 20.4% were vacant. The homeowner vacancy rate was 2.5% and the rental vacancy rate was 13.6%.

Racial composition as of the 2020 census
Race	Number	Percentage
White	3,358	63.6%
Black or African American	94	1.8%
American Indian and Alaska Native	104	2.0%
Asian	41	0.8%
Native Hawaiian and Other Pacific Islander	6	0.1%
Some other race	768	14.6%
Two or more races	907	17.2%
Hispanic or Latino (of any race)	3,035	57.5%

=== 2000 census ===
As of the 2000 census, 5,989 people, 2,489 households, and 1,607 families were residing in the city. The population density was 793.8 inhabitants per square mile (306.5/km^{2}). The 3,065 housing units had an average density of 406.2 per square mile (156.8/km^{2}). The racial makeup of the city was 75.87% White, 1.29% African American, 1.39% Native American, 1.20% Asian, 0.22% Pacific Islander, 17.10% from other races, and 2.94% from two or more races. Hispanics or Latinos of any race were 51.41% of the population.

Of the 2,489 households, 29.8% had children under 18 living with them, 45.4% were married couples living together, 15.3% had a female householder with no husband present, and 35.4% were not families. About 31.7% of all households were made up of individuals, and 14.7% had someone living alone who was 65 or older. The average household size was 2.35 and the average family size was 2.93.

In the city, the age distribution was 26.0% under 18, 7.5% from 18 to 24, 24.2% from 25 to 44, 24.8% from 45 to 64, and 17.5% who were 65 or older. The median age was 39 years. For every 100 females, there were 90.9 males. For every 100 females 18 and over, there were 86.8 males.

The median income for a household in the city was $22,560 and for a family was $27,468. Males had a median income of $25,342 versus $18,568 for females. The per capita income for the city was $14,786. About 19.1% of families and 24.8% of the population were below the poverty line, including 29.5% of those under 18 and 16.7% of those 65 or over.

== Arts and culture ==
The buildings formerly at Metropolitan Park (locally known as "Five Mile Park" because it is located about five miles (8 km) outside of town) were designed by Trent Thomas, adapted from his design of La Fonda Hotel in Santa Fe. The park once featured New Mexico's largest outdoor swimming pool. Owing to deterioration, Metropolitan Park was named to the New Mexico Heritage Preservation Alliance's list of Most Endangered for 2003. In 2010, the park's main building caught fire and burnt to the ground. The city of Tucumcari razed the site weeks after the fire. Art City sculpture park can be found a few miles north of the city.

=== Tucumcari Tonite, Route 66, and tourism ===
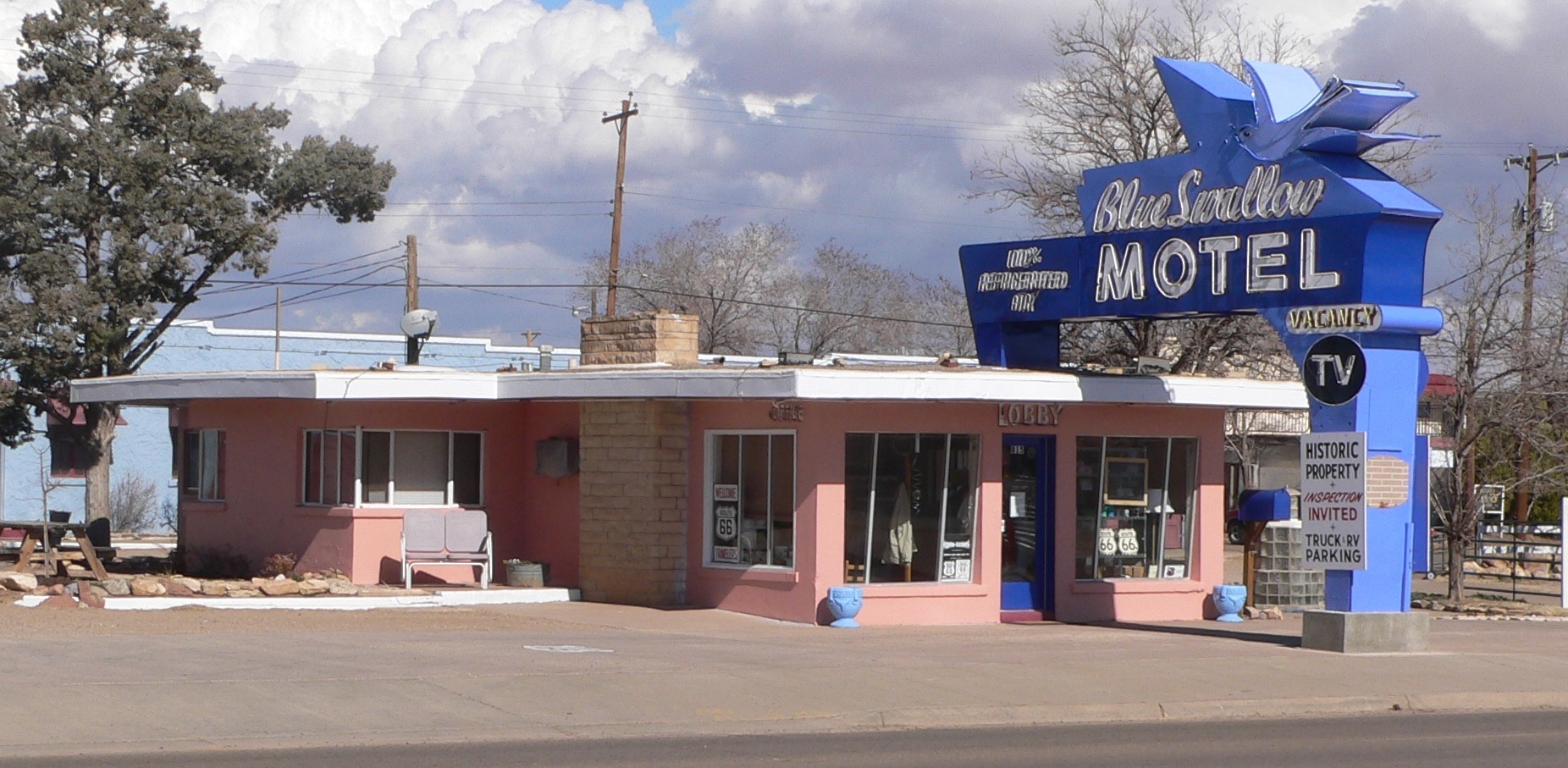
Blue Swallow Motel, 2012

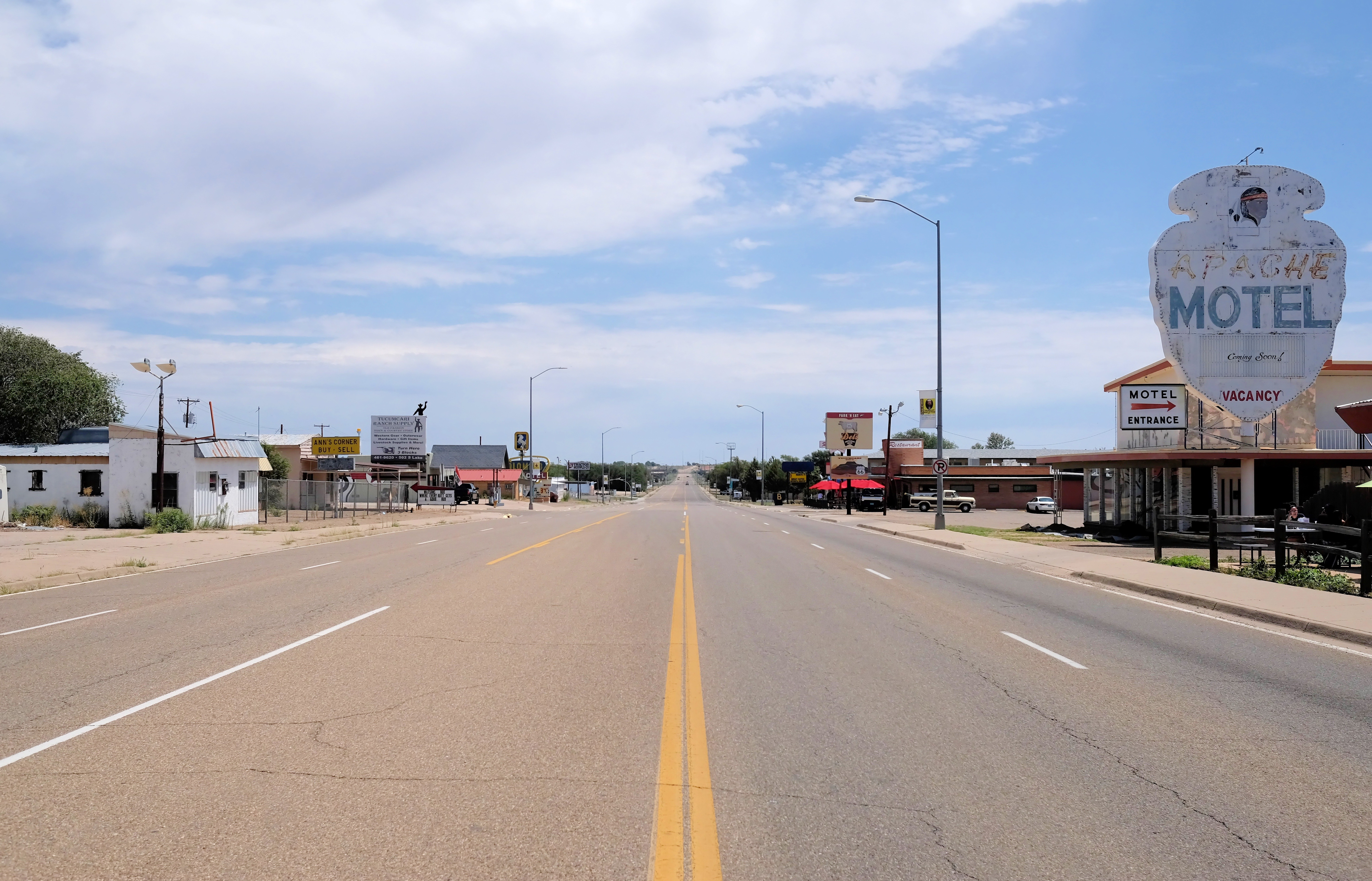
Route 66 in Tucumcari, 2020

For many years, Tucumcari has been a popular stop for cross-country travelers on Interstate 40 (formerly U.S. Route 66 in the area). It is the largest city on the highway between Amarillo, Texas, and Albuquerque, New Mexico. Billboards reading "TUCUMCARI TONITE!" [sic] placed along I-40 for many miles to the east and west of the town invite motorists to stay the night in one of Tucumcari's "2000" (later changed to "1200") motel rooms. The "TUCUMCARI TONITE!" [sic] campaign was abandoned in favor of a campaign that declared Tucumcari, "Gateway to the West". However, on June 24, 2008, Tucumcari's Lodgers Tax Advisory Board, the group responsible for the billboards, voted to return to the previous slogan.

Old U.S. Route 66 runs through the heart of Tucumcari via Route 66 Boulevard, which was previously known as Tucumcari Boulevard from 1970 to 2003 and as Gaynell Avenue before that time. Numerous businesses, including gasoline service stations, restaurants, and motels, were constructed to accommodate tourists as they traveled through on the Mother Road. A large number of the vintage motels and restaurants built in the 1930s, 1940s, and 1950s are still in business despite intense competition from newer chain motels and restaurants in the vicinity of Interstate 40, which passes through the city's outskirts on the south.

Tucumcari is the home of over 50 murals. Most were painted by artists Doug and Sharon Quarles and serve as tourist attractions.

=== Downtown ===
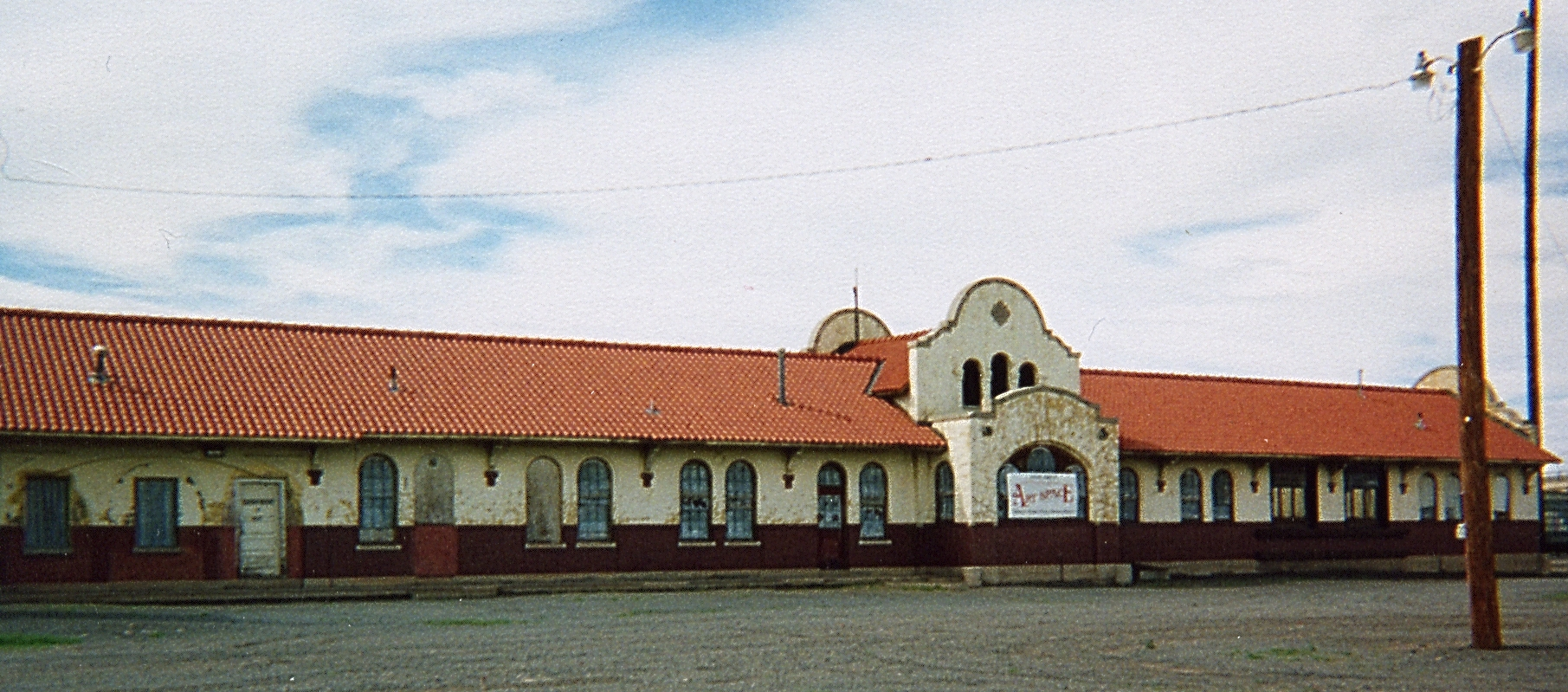
Train station, 2008

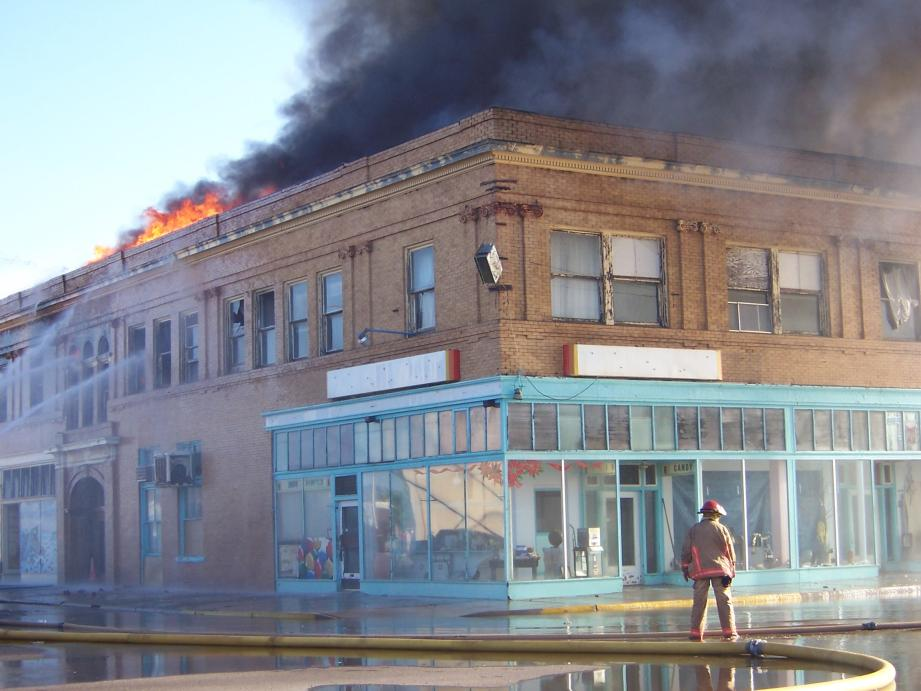
The Federal Building (Sands-Dorsey Drug) burned on June 8, 2007.

Most of Tucumcari's oldest buildings lie along or near Main Street in the historic downtown area. These include:

- Rock Island-Southern Pacific Train Station (built 1926, restored 2011)
- Odeon Theatre (built 1937, still operating)
- Crescent Creamery (vacant)
- Masonic Temple (still operating)
- Princess Theater (under renovation)

Also located in the downtown area are the concrete arches that once surrounded the Hotel Vorenburg, which was demolished in the 1970s after being damaged by fire. The Federal Building, commonly known as Sands-Dorsey Drug, was damaged by two fires before finally being demolished in 2015. The location is now a park.

== Education ==
Public education in the city is part of the Tucumcari Public Schools district, including:

- Tucumcari Elementary School (public prekindergarten through fifth grade)
- Tucumcari Middle School (public sixth through eighth grades)
- Tucumcari High School (public 9th through 12th grades)

Tertiary schools:

- Mesalands Community College (community two-year institution of higher learning)

== Notable people ==
- Paul Brinegar (1917–1995), character actor; born in Tucumcari.
- Abel Cullum (born 1987), former King of the Cage flyweight champion
- Stan David (born 1962), Texas Tech and professional football player (NFL's Buffalo Bills)
- Rex Maddaford (born 1947), Olympic running athlete, competed for the New Zealand team in the 1968 Summer Olympics; Tucumcari Public Schools faculty member
- Bob Scobey (1916–1963), musician; born in Tucumcari

== In popular culture ==
- Many of the scenes in the television show Rawhide (1959–1966) starring Clint Eastwood were shot in the Tucumcari area. Paul Brinegar, who played Wishbone, was from Tucumcari.
- Scenes for the film Hell or High Water were filmed in Tucumcari on June 1, 2015.

== See also ==
- National Register of Historic Places listings in Quay County, New Mexico
  - Baca–Goodman House (former listing)
  - Blue Swallow Motel
  - Cactus Motor Lodge (structure no longer exists)
