= National Register of Historic Places listings in Guadalupe County, New Mexico =

Location of Guadalupe County in New Mexico

This is a list of the National Register of Historic Places listings in Guadalupe County, New Mexico.

This is intended to be a complete list of the properties and districts on the National Register of Historic Places in Guadalupe County, New Mexico, United States. Latitude and longitude coordinates are provided for many National Register properties and districts; these locations may be seen together in a map.

There are 10 properties and 3 districts listed on the National Register in the county. All of the places within the county on the National Register are also listed on the State Register of Cultural Properties.

This National Park Service list is complete through NPS recent listings posted May 1, 2026.

Contents: NRHP in New Mexico by county
Bernalillo – Catron – Chaves – Cibola – Colfax – Curry – De Baca – Doña Ana – Eddy – Grant – Guadalupe – Harding – Hidalgo – Lea – Lincoln – Los Alamos – Luna – McKinley – Mora – Otero – Quay – Rio Arriba – Roosevelt – San Juan – San Miguel – Sandoval – Santa Fe – Sierra – Socorro – Taos – Torrance – Union – Valencia

== Current listings ==
	Name on the Register	Image	Date listed	Location	City or town	Description
1	Abandoned Route 66-Cuervo to NM 156		November 22, 1993 (#93001206)	Cuervo southwest to the junction with State Road 156; 35°00′14″N 104°26′17″W	Cuervo	
2	Anton Chico de Abajo Historic District		September 29, 1986 (#86002334)	Address Restricted	Anton Chico	
3	Jesus M. Casaus House	Jesus M. Casaus House	April 1, 1982 (#82003324)	628 3rd St. 34°56′09″N 104°40′52″W	Santa Rosa	
4	Colonias de San Jose Historic District		September 29, 1986 (#86002331)	Address Restricted	Colonias	
5	Alexander Grzelachowski House and Store	Alexander Grzelachowski House and Store	June 24, 1993 (#93000570)	Southwest of the junction of State Roads 91 and 203; 34°49′50″N 104°37′26″W	Puerto De Luna	
6	Guadalupe County Courthouse in Santa Rosa	Guadalupe County Courthouse in Santa Rosa	December 7, 1987 (#87000890)	Northwestern corner of S. 4th St. and Parker Ave. 34°56′29″N 104°41′11″W	Santa Rosa	
7	La Placita De Abajo District		September 29, 1986 (#86002338)	Address Restricted	Colonias	
8	J. Julian Moise House	J. Julian Moise House	December 27, 1984 (#84000633)	400 Capitan; 34°56′20″N 104°41′03″W	Santa Rosa	1904-built brick and wood frame house with some elements of Colonial Revival style.
9	Park Lake Historic District	Park Lake Historic District	March 15, 1996 (#96000267)	Junction of Will Rogers Dr. and Lake Dr. 34°56′28″N 104°40′40″W	Santa Rosa	
10	Route 66, State maintained from Montoya to Cuervo	Route 66, State maintained from Montoya to Cuervo	November 19, 1997 (#97001395)	Along former U.S. Route 66 from west of Montoya to Cuervo; 35°03′41″N 104°16′01″W	Cuervo	

== See also ==
- List of National Historic Landmarks in New Mexico
- National Register of Historic Places listings in New Mexico
