= U.S. Route 84 in New Mexico =

Segment of American highway

U.S. Highway 84
- US 84 highlighted in red

Route information
- Maintained by NMDOT
- Length: 288.864 mi (464.882 km)
- Existed: 1936–present

Major junctions
- North end: US 84 at the Colorado state line near Dulce
- US 64 from west of Chama to Tierra Amarilla; US 285 from Chili to Eldorado at Santa Fe; I-25 / US 85 from Santa Fe to south of Las Vegas; I-40 / NM 219 north of Pastura; I-40 / US 54 in Santa Rosa; US 60 from Fort Sumner to Texico; US 70 in Clovis
- East end: US 70 / US 84 at the Texas state line in Texico

Location
- Country: United States
- State: New Mexico
- Counties: Rio Arriba, Santa Fe, San Miguel, Guadalupe, De Baca, Roosevelt, Curry

Highway system
- United States Numbered Highway System; List; Special; Divided; New Mexico State Highway System; Interstate; US; State; Scenic
← NM 83	→ US 85

U.S. Route 84 (US 84) is a part of the U.S. Highway System that travels from Pagosa Springs, CO to Midway, GA. In New Mexico it begins at the Colorado state line northwest of Chama and ends at the Texas state line in Texico.

== Route description ==
US 84 enters New Mexico at Rio Arriba County 28 miles (45 km) south of its terminus at US 160. About six miles (9.7 km) south of the Colorado–New Mexico state line, US 64 comes from the west and travels concurrently with US 84 for the next 28 miles (45 km). Only three miles (4.8 km) east of this intersection, the concurrency crosses the Continental Divide at Sargent Pass, elevation 7,718 feet (2,352 m) above sea level or more than 3,100 feet (940 m) lower than Wolf Creek Pass, the next Continental Divide highway pass to the north. Therefore, only 37 miles (60 km) of US 84 is located west of the Continental Divide. About 12 miles (19 km) east of the intersection, US 64/US 84 enters the town of Chama. At a T-intersection, New Mexico State Road 17 enters from the north and terminates at said intersection, while US 64/US 84 enter from the south and west.

After heading south from Chama, US 64/US 84 combine for about 14 miles (23 km) to Tierra Amarilla, where US 64 departs from US 84 and heads southeast, while US 84 continues south. About 57 miles (92 km) down the road, US 84 is joined by US 285 south of the small community of Chili. About five miles (8.0 km) further, US 84/US 285 enter the city of Española from the north as North Paseo de Onate Street. At the south end of the town, US 84/US 285 becomes the Santa Fe Highway and a four-lane expressway. And about nine miles (14 km) further, US 84/US 285 becomes a limited-access freeway. 15 miles (24 km) further south, the two return to surface street status and then travel past downtown Santa Fe via St. Francis Drive. On the south side of Santa Fe at Interstate 25's exit 282A, US 84/US 285 merge with northbound I-25/US 85. All four highways head east and slightly to the south to avoid the Sangre de Cristo Mountains. Just before turning north, US 285 exits the interstate at exit 290 and continues south towards Clines Corners. After winding north and south, the interstate finally begins heading solely north, and US 84 exits about 55 miles (89 km) later at exit 339 near Romeroville and travels in an east/southeastern direction, while I-25/US 85 continue north to Colorado. Following a path southeast and then south for 42 miles (68 km), US 84 merges with I-40 (and Historic US 66) at I-40's exit 256. After 17 miles (27 km) I-40/US 84 enter Santa Rosa. About 21 miles (34 km) from its concurrency with I-40, US 84 diverges at exit 277.

The highway then travels south/southeast for 42 miles (68 km) until merging with US 60 in downtown Fort Sumner. From the intersection with US 60, US 60/US 84 travel east, passing through Taiban and Melrose before intersecting US 70 after 61 miles (98 km) in Clovis. From the intersection with US 70, US 64/US 70/US 84 travels east 8.7 miles (14.0 km) entering Texico. Here, about 280 feet (85 m) before the Texas–New Mexico state line, US 60 splits from US 70/US 84 with US 70/US 84 continuing east into Farwell, Texas. Despite being a west-east route, US-84 is signed as north-south between Fort Sumner and the Colorado border.

== History ==
US 84 was first extended west into New Mexico in 1936 at Texico. In 1937, the route was extended further to Santa Fe, and in 1938, the route was extended further to Cortez, Colorado. However, this extension did not last long, because the highway was truncated back to Santa Fe. The current route for US 84 was created in 1941.

== Junction list ==
US 84 is signed as a north-south highway between Fort Sumner and the Colorado state line.

County	Location	mi	km	Exit	Destinations	Notes
Rio Arriba					US 84 north – Pagosa Springs	Continuation into Colorado
Rio Arriba					US 64 west – Navajo City, Bloomfield, Farmington	Northern end of US 64 overlap
Rio Arriba	See US 64					
Rio Arriba	Tierra Amarilla				US 64 east – Tres Piedras, Taos	Southern end of US 64 overlap
Rio Arriba	Tierra Amarilla				NM 162 north	Southern terminus of NM 162
Rio Arriba	Cebolla				NM 221 south	Northern terminus of NM 221
Rio Arriba					NM 115 east – Canjilon	Western terminus of NM 115
Rio Arriba	Abiquiu				NM 96 south – Youngsville, Coyote	Northern terminus of NM 96
Rio Arriba	Abiquiu				NM 554 east – El Rito	Western terminus of NM 554
Rio Arriba					NM 233 east – Medanales	Western terminus of NM 233
Rio Arriba	Chili				US 285 north – Ojo Caliente	Northern end of US 285 overlap
Rio Arriba	El Duende				NM 74 south	Northern terminus of NM 74
Rio Arriba	Española				NM 584 east (Fairview Lane)	Western terminus of NM 584
Rio Arriba	Española				NM 30 south – San Ildefonso Pueblo	Northern terminus of NM 30
Rio Arriba	Española				NM 369 east	Western terminus of NM 369
Rio Arriba	Española				NM 68 north – La Villita, Los Luceros, Taos	Southern terminus of NM 68
Rio Arriba	Española				NM 369 west	Eastern terminus of NM 369
Santa Fe	Española–Sombrillo line				NM 399 south / NM 106 north – Sombrillo	Northern terminus of NM 399; southern terminus of NM 106
Santa Fe				183	Frontage Road	Interchange
Santa Fe	Pojoaque				NM 503 north – Cundiyo	Southern terminus of NM 503
Santa Fe	Pojoaque				NM 502 west – San Ildefonso Pueblo	Eastern terminus of NM 502; interchange
Santa Fe	Cuyamungue			177	To CR 89B / CR 89D / Buffalo Thunder Road	Northern end of freeway
Santa Fe	Cuyamungue			176	Cuyamungue	
Santa Fe				175	Camel Rock Road	
Santa Fe	Tesuque Pueblo			172	CR 73 south – Tesuque	Northern terminus of CR 73
Santa Fe	Tesuque Pueblo–Tesuque line			171	Flea Market Road	
Santa Fe	Tesuque–Santa Fe line			168	CR 73 north / Opera Drive / Avenida Monte Sereno – Tesuque Village	Southern terminus of CR 73
Santa Fe	Santa Fe			166	NM 599 south (Santa Fe Relief Route)	Northern terminus of NM 599; southern end of freeway
Santa Fe	Santa Fe				To NM 475 / via Guadalupe Street	Interchange; southbound exit and northbound entrance
Santa Fe	Santa Fe				NM 14 south (Cerrillos Road)	Northern terminus of NM 14
Santa Fe	Santa Fe				NM 466 (St. Michaels Drive) – Santa Fe University of Art and Design	Interchange; serves CHRISTUS St. Vincent Regional Medical Center
Santa Fe	Santa Fe			282	I-25 south (US 85 south) – Albuquerque	Northern end of I-25/US 85 overlap
See I-25
San Miguel		103.64– 103.72	166.79– 166.92	339	I-25 north (US 85 north) – Las Vegas	Southern end of I-25/US 85 overlap
San Miguel		83.42	134.25		NM 386 west – Tecolotito	Eastern terminus of NM 386
San Miguel		82.11	132.14		NM 451 south – Anton Chico	Northern terminus of NM 451
Guadalupe	Dilia	78.00	125.53		NM 119 west – Anton Chico	Eastern terminus of NM 119
Guadalupe	Vegas Junction	62.27– 62.36	100.21– 100.36	256	I-40 / NM 219 south – Albuquerque, Pastura	Northern end of I-40 overlap; northern terminus of NM 219
Guadalupe	See I-40					
Guadalupe	Santa Rosa	41.72– 41.81	67.14– 67.29	277	I-40 BL west / I-40 east / US 54 – Tucumcari	Southern end of I-40 overlap
Guadalupe	Santa Rosa	41.67	67.06		NM 156 east	Western terminus of NM 156
De Baca		9.95	16.01		NM 203 west – Lake Sumner, Sumner Lake State Park	Western terminus of NM 203
De Baca	Fort Sumner	0.0– 327.58	0.0– 527.19		US 60 west – Vaughn	Northern end of US 60 overlap; direction signage changes from north-south to east-west; mileposts follow US 60
De Baca	Taiban	341.23	549.16		NM 294 south	Northern terminus of NM 294
De Baca	Taiban	342.06	550.49		NM 252 north – House, McAlister	Southern terminus of NM 252
Roosevelt	No major junctions					
Curry	Melrose	363.46	584.93		NM 268 north	Southern terminus of NM 268
Curry	Melrose	364.45	586.53		NM 267 south – Floyd, Portales	Northern terminus of NM 267
Curry		368.46	592.98		NM 224 north	Southern terminus of NM 224
Curry	Clovis	381.46	613.90		NM 311 west – Cannon Air Force Base	Eastern terminus of NM 311; partial interchange
Curry	Clovis	384.47	618.74		NM 467 south – Portales	Northern terminus of NM 467
Curry	Clovis	388.63	625.44		US 70 west / NM 209 north – Portales, Broadview, Grady	Western end of US 70 overlap; southern terminus of NM 209
Curry	Texico	396.99	638.89		NM 108 north (North College Street)	Southern terminus of NM 108
Curry	Texico	397.25	639.31		NM 348 south (South Garwood Street) – Farwell	Northern terminus of NM 348
Curry	Texico	397.38– 448.19	639.52– 721.29		US 60 east – Amarillo	Eastern end of US 60 overlap; mileposts follow US 70
Curry	Texico	448.25	721.39		US 70 east / US 84 east – Farwell	Continuation into Texas
1.000 mi = 1.609 km; 1.000 km = 0.621 mi: Concurrency terminus; Incomplete access

U.S. Route 84
Previous state: Colorado	New Mexico	Next state: Texas
