= New Mexico State Road 119 =

State highway in New Mexico, United States

State Road 119
- NM 119 highlighted in red

Route information
- Maintained by NMDOT
- Length: 5.647 mi (9.088 km)

Major junctions
- West end: NM 386 in Anton Chico
- NM 451 near Anton Chico
- East end: US 84 in Dilia

Location
- Country: United States
- State: New Mexico
- Counties: Guadalupe

Highway system
- New Mexico State Highway System; Interstate; US; State; Scenic
| ← NM 118 | → NM 120 |

State Road 119 (NM 119) is a 5.647-mile-long (9.088 km) state highway in the U.S. state of New Mexico, entirely within western Guadalupe County. NM 119's western terminus is at NM 386 in Anton Chico, and the eastern terminus is at U.S. Route 84 (US 84) in Dilia. It is a two–lane road for its entire length.

== Route description ==
Beginning in Dilia at the intersection with US 84, mile marker 78, the road heads west past Upper Dilia to the south. At the two mile (3 km) point it passes Llano Del Medio, to the south, at which point the road heads northwest. At milepost 3, there is a road to the south to Llano Veijo which is about a mile away. At about milepost 3.5 the road makes a 90 degree turn to the left, heading southwest, and shortly thereafter is the intersection with NM 451 from the north. After NM 451 the road crosses the Pecos River. The speed limit is 55 mph (89 km/h) from mile marker 0 until mile marker 4.

Right after the river crossing, at mile post 4, the speed limit reduces to 40 mph (64 km/h). NM 119 enters Anton Chico at the south end of town at a traffic triangle where it terminates at the intersection with NM 386 (mile marker 9) from Tecolotito (San Miguel County). NM 119 formerly turned sharply north at the traffic triangle to pass through Anton Chico and dead end at the Pecos River; a bridge used to cross the Pecos at that point, too.

== Major junctions ==
The entire route is in Guadalupe County.

| Location | mi | km | Destinations | Notes |
|---|---|---|---|---|
| Anton Chico | 0.000 | 0.000 | NM 386 – Tecolotito | Western terminus |
| | 1.447 | 2.329 | NM 451 north | Southern terminus of NM 451 |
| Dilia | 5.647 | 9.088 | US 84 – Santa Rosa, Las Vegas | Eastern terminus |
1.000 mi = 1.609 km; 1.000 km = 0.621 mi
