= Guadalupe County Courthouse =

Guadalupe County Courthouse may refer to:

- Guadalupe County Courthouse in Santa Rosa, Santa Rosa, New Mexico, a former courthouse listed on the National Register of Historic Places
- Guadalupe County Courthouse in Puerto de Luna, New Mexico, which preceded the Santa Rosa one
- Guadalupe County Courthouse (New Mexico), Santa Rosa, New Mexico, a current courthouse of the Fourth Judicial Court
- Guadalupe County Courthouse (Texas), Seguin, Texas
