= New Mexico State Road 203 =

State highway in New Mexico, United States

State Road 203
- NM 203 highlighted in red

Route information
- Maintained by NMDOT
- Length: 10.3 mi (16.6 km)

Major junctions
- West end: CR 3CC at the De Baca/ Guadalupe county line near Lake Sumner
- East end: US 84 near Fort Sumner

Location
- Country: United States
- State: New Mexico
- Counties: De Baca

Highway system
- New Mexico State Highway System; Interstate; US; State; Scenic
← NM 202	→ NM 204

State Road 203 (NM 203) is a 10.3-mile-long (16.6 km) state highway in the US state of New Mexico. NM 203's western terminus is at County Route 3 (CR 3) at the De Baca/ Guadalupe county line west-northwest of Lake Sumner, and the eastern terminus is at U.S. Route 84 (US 84) north of Fort Sumner.

== Major intersections ==
The entire route is in De Baca County.

Location	mi	km	Destinations	Notes
	0.000	0.000	CR 3CC	Continuation into Guadalupe County beyond western terminus
	10.300	16.576	US 84 – Santa Rosa, Ft. Sumner	Eastern terminus
1.000 mi = 1.609 km; 1.000 km = 0.621 mi
