= Lake Sumner, New Mexico =

Census-designated place in De Baca County, New Mexico, United States

- Census-designated place
- Location of Lake Sumner, New Mexico

- Location in the United States
- Coordinates: 34°37′07″N 104°22′48″W
- Country: United States
- State: New Mexico
- County: De Baca

Area
  - Total: 68.53 sq mi (177.48 km^{2})
  - Land: 62.27 sq mi (161.28 km^{2})
  - Water: 6.25 sq mi (16.20 km^{2})
- Elevation: 4,252 ft (1,296 m)

Population (2020)
  - Total: 72
  - Density: 1.2/sq mi (0.45/km^{2})
- Time zone: UTC-7 (Mountain (MST))
  - Summer (DST): UTC-6 (MDT)
- ZIP code: 88119
- Area code: 575
- FIPS code: 35-37875
- GNIS feature ID: 2408553

Lake Sumner is a census-designated place (CDP) in De Baca County, New Mexico, United States. As of the 2020 census, Lake Sumner had a population of 72.

== Geography ==
Lake Sumner is located in northern De Baca County and surrounds Lake Sumner, a reservoir formed by Sumner Dam on the Pecos River. Sumner Lake State Park occupies the east and west sides of the lake at its south end, near the outlet. U.S. Route 84 forms the northeastern edge of the CDP; the highway leads southeast 10 miles (16 km) to Fort Sumner, the De Baca County seat, and northwest 34 miles (55 km) to Santa Rosa.

According to the United States Census Bureau, the CDP has a total area of 68.5 square miles (177.3 km^{2}), of which 62.2 square miles (161.0 km^{2}) is land and 6.3 square miles (16.3 km^{2}), or 9.17%, is water.

=== Climate ===
According to the Köppen Climate Classification system, Lake Sumner has a cold semi-arid climate, abbreviated "BSk" on climate maps. The hottest temperature recorded at Lake Sumner was 112 °F (44.4 °C) on June 12, 2022, while the coldest temperature recorded was −24 °F (−31.1 °C) on January 13, 1963.

Climate data for Lake Sumner, New Mexico, 1991–2020 normals, extremes 1948–present
Month	Jan	Feb	Mar	Apr	May	Jun	Jul	Aug	Sep	Oct	Nov	Dec	Year
Record high °F (°C)	79 (26)	85 (29)	92 (33)	96 (36)	104 (40)	112 (44)	111 (44)	110 (43)	102 (39)	96 (36)	88 (31)	81 (27)	112 (44)
Mean maximum °F (°C)	70.7 (21.5)	75.5 (24.2)	82.7 (28.2)	88.7 (31.5)	96.3 (35.7)	103.4 (39.7)	103.4 (39.7)	100.7 (38.2)	96.8 (36.0)	90.1 (32.3)	79.8 (26.6)	72.3 (22.4)	105.2 (40.7)
Mean daily maximum °F (°C)	55.1 (12.8)	59.7 (15.4)	67.5 (19.7)	75.2 (24.0)	84.6 (29.2)	94.2 (34.6)	95.5 (35.3)	93.4 (34.1)	86.4 (30.2)	76.0 (24.4)	64.5 (18.1)	55.2 (12.9)	75.6 (24.2)
Daily mean °F (°C)	39.6 (4.2)	43.6 (6.4)	50.8 (10.4)	58.2 (14.6)	68.0 (20.0)	77.6 (25.3)	80.3 (26.8)	78.5 (25.8)	71.2 (21.8)	59.9 (15.5)	48.4 (9.1)	40.1 (4.5)	59.7 (15.4)
Mean daily minimum °F (°C)	24.0 (−4.4)	27.5 (−2.5)	34.1 (1.2)	41.2 (5.1)	51.4 (10.8)	61.0 (16.1)	65.2 (18.4)	63.5 (17.5)	56.0 (13.3)	43.7 (6.5)	32.3 (0.2)	25.0 (−3.9)	43.7 (6.5)
Mean minimum °F (°C)	9.7 (−12.4)	12.8 (−10.7)	17.8 (−7.9)	27.2 (−2.7)	36.9 (2.7)	51.3 (10.7)	58.1 (14.5)	56.2 (13.4)	43.3 (6.3)	29.1 (−1.6)	16.6 (−8.6)	9.3 (−12.6)	5.4 (−14.8)
Record low °F (°C)	−24 (−31)	−15 (−26)	3 (−16)	14 (−10)	25 (−4)	41 (5)	51 (11)	43 (6)	31 (−1)	10 (−12)	−3 (−19)	−12 (−24)	−24 (−31)
Average precipitation inches (mm)	0.35 (8.9)	0.39 (9.9)	0.61 (15)	0.81 (21)	1.16 (29)	1.51 (38)	2.47 (63)	2.23 (57)	1.90 (48)	1.51 (38)	0.49 (12)	0.61 (15)	14.04 (354.8)
Average snowfall inches (cm)	2.4 (6.1)	1.7 (4.3)	0.7 (1.8)	0.3 (0.76)	0.0 (0.0)	0.0 (0.0)	0.0 (0.0)	0.0 (0.0)	0.0 (0.0)	0.3 (0.76)	0.7 (1.8)	3.4 (8.6)	9.5 (24.12)
Average extreme snow depth inches (cm)	1.9 (4.8)	1.0 (2.5)	0.4 (1.0)	0.2 (0.51)	0.0 (0.0)	0.0 (0.0)	0.0 (0.0)	0.0 (0.0)	0.0 (0.0)	0.1 (0.25)	0.6 (1.5)	2.1 (5.3)	3.3 (8.4)
Average precipitation days (≥ 0.01 in)	2.4	2.4	3.1	3.3	4.2	5.6	7.2	8.0	5.7	4.6	2.4	2.9	51.8
Average snowy days (≥ 0.1 in)	1.0	1.2	0.5	0.1	0.0	0.0	0.0	0.0	0.0	0.1	0.6	1.5	5.0
Source 1: NOAA
Source 2: National Weather Service

== Demographics ==
Historical population
Census	Pop.	Note	%±
2000	86		—
2010	143		66.3%
2020	72		−49.7%
U.S. Decennial Census

As of the census of 2000, there were 86 people, 44 households, and 27 families residing in the CDP. The population density was 1.4 inhabitants per square mile (0.54/km^{2}). There were 188 housing units at an average density of 3.0 per square mile (1.2/km^{2}). The racial makeup of the CDP was 90.70% White, 1.16% Asian, 3.49% from other races, and 4.65% from two or more races. Hispanic or Latino of any race were 17.44% of the population.

There were 44 households, out of which 18.2% had children under the age of 18 living with them, 61.4% were married couples living together, and 38.6% were non-families. 34.1% of all households were made up of individuals, and 13.6% had someone living alone who was 65 years of age or older. The average household size was 1.95 and the average family size was 2.48.

In the CDP, the population was spread out, with 14.0% under the age of 18, 4.7% from 18 to 24, 17.4% from 25 to 44, 33.7% from 45 to 64, and 30.2% who were 65 years of age or older. The median age was 52 years. For every 100 females, there were 120.5 males. For every 100 females age 18 and over, there were 111.4 males.

The median income for a household in the CDP was $25,250, and the median income for a family was $29,167. Males had a median income of $28,750 versus $23,750 for females. The per capita income for the CDP was $17,590. There were no families and 10.5% of the population living below the poverty line, including no under eighteens and 45.5% of those over 64.

== Education ==
Fort Sumner Municipal Schools is the school district of all of De Baca County.

== See also ==
- List of census-designated places in New Mexico
