= Guadalupe County Courthouse in Santa Rosa =

- U.S. National Register of Historic Places
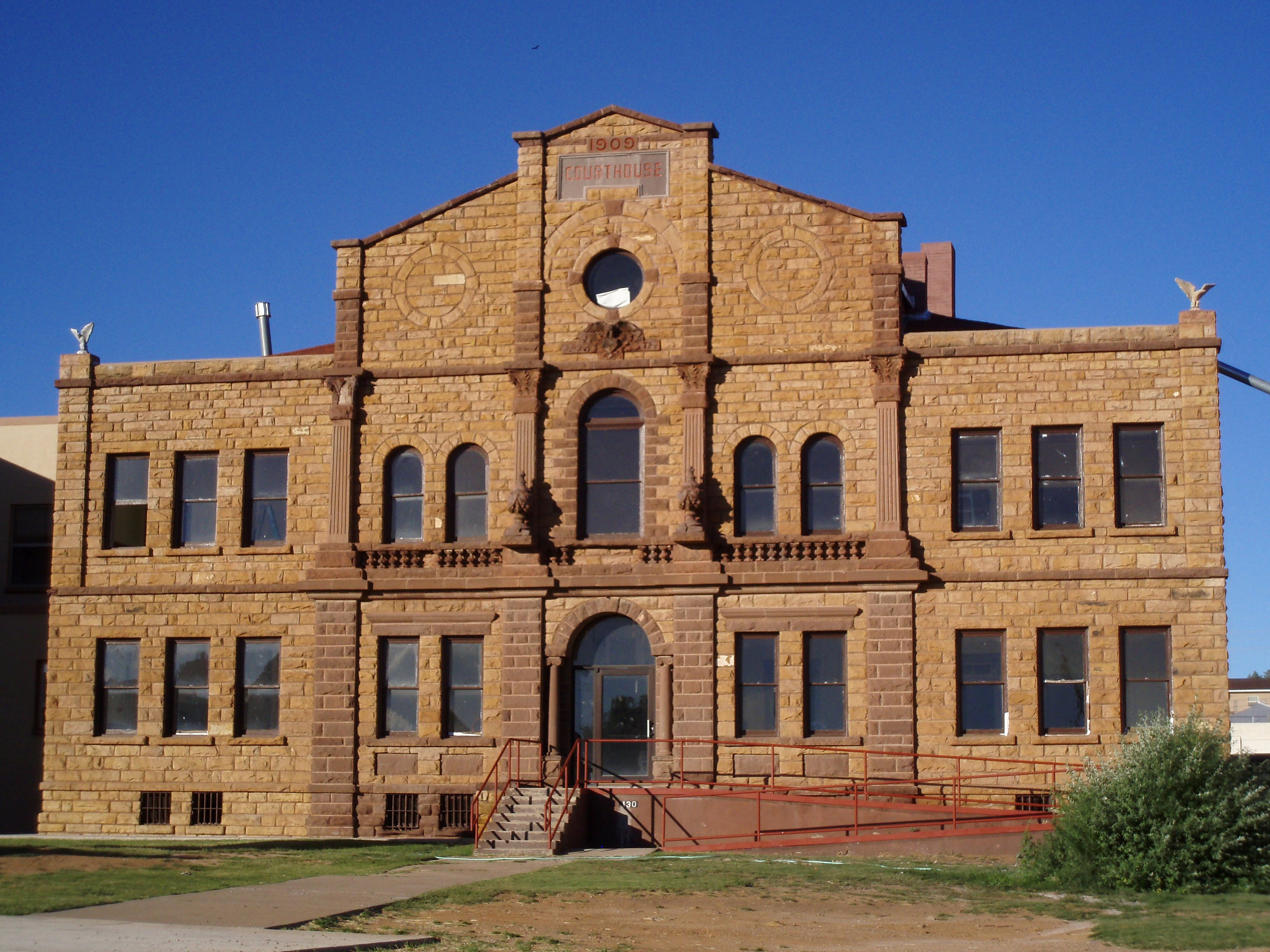
- Courthouse in 2008

- Location within New Mexico
- Location: NW corner S. Fourth St. and Parker Ave., Santa Rosa, New Mexico
- Coordinates: 34°56′29″N 104°41′11″W
- Area: 1.5 acres (0.61 ha)
- Built: 1909
- Architectural style: Richardsonian Romanesque
- MPS: County Courthouses of New Mexico TR
- NRHP reference No.: 87000890
- Added to NRHP: December 7, 1987

The Guadalupe County Courthouse in Santa Rosa, in Santa Rosa, New Mexico, is a former courthouse of Guadalupe County which was built in Richardsonian Romanesque style. It was built in 1909 and was listed on the National Register of Historic Places in 1987.

It was known as the Guadalupe County Courthouse, and has also been known as Santa Rosa Courthouse. It is a two-story building built of red sandstone. As described in its National Register nomination, it has "a hipped roof with pedimented and capped false parapet walls at varying heights. Located on the roof at the four corners of the building are carved sandstone eagles and urns; only one of the eagles remains due to deterioration. The false parapet on the southwest (front) facade is larger than the others and embellished with engaged stone pilasters, circular decorative stone inlay, and a cast panel which reads COURTHOUSE. The front facade consists of a central mass and two flanking bays. The second story is detailed with fluted stone engaged pilasters with eagle motif capitals, and a central enlarged window with dark stone quoins and arched transom." The courtroom was on the second floor. In 1987 the building was in deteriorated condition.

It is located at the northwest corner of S. Fourth St. and Parker Ave. in Santa Rosa. There was an earlier Guadalupe County Courthouse in Puerto de Luna.

It later served as a senior citizen center and later still as the Guadalupe County Youth Drop-in-Center.
