= Santa Rosa Airport =

Santa Rosa Airport may refer to:

- Santa Rosa Airport (Argentina) in Santa Rosa, La Pampa Province, Argentina
- Santa Rosa Airport (Bolivia) in Santa Rosa, Beni, Bolivia
- Santa Rosa Airport (Brazil) in Santa Rosa, Rio Grande do Sul, Brazil
- Santa Rosa Airport (Ecuador) in Santa Rosa, El Oro, Ecuador

== See also ==
- Santa Rosa Route 66 Airport in Santa Rosa, New Mexico, United States
- Naval Outlying Landing Field Santa Rosa in Milton, Florida, United States
- Charles M. Schulz - Sonoma County Airport in Santa Rosa, California, United States
