= Llano del Medio, New Mexico =

- Unincorporated community
- Location within New Mexico Location within the United States
- Coordinates: 35°11′15″N 105°07′22″W
- Country: United States
- State: New Mexico
- County: Guadalupe

Area
  - Total: 1.91 sq mi (4.95 km^{2})
  - Land: 1.91 sq mi (4.95 km^{2})
  - Water: 0 sq mi (0.00 km^{2})
- Elevation: 5,204 ft (1,586 m)

Population (2020)
  - Total: 76
  - Density: 39.8/sq mi (15.35/km^{2})
- Time zone: UTC-7 (Mountain (MST))
  - Summer (DST): UTC-6 (MDT)
- Area code: 575
- GNIS feature ID: 2584142

Llano del Medio is an unincorporated community and census-designated place in Guadalupe County, New Mexico, United States. As of the 2020 census, Llano del Medio had a population of 76. New Mexico State Road 119 passes through the community.

== History ==
Llano del Medio is one of several settlements located along the Pecos River in the Anton Chico Land Grant created by the government of New Mexico in 1822. The early inhabitants were Hispanics and genizaros who migrated to LLano del Medio to attain land for growing crops and raising livestock. Llano del Medio served as one of the eastern outposts of New Mexico to defend against Indian raids on settlements in the Rio Grande valley. Many of the ciboleros (bison hunters) and comancheros (traders with the Plains Indians) of the 19th century came from the settlements along the Pecos River.

== Geography ==
According to the U.S. Census Bureau, the community has an area of 1.907 square miles (4.94 km^{2}), all land.

== Demographics ==
Historical population
Census	Pop.	Note	%±
2020	76		—
U.S. Decennial Census

== Education ==
Its school district is Santa Rosa Consolidated Schools.
