= Casaus =

Casaus is a Spanish surname. Notable people with the surname include:

- Albert de Casaus (died 1544) was the Master of the Order of Preachers
- Luis Figueroa y Casaus (1781–1853), Spanish soldier, businessman, and merchant
- Martin Casaus (born 1985), American entrepreneur, content creator, and professional wrestler
- Nicolau Casaus (1913–2007), Catalan businessman and sports leader
- Yolanda Casaus Rodríguez (born 1974), Spanish politician

== See also ==
- Jesus M. Casaus House
- Casau, decentralized municipal entity in Lleida, Catalonia
