= Alexander Grzelachowski House and Store =

- U.S. National Register of Historic Places
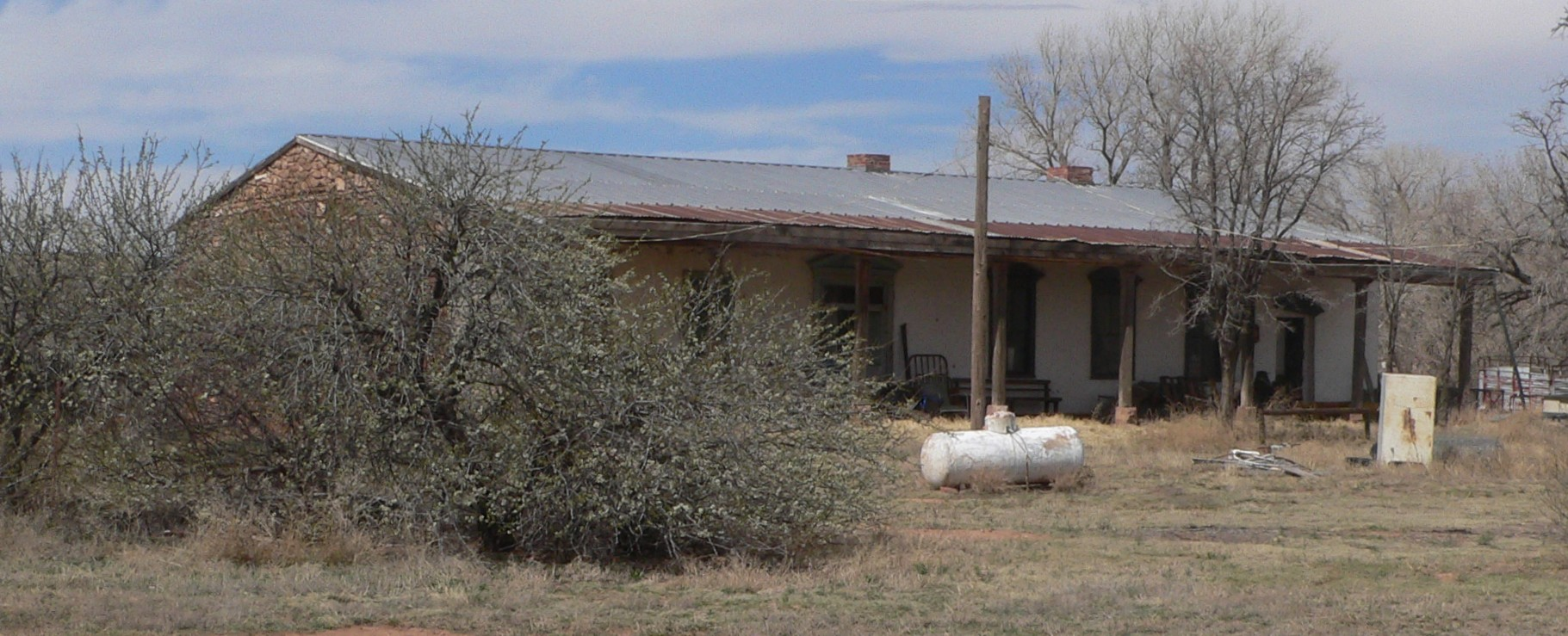

- Location within New Mexico
- Location: SW of jct. of NM 91 and NM 203, Puerto de Luna, New Mexico
- Coordinates: 34°49′50″N 104°37′26″W
- Area: less than one acre
- Built: 1875
- Architectural style: Vernacular, Territorial
- NRHP reference No.: 93000570
- Added to NRHP: June 24, 1993

The Alexander Grzelachowski House and Store, in Puerto de Luna, New Mexico, was built in 1875. It was listed on the National Register of Historic Places in 1993.

It is significant as "an exceptional example of a nineteenth-century, Territorial-style, combined dwelling and place of business."

The store was a popular stop for area ranchers and travelers through the Pecos Valley.

== See also ==
- National Register of Historic Places listings in Guadalupe County, New Mexico
