= New Mexico State Road 451 =

State highway in New Mexico, United States

State Road 451

Route information
- Maintained by NMDOT
- Length: 3.086 mi (4.966 km)

Major junctions
- Southern end: NM 119 near Anton Chico
- Northern end: US 84 near Dilia

Location
- Country: United States
- State: New Mexico
- Counties: Guadalupe, San Miguel

Highway system
- New Mexico State Highway System; Interstate; US; State; Scenic
← NM 450	→ NM 453

State Road 451 (NM 451) is a 3.1-mile-long (5.0 km) state highway in the US state of New Mexico. NM 451's northern terminus is at U.S. Route 84 (US 84) north of Dilia, and the southern terminus is at NM 119 east of Anton Chico.

== Major intersections ==
County	Location	mi	km	Destinations	Notes
Guadalupe		0.000	0.000	NM 119	Southern terminus
San Miguel		3.086	4.966	US 84	Northern terminus
1.000 mi = 1.609 km; 1.000 km = 0.621 mi
