= New Mexico State Road 369 =

State highway in New Mexico, United States

State Road 369

Route information
- Maintained by NMDOT
- Length: 2.4 mi (3.9 km)

Major junctions
- Western end: US 84 / US 285 in San Pedro
- Eastern end: US 84 / US 285 in San Pedro

Location
- Country: United States
- State: New Mexico
- Counties: Rio Arriba

Highway system
- New Mexico State Highway System; Interstate; US; State; Scenic
| ← NM 368 | → NM 370 |

State Road 369 (NM 369) is a 2.4-mile-long (3.9 km) state highway in the US state of New Mexico. NM 369's western terminus is at U.S. Route 84 (US 84) and US 285 in San Pedro, and the eastern terminus is at US 84 and US 285 in San Pedro.

== Major intersections ==
The entire route is in San Pedro, Rio Arriba County.

| mi | km | Destinations | Notes |
|---|---|---|---|
| 0.000 | 0.000 | US 84 / US 285 | Western terminus |
| 1.300 | 2.092 | NM 581 east | Western terminus of NM 581 |
| 2.400 | 3.862 | US 84 / US 285 | Eastern terminus |
1.000 mi = 1.609 km; 1.000 km = 0.621 mi
