= Santa Rosa Consolidated Schools =

School district in New Mexico

Address
- 344 4th Street Santa Rosa, New Mexico, 88435; United States

District information
- Type: Public
- Grades: PK–12
- Schools: 5
- NCES District ID: 3502400

Students and staff
- Students: 572 (2025–2026)
- Teachers: 60.51 (on an FTE basis) (2025–2026)
- Staff: 91.86 (on an FTE basis) (2025–2026)
- Student–teacher ratio: 9.45 (2025–2026)

Other information
- Website: www.srlions.com

Santa Rosa Consolidated School District, also known as Santa Rosa Consolidated Schools (SRCS), is a school district headquartered in Santa Rosa, New Mexico.

Within Guadalupe County the district includes Santa Rosa, Anton Chico, Llano del Medio, Newkirk, and Puerto de Luna. It also includes a portion of San Miguel County, which has the community of Tecolotito.

== History ==
The district was established in 1912.

Prior to 1973 the school district closed the junior high school in the Anton Chico area and began sending middle school students to Santa Rosa. This in turn made the Anton Chico residents upset at the school district. The West Las Vegas School District offered to have school bus transportation from Anton Chico to its schools and asked the State of New Mexico to pay for the transportation costs, but in 1973 the New Mexico State Board of Education denied the request to pay. In 1973 the Anton Chico elementary, which covered Kindergarten through grade 6, had 154 students.

In 1988 Serafin Padilla was the superintendent. That year the board of education was deciding whether to retain him.

== Schools ==
High schools

- Santa Rosa High School

Middle schools

- Anton Chico Middle School
  - It, with Marquez, was built by Franken Construction.
- Santa Rosa Middle School

Elementary schools

- Rita M. Marquez Elementary School (Anton Chico)
- Santa Rosa Elementary School
