= Colonias, New Mexico =

Community in Guadalupe County, New Mexico

Coordinates: 35°06′35″N 104°50′50″W

Colonias, New Mexico is a community, and somewhat of a ghost town, in Guadalupe County, New Mexico. It is located within the Anton Chico Land Grant, on New Mexico State Road 379 about 14 miles (23 km) northwest of Santa Rosa, New Mexico. Online maps point to a current community, which is in the same location as the ghost town.

The San Jose Catholic Church and cemetery are located in Colonias, NM and masses were held in the original church building until 1992.

Colonias is the location of two historic districts listed on the National Register of Historic Places:

- Colonias de San Jose Historic District, listed September 29, 1986 (#86002331), and
- La Placita De Abajo District, listed September 29, 1986 (#86002338)

Note: The term "colonias" in New Mexico and Arizona also applies to 227 officially designated "colonias", border communities along the southern border to Mexico. These border communities are different than the Colonias in Guadalupe County, which is not close to the border.
