= J. Julian Moise House =

- U.S. National Register of Historic Places
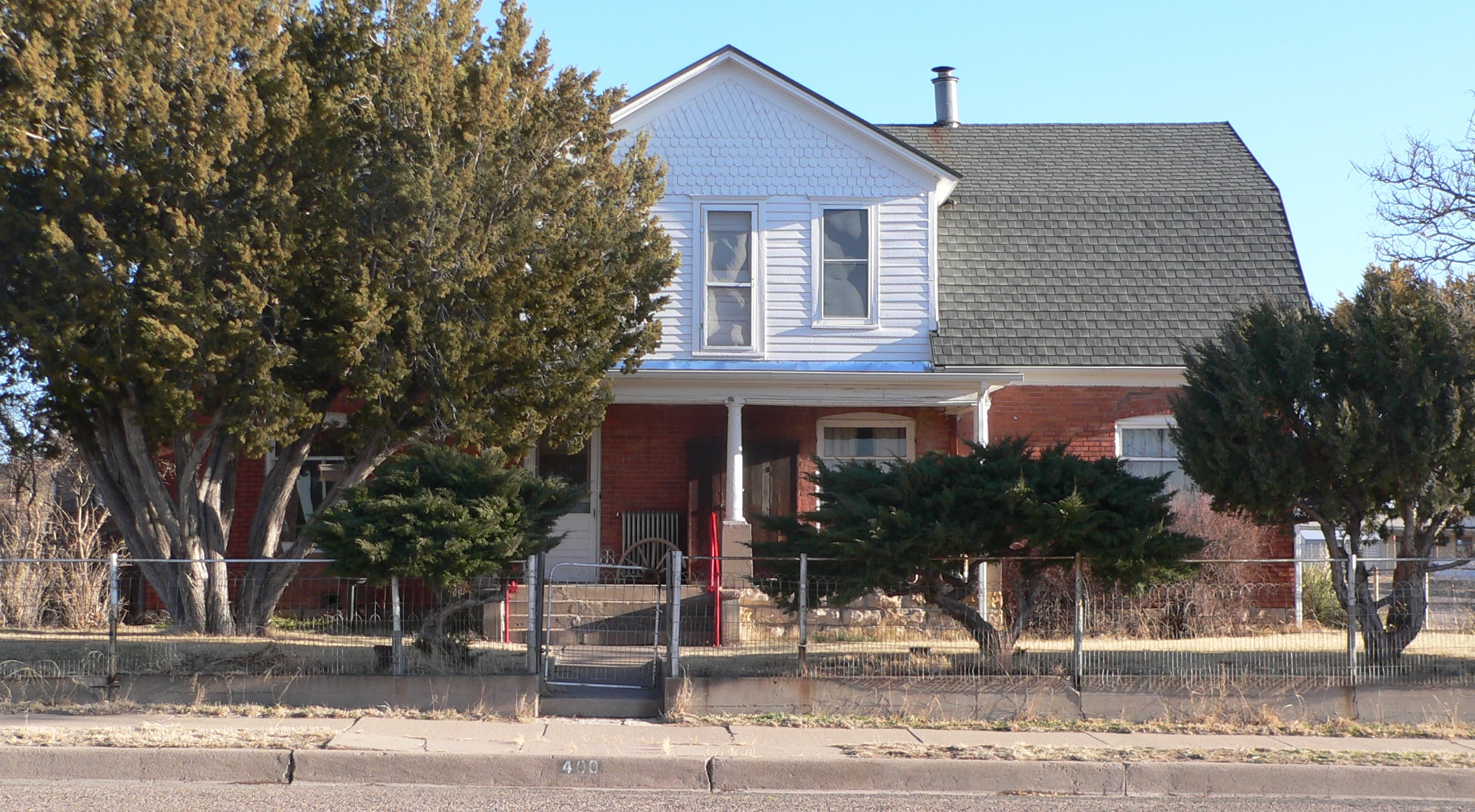

- Location within New Mexico Location within the United States
- Location: 400 Capitan, Santa Rosa, New Mexico
- Coordinates: 34°56′20″N 104°41′03″W
- Area: less than one acre
- Built: 1904
- Architect: J.C. Calhoun
- Architectural style: Colonial Revival
- NRHP reference No.: 84000633
- Added to NRHP: December 27, 1984

The J. Julian Moise House, at 400 Capitan in Santa Rosa, New Mexico, was built in 1904. It was listed on the National Register of Historic Places in 1984. It has also been referred to as the Julian House. (Note: The listing was recorded in the NRIS database erroneously calling it the "Julius J. Moise House", apparently in error as the NRHP nomination document is clear that "J. Julian Moise" was the name of the house owner.")

The house is a one-and-a-half-story brick and wood-frame house built upon a sandstone foundation, and is about 27 by 42 feet (8.2 m × 12.8 m) in plan. It includes some elements of Colonial Revival style, including a porch with Doric columns.

A second contributing building on its lot is an adobe storage building, about 13 by 30 feet (4.0 m × 9.1 m) in plan, with a hipped, corrugated metal roof.
