= Jesus M. Casaus House =

- U.S. National Register of Historic Places
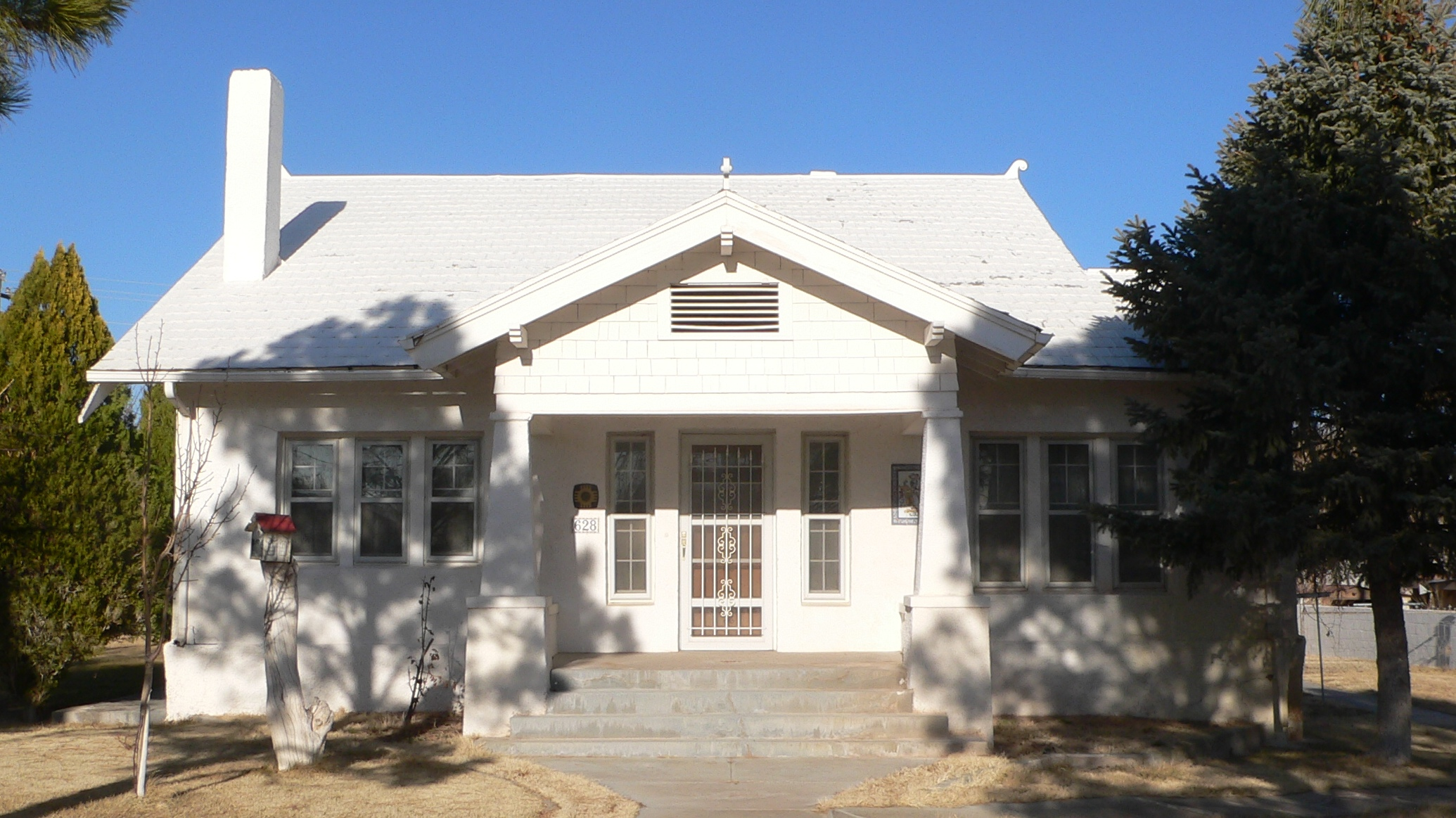

- Location within New Mexico
- Location: 628 3rd St., Santa Rosa, New Mexico
- Coordinates: 34°56′09″N 104°40′52″W
- Area: less than one acre
- Built: c.1917-19
- Architectural style: Bungalow/craftsman
- NRHP reference No.: 82003324
- Added to NRHP: April 1, 1982

The Jesus M. Casaus House, at 628 3rd St. in Santa Rosa, New Mexico, was built in 1917. It was listed on the National Register of Historic Places in 1982. The listing included three contributing buildings and a contributing structure.

Its National Register nomination asserts:

This two story, pitched roof house constitutes a fine example of the Craftsman/Bungalow Style. The attention to detail, from the battered piers supporting the outside porch to the oak molding and stenciled wall patterning on the interior, is evident throughout the structure. Despite the enclosure of the original back porch, the structure currently expresses an integrity of form in its low-lying massing, craftsman-like detailing and consistency between exterior and interior.

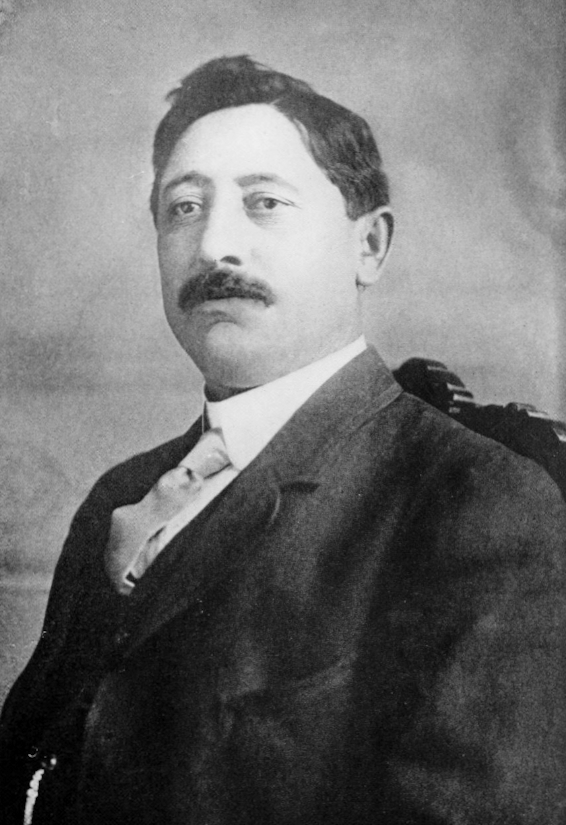
Jesus M. Casaus

The house was built by or for Jesus M. Casaus (1867–1958), a sheriff of Guadalupe County and a New Mexico state legislator.

Contributing outbuildings are a two-room storage building and a stone garage. An underground water cistern with a covering structure, and a water pump, also contribute.
