= Newkirk, New Mexico =

- Census-designated place
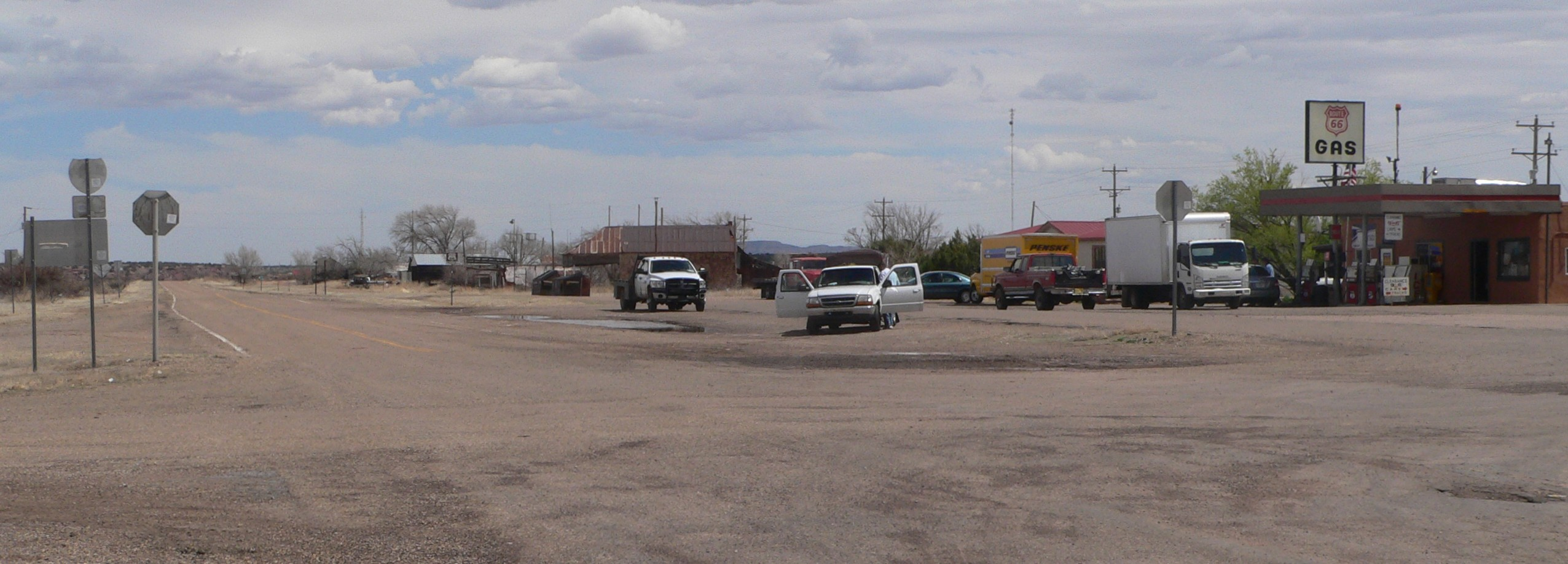

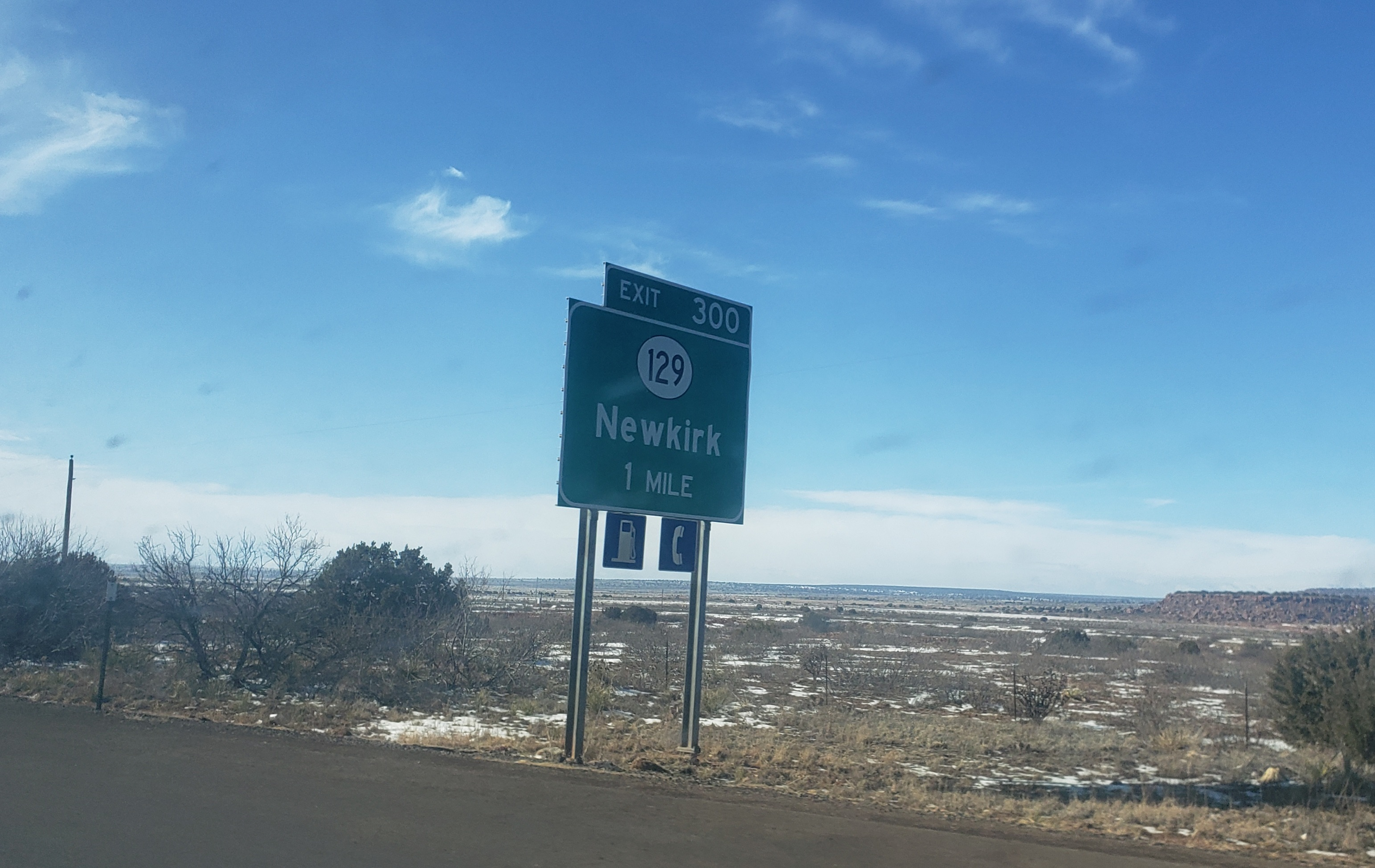

- Location within New Mexico Location within the United States
- Coordinates: 35°04′06″N 104°15′53″W
- Country: United States
- State: New Mexico
- County: Guadalupe

Area
  - Total: 1.09 sq mi (2.82 km^{2})
  - Land: 1.09 sq mi (2.82 km^{2})
  - Water: 0 sq mi (0.00 km^{2})
- Elevation: 4,574 ft (1,394 m)

Population (2020)
  - Total: 8
  - Density: 7.4/sq mi (2.84/km^{2})
- Time zone: UTC-7 (Mountain (MST))
  - Summer (DST): UTC-6 (MDT)
- ZIP code: 88431
- Area code: 575
- GNIS feature ID: 2584163

Newkirk is a census-designated place in Guadalupe County, New Mexico, United States. The community is located at the junction of Interstate 40 and New Mexico State Road 129; historic U.S. Route 66 also passes through the community. Its population was 8 as of the 2020 census. Newkirk has a post office serving ZIP Code 88431.

== History ==
Newkirk was originally called Conant; it was founded in the early 20th century along Route 66. In the 1930s, Newkirk had several restaurants, cabins, four gas stations, as well as De Baca's Trading Post. It is now considered a ghost town.

== Geography ==
=== Climate ===
Climate data for Newkirk, New Mexico (1991–2020)
Month	Jan	Feb	Mar	Apr	May	Jun	Jul	Aug	Sep	Oct	Nov	Dec	Year
Mean daily maximum °F (°C)	54.6 (12.6)	58.0 (14.4)	66.3 (19.1)	74.5 (23.6)	82.7 (28.2)	92.2 (33.4)	94.3 (34.6)	92.0 (33.3)	85.7 (29.8)	75.2 (24.0)	62.4 (16.9)	53.8 (12.1)	74.3 (23.5)
Daily mean °F (°C)	38.8 (3.8)	42.2 (5.7)	49.6 (9.8)	57.4 (14.1)	66.2 (19.0)	75.6 (24.2)	79.0 (26.1)	77.0 (25.0)	70.1 (21.2)	58.9 (14.9)	46.9 (8.3)	39.1 (3.9)	58.4 (14.7)
Mean daily minimum °F (°C)	23.1 (−4.9)	26.3 (−3.2)	32.9 (0.5)	40.3 (4.6)	49.7 (9.8)	58.9 (14.9)	63.7 (17.6)	62.1 (16.7)	54.6 (12.6)	42.6 (5.9)	31.3 (−0.4)	24.4 (−4.2)	42.5 (5.8)
Average precipitation inches (mm)	0.47 (12)	0.29 (7.4)	0.81 (21)	1.12 (28)	1.32 (34)	1.34 (34)	2.10 (53)	2.51 (64)	2.02 (51)	1.42 (36)	0.46 (12)	0.72 (18)	14.58 (370.4)
Average snowfall inches (cm)	3.5 (8.9)	0.7 (1.8)	1.8 (4.6)	0.6 (1.5)	0.0 (0.0)	0.0 (0.0)	0.0 (0.0)	0.0 (0.0)	0.0 (0.0)	0.5 (1.3)	1.5 (3.8)	6.6 (17)	15.2 (38.9)
Source: NOAA

== Demographics ==
Historical population
Census	Pop.	Note	%±
2020	8		—
U.S. Decennial Census

== Education ==
Its school district is Santa Rosa Consolidated Schools.

== Notable person ==
- Fabiola Cabeza de Baca Gilbert (1894-1991) - educator, nutritionist, activist, writer, inventor of the u-shaped fried taco shell.
