= Park Lake Historic District =

- U.S. National Register of Historic Places
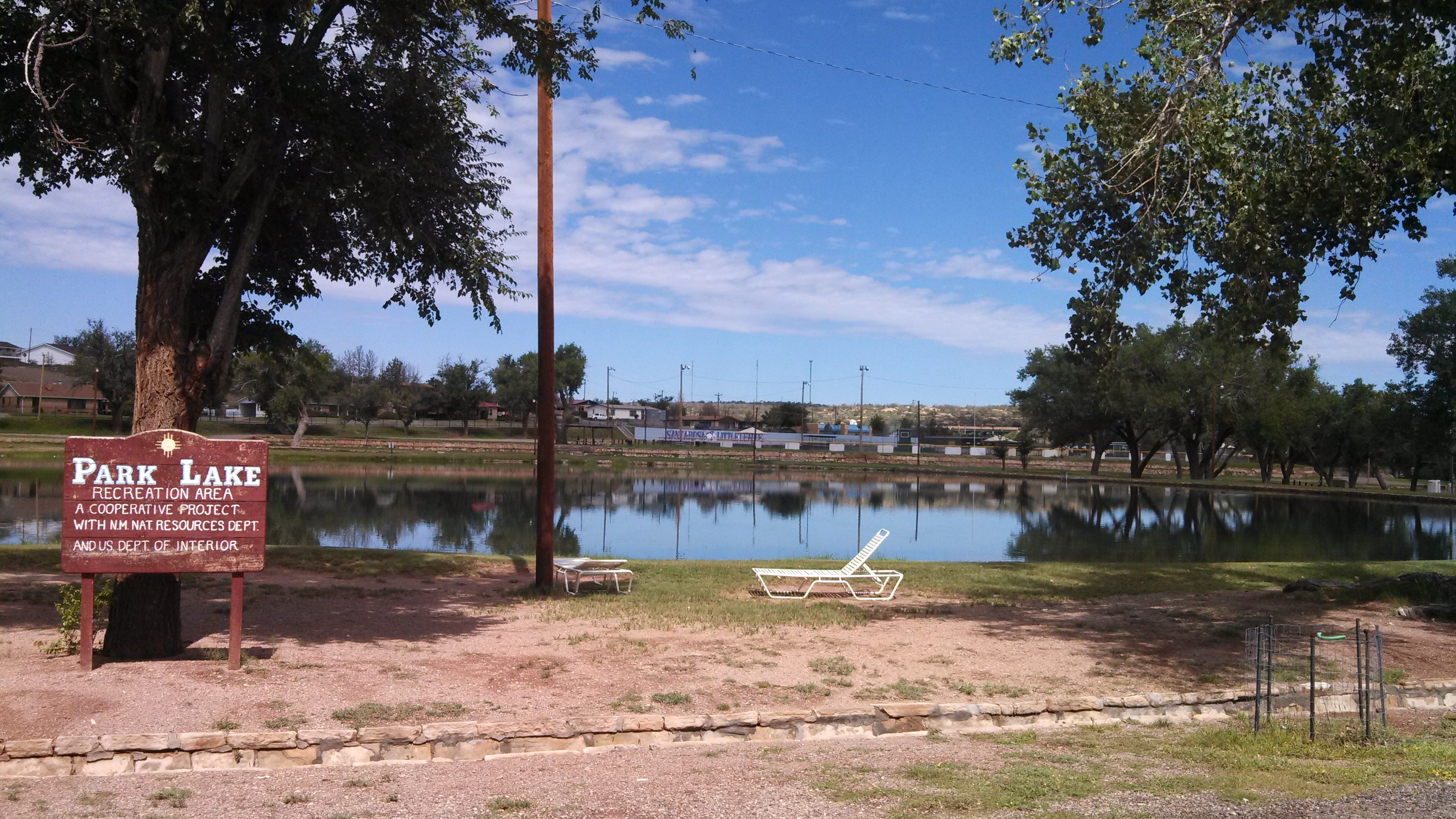

- Location within New Mexico
- Location: Jct. of Will Rogers Dr. and Lake Dr., Santa Rosa, New Mexico
- Coordinates: 34°56′28″N 104°40′40″W
- Area: 25 acres (10 ha)
- Built: 1934
- Built by: WPA; FERA
- Architectural style: Mission/spanish Revival
- MPS: New Deal in New Mexico MPS
- NRHP reference No.: 96000267
- Added to NRHP: March 15, 1996

The Park Lake Historic District, at the junction of Will Rogers Dr. and Lake Dr. in Santa Rosa, New Mexico, is a 25 acres (10 ha) historic district which was listed on the National Register of Historic Places in 1996. The district included one contributing building: a stone storage building, two contributing structures: stone walls and canals, and three contributing sites: a lake, a playing field, and landscaped area surrounding the lake.
