= New Mexico State Road 202 =

State highway in New Mexico, United States

State Road 202

Route information
- Maintained by NMDOT
- Length: 12.6 mi (20.3 km)

Major junctions
- West end: US 70 near Portales
- East end: FM 1760 at the Texas state line

Location
- Country: United States
- State: New Mexico
- Counties: Roosevelt

Highway system
- New Mexico State Highway System; Interstate; US; State; Scenic
← NM 201	→ NM 203

State Road 202 (NM 202) is a 12.6-mile-long (20.3 km) state highway in the US state of New Mexico. NM 202's western terminus is at U.S. Route 70 (US 70) northeast of Portales, and the eastern terminus is at Farm to Market Road 1760 (FM 1760) at the Texas state line.

== Major intersections ==
The entire route is in Roosevelt County.

Location	mi	km	Destinations	Notes
	0.000	0.000	US 70 – Portales, Clovis	Western terminus
	12.600	20.278	FM 1760 – Muleshoe	Eastern terminus, continues east into Texas
1.000 mi = 1.609 km; 1.000 km = 0.621 mi
