= Joe A. Campos =

American politician

Joe Campos

Member of the New Mexico House of Representatives from the 63rd district
- In office 2003–2010

Personal details
- Born: June 8, 1961 (age 65) Santa Rosa, New Mexico
- Party: Democratic
- Spouse: Christina
- Children: Analisa, Andrea, Jose
- Education: UNM
- Profession: politician, businessman
- Website: http://www.joecampos.org

Jose "Joe" A. Campos (born June 8, 1961) is a politician and businessman from Santa Rosa, New Mexico. Since 2003, he has served as a member of the New Mexico House of Representatives representing the 63rd district that includes DeBaca, Curry, Guadalupe, & Roosevelt counties.

== Early life, family, and small business owner ==
Joe Campos was born in Santa Rosa, New Mexico, son of a veteran, and is a graduate of the New Mexico Military Institute and the University of New Mexico. Campos is a small businessman who owns and operates Joseph's Restaurant in Santa Rosa with 34 employees. Joe Campos is married to wife of 24 years, Christina, who is the administrator at the Guadalupe Hospital in Santa Rosa. They have three children, Analisa, Andrea, and Jose.

== County Commissioner and Mayor of Santa Rosa ==
Campos began his public service as a Guadalupe County commissioner serving from 1991-1992.

Campos continued his political career and was elected mayor of Santa Rosa in 1998 and is currently serving his third consecutive term.

== State representative ==
Campos has served as a state representative since elected to office in 2003. He is the Chair of Voters and Elections Committee, interim Vice-Chair of the Mortgage Finance Oversight Committee, interim advisor to the New Mexico Finance Authority Oversight Committee and the Legislative Health and Human Services Committee and a member of the Business and Industry Committee.

== Candidate for Lieutenant Governor 2010 ==
On August 11, 2009, Campos announced his intent to run for the Office of Lieutenant Governor in 2010 as a Democrat.
