= Miguel Marquez (journalist) =

American journalist

- Born: Miguel F. Marquez; 1967 (age 58–59); Santa Rosa, New Mexico
- Education: New Mexico Military Institute (in Roswell, New Mexico) (associate's degree), University of New Mexico (B.A. political science), Columbia University (master's in international affairs in)
- Occupation: Broadcast journalist
- Years active: 1990s–present
- Notable credit(s): Headline News anchor, Los Angeles-based correspondent for CNN, Coverage of the 2011 Bahraini protests for ABC News
- Title: National Correspondent
- Website: http://www.cnn.com/profiles/miguel-marquez-profile

Miguel Marquez (born 1967) is a U.S. national correspondent for CNN, based in the network's New York offices.

His earlier journalistic positions have included stints with WNBC-TV in New York City (1998–1999) and KSAZ-TV in Phoenix, Arizona (1999–2002). He then worked for a short time as an anchor at Headline News, before transferring to CNN as a Los Angeles-based correspondent in March 2003, where he worked until 2005. In May 2005 he joined ABC News' Los Angeles bureau, covering everything from the entertainment industry to the California wildfires, often spending extended periods on assignment in Iraq. He later moved to ABC News' London bureau in 2008 where he was posted until 2011. In February 2012, Marquez rejoined CNN as a correspondent in their Los Angeles bureau, eventually moving to the New York City bureau as a national correspondent. The Albuquerque Journal reported on January 19, 2026, that Marquez will be co-anchoring KOAT's Action 7 News, More in the Morning, starting January 26, 2026. KOAT is an affiliate of the ABC network.

Raised in Santa Rosa, New Mexico, Marquez earned an associate degree from the New Mexico Military Institute in Roswell, New Mexico. He earned a bachelor's degree in political science from the University of New Mexico and a master's in international affairs from Columbia University.

Marquez initially got his start in the news industry at CBS News as a national desk assistant for the CBS Evening News, 48 Hours, and 60 Minutes.

Marquez is a member of the National Association of Hispanic Journalists and the National Lesbian and Gay Journalists Association.

Marquez was attacked by Bahraini police forces while covering the 2011 Bahraini protests in Pearl Square, bravely continuing with a phone call report to ABC News in New York as he was targeted: "There was a canister that looked like -- No! No! No! Hey! I'm a journalist here! I'm going! I'm going! I'm going! I'm going! ... I'm hit."
