= Santa Rosa Route 66 Airport =

- IATA: none; ICAO: KSXU; FAA LID: SXU

Summary
- Airport type: Public
- Owner: Town of Santa Rosa
- Serves: Santa Rosa, New Mexico
- Elevation AMSL: 4,791 ft / 1,460 m
- Coordinates: 34°56′08″N 104°38′33″W
- Interactive map of Santa Rosa Route 66 Airport

Runways
Direction	Length		Surface
Direction	ft	m	Surface
1/19	5,013	1,528	Asphalt
8/26	4,294	1,309	Asphalt

Statistics (2021)
- Aircraft operations (year ending 4/1/2021): 2,130
- Source: Federal Aviation Administration

Santa Rosa Route 66 Airport (ICAO: KSXU, FAA LID: SXU, formerly I58) is a public use airport located three nautical miles (6 km) east of the central business district of Santa Rosa, a town in Guadalupe County, New Mexico, United States. It is owned by the Town of Santa Rosa. The original runway, 08-26, was a section of old U.S. Highway 66 prior to the construction of Interstate 40. The second runway, 01-19, was added in the mid-1990's.

Although most U.S. airports use the same three-letter location identifier for the FAA and IATA, this airport is assigned SXU by the FAA but has no designation from the IATA (which assigned SXU to Soddu, Ethiopia).

== Facilities and aircraft ==
Santa Rosa Route 66 Airport covers an area of 401 acres (162 ha) at an elevation of 4,791 feet (1,460 m) above mean sea level. It has two asphalt paved runways: 1/19 is 5,013 by 75 feet (1,528 x 23 m) and 8/26 is 4,294 by 60 feet (1,309 x 18 m).

For the 12-month period ending April 1, 2021, the airport had 4,150 aircraft operations, an average of 80 per week: 96% general aviation, 3% air taxi, and <1% military.
