= Sumner Dam =

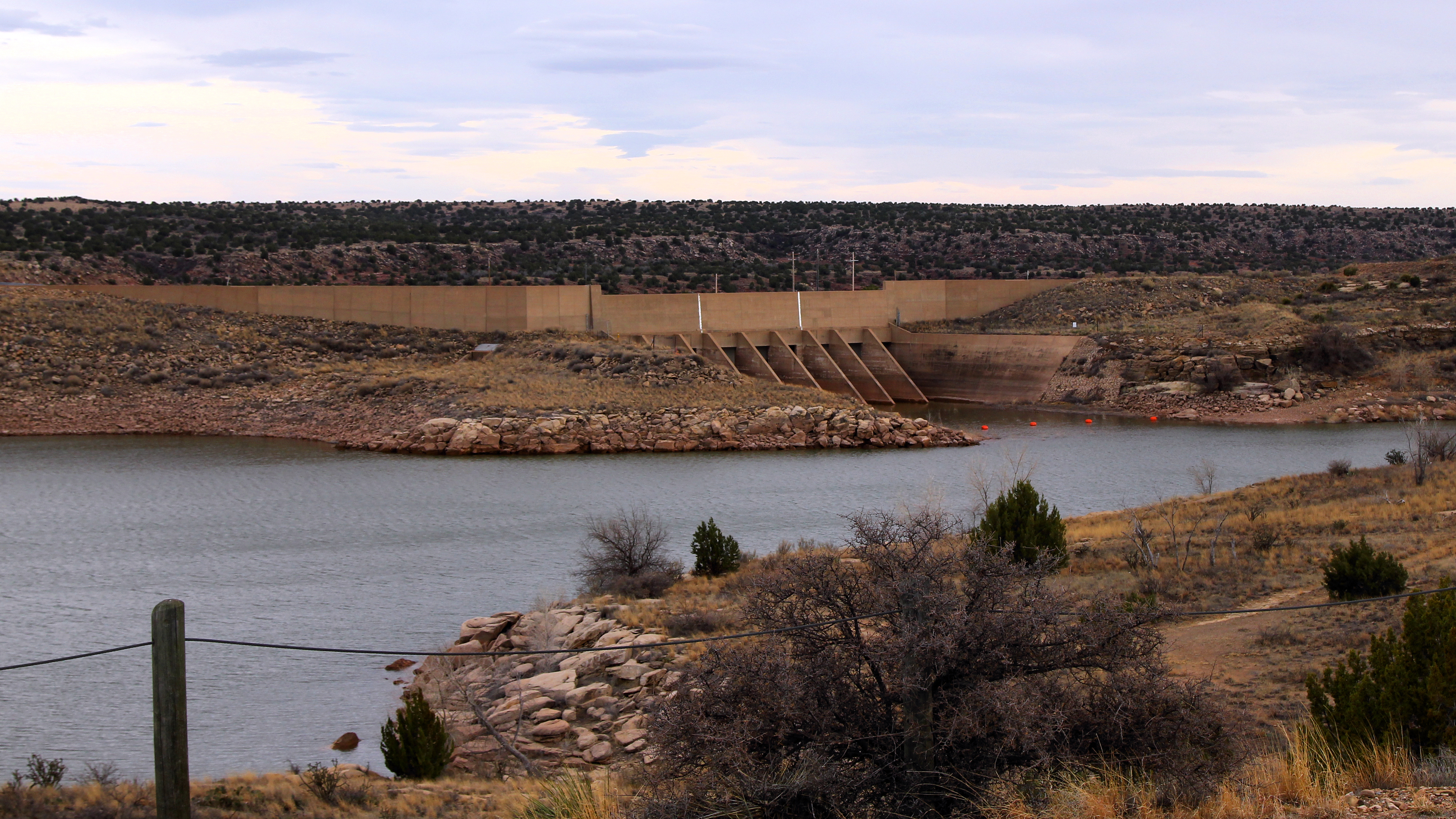
- Upstream side of Sumner Dam

- Location within New Mexico
- Country: United States
- Location: De Baca County, New Mexico
- Coordinates: 34°36′29″N 104°23′11″W
- Purpose: Irrigation

Dam and spillways
- Height: 164 feet (50 m)

Reservoir
- Total capacity: 43,800 acre-feet (54,000,000 m^{3})
- Maximum water depth: 143 ft (44 m)

Sumner Dam is a dam on the Pecos River in De Baca County in eastern New Mexico.

The dam was built by the United States Bureau of Reclamation between 1935 and 1939, a project governed by the Bureau in conjunction with the local Carlsbad Irrigation District. Construction was done by the Bureau with the help of workers of the Works Progress Administration and the Civilian Conservation Corps; some remnants of their artistic rockwork are the five rock bridges on the main road on the east side of the lake.

The dam is 164 feet tall and impounds the Pecos with a total capacity of about 43,800 acre-feet. The resulting reservoir, Lake Sumner, is the location of the community of Lake Sumner, New Mexico, and of Sumner Lake State Park. The state park was established in 1966 on a 50-year lease from the Bureau of Reclamation (expiring in 2016), and originally called Alamogordo Lake State Park. The lake was completely drained for irrigation needs in 2001, destroying fish stocks, but recreational use has since rebounded. The state park is unusual in providing public access to the riparian zone below the dam.
