= New Mexico State Road 386 =

State highway in New Mexico, United States

State Road 386

Route information
- Maintained by NMDOT
- Length: 8.820 mi (14.194 km)

Major junctions
- South end: NM 386 loop in Anton Chico
- NM 119 in Anton Chico
- North end: US 84 near Dilia

Location
- Country: United States
- State: New Mexico
- Counties: Guadalupe, San Miguel

Highway system
- New Mexico State Highway System; Interstate; US; State; Scenic
← NM 385	→ NM 387

State Road 386 (NM 386) is a 8.8-mile-long (14.2 km) state highway in the US state of New Mexico. NM 386's southern terminus is at a loop of NM 386 in Anton Chico, and the northern terminus is at U.S. Route 84 (US 84) northwest of Dilia.

== Major intersections ==
County	Location	mi	km	Destinations	Notes
San Miguel		0.000	0.000	US 84	Northern terminus
Guadalupe	Anton Chico	8.300	13.358	NM 119 east	Western terminus of NM 119
Guadalupe	Anton Chico	8.820	14.194	NM 386 Loop	Southern terminus
1.000 mi = 1.609 km; 1.000 km = 0.621 mi
