= New Mexico State Road 91 =

State highway in New Mexico, United States

State Road 91
- NM 91 highlighted in red

Route information
- Maintained by NMDOT
- Length: 12.619 mi (20.308 km)

Major junctions
- North end: I-40 BL / US 54 / Historic US 66 in Santa Rosa
- South end: Paseo del Sol near Puerto de Luna

Location
- Country: United States
- State: New Mexico
- Counties: Guadalupe

Highway system
- New Mexico State Highway System; Interstate; US; State; Scenic
← NM 90	→ NM 92

State Road 91 (NM 91) is a state highway in the US state of New Mexico. Its total length is approximately 12.6 miles (20.3 km).

== Route Description ==
NM 91's southern terminus is south of Puerto de Luna where the state maintenance ends and it continues south as Paseo del Sol. It crosses the Pecos River in Puerto de Luna, then heads north into Santa Rosa. Its northern terminus is at Historic US 66 (Interstate 40 Business/U.S. Route 54) in Santa Rosa.

== Major intersections ==
The entire route is in Guadalupe County.

Location	mi	km	Destinations	Notes
	12.619	20.308	Paseo del Sol	Continuation beyond southern terminus
Santa Rosa	0.000	0.000	Historic US 66 (I-40 BL / US 54)	Northern terminus
1.000 mi = 1.609 km; 1.000 km = 0.621 mi: Route transition
