= San Pedro, New Mexico =

- Unincorporated community
- Location within New Mexico
- Coordinates: 35°14′23″N 106°10′45″W
- Country: United States
- State: New Mexico
- County: Santa Fe

Area
  - Total: 9.76 sq mi (25.29 km^{2})
  - Land: 9.76 sq mi (25.29 km^{2})
  - Water: 0 sq mi (0.00 km^{2})
- Elevation: 7,034 ft (2,144 m)

Population (2020)
  - Total: 205
  - Density: 21.0/sq mi (8.11/km^{2})
- Time zone: UTC-7 (Mountain (MST))
  - Summer (DST): UTC-6 (MDT)
- Area code: 505
- GNIS feature ID: 2584212

San Pedro is an unincorporated community and census-designated place in Santa Fe County, New Mexico, United States. As of the 2020 census, San Pedro had a population of 205. New Mexico State Road 344 passes through the community.

== Geography ==
According to the U.S. Census Bureau, the community has an area of 9.764 square miles (25.29 km^{2}), all land.

== Demographics ==
Historical population
Census	Pop.	Note	%±
2020	205		—
U.S. Decennial Census

== Education ==
It is within Moriarty-Edgewood School District.
