= Tecolotito, New Mexico =

- Unincorporated community
- Location within New Mexico
- Coordinates: 35°13′51″N 105°09′47″W
- Country: United States
- State: New Mexico
- County: San Miguel

Area
  - Total: 0.72 sq mi (1.86 km^{2})
  - Land: 0.72 sq mi (1.86 km^{2})
  - Water: 0 sq mi (0.00 km^{2})
- Elevation: 5,341 ft (1,628 m)

Population (2020)
  - Total: 204
  - Density: 283.9/sq mi (109.61/km^{2})
- Time zone: UTC-7 (Mountain (MST))
  - Summer (DST): UTC-6 (MDT)
- Area code: 505
- GNIS feature ID: 2584223

Tecolotito is an unincorporated community and census-designated place in San Miguel County, New Mexico, United States. The word "Tecolotito" has its origin in the Nahuatl language, tecolatl. Adopted into Mexican Spanish it means "small owl." As of the 2020 census, Tecolotito had a population of 204.

== Geography ==
Tecolotito is located near the junction of the Pecos River and Tecolote Creek. According to the U.S. Census Bureau, the community has an area of 0.715 square miles (1.85 km^{2}), all land. New Mexico State Road 386 passes through the community

== Demographics ==
Historical population
Census	Pop.	Note	%±
2020	204		—
U.S. Decennial Census

== Education ==
Its school district is Santa Rosa Consolidated Schools.
