= Sumner Lake State Park =

State park in New Mexico, United States

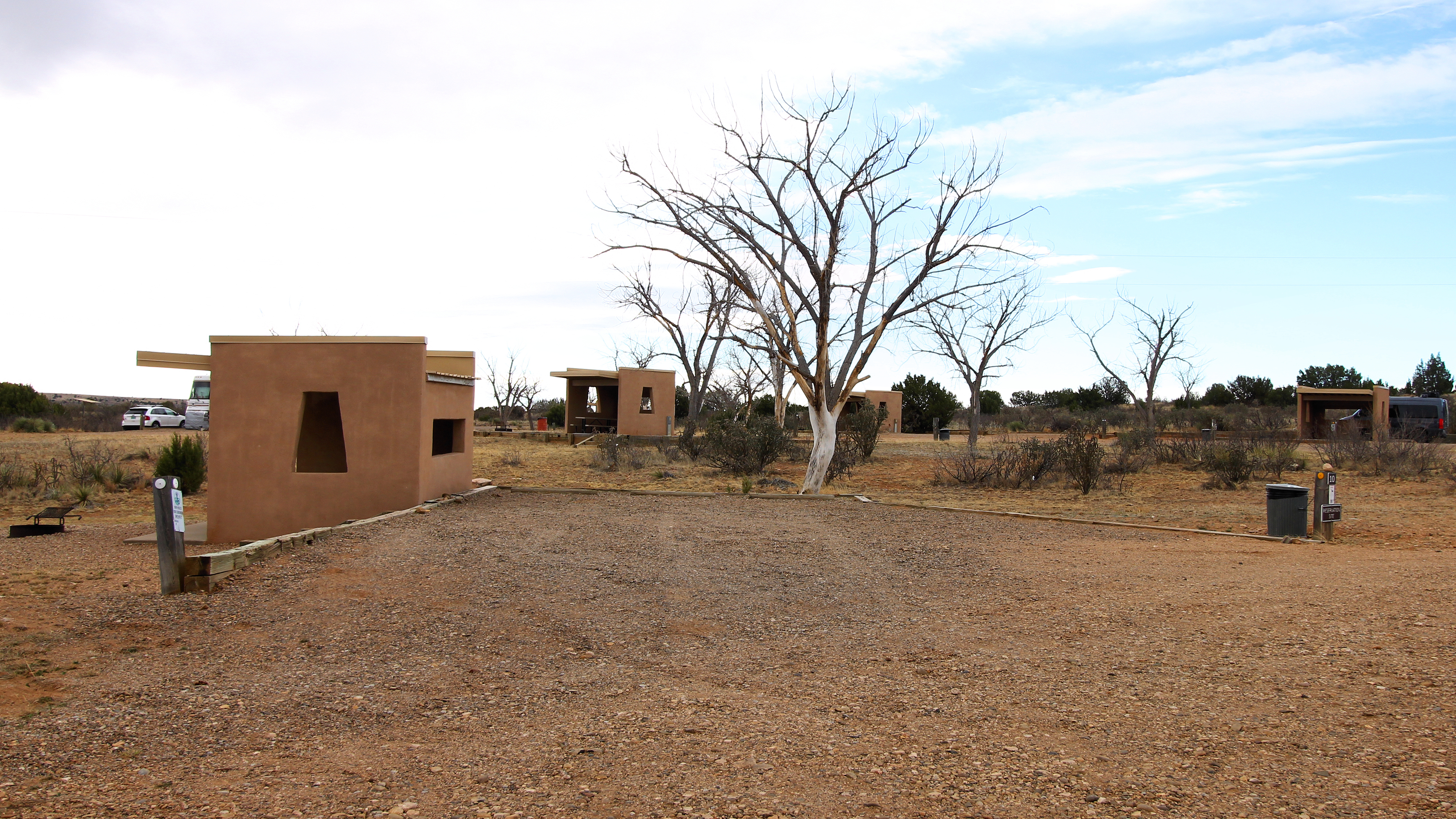
- Pecos Campground

- Location within New Mexico
- Location: De Baca County, New Mexico, United States
- Coordinates: 34°36′45″N 104°23′46″W
- Area: 6,700 acres (2,700 ha)
- Elevation: 4,310 ft (1,310 m)
- Established: 1966
- Administrator: New Mexico State Parks Division
- Website: Official website

Sumner Lake State Park is a state park in De Baca County, New Mexico, United States, located on the eastern plains about 8 miles (13 km) northwest of Fort Sumner. The park features a large 4,500-acre (1,800 ha) reservoir on the Pecos River, created in 1939 by the Sumner Dam of the United States Bureau of Reclamation. The reservoir is home to various fish species including largemouth bass, catfish, crappie and walleye. The park elevation is 4,300 feet (1,300 m) above sea level.

== Animals ==
The park is home to the Sandia hairstreak (Callophrys mcfarlandi), New Mexico's state butterfly. About 50 other species of butterflies have been identified in the park.

== Flora ==
One-seed juniper, honey mesquite, and spiny cholla dominate the landscape of the park.
