= Anton Chico, New Mexico =

- Census-designated place
- Location within New Mexico Location within the United States
- Coordinates: 35°11′42″N 105°08′38″W
- Country: United States
- State: New Mexico
- County: Guadalupe

Area
  - Total: 1.79 sq mi (4.63 km^{2})
  - Land: 1.79 sq mi (4.63 km^{2})
  - Water: 0 sq mi (0.00 km^{2})
- Elevation: 5,309 ft (1,618 m)

Population (2020)
  - Total: 161
  - Density: 90.2/sq mi (34.81/km^{2})
- Time zone: UTC-7 (Mountain (MST))
  - Summer (DST): UTC-6 (MDT)
- ZIP code: 87711
- Area code: 575
- GNIS feature ID: 2584047

Anton Chico, or Anton Chico Abajo or Anton Chico de Abajo, is a census-designated place in Guadalupe County, New Mexico, United States. As of the 2020 census, Anton Chico had a population of 161. Anton Chico has a post office with ZIP code 87711. New Mexico State Road 386 passes through the community. Anton Chico is listed in the National Register of Historic Places.

== History ==
Prior to 1786, when a peace treaty was concluded with the Comanches, Spanish settlements in New Mexico were confined to the Rio Grande valley and nearby. The reduced threat from the Comanches, the most numerous and dangerous of the Indian peoples surrounding the New Mexican settlements, permitted the expansion of the Spanish eastward into the Pecos River valley and onto the Great Plains. The motivation for the Pecos Valley settlements was the growing population of New Mexico plus the need to defend the Spanish and Puebloan settlements in the Rio Grande valley from raids by Apache and other Indian peoples.

In 1822 the government of New Mexico created the Anton Chico Land Grant, 378,537 acres (153,188 ha) in size. Salvador Tapia and 36 others petitioned the government for the grant. In exchange they promised to take up residence in the grant area, to hold the land in common for themselves and future settlers, and to obtain firearms and bows and arrows to defend the settlement against Indian attacks. The initial settlers came to Anton Chico from La Cuesta (now called Villanueva), 20 kilometres (12 miles) upstream on the Pecos River. However, Indian raids caused the abandonment of the settlement in 1827. Anton Chico was resettled in 1834, this time with success

Seven settlements grew along 12 kilometres (7.5 miles) of the Pecos River. From north to south (upstream to downstream) they were Tecolotito, Upper Anton Chico, Anton Chico, Llano Viejo, La Loma, Llano del Medio, Dilia, and Colonias. Anton Chico is the largest settlement of the seven. It was described in 1841-1842 as having a population of 200 to 300 people and built around a plaza designed for defense. The houses, surrounded by high walls, were described as follows:

"The little village of Anton Chico is built in a square, the houses fronting on the inner side, although there are strong doors, on the outer. The houses are of one story only, built of adobe...while the tops are flat. They have neither windows nor floors, and in point of comfort and convenience are only one degree removed from the modest wigwam of the Indian."

As one of the closest New Mexican settlements to the Great Plains with its bison herds and Plains Indians, many Ciboleros (bison hunters) and Comancheros (traders with the Plains Indians) originated from Anton Chico and other Hispano communities along the Pecos River in the 19th century.

Anton Chico achieved its maximum prominence about 1890 when it had a population of 900 people, all or nearly all Hispanic, and was a mercantile center for much of eastern New Mexico. Subsequently, with out-migration the population and economic activity declined. A factor in its decline was the re-routing of Route 66 which before 1937 crossed the Pecos River near Anton Chico. Subsequently, Anton Chico was distant from major transportation routes.

== Geography ==
According to the U.S. Census Bureau, the community has an area of 1.784 square miles (4.62 km^{2}), all land.

In 1958 tin roofs rather than adobe were on the majority of houses.

=== Climate ===
Anton Chico has a cold steppe climate (BSk) under the Köppen Classification of climates. Under the Trewartha climate classification the climate is a cold steppe with hot summers and cool winters (BSak). Most precipitation is received in the warmer six months of the year.

Climate data for Anton Chico, New Mexico, USA. 35.195 -105.144. Elevation: 5,353 feet (1,632 m).
Month	Jan	Feb	Mar	Apr	May	Jun	Jul	Aug	Sep	Oct	Nov	Dec	Year
Mean daily maximum °C (°F)	11.7 (53.0)	13.9 (57.0)	17.8 (64.0)	22.2 (72.0)	26.7 (80.0)	31.7 (89.0)	32.8 (91.0)	31.7 (89.0)	28.3 (83.0)	22.8 (73.0)	16.1 (61.0)	11.7 (53.0)	22.3 (72.1)
Daily mean °C (°F)	3.1 (37.5)	4.7 (40.5)	8.3 (47.0)	12.2 (54.0)	16.9 (62.5)	21.9 (71.5)	23.9 (75.0)	23.1 (73.5)	19.4 (67.0)	13.3 (56.0)	7.2 (45.0)	3.1 (37.5)	13.1 (55.6)
Mean daily minimum °C (°F)	−5.6 (22.0)	−4.4 (24.0)	−1.1 (30.0)	2.2 (36.0)	7.2 (45.0)	12.2 (54.0)	15.0 (59.0)	14.4 (58.0)	10.6 (51.0)	3.9 (39.0)	−1.7 (29.0)	−5.6 (22.0)	3.9 (39.1)
Average precipitation mm (inches)	15 (0.6)	13 (0.5)	18 (0.7)	20 (0.8)	33 (1.3)	41 (1.6)	66 (2.6)	66 (2.6)	48 (1.9)	30 (1.2)	18 (0.7)	20 (0.8)	390 (15.3)
Source: "Anton Chico, NM,"

== Demographics ==
Historical population
Census	Pop.	Note	%±
2020	161		—
U.S. Decennial Census

== National Register of Historic Places ==
In 1986, the village of Anton Chico was added to the National Register of Historic Places.

== Education ==
Its school district is Santa Rosa Consolidated Schools. It operates Rita M. Marquez Elementary School and Anton Chico Middle School in Anton Chico. Santa Rosa High School is the district's sole comprehensive high school.

Prior to 1973 the school district closed the junior high school in the Anton Chico area and began sending middle school students to Santa Rosa. This in turn made the Anton Chico residents upset at the school district. The West Las Vegas School District offered to have school bus transportation from Anton Chico to its schools and asked the State of New Mexico to pay for the transportation costs, but in 1973 the New Mexico State Board of Education denied the request to pay. In 1973 the Anton Chico elementary, which covered Kindergarten through grade 6, had 154 students.
