= Puerto de Luna, New Mexico =

Census-designated place in Guadalupe County, New Mexico, United States

- Census-designated place
- Location within New Mexico Location within the United States
- Coordinates: 34°49′49″N 104°37′43″W
- Country: United States
- State: New Mexico
- County: Guadalupe

Area
  - Total: 14.19 sq mi (36.75 km^{2})
  - Land: 14.19 sq mi (36.75 km^{2})
  - Water: 0 sq mi (0.00 km^{2})
- Elevation: 4,485 ft (1,367 m)

Population (2020)
  - Total: 155
  - Density: 10.9/sq mi (4.22/km^{2})
- Time zone: UTC-7 (Mountain)
  - Summer (DST): UTC-6 (DST)
- ZIP code: 88435
- Area code: 575
- FIPS code: 35-60170
- GNIS feature ID: 2584188

Puerto de Luna is a census-designated place (CDP) in Guadalupe County, New Mexico, United States. It lies approximately 9 1/2 miles (15.3 km) south-southeast of Santa Rosa on New Mexico State Road 91 and on the bank of the Pecos River. The community is located west of, but not within, the Llano Estacado of Eastern New Mexico and West Texas.

As of the 2020 census, Puerto de Luna had a population of 155.

== History ==
The site is reputed to have been visited by Francisco Vásquez de Coronado, who is believed to have camped here in 1541, on his way east in search of Quivira.

The first recorded permanent settlement was in 1863 when six Hispanic families built a dike on the Pecos to divert water for irrigation and began land cultivation. A post office was established in 1873. A notable settler was Padre Polaco, a.k.a. Alexander Grzelachowski, who originally came to New Mexico at age 27 with Archbishop Lamy and settled in Puerto de Luna in 1874, opening up the mercantile store. In 1891, he donated the land for the county courthouse. and the community became the county seat of Guadalupe County. The community was, however, overtaken by Santa Rosa when the railroad arrived there, and went into decline shortly after. The county seat was moved to Santa Rosa in 1903.

Billy the Kid reportedly ate his last Christmas Eve dinner here in 1880 while being transported to trial in Las Vegas in the custody of Pat Garrett.

The author Rudolfo Anaya references Puerto De Luna in his autobiographical novel Bless Me, Ultima.

The author Calvin Rutstrum bought, renovated and lived in a house here in the 1960s. His book Greenhorns in the Southwest (University of New Mexico Press, 1972) is a semi-autobiographical account of that period.

The roofless shell of the county courthouse remains the largest edifice.

== Etymology ==
A legendary etymology is that Coronado gave the name to the spot where he camped, having seen the rising full moon through a narrow gap in the hills east of the site (English: Gateway of the Moon).

An alternative, more practical name origin refers to the Luna family, who lived at the mouth of Puerto Creek in the 1860s.

Local residents often refer casually to the community as "PDL".

== Demographics ==
Historical population
| Census | Pop. | Note | %± |
|---|---|---|---|
| 2020 | 155 | | — |
U.S. Decennial Census

== Education ==
Its school district is Santa Rosa Consolidated Schools.

== See also ==
- List of census-designated places in New Mexico
