= Guadalupe County, New Mexico =

County in New Mexico, United States

- County
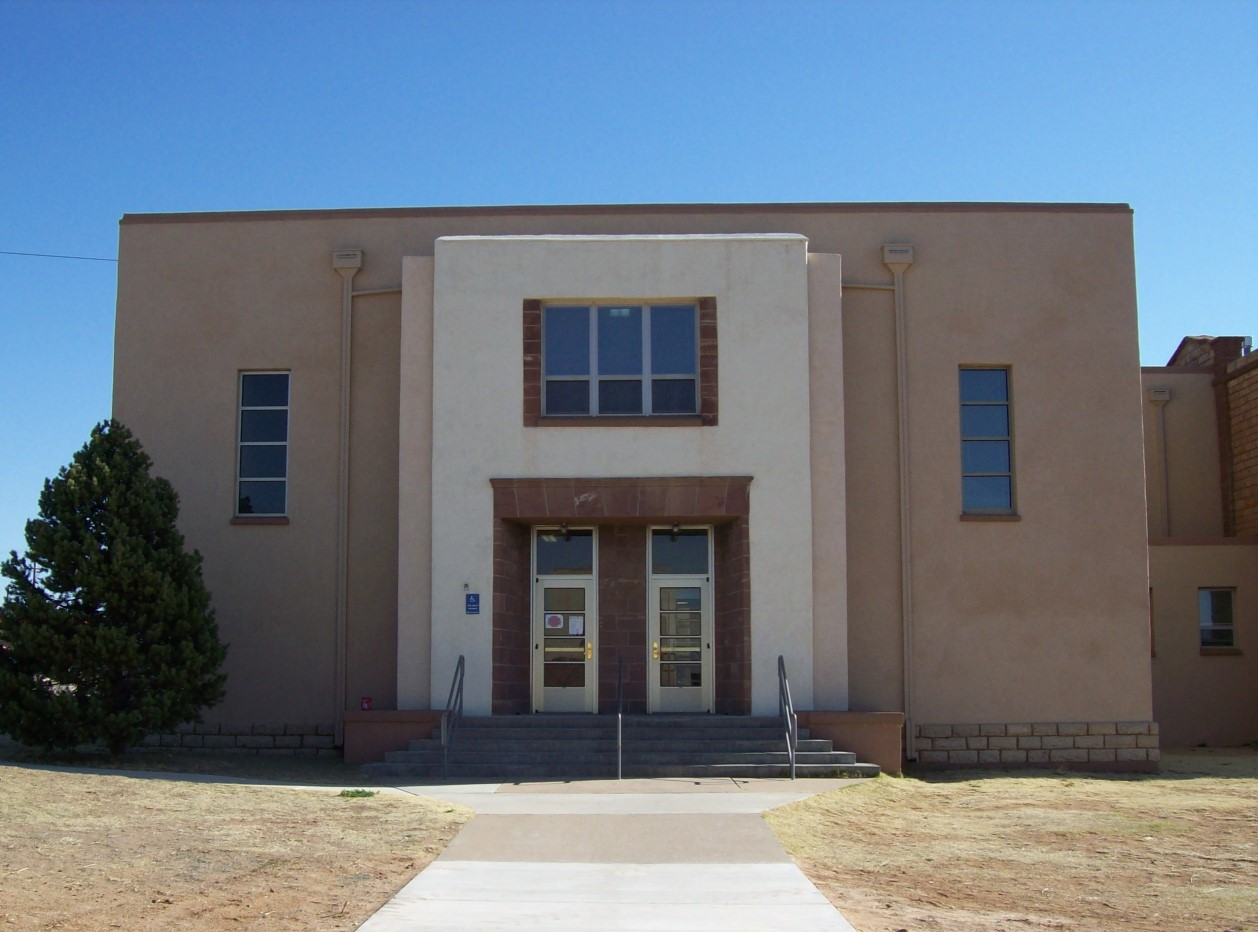
- Guadalupe County Courthouse in Santa Rosa

- Location within the U.S. state of New Mexico
- Coordinates: 34°52′N 104°47′W
- Country: United States
- State: New Mexico
- Founded: February 26, 1891
- Named for: Our Lady of Guadalupe
- Seat: Santa Rosa
- Largest city: Santa Rosa

Area
  - Total: 3,032 sq mi (7,850 km^{2})
  - Land: 3,030 sq mi (7,800 km^{2})
  - Water: 1.1 sq mi (2.8 km^{2}) 0.04%

Population (2020)
  - Total: 4,452
  - Estimate (2025): 4,343 ▼
  - Density: 1.47/sq mi (0.567/km^{2})
- Time zone: UTC−7 (Mountain)
  - Summer (DST): UTC−6 (MDT)
- Congressional district: 2nd
- Website: https://www.guadalupecountynm.org/

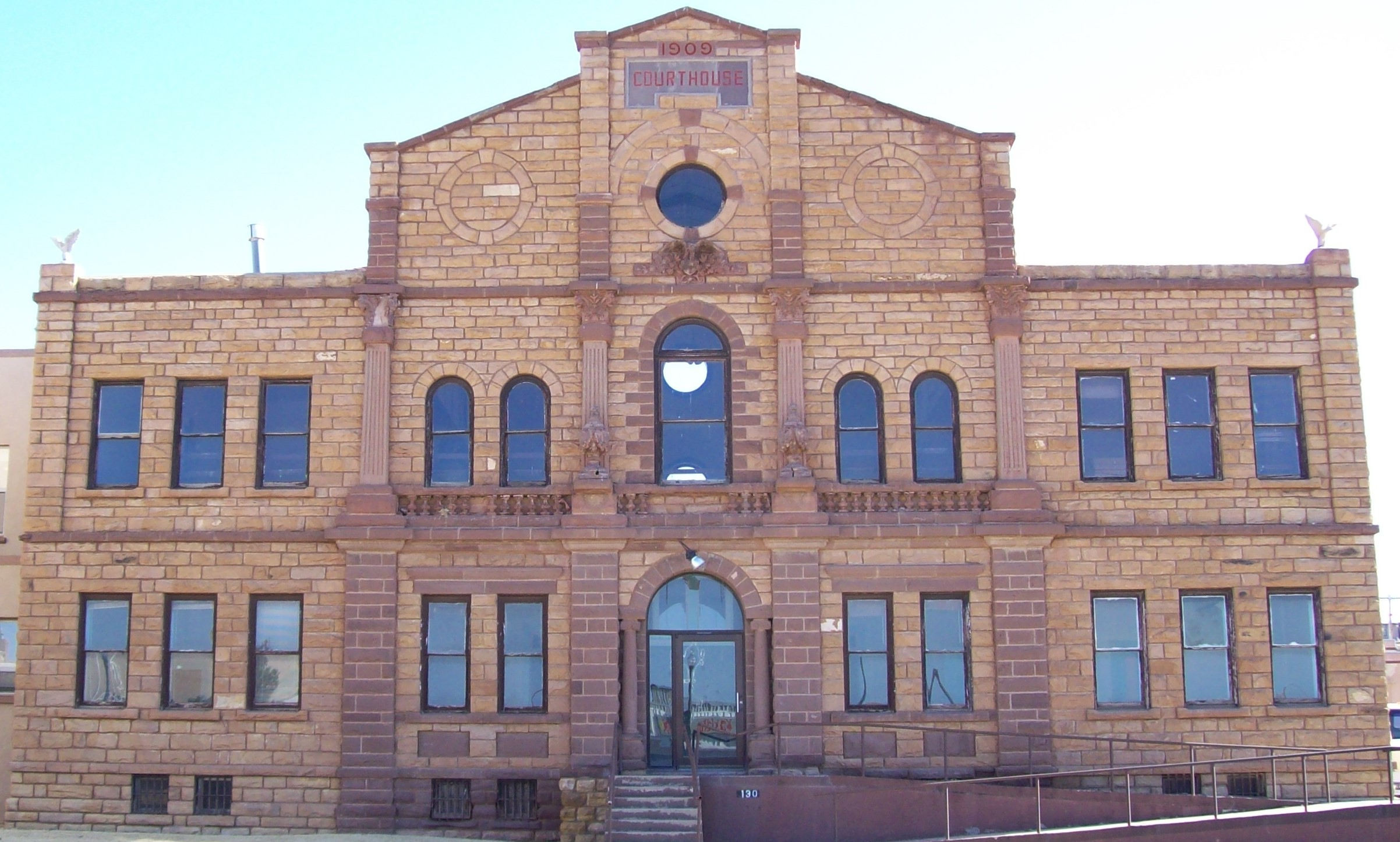
The older section of Guadalupe County Courthouse, which was built in 1909, adjoins the newer section.

Guadalupe County (Spanish: Condado de Guadalupe) is a county in the U.S. state of New Mexico. As of the 2020 census, the population was 4,452. Its county seat is Santa Rosa.

== History ==
Guadalupe County was named after Nuestra Señora de Guadalupe (Our Lady of Guadalupe) or after the Mesita de Guadalupe (Guadalupe Plain). The county was created from the southern portion of San Miguel County February 26, 1891, by an act of the New Mexico Territorial Legislature. The original county seat was Puerto De Luna, but was moved north to Santa Rosa in 1903. That same year, after the popular Spanish–American War of 1898, the county's name was changed to Leonard Wood County after the Presidential physician, Major-General in the Rough Riders, and recipient of the Medal of Honor. The name was later changed back to Guadalupe County. The County contains whole, or parts of, several previous Spanish land grants to include the Aqua Negra, the Jose Perea, the Anton Chico, and the Preston Beck land grants.

== Geography ==
According to the U.S. Census Bureau, the county has a total area of 3,032 square miles (7,850 km^{2}), of which 3,030 square miles (7,800 km^{2}) is land and 1.1 square miles (2.8 km^{2}) (0.04%) is water.

=== Adjacent counties ===
- San Miguel County – north
- Quay County – east
- De Baca County – south
- Lincoln County – south
- Torrance County – west

== Demographics ==
Historical population
Census	Pop.	Note	%±
1900	5,429		—
1910	10,927		101.3%
1920	8,015		−26.6%
1930	7,027		−12.3%
1940	8,646		23.0%
1950	6,772		−21.7%
1960	5,610		−17.2%
1970	4,969		−11.4%
1980	4,496		−9.5%
1990	4,156		−7.6%
2000	4,680		12.6%
2010	4,687		0.1%
2020	4,452		−5.0%
2025 (est.)	4,343	▼	−2.4%
U.S. Decennial Census; 1790–1960 1900–1990; 1990–2000 2010

=== 2020 census ===
As of the 2020 census, the county had a population of 4,452. The median age was 42.0 years. 19.5% of residents were under the age of 18 and 19.2% of residents were 65 years of age or older. For every 100 females there were 130.2 males, and for every 100 females age 18 and over there were 132.3 males age 18 and over.

Guadalupe County, New Mexico – Racial and ethnic composition Note: the US Census treats Hispanic/Latino as an ethnic category. This table excludes Latinos from the racial categories and assigns them to a separate category. Hispanics/Latinos may be of any race.
Race / Ethnicity (NH = Non-Hispanic)	Pop 2000	Pop 2010	Pop 2020	% 2000	% 2010	% 2020
White alone (NH)	724	753	769	15.47%	16.07%	17.27%
Black or African American alone (NH)	59	66	64	1.26%	1.41%	1.44%
Native American or Alaska Native alone (NH)	33	46	40	0.71%	0.98%	0.90%
Asian alone (NH)	24	58	49	0.51%	1.24%	1.10%
Pacific Islander alone (NH)	1	0	0	0.02%	0.00%	0.00%
Other race alone (NH)	5	4	21	0.11%	0.09%	0.47%
Mixed race or Multiracial (NH)	33	30	73	0.71%	0.64%	1.64%
Hispanic or Latino (any race)	3,801	3,730	3,436	81.22%	79.58%	77.18%
Total	4,680	4,687	4,452	100.00%	100.00%	100.00%

The racial makeup of the county was 46.4% White, 1.7% Black or African American, 1.4% American Indian and Alaska Native, 1.1% Asian, 0.0% Native Hawaiian and Pacific Islander, 18.9% from some other race, and 30.5% from two or more races. Hispanic or Latino residents of any race comprised 77.2% of the population.

0.0% of residents lived in urban areas, while 100.0% lived in rural areas.

There were 1,659 households in the county, of which 29.2% had children under the age of 18 living with them and 30.5% had a female householder with no spouse or partner present. About 33.4% of all households were made up of individuals and 16.0% had someone living alone who was 65 years of age or older.

There were 2,187 housing units, of which 24.1% were vacant. Among occupied housing units, 65.8% were owner-occupied and 34.2% were renter-occupied. The homeowner vacancy rate was 1.6% and the rental vacancy rate was 11.0%.

=== 2010 census ===
As of the 2010 census, there were 4,687 people, 1,766 households, and 1,114 families living in the county. The population density was 1.5 inhabitants per square mile (0.58 inhabitants/km^{2}). There were 2,393 housing units at an average density of 0.8 units per square mile (0.31 units/km^{2}). The racial makeup of the county was 70.4% white, 1.9% American Indian, 1.7% black or African American, 1.3% Asian, 21.4% from other races, and 3.3% from two or more races. Those of Hispanic or Latino origin made up 79.6% of the population. In terms of ancestry, 8.3% were German, and 2.4% were American.

Of the 1,766 households, 30.6% had children under the age of 18 living with them, 40.9% were married couples living together, 15.2% had a female householder with no husband present, 36.9% were non-families, and 32.4% of all households were made up of individuals. The average household size was 2.33 and the average family size was 2.93. The median age was 40.1 years.

The median income for a household in the county was $28,488 and the median income for a family was $37,535. Males had a median income of $36,494 versus $23,984 for females. The per capita income for the county was $13,710. About 21.7% of families and 28.2% of the population were below the poverty line, including 46.7% of those under age 18 and 27.4% of those age 65 or over.

=== 2000 census ===
As of the 2000 census, there were 4,680 people, 1,655 households, and 1,145 families living in the county. The population density was 2 people per square mile (0.77 people/km^{2}). There were 2,160 housing units at an average density of 1 units per square mile (0.39/km^{2}). The racial makeup of the county was 54.1% White, 1.3% Black or African American, 1.1% Native American, 0.5% Asian, nil% Pacific Islander, 39.1% from other races, and 3.6% from two or more races. 81.2% of the population were Hispanic or Latino of any race.

There were 1,655 households, out of which 33.8% had children under the age of 18 living with them, 49.5% were married couples living together, 14.3% had a female householder with no husband present, and 30.8% were non-families. 27.9% of all households were made up of individuals, and 11.5% had someone living alone who was 65 years of age or older. The average household size was 2.51 and the average family size was 3.05.

In the county, the population was spread out, with 24.4% under the age of 18, 9.2% from 18 to 24, 30.7% from 25 to 44, 21.9% from 45 to 64, and 13.8% who were 65 years of age or older. The median age was 38 years. For every 100 females there were 121.5 males. For every 100 females age 18 and over, there were 126.3 males.

The median income for a household in the county was $24,783, and the median income for a family was $28,279. Males had a median income of $22,463 versus $18,500 for females. The per capita income for the county was $11,241. About 18.1% of families and 21.60% of the population were below the poverty line, including 24.1% of those under age 18 and 19.4% of those age 65 or over.

== Communities ==
=== City ===
- Santa Rosa (county seat)

=== Town ===
- Vaughn

=== Census-designated places ===
- Anton Chico
- Llano del Medio
- Newkirk
- Pastura
- Puerto de Luna

=== Unincorporated communities ===
- Colonias
- Cuervo

== Politics ==
Guadalupe County leans Democratic, and has voted for the Democratic nominee in every presidential election since 1988. In 2024, however, Guadalupe County saw a trend toward the Republican Party in line with majority-Hispanic counties nationally when Donald Trump came within less than 1% of flipping it, with Kamala Harris holding it by a plurality and winning by only 14 votes. This was the best performance for a Republican in the county since Reagan won it in 1984.

United States presidential election results for Guadalupe County, New Mexico
Year	Republican		Democratic		Third party(ies)	
Year	No.	%	No.	%	No.	%
1912	651	39.17%	761	45.79%	250	15.04%
1916	1,067	46.90%	1,172	51.52%	36	1.58%
1920	1,599	56.30%	1,224	43.10%	17	0.60%
1924	1,329	51.83%	1,056	41.19%	179	6.98%
1928	1,718	61.12%	1,093	38.88%	0	0.00%
1932	1,621	45.77%	1,909	53.90%	12	0.34%
1936	1,775	44.76%	2,187	55.14%	4	0.10%
1940	1,807	46.46%	2,082	53.54%	0	0.00%
1944	1,649	51.73%	1,539	48.27%	0	0.00%
1948	1,565	50.24%	1,550	49.76%	0	0.00%
1952	1,575	53.90%	1,347	46.10%	0	0.00%
1956	1,529	56.15%	1,191	43.74%	3	0.11%
1960	1,242	43.82%	1,589	56.07%	3	0.11%
1964	1,058	39.00%	1,649	60.78%	6	0.22%
1968	1,176	51.42%	1,027	44.91%	84	3.67%
1972	1,297	51.37%	1,202	47.60%	26	1.03%
1976	1,047	42.68%	1,379	56.22%	27	1.10%
1980	1,065	49.65%	980	45.69%	100	4.66%
1984	990	50.36%	946	48.12%	30	1.53%
1988	861	40.63%	1,243	58.66%	15	0.71%
1992	691	32.87%	1,225	58.28%	186	8.85%
1996	436	25.12%	1,208	69.59%	92	5.30%
2000	548	33.19%	1,076	65.17%	27	1.64%
2004	914	40.32%	1,340	59.11%	13	0.57%
2008	620	28.23%	1,557	70.90%	19	0.87%
2012	557	26.09%	1,488	69.70%	90	4.22%
2016	595	32.57%	970	53.09%	262	14.34%
2020	917	41.89%	1,234	56.37%	38	1.74%
2024	945	48.76%	959	49.48%	34	1.75%

== Education ==
The county has two school districts serving sections: Santa Rosa Consolidated Schools and Vaughn Municipal Schools.

== Transportation ==
=== Major highways ===
- I-40
  - I-40 BL (Santa Rosa)
- US 54
- US 60
- US 84
- US 285
- NM 91
- NM 119
- NM 129
- NM 156
- NM 219
- NM 386
- NM 451

== See also ==
- National Register of Historic Places listings in Guadalupe County, New Mexico
