= Santa Rosa, New Mexico =

- City
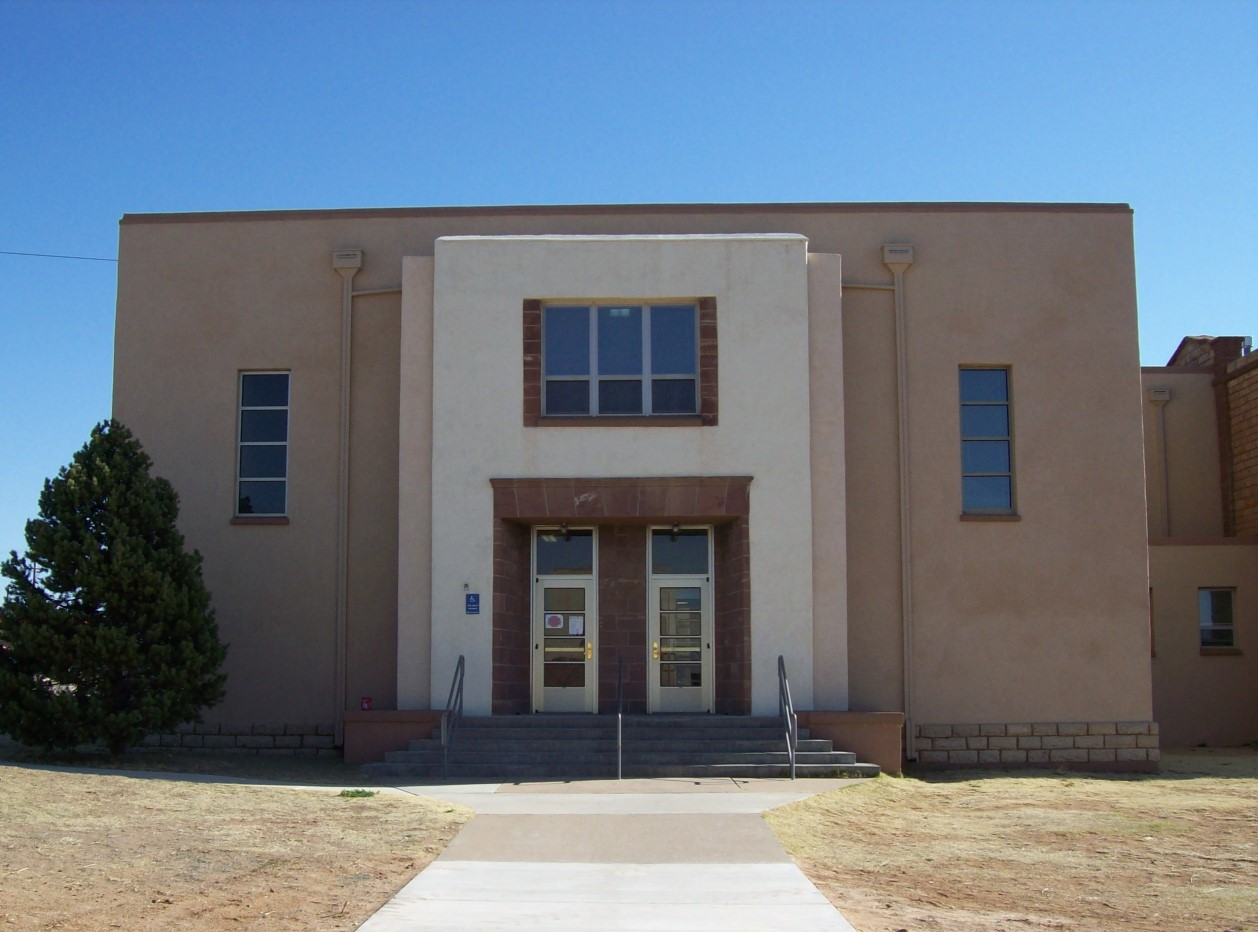
- New wing, Guadalupe County Courthouse

- Location of Santa Rosa, New Mexico

- Location in the United States
- Coordinates: 34°56′10″N 104°40′37″W
- Country: United States
- State: New Mexico
- County: Guadalupe
- Named for: Rose of Lima

Government
  - Mayor: Nelson Kotiar

Area
  - Total: 5.02 sq mi (13.01 km^{2})
  - Land: 5.00 sq mi (12.95 km^{2})
  - Water: 0.023 sq mi (0.06 km^{2})
- Elevation: 4,567 ft (1,392 m)

Population (2020)
  - Total: 2,850
  - Density: 570.1/sq mi (220.13/km^{2})
- Time zone: UTC-7 (Mountain (MST))
  - Summer (DST): UTC-6 (MDT)
- ZIP code: 88435
- Area code: 575
- FIPS code: 35-70670
- GNIS feature ID: 2411828
- Website: santarosanm.gov

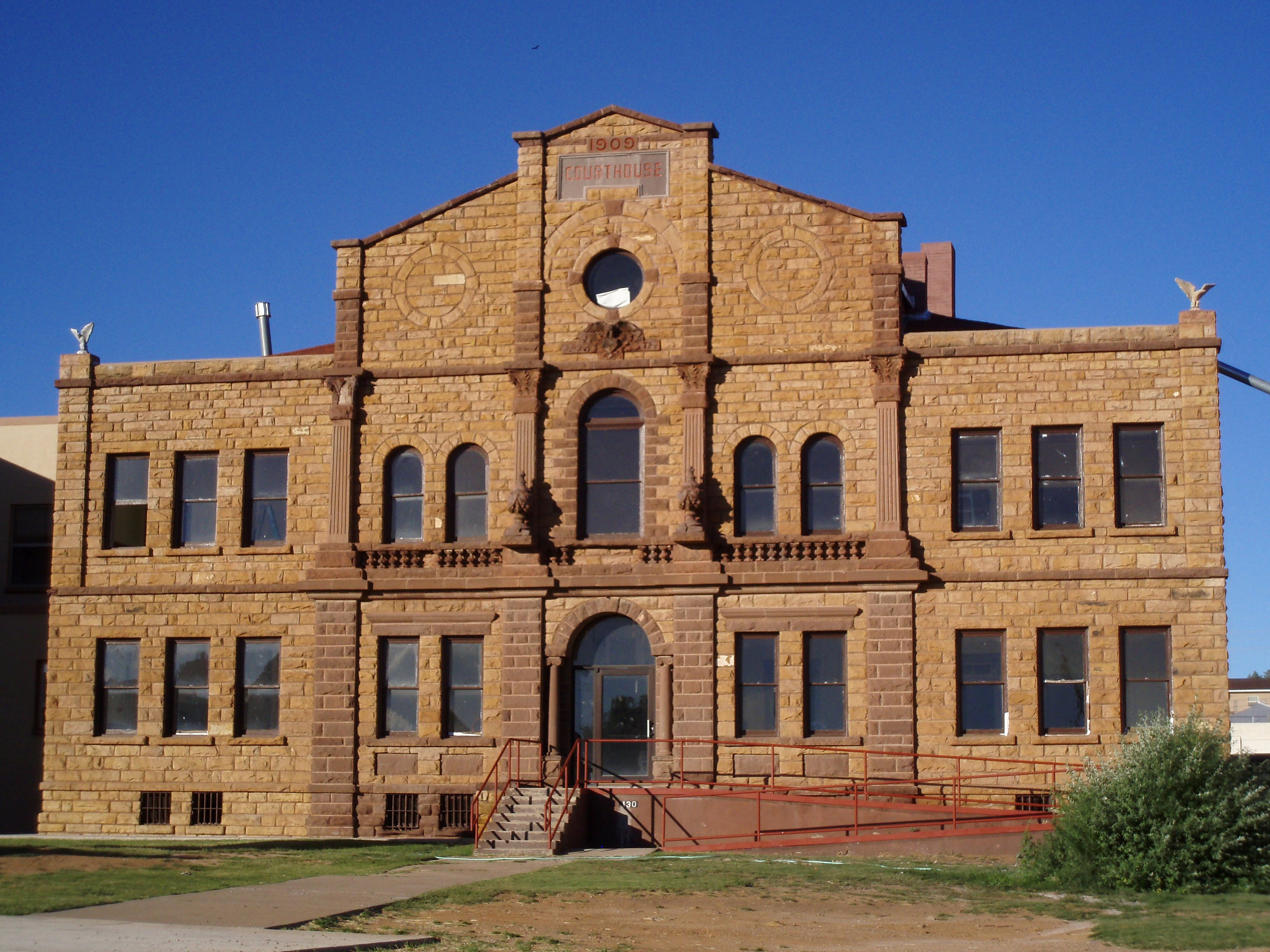
The historic Guadalupe County courthouse in Santa Rosa was built in 1909. New wing visible at left.

Santa Rosa is a city in and the county seat of Guadalupe County, New Mexico, United States. As of the 2020 census, Santa Rosa had a population of 2,850. It lies between Albuquerque and Tucumcari, situated on the Pecos River at the intersection of Interstate 40 (I-40), U.S. Route 54 (US 54), and U.S. Route 84 (US 84). The city is located on the western edge of the Llano Estacado or "staked plains" of eastern New Mexico and western Texas.

== History ==
The first Euro-American settlement in the area was Agua Negra Chiquita, "Little Black Water" in Spanish, in 1865. The name was changed in 1890 to Santa Rosa (Spanish for "Saint Rose"), referring to a chapel that Don Celso Baca (the founder of the city) built and named after both his mother Rosa and Saint Rose of Lima. The "Rosa" may also refer to the roses in the story of Our Lady of Guadalupe and is indicative of the Catholicism of the Spanish colonizers who settled in the area.

At the turn of the 20th century, Santa Rosa was not the largest settlement within the region. Puerto de Luna, approximately ten miles south, held the county seat for Guadalupe County. Santa Rosa was smaller than Puerto de Luna until 1901 when the Chicago, Rock Island & Pacific Railroad was extended into Santa Rosa from the east, quickly followed by arrival of the El Paso and Northeastern Railway in February 1902, from the southwest, thereby creating a transcontinental connection. As the terminus and interchange point of the two railroads, a thriving community quickly developed (The interchange was moved to Tucumcari after 1907). The county seat was moved to Santa Rosa from Puerto de Luna in 1903.

The east–west highway through the town was designated as US 66 in 1926, and the increase in traffic made the community a popular rest stop with motels and cafes. Santa Rosa's stretch of Route 66 is part of film history.

Santa Rosa was the childhood home of author Rudolfo Anaya, and is the basis for the fictional town of Guadalupe in his autobiographical novel Bless Me, Ultima.

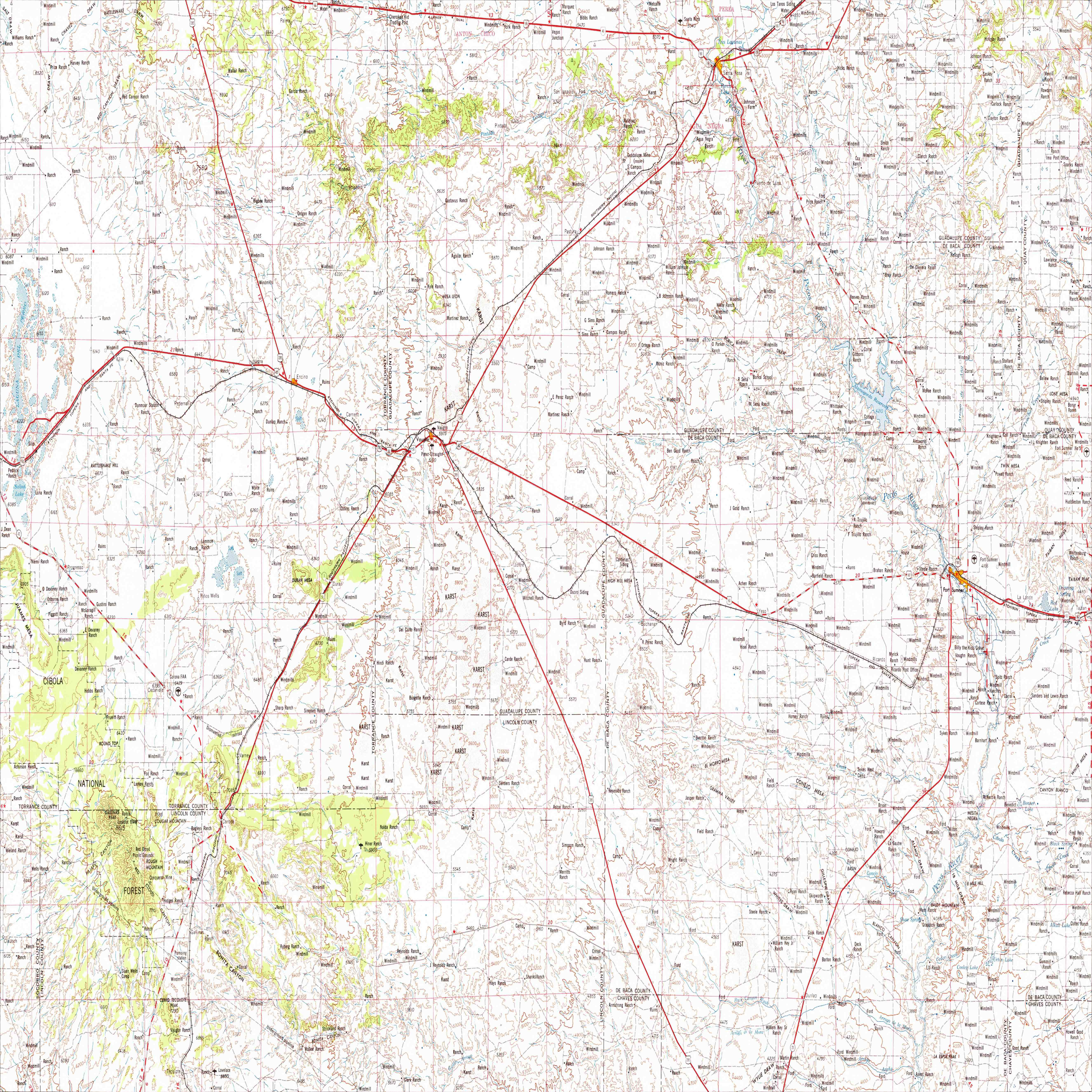
Santa Rosa and other towns such as Vaughn and Fort Sumner in 1954.

== Geography ==
Santa Rosa has many natural lakes, an anomaly in the dry desert climate surrounding it. These are sinkholes that form in the limestone bedrock of the area and fill with water, and thus the lakes are connected by a network of underground, water-filled tunnels. The most famous of these is Blue Hole, a popular spot for diving, where cool 61 °F (16 °C) water forms a lake over 81 feet (25 m) deep.

Santa Rosa is located near the center of Guadalupe County at 34°56′32″N 104°41′2″W (34.942166, -104.683981).

According to the United States Census Bureau, the city has a total area of 5.0 square miles (12.9 km^{2}), of which 0.03 square miles (0.07 km^{2}), or 0.52%, is water.

=== Climate ===
Santa Rosa experiences a semi-arid climate (Köppen climate classification BSk).

Climate data for Santa Rosa, New Mexico
Month	Jan	Feb	Mar	Apr	May	Jun	Jul	Aug	Sep	Oct	Nov	Dec	Year
Mean daily maximum °F (°C)	53.5 (11.9)	58.2 (14.6)	64.9 (18.3)	73.6 (23.1)	81.6 (27.6)	90.4 (32.4)	91.9 (33.3)	90.0 (32.2)	84.3 (29.1)	74.9 (23.8)	62.6 (17.0)	54.3 (12.4)	73.3 (22.9)
Mean daily minimum °F (°C)	24.8 (−4.0)	27.5 (−2.5)	32.7 (0.4)	40.5 (4.7)	49.3 (9.6)	58.1 (14.5)	62.7 (17.1)	61.2 (16.2)	53.8 (12.1)	42.5 (5.8)	31.7 (−0.2)	25.7 (−3.5)	42.5 (5.8)
Average precipitation inches (mm)	0.39 (9.9)	0.44 (11)	0.64 (16)	0.80 (20)	1.54 (39)	1.56 (40)	2.31 (59)	2.60 (66)	1.64 (42)	1.26 (32)	0.52 (13)	0.60 (15)	14.31 (363)
Average snowfall inches (cm)	2.9 (7.4)	2.5 (6.4)	1.0 (2.5)	0.6 (1.5)	0.1 (0.25)	0.0 (0.0)	0.0 (0.0)	0.0 (0.0)	0.0 (0.0)	0.3 (0.76)	1.3 (3.3)	4.0 (10)	12.6 (32)
Source: WRCC

== Transport ==
Highways

Interstate 40 serves the city with three exits (273, 275, and 277); the highway leads east 59 miles (95 km) to Tucumcari and west 115 miles (185 km) to Albuquerque. U.S. Route 84 leads southeast 44 miles (71 km) to Fort Sumner, and U.S. Route 54 leads southwest 40 miles (64 km) to Vaughn.

"Route 66" remains the name of the main east–west thoroughfare through the city, referring to former US 66, which lost its official designation in 1985.

New Mexico State Road 91 runs south to Puerto de Luna.

Railroad

Union Pacific provides freight service. No passenger service has been available since 1968.

Airport

Santa Rosa Route 66 Airport is located east of the city. Currently there is no scheduled passenger service.

== Demographics ==
Historical population
Census	Pop.	Note	%±
1920	1,093		—
1930	1,127		3.1%
1940	2,310		105.0%
1950	2,199		−4.8%
1960	2,220		1.0%
1970	2,485		11.9%
1980	2,469		−0.6%
1990	2,263		−8.3%
2000	2,744		21.3%
2010	2,848		3.8%
2020	2,850		0.1%
U.S. Decennial Census

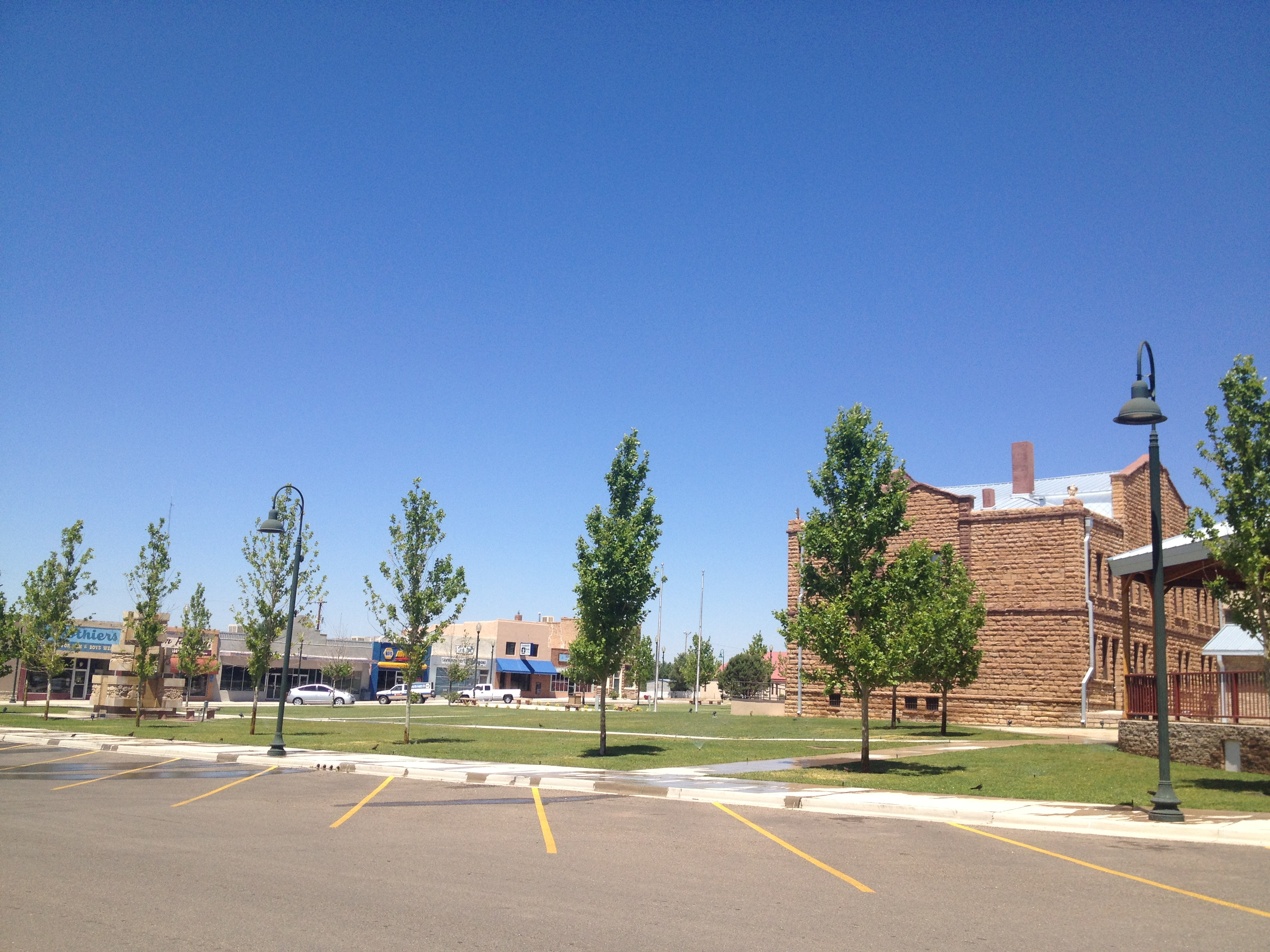
Downtown Santa Rosa

=== 2020 census ===
As of the 2020 census, Santa Rosa had a population of 2,850. The median age was 39.6 years. 18.5% of residents were under the age of 18 and 15.9% of residents were 65 years of age or older. For every 100 females there were 148.0 males, and for every 100 females age 18 and over there were 155.3 males age 18 and over.

0.0% of residents lived in urban areas, while 100.0% lived in rural areas.

There were 980 households in Santa Rosa, of which 29.9% had children under the age of 18 living in them. Of all households, 31.6% were married-couple households, 24.7% were households with a male householder and no spouse or partner present, and 33.2% were households with a female householder and no spouse or partner present. About 36.1% of all households were made up of individuals and 16.5% had someone living alone who was 65 years of age or older.

There were 1,230 housing units, of which 20.3% were vacant. The homeowner vacancy rate was 1.2% and the rental vacancy rate was 12.3%.

Racial composition as of the 2020 census
Race	Number	Percent
White	1,265	44.4%
Black or African American	61	2.1%
American Indian and Alaska Native	52	1.8%
Asian	46	1.6%
Native Hawaiian and Other Pacific Islander	0	0.0%
Some other race	519	18.2%
Two or more races	907	31.8%
Hispanic or Latino (of any race)	2,275	79.8%

=== 2000 census ===
As of the census of 2000, there were 2,744 people, 898 households, and 616 families residing in the city. The population density was 645.7 inhabitants per square mile (249.3/km^{2}). There were 1,024 housing units at an average density of 241.0 units per square mile (93.1 units/km^{2}). The racial makeup of the city was 57.47% White, 2.19% African American, 1.75% Native American, 0.87% Asian, 0.04% Pacific Islander, 33.13% from other races, and 4.56% from two or more races. Hispanic or Latino of any race were 81.16% of the population.

There were 898 households, out of which 35.0% had children under the age of 18 living with them, 45.1% were married couples living together, 18.3% had a female householder with no husband present, and 31.3% were non-families. 28.0% of all households were made up of individuals, and 11.2% had someone living alone who was 65 years of age or older. The average household size was 2.50 and the average family size was 3.03.

In the city, the population was spread out, with 23.1% under the age of 18, 10.4% from 18 to 24, 34.4% from 25 to 44, 20.0% from 45 to 64, and 12.0% who were 65 years of age or older. The median age was 36 years. For every 100 females, there were 135.1 males. For every 100 females age 18 and over, there were 145.2 males.

The median income for a household in the city was $25,085, and the median income for a family was $28,782. Males had a median income of $20,161 versus $16,417 for females. The per capita income for the city was $11,168. About 18.9% of families and 23.2% of the population were below the poverty line, including 27.5% of those under age 18 and 23.9% of those age 65 or over.

== Education ==
Its school district is Santa Rosa Consolidated Schools. It operates Santa Rosa Elementary School, Santa Rosa Middle School, and Santa Rosa High School.

== Sports ==
Santa Rosa High School's football team won back-to-back-to-back state championships in the 2010, 2011, and 2012 AA state championships. The 2010 and 2011 victories were won against teams which were undefeated until the championship. In 2010 the Santa Rosa Lions beat the Tularosa Wildcats, and in 2011 the Santa Rosa Lions beat the Eunice Cardinals. In 2012, the Santa Rosa Lions went undefeated, shutting out the Tularosa Wildcats in the championship. The Lions also won championships in 1955, 1993, 1996, 1998, and 2007. Santa Rosa High School was also among the first in the country to establish a lawn mower racing club.

== In popular media ==
When John Steinbeck's epic novel, The Grapes of Wrath, was made into a movie, director John Ford used Santa Rosa for the memorable train scene. Tom Joad (Henry Fonda) watches a freight train steam over the Pecos River railroad bridge, into the sunset. It was also one of the shooting scenes for Bobbie Jo and the Outlaw starring Lynda Carter in the role of Bobbi Jo.

== Notable people ==
- Rudolfo Anaya, author known for Bless Me, Ultima
- Charles E. Barnhart, attorney and politician
- Dave Campos, motorcycle racer
- Joe A. Campos, former member of the New Mexico House of Representatives
- Santiago E. Campos, attorney and jurist
- George Dodge, former member of the New Mexico House of Representatives
- Miguel Marquez, national correspondent for CNN
- Lucy Scarbrough, noted pianist, conductor and educator
