= U.S. Route 60 =

Numbered U.S. Highway in the United States

U.S. Route 60
- US 60 highlighted in red

Route information
- Length: 2,655 mi (4,273 km)
- Existed: November 11, 1926–present

Major junctions
- West end: I-10 near Brenda, AZ
- I-10 / I-17 in Phoenix, AZ; I-25 / US 85 in Socorro, NM; I-27 / I-40 / US 87 / US 287 in Amarillo, TX; I-35 at Tonkawa, OK; I-55 / I-57 in Sikeston, MO; I-65 in Louisville, KY; I-75 in Lexington, KY; I-64 / I-77 in Charleston, WV; I-81 southeast of Lexington, VA; I-64 in Hampton and Norfolk, VA
- East end: Harbour Point/Rudee Point Rd. in Virginia Beach, VA

Location
- Country: United States
- States: Arizona, New Mexico, Texas, Oklahoma, Missouri, Illinois, Kentucky, West Virginia, Virginia

Highway system
- United States Numbered Highway System; List; Special; Divided
← US 59	US	→ US 61
← Route 59	MO	→ US 61
← WV 59	WV	→ WV 61

U.S. Route 60 is a major east–west United States highway, traveling 2,655 miles (4,273 km) from southwestern Arizona to the Atlantic Ocean coast in Virginia. The highway's eastern terminus is in Virginia Beach, Virginia, where it is known as General Booth Boulevard, just south of the city's Oceanfront resort district at the intersection of Rudee Point Road and Harbor Point. Its original western terminus was in Springfield, Missouri; it was then extended to Los Angeles, California, but in 1964, it was truncated to end southwest of Brenda, Arizona, at an interchange with Interstate 10 (I-10) after the US 60 highway designation was removed from California. I-10 replaced US 60 from Beaumont, California, to Arizona, and California State Route 60 (SR 60) replaced US 60 from Los Angeles to Beaumont.

== Route description ==
Lengths
	mi	km
AZ	368	592
NM	366	590
TX	225	362
OK	355	571
MO	341	549
IL	0.9	1.5
KY	489	787
WV	179	288
VA	302	486
Total	2,655	4,273

=== Arizona ===
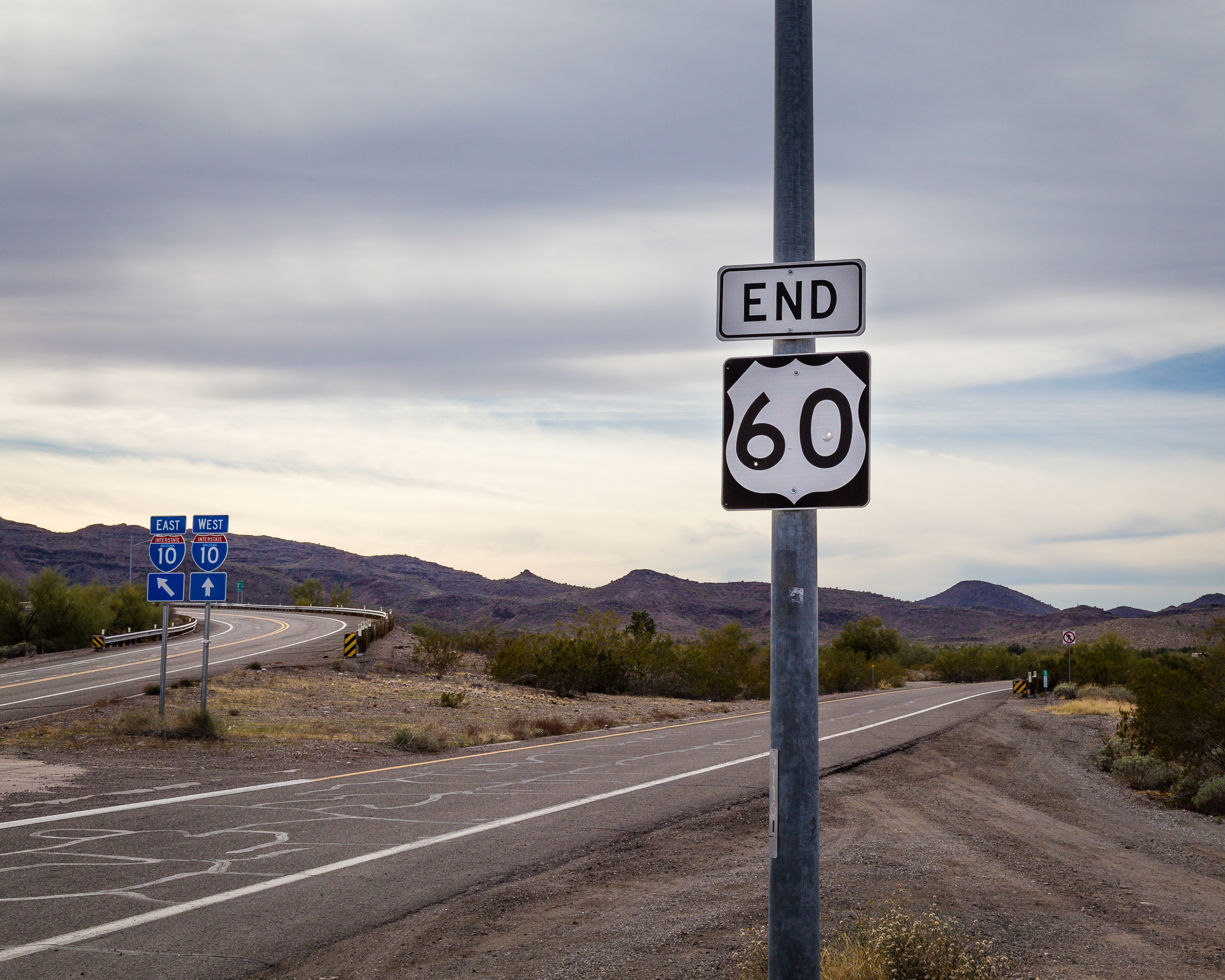
Western terminus at I-10 west of Brenda, AZ

The westernmost stretch of US 60, to the California state line, has been replaced by Interstate 10 (I-10). The western terminus of US 60 is near Brenda, from where it travels northeast to Wickenburg. Once US 60 enters Surprise, it carries the name Grand Avenue through the Phoenix metropolitan area before joining I-17 and I-10 in Phoenix for approximately 14 miles (23 km). In Tempe, US 60 exits I-10 and becomes the Superstition Freeway, a significant part of the Phoenix freeway system that serves cities such as Mesa, Gilbert, and Apache Junction. East of the Phoenix area, US 60 bears roughly east-northeast through mountainous areas, passing through Globe, Show Low, and Springerville before entering New Mexico.

=== New Mexico ===
US 60 enters New Mexico in Catron County east of Springerville, Arizona. The road makes an arc through Catron County, with the apex at Quemado, avoiding Apache-Sitgreaves National Forest and Escondido Mountain. East of Pie Town, the road crosses the Continental Divide. Between the Divide and Datil, US 60 cuts through the Datil Mountains and Cibola National Forest. In Datil, US 60 serves as the eastern terminus of NM-12.

East of Datil, US 60 traverses the northern end of the Plains of San Augustin, then crosses the county line into Socorro County. The road bisects the Very Large Array complex, and a track used in rearranging the antennas that make up the Array crosses the highway. 36 mi (58 km) into the county, the highway passes through Magdalena.

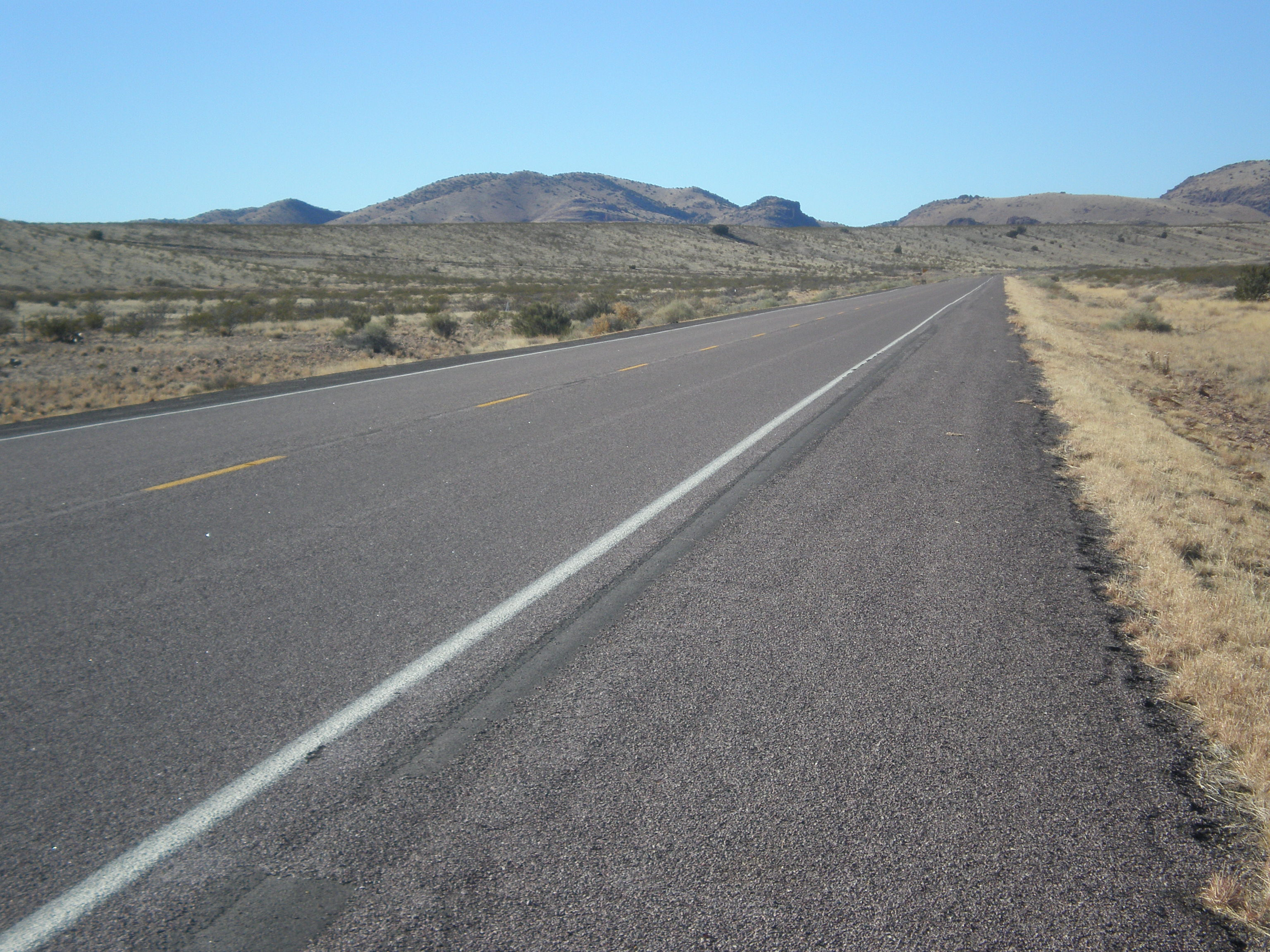
US 60 looking west, west of Socorro, NM

It then enters the county seat of Socorro, where it meets Interstate 25. US 60 heads north, beginning a concurrency with the Interstate.

US 60 splits off from I-25 near Bernardo, about 25 mi (40 km) north of Socorro. It turns back eastward, rising through Abo Pass at the southern end of the Manzano Mountains before crossing into Torrance County and passing through Mountainair, where it intersects NM-55. After passing through Willard, it sets out across the Pedernal Hills. In Encino, it begins a concurrency with US-285. Just after crossing into Guadalupe County, US-54 joins the concurrency. The three highways pass through Vaughn and then go their separate ways, with US 285 heading southeast towards the direction of Roswell, US 54 heading northeast towards both Santa Rosa and Interstate 40, and US 60 heading east towards Clovis.

US 60 angles southeast toward Yeso, entering De Baca County en route. Curving back towards the east, the road enters Fort Sumner, the county seat, 21 mi (34 km) later. Just west of town, it serves as the northern terminus of NM-20, and in Fort Sumner proper, it begins a concurrency with US-84, which will persist for the remainder of the routes' miles in New Mexico. East of town the two highways encounter NM-212, a spur to Fort Sumner State Monument, and NM 252 in Taiban.

US 60/84 passes through Tolar near the De Baca–Roosevelt County line. The two routes do not stay in Roosevelt County for long, however, proceeding into Curry County west of Melrose. The highways pass through Melrose, St. Vrain, and Grier before widening out to a four-lane highway as they approach Clovis, the Curry County seat. In Clovis, the home of Cannon Air Force Base, the highways meet up with US-70, which joins the concurrency. The three highways proceed through Texico, and then cross the state line near Farwell, Texas.

For the distance of more than 300 miles (480 km) between Abo Pass and Amarillo, the highway parallels the Southern Transcon, one of the busiest transcontinental railroads in the west.

=== Texas ===
US 60 runs in a northeasterly direction across the Texas Panhandle. It enters the state as a four-lane divided highway at Farwell on the Texas-New Mexico border, and heads northeast, intersecting U.S. Route 385 at Hereford. At Canyon, the route begins a concurrency with both U.S. Route 87 and Interstate 27; the three routes are united to Amarillo.

At Amarillo, the road crosses Interstate 40 and has a short concurrency with Historic US 66 on Amarillo Boulevard. The road continues as a divided highway, heading northeast to Pampa, where the road goes to two lanes. At Canadian, the route briefly returns to four-lane status and forms a concurrency with U.S. Route 83. US 60 leaves Texas for Oklahoma 2 mi (3.2 km) east of Higgins.

=== Oklahoma ===
Except for three short sections near Enid, Vinita, and Ponca City, US 60 is a two-lane highway its entire length across Oklahoma. It enters the state 14 mi (23 km) west of Arnett and travels east to Orienta where it begins a concurrency with U.S. Highway 412. At Enid, it leaves the concurrency with US-412 and begins another with U.S. Highway 64 with which it is united for 24 miles (39 km). Near Tonkawa, US 60 has an interchange with Interstate 35.

At Ponca City, US 60 enters Osage County, leaving it at Bartlesville. From Vinita to Afton, the highway has a concurrency with Historic U.S. Highway 66 and U.S. Highway 69. The road meets Interstate 44 at Vinita and Afton. It passes through Twin Bridges State Park about 12 miles (19 km) west of the Missouri state line.

=== Missouri ===
US 60 crosses southern Missouri, south of Interstate 44. It crosses the Missouri-Oklahoma state line near the Missouri town Seneca. It is concurrent with U.S. Route 62 from Charleston and spans the Mississippi River to enter Illinois. Prior to the creation of the U.S. Highway system, U.S. Route 60 was Route 16.

Between the Missouri-Oklahoma state line and south of Seneca and Republic, US 60 is a two-lane highway, often splitting into alternating three-lane highways beginning at Monett. At Republic, the road becomes a four-lane divided highway, turning southeast onto the James River Freeway in the Springfield city limits.

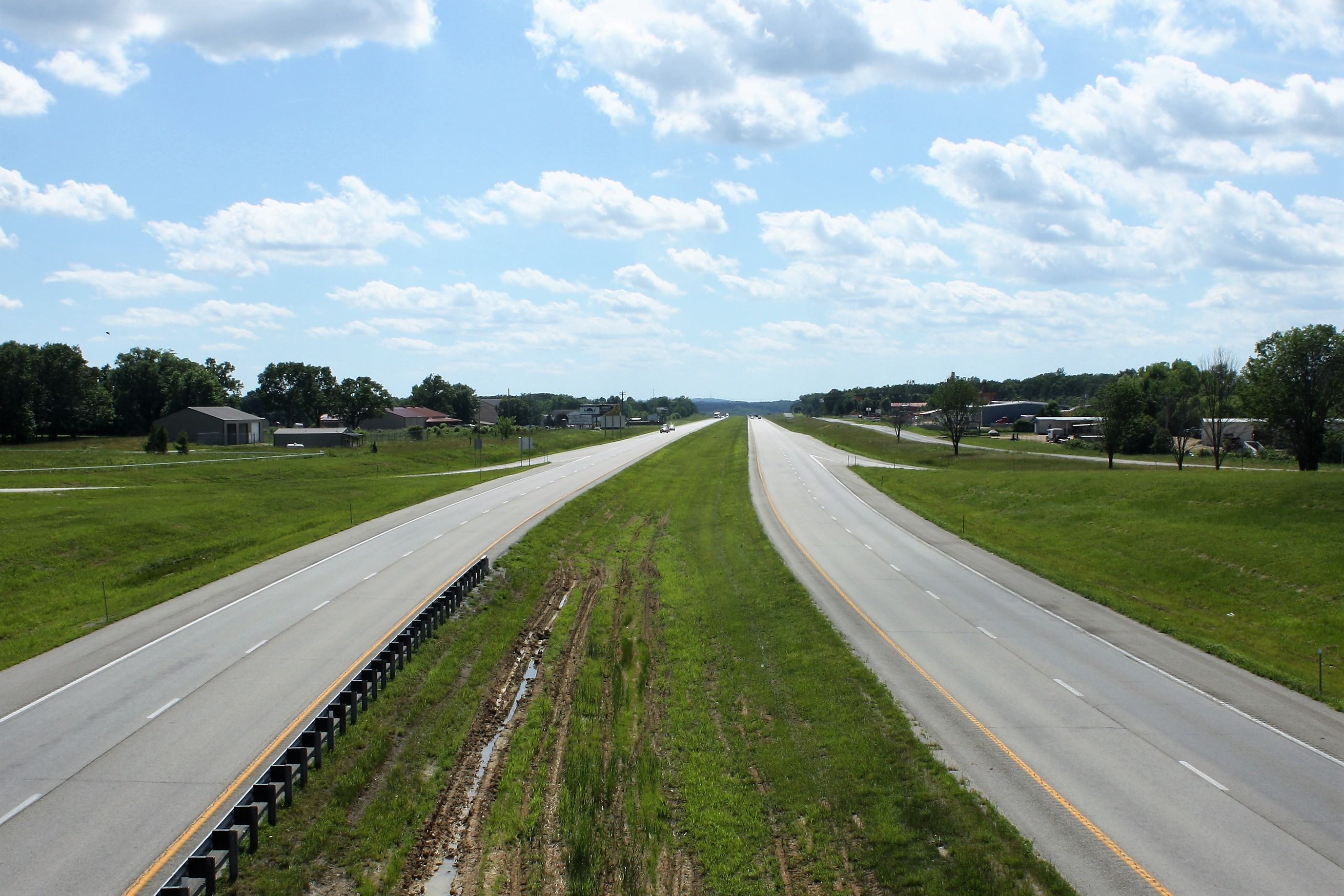
Freeway section of US 60 near Mountain Grove, Missouri

Most of the route east of Springfield is four-lane divided and several stretches are freeway-graded. On July 9, 2010, The Missouri Department of Transportation (MoDOT) finished the process of upgrading US 60 to four lanes along a 59-mile (95 km) segment between the towns of Willow Springs and Van Buren. This project's overall completion indicates that US 60 is now a four-lane facility from Springfield to Charleston, a distance of approximately 240 miles (390 km). A stretch of US 60 from east of US 65 in Springfield to Rogersville has been in long range plans on being upgraded to freeway status, therefore removing all at-grade crossings, installing overpasses and interchanges, and access roads.

At Mansfield, US 60 meets Missouri Route 5, which runs south towards Ava. U.S. 60 is briefly concurrent with Route 5 north of Mansfield, after which Route 5 continues north towards Hartville. On the southeast side of Cabool US 60 encounters US Route 63 and continues as a concurrency to Willow Springs, where the two routes separate with Route 60 continuing east to Mountain View and Route 63 continues south toward West Plains.

US 60 intersects Interstate 55 and Interstate 57 just southeast of Sikeston. It runs concurrently with I-57 from this junction to the east side of Charleston.

From Charleston to Bird's Point, where the route leaves Missouri on the Cairo Mississippi River Bridge, US 60 is now concurrent with U.S. Route 62 and - for a short distance - Route 77.

William Jefferson Blythe Jr., the biological father of former U.S. president Bill Clinton, died on Route 60 (now Route 114) outside of Sikeston, Missouri after being thrown from his car and drowning in a drainage ditch.

=== Illinois ===
U.S. 60 continues its concurrency with U.S. Highway 62 for its entire length, 0.92 miles (1.48 km), in Illinois. The routes enter Illinois at its very southern tip between the Mississippi and Ohio rivers.

The concurrent routes pass Fort Defiance, which lies at the lowest and southernmost point of Illinois, then intersect with U.S. 51 south of Cairo, turning eastward along with southbound U.S. 51 to cross the Ohio River into Kentucky.

=== Kentucky ===
US 60, along with US 51 and US 62, crosses into the Commonwealth of Kentucky from Cairo, Illinois. US 60 splits off from this concurrency at Wickliffe, and heads northeast towards Paducah. US 60 has an interchange with Interstate 24 and enters the city along with Business Loop 24. US 60 joins US 62 once again, and the routes head out of Paducah. US 60 splits off to the northeast and crosses the Tennessee River, while US 62 heads southeast and serves as the western terminus of US 68.

From there, US 60 roughly follows the Ohio River, traveling through the city of Smithland, and junctions US 641 at Marion. US 60 continues northeast to Morganfield, and then to Henderson, where it joins US 41-A on the west side of town. The two routes head to northeast Henderson, where they have an interchange with US 41. Kentucky's segment of Interstate 69 ends south of Henderson, but construction has begun to connect it with Indiana, where the interstate will be concurrent with US 41 and share the rebuilt interchange with US 60. From that interchange, US 60 heads east towards the city of Owensboro.

US 60 becomes the Wendell H. Ford Expressway, around the south side of the city of Owensboro. The route serves as the eastern terminus of the Audubon Parkway (future I-69 spur), as well as the northern terminus of US 431. US 231 joins US 60 and the routes serve as the northern terminus of I-165 (formerly the William H. Natcher Parkway). The routes travel north, leaving Owensboro, towards Maceo. At Maceo, US 60 splits from US 231 and heads east along the Ohio River traveling through the cities of Lewisport, Hawesville, and Cloverport. The route then goes southeast to Hardinsburg, and then traverses northeast to US 31W north of Fort Knox.

US 60 joins US 31W, and the routes travel north to the city of Louisville. US 60 branches off an alternate route, Alt. US 60, which traverses the south side of Louisville, while the main US 60 travels through the north side. The routes head north through the city, having an interchange with I-264 along the way. At Bernheim Lane, US 31W splits off US 60 and parallels on the west side, while US 60 continues north, traveling further into the city. US 60 joins US 150, and the routes travel east out of the downtown area. The routes junction US 31E, and US 60 goes north on US 31E, while US 150 goes south on US 31E. Then, US 60 turns off onto US 42, has an interchange with Interstate 64, and then splits off of US 42 and heads out of Louisville. Before leaving, Alternate US 60 joins back, and US 60 has an interchange with I-264 once more, and then with I-265.

US 60 parallels Interstate 64 as the route travels east through Shelbyville, and on into the capital city of Frankfort. Here, US 60 junctions US 127, and heads on east into the city. US 60 crosses the Kentucky River and continues east to US 421 and US 460. US 60 joins US 421, and the routes travel south for a bit, and then US 421 splits off of US 60 and heads east. US 60 heads southeast, crossing over to the south side of Interstate 64. US 60 joins US 62 once again in a strange concurrency (US 60 is heading east while US 62 is heading west, and vice versa). US 60 quickly splits off at Versailles, and then the route travels east towards Lexington.

US 60 enters Lexington after having an interchange with Kentucky Route 4 (KY 4). US 60 goes into the city, joining US 68 for a block, and then turns south onto US 25 and US 421. The three routes travel through downtown Lexington, and then US 60 splits off and heads east out of the city. On its way out, US 60 has an interchange with US 421 By-Pass and then with Interstate 75.

US 60 continues on east, paralleling Interstate 64. The route travels through Winchester, and then junctions US 460 in Mount Sterling. After leaving the city, US 60 crosses over to the north side of Insterstate 64, creating an interchange. From here, US 60 travels through the cities of Owingsville, Morehead, and Grayson, before turning northeast to head to the city of Ashland. In the city, US 60 joins US 23, and the two routes head south along the Ohio River. The routes continue to Catlettsburg, where US 60 leaves US 23 and heads east, crossing over the Big Sandy River on the Billy C. Clark Bridge into the state of West Virginia.

=== West Virginia ===
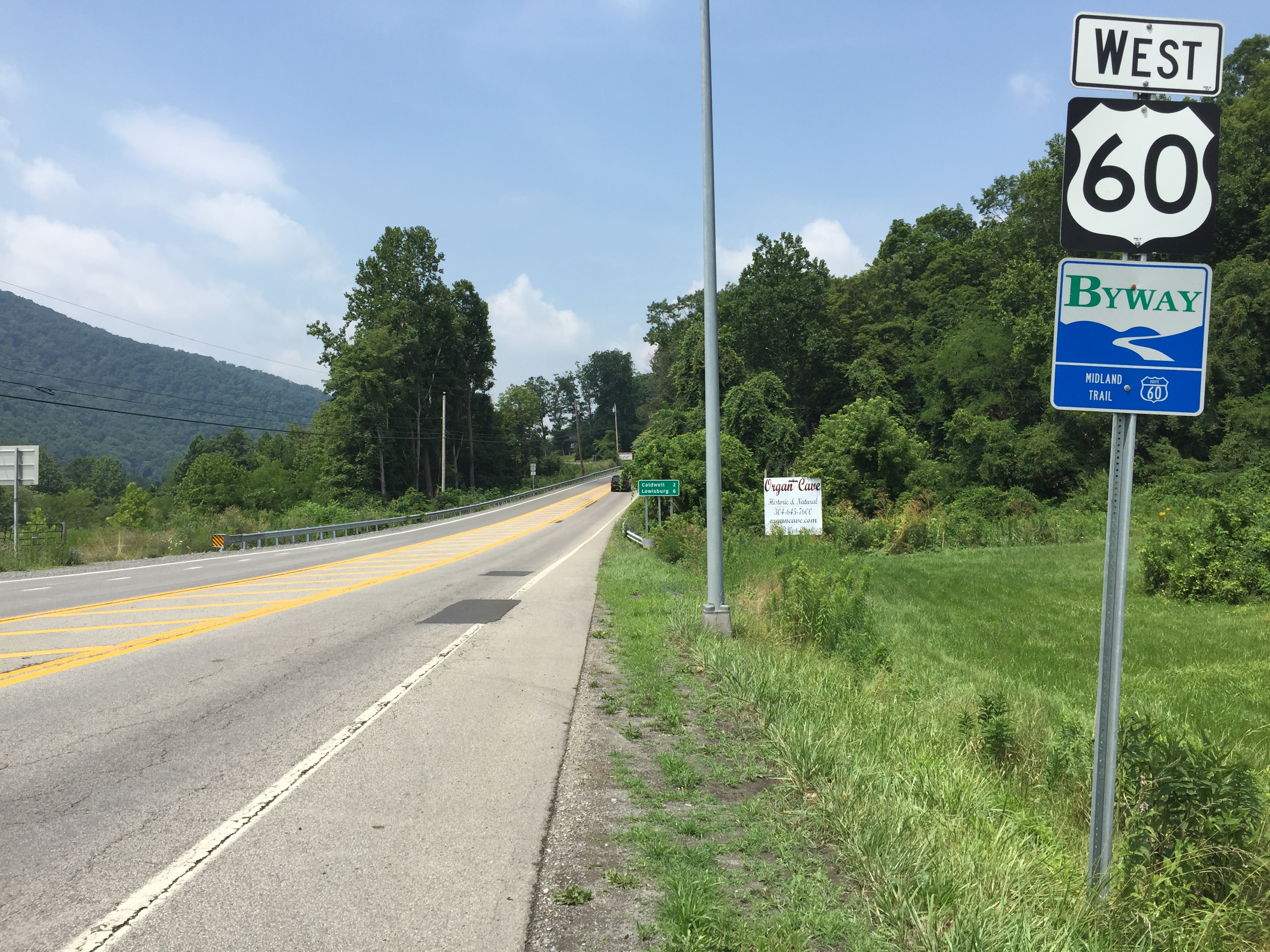
View west along US 60 at CR 60/14 departing White Sulphur Springs

In West Virginia, US 60 largely follows the path of the Midland Trail. It enters the state at Kenova by crossing over the Big Sandy River from the city of Catlettsburg, Kentucky. From there, it heads through Huntington east to Charleston.

From Charleston, US 60 heads southeast on its own course apart from Interstate 64, its replacement. The road first follows the Kanawha River to its source at Gauley Bridge, where US 60 then climbs out of the river valley and follows a twisting path through Rainelle and back to Interstate 64 at Sam Black Church. This stretch was the last section of US 60 to be bypassed by the Interstate system in West Virginia. I-64 between Beckley and Sam Black Church, West Virginia, was not completed and open to traffic until July 15, 1988. Due to its location, many miles away from I-64, US 60 still serves a large amount of traffic through the central part of the state, even though I-64 has replaced the highway for most through traffic. From the early 1970s, when I-64 was completed through Charleston to the West Virginia Turnpike until 1988, all east-west I-64 traffic was routed onto the mostly two lane U.S. 60 from Charleston to Sam Black Church where I-64 resumed. During this time U.S. 60 was signed by W.V.D.O.T. with a U.S. 60 shield and a "to I-64 (east or west)" sign in order to assure travelers they would eventually return to the interstate highway by following the federal designated route. This stretch of highway from Charleston to Sam Black Church is significant as it was the second to last segment of U.S. highway to be replaced by an interstate (of the original 1960s grid plan).

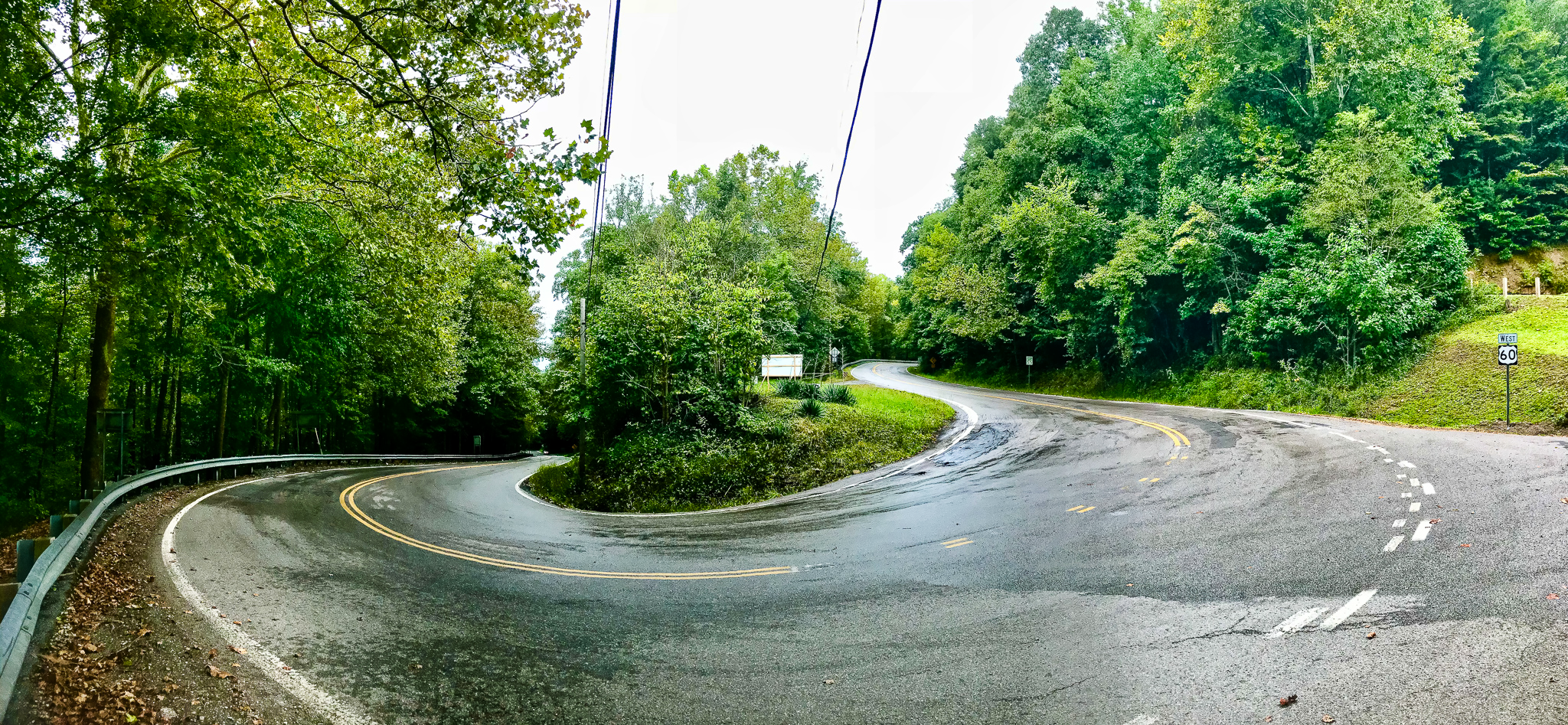
Switchback on U.S. Route 60 in Fayette County, West Virginia

From Sam Black Church east through Lewisburg to White Sulphur Springs, US 60 lives in the shadow of I-64 and carries a very small amount of traffic. Just east of White Sulphur Springs, US 60 joins I-64 for the last 2 miles (3.2 km) in the state before they enter Virginia at Allegheny Mountain.

=== Virginia ===
In Virginia, U.S. Route 60 runs 312 mi (502 km) west to east through the central part of the state, generally close to and paralleling the Interstate 64 corridor, except for the crossing of the Blue Ridge Mountains, and in the South Hampton Roads area.

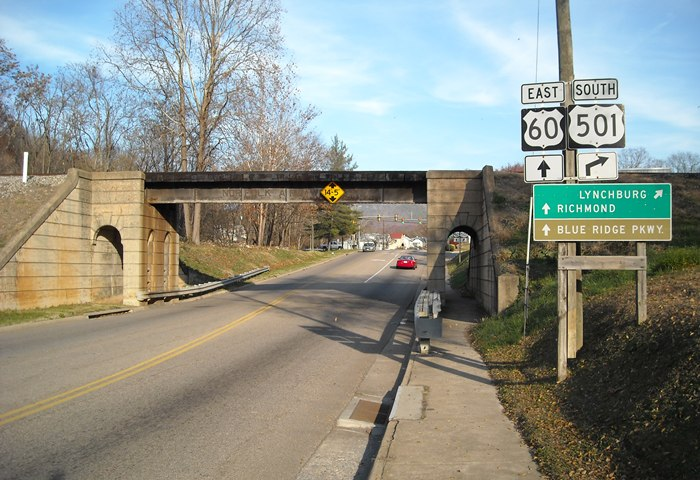
US 60 in Buena Vista, Virginia

Between Lexington in the Shenandoah Valley and Richmond, I-64 uses a lower elevation crossing of the Blue Ridge Mountains located about 30 miles (48 km) further north, where it runs parallel to U.S. Route 250 through Rockfish Gap. In contrast, through this section, the older US 60 is mostly a rural two-lane road. With the crossing of the Blue Ridge Mountains at a higher altitude in more rugged terrain, US 60 in this area offers much more challenging and weather-sensitive driving conditions, as well as a history of many crashes in the years before I-64 was completed.

East of north–south U.S. Route 29 (which runs parallel to the eastern slope of the Blue Ridge), the older US 60 and I-64 gradually converge as they pass through the rolling hills of the rocky Piedmont region in an easterly direction to reach the Fall Line at Richmond, where they again become very close.

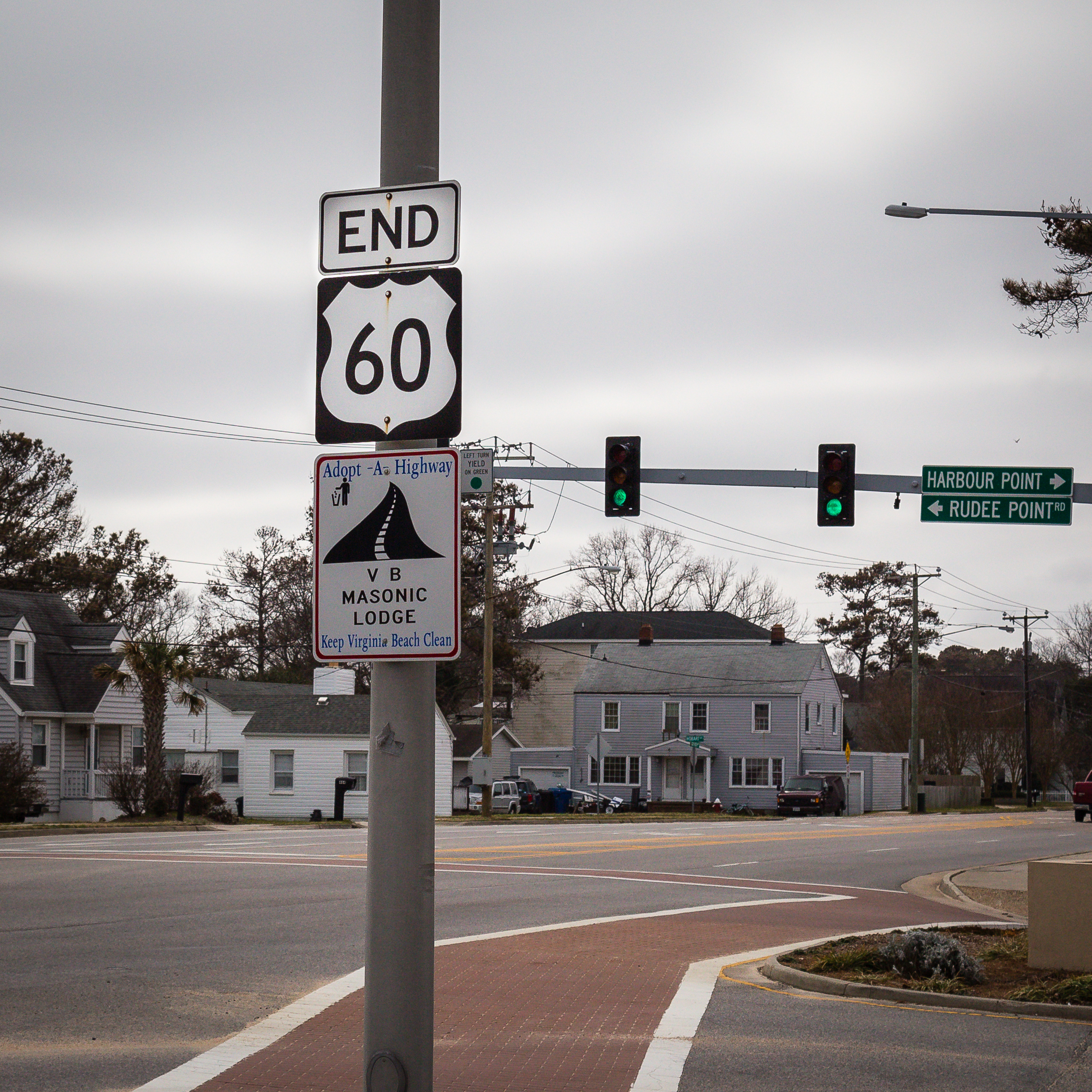
Posted eastern terminus in Virginia Beach

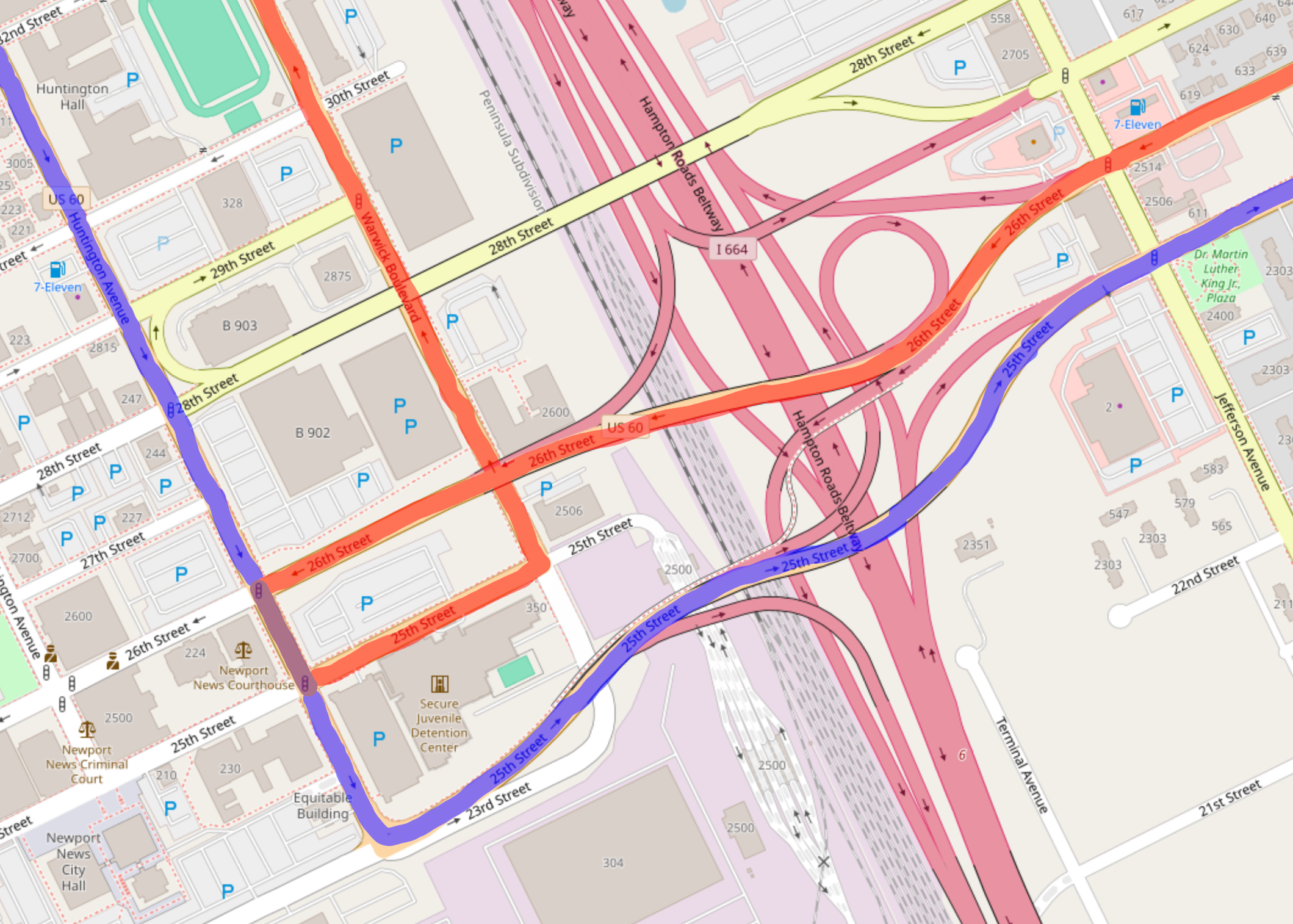
Alignment of US 60 in Newport News, demonstrating concurrency with itself Westbound lanes Eastbound lanes

From Richmond east to the harbor area near the mouth of Hampton Roads, US 60 again essentially parallels I-64 through Williamsburg and the Historic Triangle region, extending down the Virginia Peninsula east to the Hampton Roads Bridge-Tunnel which it shares with I-64. Along the way in Newport News, a notable section of Huntington Avenue (the one-way block between 25th and 26th streets) carries US 60 in both directions overlapping, a very rare configuration possibly only shared with US 19 Truck in Pittsburgh. A few miles south of the bridge-tunnel, in Norfolk, US 60 diverges to the east to follow the south shoreline of the Chesapeake Bay through Ocean View and past the south entrance to the Chesapeake Bay Bridge-Tunnel to reach Cape Henry. There it curves south to run along the Atlantic Ocean shoreline to end near the south end of the Virginia Beach resort strip.

== History ==
=== Historical California alignment ===
U.S. Route 60
- Location: Los Angeles–Ehrenberg, AZ
- Existed: 1926–1972

U.S. Route 60 has been fully decommissioned in California since 1972, when Interstate 10 was completed in California. It had a clear east-west orientation and was so signed.

Between downtown Los Angeles (its western terminus at its interchange with Interstates 5 and 10) it had an existence separate from U.S. Routes 70 and 99, lying to its south. US 60 passed through Pomona and Riverside, meeting US 70 and US 99 near Beaumont, east of which it coincided with US 70 and US 99 as far to the east as Indio. East of Indio, US 99 separated from US 60 and US 70, both continuing through the Colorado Desert to the Arizona state line at the Colorado River near Blythe almost entirely as a two-lane highway.

After the Great Renumbering of 1964, US 60 remained intact east of Beaumont, but for only eight years. Meanwhile, US 70 and US 99 had disappeared completely in Southern California. West of Beaumont, the route that had been US 60 was re-signed as State Route 60 (although often on a somewhat different alignment than the later California 60, as the new freeway had not yet been completed). East of Beaumont, US 60 remained in existence while Interstate 10 supplanted it, with the course of US 60 being moved to Interstate 10 and some sections of the old highway being demolished. In 1972, California decommissioned whatever remained of US 60 within the state as the last segments of Interstate 10 were opened. Parts of old US 60 (which in places coincided with US 70 and US 99) remain as business loops of Interstate 10 in Indio and Blythe.

US 60 had its beginnings in the Midland Trail, an auto trail organized in 1912 by residents of Grand Junction, Colorado. The next year, this route was considered but rejected for the Lincoln Highway, after which the Midland Trail Association laid out and marked its own transcontinental highway, eventually connecting Newport News, Virginia with Los Angeles, California. When the Joint Board on Interstate Highways published its preliminary plan for a system of interstate routes in 1925, the Midland Trail was split among many numbers, including 52, 62, 150, 50, and 40. East of Louisville, where it would become US 60, it was assigned parts of 52 and 62. Route 52 began at Newport News and followed the Midland Trail to Richmond, but took a more southerly route to Lexington, Virginia. The trail was used again through West Virginia to Huntington, where Route 52 split to the northwest. Route 62 began at Ashland, Kentucky (near Huntington) and followed the Midland Trail across northeastern Kentucky to Louisville, where the trail crossed the Ohio River and became Route 150. Route 62 continued southwest along the south bank of the Ohio River to Wickliffe in western Kentucky, and then crossed the Mississippi River at the Ohio's mouth. The final portion of Route 62 crossed southern Missouri to Springfield on an existing main highway that had been numbered 16 by the state.

Kentucky Governor William J. Fields objected to the Joint Board's plan, which took most major east–west routes (multiples of ten) to the East Coast, but sent Route 60 from Los Angeles northeast to end in Chicago, leaving none to cross Kentucky, the only Mississippi Valley state without such a route. Proposals were considered for splitting US 60 into 60N and 60E at Springfield (MO) or using 62 for the Chicago route; Missouri had already prepared maps that showed the original plans for 60 and 62. The final plan, agreed to by the affected states, assigned US 66 to the Los Angeles-Chicago highway and US 60 to the route from Springfield to Virginia Beach (extended from Newport News), absorbing all of 62 and part of 52 from the 1925 plan.

U.S. Highway 164
- Location: Amarillo, TX–Enid, OK
- Existed: 1928–1930

Although US 60 initially stretched less than halfway across the country, due to its late creation, it was soon extended west to Los Angeles. One auto trail — the Atlantic and Pacific Highway - and three other U.S. Highways played a part in this extension. The Atlantic and Pacific Highway had been organized in 1921, and connected New York City with Los Angeles. The original alignment of U.S. Route 70 entered Clovis, New Mexico from the east, as it does now, but continued west to Holbrook, Arizona. Crossing US 70 at Clovis was the El Paso-Amarillo U.S. Route 366. Finally, U.S. Route 164 was created by 1928, stretching northeast and east from Amarillo to U.S. Route 64 and U.S. Route 81 in Enid, Oklahoma. The American Association of State Highway Officials approved the first part of the extension in May 1930, following the rest of Missouri's Route 16 to the Oklahoma state line, and several state highways to Enid, before absorbing US 164 to a terminus at Amarillo. The remainder to Los Angeles was approved at AASHO's June 1931 meeting, and involved a number of other changes. US 60 replaced US 366 from Amarillo to Clovis, where it continued west along US 70 to Springerville, Arizona. The remainder of US 70 to Holbrook, Arizona became a new U.S. Route 260, while US 60 followed the Atlantic and Pacific Highway, which it had picked up at Vaughn, New Mexico, southwest and west through Phoenix to Los Angeles. US 70 was not truncated to Clovis, but was instead redirected southwest along US 366 to El Paso, and later reached Los Angeles itself, though most of the route west of Globe, Arizona overlapped US 60.

After the Interstate Highway System was signed into law in 1956, the Midland Trail portion of US 60, from Louisville east to the Hampton Roads area, was bypassed by Interstate 64. From Phoenix west to Los Angeles, Interstate 10 paralleled and, for the most part, replaced US 60. I-10 and I-64 were mostly completed by the late 1970s, though part of Interstate 64 in West Virginia, built on a new alignment east from Beckley, did not bypass the old winding US 60 until July 15, 1988. California decommissioned its portion of US 60 in 1972; most was replaced by I-10, while the independent piece in the Los Angeles area became State Route 60. In 1982, the portion overlapping I-10 in western Arizona was removed. US 60 between Phoenix and Louisville remains a major regional corridor in most places, and is not paralleled by an Interstate for any significant length.

== Major intersections ==
Arizona
I-10 southwest of Brenda
US 93 in Wickenburg
I-17 in Phoenix. The highways travel concurrently through the city.
I-10 in Phoenix. The highways travel concurrently to Tempe.
US 70 in Globe
US 180 / US 191 in Springerville. The highways travel concurrently through the town.
New Mexico
I-25 / US 85 in Socorro. The highways travel concurrently to south-southwest of Abeytas.
US 285 in Encino. The highways travel concurrently to southeast of Vaughn.
US 54 southwest of Vaughn. The highways travel concurrently to east-southeast of Vaughn.
US 84 in Fort Sumner. The highways travel concurrently to Texico.
US 70 in Clovis. The highways travel concurrently to Texico.
Texas
US 385 in Hereford
US 87 in Canyon. The highways travel concurrently to Amarillo.
I-27 north of Canyon. The highways travel concurrently to Amarillo.
I-27 / I-40 / US 287 in Amarillo. US 60/US 287 travels concurrently through the city.
US 83 south-southwest of Canadian. The highways travel concurrently to north-northeast of Canadian.
Oklahoma
US 283 west of Arnett. The highways travel concurrently to east of Arnett.
US 183 west-southwest of Seiling
US 270 / US 281 in Seiling. US 60/US 270 travels concurrently through the city. US 60/US 281 travels concurrently to Chester.
US 412 in Orienta. The highways travel concurrently to Enid.
US 81 in Enid. The highways travel concurrently to Pond Creek.
US 64 in Enid. The highways travel concurrently to west of Pond Creek.
I-35 in Tonkawa
US 77 in Tonkawa. The highways travel concurrently to Ponca City.
US 177 east of Tonkawa. The highways travel concurrently to Ponca City.
US 75 in Bartlesville. The highways travel concurrently through the city.
US 169 in Nowata
US 69 west-southwest of Vinita. The highways travel concurrently to northeast of Afton.
I-44 in Vinita
US 59 northeast of Afton. The highways travel concurrently for approximately 0.6 miles (0.97 km).
I-44 / US 59 / US 69 northeast of Afton
Missouri
I-49 / US 71 in Neosho
US 160 southwest of Springfield. The highways travel concurrently to Springfield.
US 65 in Springfield
US 63 southeast of Cabool. The highways travel concurrently to southeast of Willow Springs.
Future I-57 / US 67 south-southwest of Hendrickson. The highways travel concurrently to northwest of Poplar Bluff. I-57/US 60 will travel concurrently to Sikeston.
US 61 / US 62 in Sikeston.
I-55 / I-57 on the Sikeston–Miner city line. I-57/US 60 travels concurrently to Charleston.
I-57 / US 62 in Charleston. US 60/US 62 travels concurrently to Wickliffe, Kentucky, with a short Illinois segment in-between.
Illinois
US 51 in Cairo. The highways travel concurrently to Wickliffe, Kentucky.
Kentucky
I-24 in Paducah
US 45 in Paducah. The highways travel concurrently through the city.
US 45 / US 62 in Paducah. US 60/US 62 travel concurrently to Riverview.
US 641 in Marion
Future I-69 / US 41 in Henderson
US 431 in Owensboro
US 231 in Owensboro. The highways travel concurrently to Maceo.
I-165 in Owensboro
US 31W in Fort Knox. The highways travel concurrently to Louisville.
Future I-265 in Louisville
I-264 in Shively
US 31W / US 150 in Louisville. The highways travel concurrently through the city.
US 31W in Louisville. The highways travel concurrently for one block.
US 31 / US 31E in Louisville. US 31E/US 60 travel concurrently through the city.
I-64 in Louisville
US 42 in Louisville
I-264 on the St. Matthews–Louisville city line
I-265 in Middletown
US 127 in Frankfort
US 421 / US 460 in Frankfort. US 60/US 421 travels concurrently through the city.
I-64 in Jett
US 62 in Versailles. The highways travel concurrently through the city.
US 27 / US 68 in Lexington. The highways travel concurrently through the city.
US 25 / US 27 / US 68 / US 421 in Lexington. US 25/US 60/US 421 travels concurrently through the city.
I-75 in Lexington
I-64 northeast of Winchester
US 460 in Mt. Sterling. The highways travel concurrently through the city.
I-64 northeast of Mt. Sterling
I-64 east-southeast of Owingsville
I-64 northeast of Olive Hill
I-64 in Coalton
US 23 in Ashland. The highways travel concurrently to Catlettsburg.
West Virginia
US 52 in Huntington
I-64 in Barboursville
I-64 in South Charleston
US 119 in Charleston
I-64 in Charleston
I-64 / I-77 in Charleston. The highways travel concurrently to southeast of Snow Hill.
I-64 in Chelyan
US 19 in Hico
I-64 south-southeast of Crawley
US 219 in Lewisburg
I-64 east of White Sulphur Springs
I-64 east-southeast of White Sulphur Springs. The highways travel concurrently to Callaghan, Virginia.
Virginia
US 220 in Covington. The highways travel concurrently to east-northeast of Clifton Forge.
I-64 in Mallow. The highways travel concurrently to north-northwest of Lexington.
US 11 southeast of Lexington
I-81 southeast of Lexington
US 501 in Buena Vista
US 29 in Amherst
US 15 in Sprouses Corner
US 522 northwest of Powhatan
US 1 / US 301 in Richmond
US 360 in Richmond. The highways travel concurrently through the city.
I-295 east-southeast of Sandston
US 17 / US 258 in Newport News
I-664 in Newport News
I-664 in Newport News
I-64 in Hampton. The highways travel concurrently to Norfolk.
US 460 in Norfolk
US 13 in Virginia Beach
US 58 in Virginia Beach
5th Street/General Booth Boulevard in Virginia Beach

== See also ==
- U.S. Route 160
- U.S. Route 260
- U.S. Route 360
- U.S. Route 460
- Special routes of U.S. Route 60

Browse numbered routes
← SR 51	AZ	→ SR 61
← SH 59	TX	→ SH 60
← SH-59	OK	→ US 62
← Route 59	MO	→ US 61
← IL 59	IL	→ IL 60
← KY 59	list	→ KY 61
← WV 59	list	→ WV 61
