= U.S. Route 60 in New Mexico =

Segment of American highway

U.S. Highway 60
- US 60 highlighted in red

Route information
- Maintained by NMDOT
- Length: 366.982 mi (590.600 km)
- Existed: June 8, 1931–present
- History: Original route of US 70

Major junctions
- West end: US 60 at the Arizona state line near Springerville, AZ
- I-25 / US 85 in Socorro; NM 47; US 285 in Encino; NM 3 in Encino; US 54 in Vaughn; US 84 in Fort Sumner; US 70 in Clovis
- East end: US 60 at the Texas state line in Texico

Location
- Country: United States
- State: New Mexico
- Counties: Catron, Socorro, Torrance, Guadalupe, De Baca, Roosevelt, Curry

Highway system
- United States Numbered Highway System; List; Special; Divided; New Mexico State Highway System; Interstate; US; State; Scenic
← NM 59	→ NM 61

U.S. Route 60 (US 60) is an east–west United States Highway within New Mexico. It begins at the Arizona state line and continues east to the Texas state line.

== Route description ==
US 60 enters New Mexico in Catron County east of Springerville, Arizona. The road makes an arc through Catron County, with the apex at Quemado, avoiding Apache-Sitgreaves National Forest and Escondido Mountain. East of Pie Town, the road crosses the Continental Divide at an elevation of 7,796 feet (2,376 m).

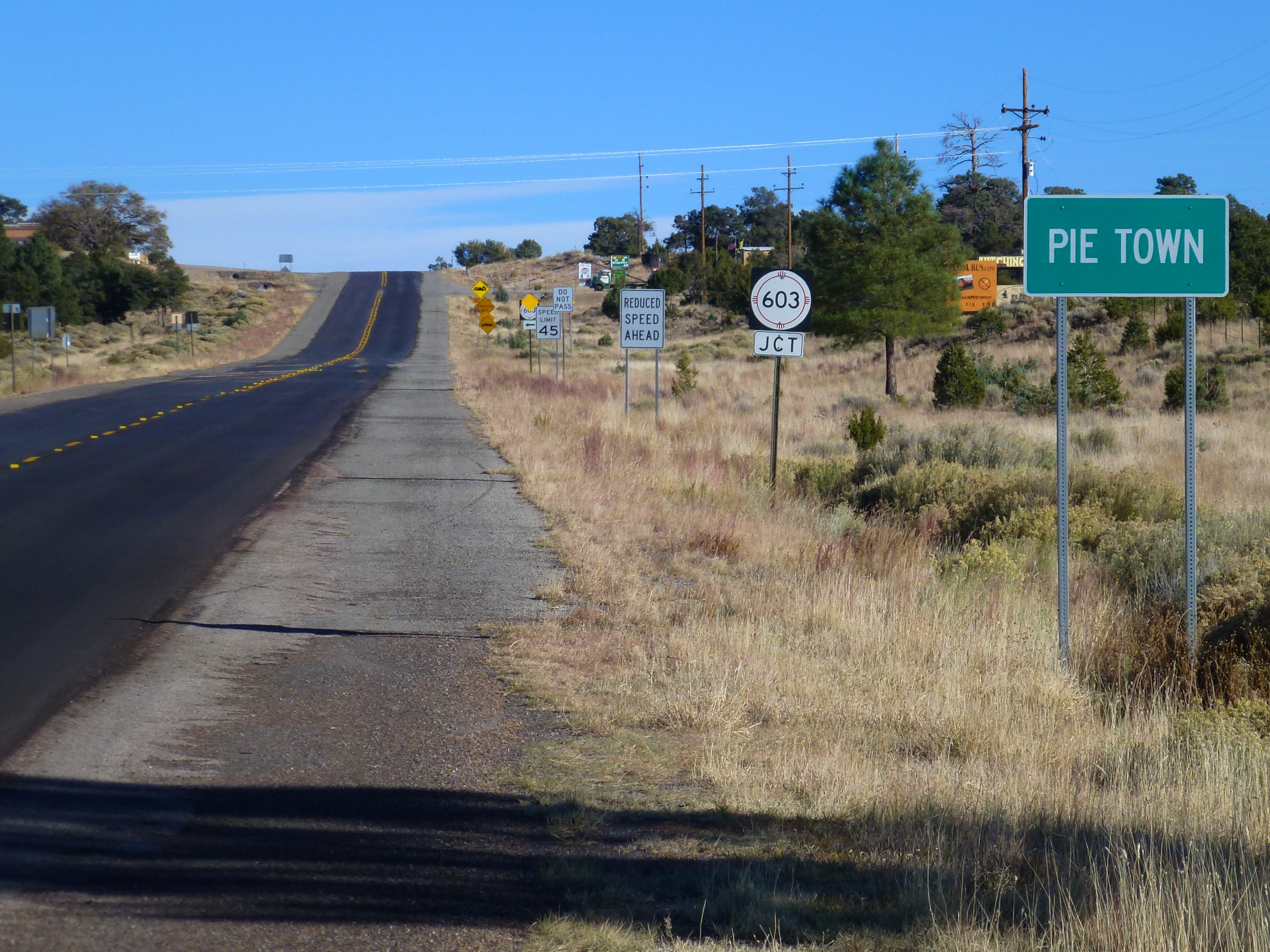
US 60 eastbound at the junction with NM 603 in Pie Town

Between the divide and Datil, US 60 cuts through Cibola National Forest and the Datil Mountains. In Datil, US 60 serves as the eastern terminus of New Mexico State Road 12 (NM 12).

East of Datil, US 60 traverses the northern end of the Plains of San Augustin, then crosses the county line into Socorro County. The road bisects the Very Large Array complex and a track used in rearranging the antennas that make up the Array crosses the highway. Some 36 miles (58 km) into the county, the highway passes through Magdalena.

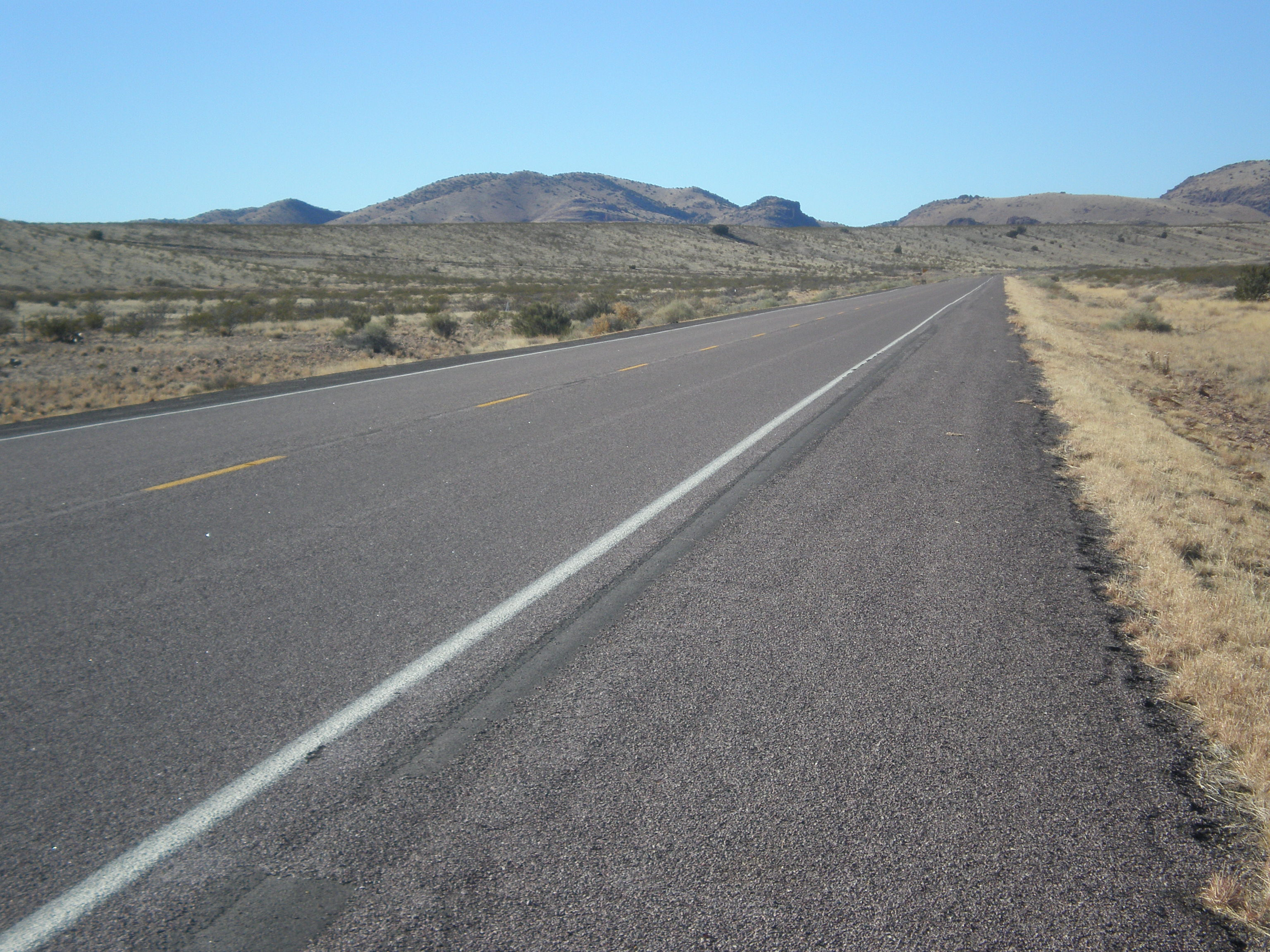
US 60 looking west, west of Socorro

It then enters the county seat of Socorro, where it meets Interstate 25 (I-25). US 60 heads north, running concurrently with the Interstate.

US 60 splits from I-25 near Bernardo, about 25 miles (40 km) north of Socorro. Most of the route of US 60 from Abo Canyon to the Texas line parallels the Southern Transcon of the Atchison, Topeka and Santa Fe Railway. It turns back eastward, rising through Abo Pass at the southern end of the Manzano Mountains before crossing into Torrance County and passing through Mountainair, where it intersects NM 55. After passing through Willard, it sets out across the Pedernal Hills. In Encino, it begins a concurrency with US 285. Just after crossing into Guadalupe County, US 54 joins the concurrency. The three highways pass through Vaughn and then go their separate ways; US 285 heads southeast towards the direction of Roswell, US 54 heads northeast towards both Santa Rosa and I-40, and US 60 heads east towards Clovis.

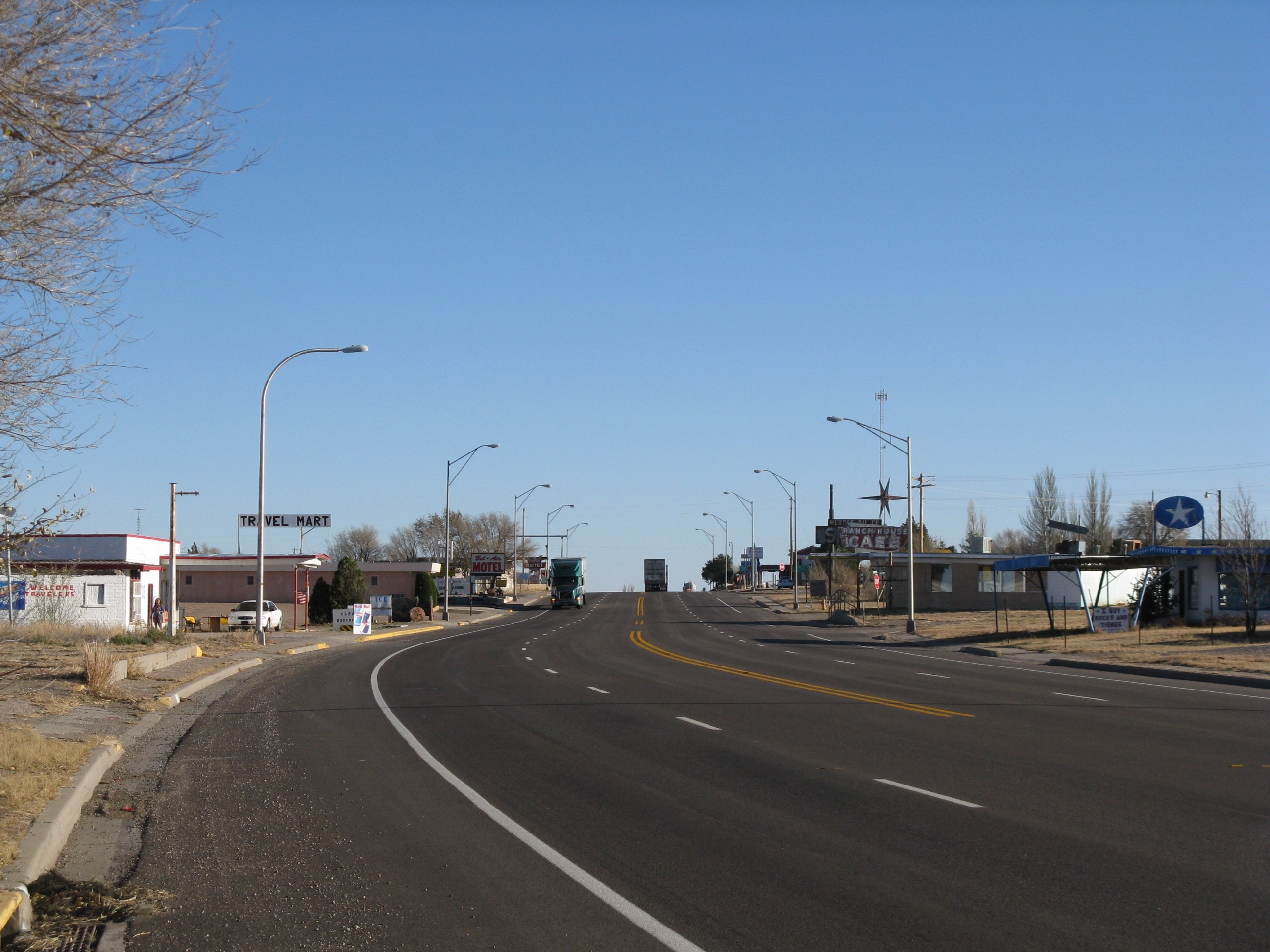
US 54, US 60 and US 285 in Vaughn.

US 60 angles southeast toward Yeso, entering De Baca County en route. Curving back towards the east, the road enters Fort Sumner, the county seat, 21 miles (34 km) later. Just west of town, it serves as the northern terminus of NM 20, and in Fort Sumner proper, it overlaps US 84, which will persist until just before the Texas border. East of town the two highways encounter NM 212, a spur to Fort Sumner State Monument, and NM 252 in Taiban.

US 60/US 84 passes through Tolar near the De Baca–Roosevelt county line. The two routes do not stay in Roosevelt County for long, however, proceeding into Curry County west of Melrose. The highways pass through Melrose, St. Vrain, and Grier before widening out to a four-lane highway as they approach Clovis, the Curry County seat. In Clovis, the home of Cannon Air Force Base, the highways meet up with US 70, which joins the concurrency. The three highways proceed through Texico, and just before the Texas state line, US 60 leaves the concurrency and heads northeast while US 70/US 84 continues eastward.

For the distance of more than 300 miles (480 km) between Abo Pass and Amarillo, the highway parallels the Southern Transcon, one of the busiest transcontinental railroads in the west.

== Major intersections ==
County	Location	mi	km	Exit	Destinations	Notes
Catron		0.000	0.000		US 60 west – Springerville	Continuation in Arizona
Catron					NM 601	
Catron	Quemado				NM 32	
Catron	Quemado	34.5	55.5		NM 36	
Catron	Pie Town	55.5	89.3		NM 603	
Catron	Datil	77.0	123.9		NM 12	
Socorro		92.4	148.7		NM 52	
Socorro	Magdalena				NM 169	
Socorro	Magdalena				NM 107	
Socorro	Socorro	138.7	223.2		California Street south (I-25 BL) to I-25 south	Western end of I-25 BL concurrency
Socorro	Socorro				I-25 BL ends I-25 south (US 85 south) – Las Cruces	Northern terminus of I-25 BL; eastern end of I-25 BL concurrency; western end of I-25/US 85 concurrency; I-25 exit 150
Socorro	Escondida			152	Escondida	Exit numbers follow I-25
Socorro	Lemitar			156	Lemitar	Exit numbers follow I-25
Socorro				163	San Acacia	Exit numbers follow I-25
Socorro				169	Sevilleta National Wildlife Refuge	Exit numbers follow I-25
Socorro	Bernardo	165.1	265.7		I-25 north (US 85 north) – Albuquerque	Eastern end of I-25/US 85 concurrency; I-25 exit 175
Socorro	Bernardo				NM 116 north	Former US 85
Socorro					NM 304	
Socorro		182.5	293.7		NM 47	
Torrance		194.4	312.9		NM 513	
Torrance	Mountainair	204.2	328.6		NM 55	
Torrance					NM 41	
Torrance	Willard	218.0	350.8		NM 42	
Torrance	Encino				US 285 north	Western end of US 285 concurrency
Torrance	Encino	253.1	407.3		NM 3	
Guadalupe	Vaughn				US 54 west	Western end of US 54 concurrency
Guadalupe	Vaughn				US 285 south	Eastern end of US 285 concurrency
Guadalupe	Vaughn				US 54 east	Eastern end of US 54 concurrency
De Baca	Fort Sumner				NM 20	
De Baca	Fort Sumner	327.0	526.3		US 84 north – Santa Rosa	Western end of US 84 concurrency
De Baca	Fort Sumner				NM 272	
De Baca					NM 212	
De Baca	Taiban	340.7	548.3		NM 294	
De Baca	Taiban	341.5	549.6		NM 252	
Roosevelt	No major junctions					
Curry	Melrose	362.9	584.0		NM 268	
Curry	Melrose	363.9	585.6		NM 267	
Curry		367.9	592.1		NM 224	
Curry	Clovis	380.8	612.8		NM 311	
Curry	Clovis	383.9	617.8		NM 467	
Curry	Clovis	388.0	624.4		US 70 west (Prince Street south) / NM 209 north (Prince Street north)	Western end of US 70 concurrency; southern terminus of NM 209
Curry	Texico	396.3	637.8		NM 108 north	
Curry	Texico	396.6	638.3		NM 348	
Curry	Texico	396.7	638.4		US 70 / US 84 east	Eastern end of US 70/US 84 concurrency
Curry	Texico	396.8	638.6		US 60 east – Amarillo	Continuation into Texas
1.000 mi = 1.609 km; 1.000 km = 0.621 mi: Concurrency terminus

U.S. Route 60
Previous state: Arizona	New Mexico	Next state: Texas
