= Yeso =

Yeso may refer to:

- Yeso, New Mexico, an unincorporated community
- Yeso Creek, a stream in New Mexico
- Yeso Formation, a geological formation in New Mexico
- Yeso River, a river in Chile
- Ezo, a region of Japan (as variant spelling)

== See also ==
- Ezo (disambiguation)
