= Tolar (disambiguation) =

Tolar may refer to:

== Coins and currencies ==
- Tolar
- Slovenian tolar

== Place ==
- Tolar Grande
- Tolar, New Mexico, USA ghost town
- Tolar, Texas

== People ==
- Charlie Tolar
- Daniel Tolar

=== Fictional people ===
- Avery Tolar
- Grathon Tolar

== See also ==
- Tola (disambiguation)
