= New Mexico State Road 294 =

State highway in New Mexico, United States

State Road 294
- NM 294 highlighted in red

Route information
- Maintained by NMDOT
- Length: 15.737 mi (25.326 km)

Major junctions
- Southern end: End of state maintenance
- Northern end: US 60 / US 85 in Taiban

Location
- Country: United States
- State: New Mexico
- Counties: De Baca

Highway system
- New Mexico State Highway System; Interstate; US; State; Scenic
← NM 293	→ NM 296

State Road 294 (NM 294) is a 15.737-mile-long (25.326 km) state highway in the US state of New Mexico. NM 294's southern terminus is at the end of state maintenance, and the northern terminus is at U.S. Route 60 (US 60) and US 85 in Taiban.

== Major intersections ==
The entire route is in De Baca County.

Location	mi	km	Destinations	Notes
Taiban	0.000	0.000	US 60 / US 85	Northern terminus
	15.737	25.326	End of state maintenance	Southern terminus
1.000 mi = 1.609 km; 1.000 km = 0.621 mi
