= Tolar, New Mexico =

- Ghost Town
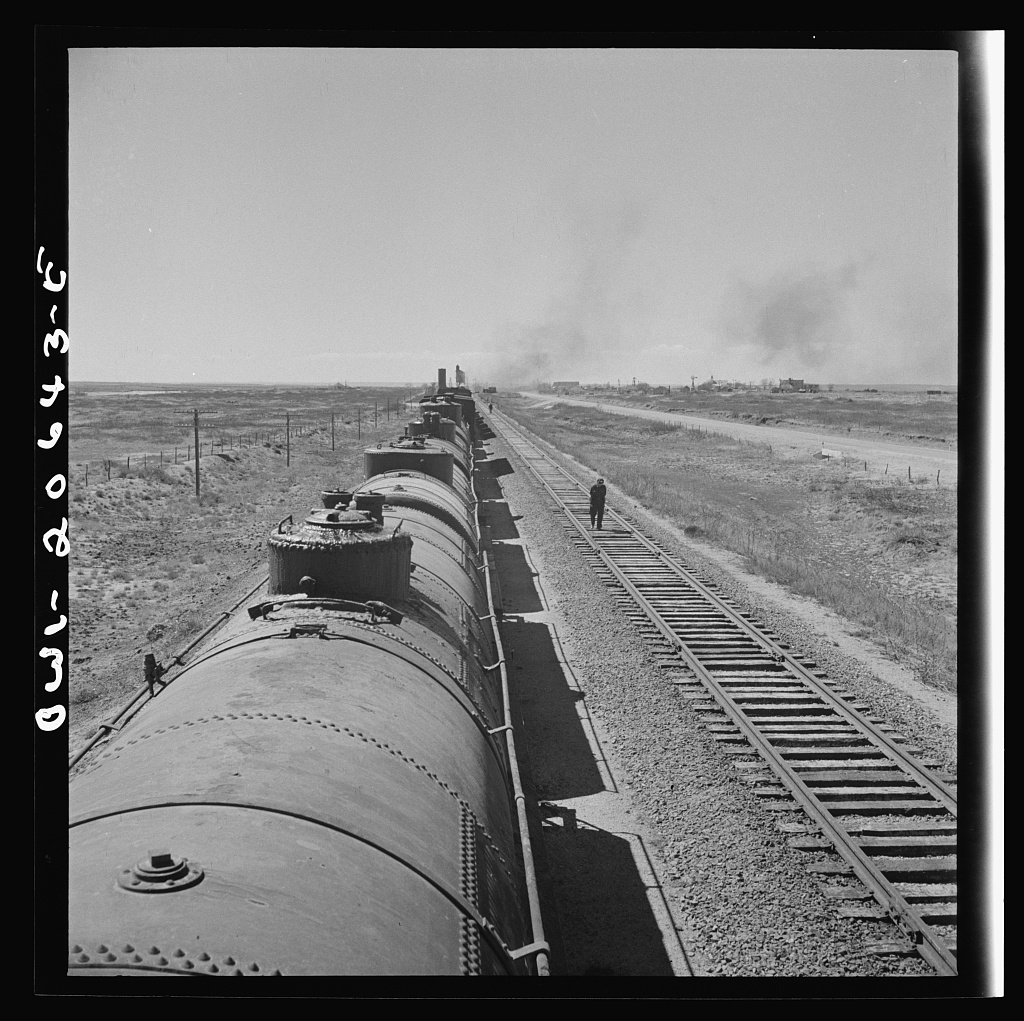
- Santa Fe train stopping for water at Tolar, March 1943

- Location of Roosevelt County, New Mexico
- Country: United States
- State: New Mexico
- County: Roosevelt
- Elevation: 4,222 ft (1,287 m)

Population
  - Total: 0
- Time zone: UTC-7 (Mountain (MST))
  - Summer (DST): UTC-6 (MDT)
- ZIP Code: 88134
- Area code: 575
- GNIS feature ID: 899957

Tolar, New Mexico (pronounced TOL-er) is a ghost town in the panhandle of northern Roosevelt County that existed in the 20th century. The site is at the intersection of New Mexico State Road 86 and U.S. Routes 60 and 84 between Fort Sumner in De Baca County and Melrose in Curry County. Tolar was established as a stop on the Belen Cutoff of the Santa Fe Railway in 1907. A train carrying munitions exploded there in 1944, causing the largest accidental explosion in New Mexico history.

== Origin ==
In August 1872, a United States Army unit commanded by Ranald S. Mackenzie following an Indian trail across the Llano Estacado camped near the future site of Tolar. The first settler in the vicinity of Tolar was Alvin Ellender Jeter, who applied for a patent on 160 acres of land under the Homestead Act in 1901. Jeter found abundant groundwater there and built a half-dugout house. His daughter Marvie Ellen Jeter, born July 9, 1903, was the first child born at Tolar. The Jeter family moved to Haskell, Texas in 1917.

To bypass the steep grades on its line through the Raton and Glorieta Passes, the Eastern Railway of New Mexico, a subsidiary of the Atchison, Topeka, and Santa Fe Railway, in 1903 began work on the Belen Cutoff across east central New Mexico, building a new line eastward from Belen through the Abo Pass to Texico on the state line with Texas. Much sand and gravel for construction of the railroad came from the vicinity of Tolar. Tolar was at the western end of the Muleshoe Dunes, a one-hundred mile long aeolian landform that stretches to Muleshoe, Texas. A race riot broke out in 1905 amongst the construction workers and railroad men that led to eight deaths; supposedly, the bodies were buried in fill at Tolar. The cutoff was finished in December 1907.

While still a tent city, the United States Post Office Department opened a post office at Tolar on August 18, 1905. J.W. Coleman, the first postmaster, named the town for Tolar, Texas, where his daughter lived. In 1908, the town was platted. A weekly newspaper, the Tribune, was founded in March 1908. By 1911, 600 people lived there. C.H. Scruggs, a Tolar resident, was elected a Roosevelt County commissioner in 1920. A 1921 business directory stated the population was 56 and listed an attorney, a justice of the peace, a garage, a general store, a carpenter, a poultryman, and a dealer in hardware and drugs; the postmaster was C.C. Yarborough. Tolar had a school until 1926, when it was consolidated with one in Taiban. The railroad station closed in March 1933. Sand and gravel were still being mined at Tolar in 1937.

== 1944 explosion ==
Midday on November 30, 1944, an eighty-one-car west-bound mixed freight train derailed after a hot box on the seventh car of the train led to its axle breaking. The train was pulled by ATSF 5002, a 2-10-4 steam engine. The crew was B.L. Clark (engineer), J. Worley (fireman), Jack Miller (brakeman), Darry Winn (conductor), and J.J. Johnson (brakeman). The train carried airplane engines, canned corned beef, mattresses, fuel oil, and 165 five-hundred-pound bombs bound for the Pacific Theatre. Thirty-six cars derailed. The oil car caught fire. The train's conductor phoned to Clovis for a locomotive to pull the munitions away from the fire, but it did not arrive in time to prevent the explosion.

After burning for twenty to thirty minutes, the munitions exploded. The explosion dug a crater 75 feet wide and 10 feet deep. Five-hundred feet of track was wrecked. Most of the buildings in Tolar were destroyed, including the post office, the railroad station, and the grocery. About 30 people lived at Tolar at the time. The blast was felt 120 miles away in Hereford, Texas. Thirty miles to the southeast in Elida, dishes fell from their shelves and windows broke in Melrose, twelve miles to the east. Both Clovis Army Air Field and Fort Sumner Army Air Field sent firefighters to the scene.

One person was killed, Tolar resident Jess Brown, who was struck in the head by a piece of metal and died while being transported to the hospital in Melrose. His widow, Pauline Brown, received a $17,500 settlement from the railroad for his death.

Because of the war, the Federal Bureau of Investigation sent Special Agent R.J. Untreiner to investigate.The Bureau found no signs of sabotage and that it was an accident.

While The New York Times reported only a single paragraph about the accident, it was front-page news in New Mexico newspapers. Because of that news coverage, officials of the Manhattan Project issued a cover story of an ammunition explosion on the Alamogordo Air Force Base on July 16, 1945, after the test of the first atomic bomb.

== Tolar today ==
While the town had been declining for years, the explosion hastened its demise. The post office was closed April 5, 1946, mail being redirected to the Taiban post office. Today, there is nothing left of the community as Tolar “is only a wide spot” on the highway.

Two locomotives and five freight cars of a BNSF Railroad freight train derailed at Tolar on September 21, 1997.

On November 21, 2014, ahead of the seventieth anniversary of the explosion, the New Mexico Department of Transportation dedicated a historical marker to commemorate the event. The marker was requested by historian Randy Dunson. The marker is located near mile marker 344 on U.S. Highway 60 and 84, two miles west of the site of Tolar.

The site of Tolar is in the Portales Micropolitan Statistical Area, which is part of the larger Clovis-Portales Combined Statistical Area.
