= New Mexico State Road 20 =

State Road 20

Route information
- Maintained by NMDOT
- Length: 45.906 mi (73.879 km)

Major junctions
- South end: US 285 by Roswell
- North end: US 60 by Fort Sumner

Location
- Country: United States
- State: New Mexico
- Counties: Chaves, De Baca

Highway system
- New Mexico State Highway System; Interstate; US; State; Scenic
← NM 19	→ NM 21

State Road 20 (NM 20) is a state highway in the US state of New Mexico. Its total length is approximately 45.9 miles (73.9 km). NM 20's southern terminus is at US 285 by Roswell, and the northern terminus is by Fort Sumner, at US 60.

== Major intersections ==
County	Location	mi	km	Destinations	Notes
Chaves	Roswell	0.000	0.000	US 285	Southern terminus
De Baca	Fort Sumner	45.906	73.879	US 60	Northern terminus
1.000 mi = 1.609 km; 1.000 km = 0.621 mi
