= Fern Sawyer =

American cowgirl (1917-1993)

Fern Sawyer

Fern Sawyer (1917 – October 16, 1993, also known as Fern Eidson) was an American cowgirl, rodeo champion, politician and inductee into the National Cowgirl Museum and Hall of Fame and the Rodeo Hall of Fame of the National Cowboy and Western Heritage Museum. She was the first woman to win the cutting horse competition at the 1945 Fort Worth Fat Stock Show and Rodeo. Sawyer was also the first woman appointed to the New Mexico State Fair Board. She was well known for her "flashy attire," according to the Santa Fe New Mexican. She lived in Crossroads, Lovington, and Nogal, New Mexico. She was also a charter member of the National Cutting Horse Association and the first director of the Girls Rodeo Association.

== Early life ==
Sawyer was born near Yeso, New Mexico. Sawyer grew up on a ranch where her father insisted she "perform as well as the men if she was to help with the ranch work," according to the National Cowgirl Museum and Hall of Fame. Sawyer began to enter rodeo competitions while she was in high school. She attended Texas Tech for about 3 years, studying home economics. At Texas Tech, she was going to be kicked out for attending a rodeo.

== Career ==
She was sponsored by Madison Square Garden in a rodeo event in 1939. In 1943, she defeated twenty men in the Pecos rodeo. Sawyer was also the first woman to win 1st place in the cutting horse competition at the 1945 Fort Worth Fat Stock Show and Rodeo. In the 1945 show, she was the only woman competing. In 1946, she came in second in cutting at the Fort Worth Stock Show. In 1947, she earned the title of All-Around world Champion Cowgirl. Sawyer stopped competing in rodeo in 1949. She worked as a judge for rodeo and other equestrian contests afterwards.

In 1963, she was appointed by Governor Jack Campbell to become the first woman to serve on the New Mexico State Fair Board. In 1969, she was elected the Lincoln County Democratic Party chairperson. She was not re-appointed to the state fair board in 1974 after she backed the opponent of Jerry Apodaca for New Mexico governor.

== Death and honors ==
In 1976, she was inducted into the Cowgirl Hall of Fame. In 1991, she was inducted into the National Rodeo Hall of Fame at the National Cowboy Hall of Fame. In 1985, she was inducted into the NCHA Members Hall of Fame for her extraordinary contributions to the sport of cutting. An award is given by the National Cowgirl Museum and Hall of Fame in Sawyer's name to recognize cowgirls and ranch women who excel in their field, and who help advance the mission and recognition of the museum and hall of fame. The Fern Sawyer Award from the National Cowgirl Museum and Hall of Fame was named after her. The inaugural presentation of the award was in 1994 to Anne W. Marion. In 1995, she was inducted into the Western Heritage Museum & Lea County Cowboy Hall of Fame. Sawyer died in 1993 of a heart attack while riding a horse.

== Personal ==
Sawyer married Scharbauer Eidson of New Mexico in December 1948. They lived in Crossroads, New Mexico, at the time. Their ranch, the Sawyer Ranch, is located in the middle of a big oil field which has paid off. Later, the Eidsons lived on the Shoe Bar Ranch in Lovington, New Mexico. In her latter days, Sawyer took on gentler pursuits such as judging and horse cutting.
