= Ezo (disambiguation) =

Ezo (蝦夷) is a Japanese name which historically referred to the lands to the north of the Japanese island of Honshu.

Ezo or EZO may also refer to:

== Places and peoples ==
- Hokkaido, formerly known as Ezo, the second largest island of Japan
- Republic of Ezo, a short-lived state in 1869 on Hokkaido
- Ainu people, in the historical Japanese texts Ezo, an indigenous people of Japan
- Ezo, South Sudan

== Species ==
- Ezo (alga), a genus of red algae in the subfamily Lithophylloideae
- Ezo red fox, Vulpes vulpes schrencki, a subspecies of red fox
- Hokkaido wolf, Canis lupus hattai, also known as the Ezo wolf
- Patinopecten yessoensis, the Yesso scallop or Ezo giant scallop, a species of scallop
- Ezo salamander, Hynobius retardatus, a species of salamander
- Ezo flying squirrel

== Other uses ==
- Ezo (band), a Japanese heavy metal band 1982–1990
  - EZO (album)

== See also ==
- Yeso (disambiguation)
