= New Mexico State Road 213 =

State highway in New Mexico, United States

State Road 213
- NM 213 highlighted in red

Route information
- Maintained by NMDOT
- Length: 6.085 mi (9.793 km)

Major junctions
- South end: FM 3255 at the Texas state line in Chaparral
- North end: End of state maintenance by White Sands Missile Range

Location
- Country: United States
- State: New Mexico
- Counties: Doña Ana

Highway system
- New Mexico State Highway System; Interstate; US; State; Scenic
← NM 212	→ NM 214

State Road 213 (NM 213) is a 6.085-mile-long (9.793 km) state highway in the US state of New Mexico. NM 213's southern terminus is a continuation as Farm to Market Road 3255 (FM 3255) at the Texas state line, and the northern terminus is at the end of state maintenance by White Sands Missile Range.

== Major intersections ==
The entire route is in Doña Ana County.

Location	mi	km	Destinations	Notes
Chaparral	0.000	0.000	FM 3255	Southern terminus
Chaparral	2.620	4.216	NM 404 west	Eastern terminus of NM 404; roundabout
	6.085	9.793	End of state maintenance	Northern terminus
1.000 mi = 1.609 km; 1.000 km = 0.621 mi

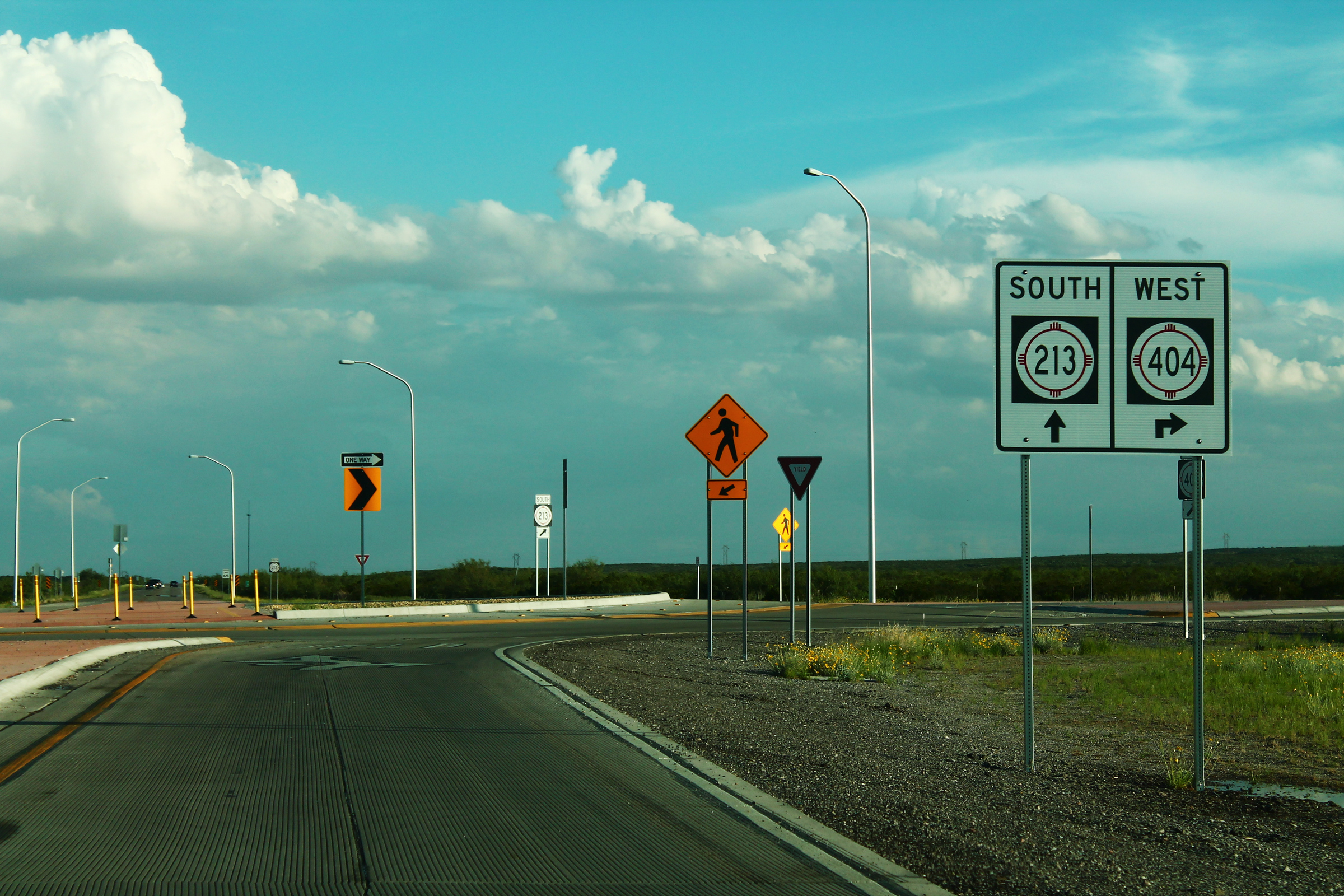
NM 213 approaching junction with NM 404
