= New Mexico State Road 272 =

State highway in New Mexico, United States

State Road 272
- NM 272 highlighted in red

Route information
- Maintained by NMDOT
- Length: 9.310 mi (14.983 km)

Major junctions
- Southern end: End of state maintenance
- Northern end: US 60 / US 84 near Fort Sumner

Location
- Country: United States
- State: New Mexico
- Counties: De Baca

Highway system
- New Mexico State Highway System; Interstate; US; State; Scenic
← NM 271	→ NM 273

State Road 272 (NM 272) is a 9.3-mile-long (15.0 km) state highway in the US state of New Mexico. NM 272's southern terminus is at the end of state route south of Fort Sumner State Monument, and the northern terminus is at U.S. Route 60 (US 60) and US 84 east of Fort Sumner.

== Major intersections ==
The entire route is in De Baca County.

Location	mi	km	Destinations	Notes
	0.000	0.000	US 60 / US 84	Northern terminus
	3.010	4.844	NM 212	
	5.500	8.851	NM 212 north	Southern terminus of NM 212
	9.310	14.983	End of state maintenance	Southern terminus
1.000 mi = 1.609 km; 1.000 km = 0.621 mi
