= Abo Canyon =

Mountain pass in New Mexico, United States

Coordinates: 34°26′08″N 106°27′32″W

Abo Pass
- Interactive map of Abo Pass
- Elevation: 5,771 ft (1,759 m)
- Traversed by: US 60, BNSF Railway
- Location: Socorro County, New Mexico, US
- Range: Manzano Mountains

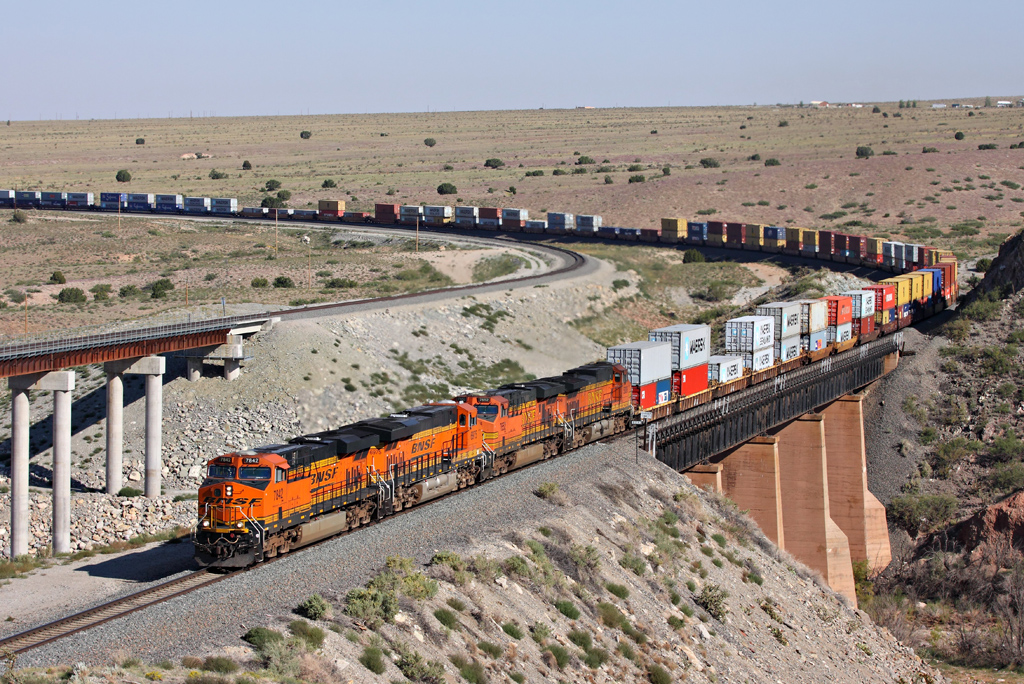
BNSF priority train enters Abo Canyon on the original AT&SF main. The new track through the canyon is on the left.

Abo Canyon (elevation 5771 ft.), also known as Abo Pass, is a canyon situated between the Manzano Mountains to the north and Los Pinos Mountains to the south. It is located in central New Mexico in the Southwest United States.

== History ==
From pre-Columbian times, the pass provided the most direct trading route through the mountains between Plains tribes such as the Abó, Gran Quivira, Quarai, and others located in the Estancia Valley to the east, and the Pueblo cultures of the Rio Grande to the west. The route these traders took led past Abo Pueblo, dating from the 14th century, strategically located near a cluster of springs on the eastern slope of the pass. Salt mined from nearby basins was one primary good traded along this trail, along with beans, cotton and buffalo meat. The old footpath is now the Abo Pass Trail Scenic Byway (see External links below).

The Spanish arrived in the 16th century, calling the area Las Bocas de Abo. They used this pass as a route between the Rio Grande valley and the three “salt missions” they constructed northeast of the pass, now ruins preserved as part of the Salinas Pueblo Missions National Monument.

Shortly after the United States' acquisition of New Mexico in 1846, US Congress authorized a search for a direct rail line through the nation. In 1853 a small military expedition of approximately 100 men occupied the area surveying the canyon.

== Railroad ==
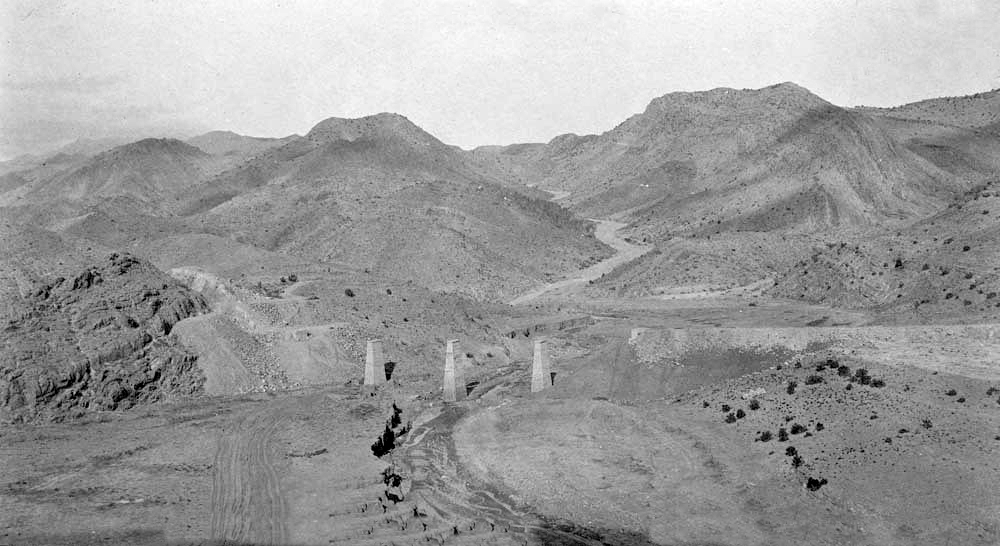
Construction of Atchison, Topeka and Santa Fe Railway bridge across Abo Canyon, circa 1905–1908. Sand Canyon is in background.

The Atchison Topeka and Santa Fe Railroad began construction in 1868, originating in Topeka, Kansas and expanding to the west through Colorado. The railroad, primarily used to facilitate the trade of buffalo hides and cattle, expanded south over Raton Pass and Glorieta Pass, reaching Santa Fe and Albuquerque in 1880.

In the early 20th century, the Atchison Topeka and Santa Fe Railroad wished to find an alternative route to its existing mainline over Raton and Glorieta Passes, to avoid the gradients of up to 3.5% on these passes. The company surveyed a route through the Abo Canyon, which could be achieved with a gradient of no more than 1.25%. Known as the Belen Cutoff, the route was completed in 1908, connecting to the AT&SF system at Belen, New Mexico and at Amarillo, Texas. The Cutoff rapidly took on the bulk of the AT&SF's transcontinental freight traffic; most of the Santa Fe's through passenger service remained on the old Raton Pass route, due to its connections in Colorado, as well as tourist traffic serving the railroad's namesake city. Passenger service through Abo Canyon ceased in 1971 with the cancellation of the San Francisco Chief, when Amtrak took over all of the Santa Fe's passenger operations.

Now part of the BNSF system and known as the Clovis subdivision of the Southern Transcon, the rail corridor is one of the most heavily trafficked routes in the western US. An average of almost 90 trains daily passed through Abo Canyon in 2006, each typically 6000 to 8000 feet in length.

The four-mile route through the canyon remained a single-track bottleneck until March 2011, when a second track was completed at a cost of $85 million. The BNSF project to expand this section of the railroad was scheduled to take 2.5 years and was completed ahead of time with zero reported injuries.

== Highway ==
The Atlantic and Pacific Highway was established through the pass in 1921, and was designated as U.S. Route 60 in 1931. New Mexico State Road 47 joins the highway from Belen on the west side of the pass.

== Other Infrastructure ==
In addition to the BNSF railroad and US Highway 60, two major electrical transmission lines and a natural gas transmission pipeline also pass through Abo Pass.

== Abo Pass Trail ==
On July 31, 1998, the Abo Pass Trail was made a New Mexico Scenic and Historic Byway. It is a 31 miles scenic drive through the Salt Missions area along New Mexico State Road 47 and U.S. Route 60. The route originally served as a Pueblo trade path to the eastern plains. Abo Pass Trail experienced high traffic in the 17th and 18th centuries as it connected traders and missionaries to the main route between Mexico and Santa Fe, the Camino Real.
