= Yeso Creek =

Stream in De Baca County, New Mexico, U.S.

Coordinates: 34.2273°N 104.2424°W

Yeso Creek is a stream in De Baca County, New Mexico, in the United States. It is a tributary of the Pecos River which it enters approximately 18 miles south of Fort Sumner.

Yeso is a name derived from the Spanish language meaning "gypsum".

== See also ==
- List of rivers of New Mexico
