= New Mexico State Road 212 =

State highway in New Mexico, United States

State Road 212

Route information
- Maintained by NMDOT
- Length: 4.100 mi (6.598 km)

Major junctions
- South end: NM 272
- North end: US 60 / US 84 near Fort Sumner

Location
- Country: United States
- State: New Mexico
- Counties: De Baca

Highway system
- New Mexico State Highway System; Interstate; US; State; Scenic
← NM 211	→ NM 213

State Road 212 (NM 212) is a 4.1-mile-long (6.6 km) state highway in the US state of New Mexico. NM 212's southern terminus is at NM 272, and the northern terminus is at U.S. Route 60 (US 60) and US 84 east of Fort Sumner

== Major intersections ==
The entire route is in De Baca County.

Location	mi	km	Destinations	Notes
	0.000	0.000	NM 272	Southern terminus
	2.500	4.023	NM 272	
Fort Sumner	4.100	6.598	US 60 / US 84	Northern terminus
1.000 mi = 1.609 km; 1.000 km = 0.621 mi
