= De Baca County, New Mexico =

County in New Mexico, United States

- County
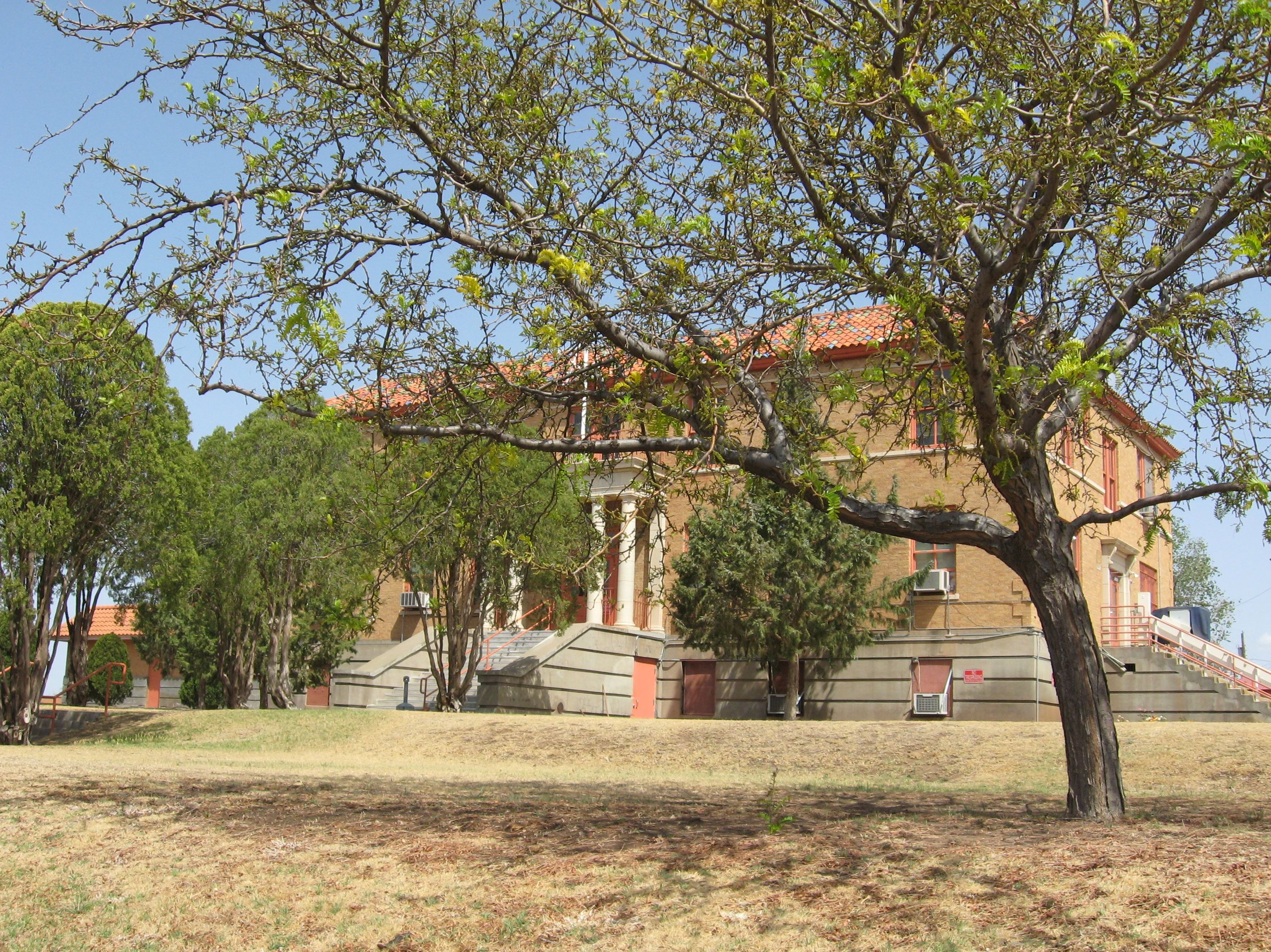
- De Baca County Courthouse in Fort Sumner

- Location within the U.S. state of New Mexico
- Coordinates: 34°28′18″N 104°14′44″W
- Country: United States
- State: New Mexico
- Founded: February 28, 1917
- Named for: Ezequiel Cabeza De Baca
- Seat: Fort Sumner
- Largest village: Fort Sumner

Area
  - Total: 2,334 sq mi (6,050 km^{2})
  - Land: 2,323 sq mi (6,020 km^{2})
  - Water: 11 sq mi (28 km^{2}) 0.5%

Population (2020)
  - Total: 1,698
  - Estimate (2025): 1,647 ▼
  - Density: 0.7310/sq mi (0.2822/km^{2})
- Time zone: UTC−7 (Mountain)
  - Summer (DST): UTC−6 (MDT)
- Congressional district: 2nd
- Website: debaca.nmgenweb.us

De Baca County is a county in the U.S. state of New Mexico. As of the 2020 census, the population was 1,698, making it New Mexico's second-least populous county. Its county seat is Fort Sumner. The county is named for Ezequiel Cabeza De Baca, the second elected Governor of New Mexico.

== Geography ==
According to the U.S. Census Bureau, the county has a total area of 2,334 square miles (6,050 km^{2}), of which 2,323 square miles (6,020 km^{2}) is land and 11 square miles (28 km^{2}) (0.5%) is water.

=== Adjacent counties ===
- Guadalupe County - north
- Quay County - northeast
- Roosevelt County - east
- Chaves County - south
- Lincoln County - west

== Demographics ==
Historical population
Census	Pop.	Note	%±
1920	3,196		—
1930	2,893		−9.5%
1940	3,725		28.8%
1950	3,464		−7.0%
1960	2,991		−13.7%
1970	2,547		−14.8%
1980	2,454		−3.7%
1990	2,252		−8.2%
2000	2,240		−0.5%
2010	2,022		−9.7%
2020	1,698		−16.0%
2025 (est.)	1,647	▼	−3.0%
U.S. Decennial Census; 1790-1960 1900-1990; 1990-2000 2010

=== 2020 census ===
As of the 2020 census, the county had a population of 1,698. The median age was 51.5 years; 19.9% of residents were under the age of 18 and 27.5% were 65 years of age or older. For every 100 females there were 98.1 males, and for every 100 females age 18 and over there were 98.8 males age 18 and over.

De Baca County, New Mexico – Racial and ethnic composition Note: the US Census treats Hispanic/Latino as an ethnic category. This table excludes Latinos from the racial categories and assigns them to a separate category. Hispanics/Latinos may be of any race.
Race / Ethnicity (NH = Non-Hispanic)	Pop 2000	Pop 2010	Pop 2020	% 2000	% 2010	% 2020
White alone (NH)	1,407	1,200	983	62.81%	59.35%	57.89%
Black or African American alone (NH)	1	2	3	0.04%	0.10%	0.18%
Native American or Alaska Native alone (NH)	13	9	4	0.58%	0.45%	0.24%
Asian alone (NH)	5	0	4	0.22%	0.00%	0.24%
Pacific Islander alone (NH)	0	0	4	0.00%	0.00%	0.24%
Other race alone (NH)	1	0	0	0.04%	0.00%	0.00%
Mixed race or Multiracial (NH)	23	32	46	1.03%	1.58%	2.71%
Hispanic or Latino (any race)	790	779	654	35.27%	38.53%	38.52%
Total	2,240	2,022	1,698	100.00%	100.00%	100.00%

The racial makeup of the county was 76.4% White, 0.5% Black or African American, 0.6% American Indian and Alaska Native, 0.6% Asian, 0.3% Native Hawaiian and Pacific Islander, 10.5% from some other race, and 11.1% from two or more races. Hispanic or Latino residents of any race comprised 38.5% of the population.

0.0% of residents lived in urban areas, while 100.0% lived in rural areas.

There were 770 households in the county, of which 25.6% had children under the age of 18 living with them and 26.0% had a female householder with no spouse or partner present. About 30.5% of all households were made up of individuals and 16.0% had someone living alone who was 65 years of age or older.

There were 1,125 housing units, of which 31.6% were vacant. Among occupied housing units, 74.9% were owner-occupied and 25.1% were renter-occupied. The homeowner vacancy rate was 3.7% and the rental vacancy rate was 11.1%.

=== 2010 census ===
As of the 2010 census, there were 2,022 people, 912 households, and 581 families living in the county. The population density was 0.9 inhabitants per square mile (0.35/km^{2}). There were 1,344 housing units at an average density of 0.6 per square mile (0.23/km^{2}). The racial makeup of the county was 87.3% white, 0.6% American Indian, 0.1% black or African American, 7.9% from other races, and 3.9% from two or more races. Those of Hispanic or Latino origin made up 38.5% of the population. In terms of ancestry, 17.5% were German, 13.7% were American, 9.6% were English, and 7.4% were Irish.

Of the 912 households, 27.3% had children under the age of 18 living with them, 50.7% were married couples living together, 8.3% had a female householder with no husband present, 36.3% were non-families, and 32.7% of all households were made up of individuals. The average household size was 2.21 and the average family size was 2.78. The median age was 47.8 years.

The median income for a household in the county was $30,643 and the median income for a family was $36,618. Males had a median income of $27,460 versus $20,980 for females. The per capita income for the county was $20,769. About 15.9% of families and 21.6% of the population were below the poverty line, including 39.0% of those under age 18 and 18.3% of those age 65 or over.

=== 2000 census ===
As of the 2000 census, there were 2,240 people, 922 households, and 614 families living in the county. The population density was 1 people per square mile (0.39 people/km^{2}). There were 1,307 housing units at an average density of 1 units per square mile (0.39/km^{2}). The racial makeup of the county was 84.02% White, 0.04% Black or African American, 0.94% Native American, 0.22% Asian, 12.54% from other races, and 2.23% from two or more races. 35.27% of the population were Hispanic or Latino of any race.

There were 922 households, out of which 27.20% had children under the age of 18 living with them, 56.60% were married couples living together, 7.30% had a female householder with no husband present, and 33.30% were non-families. 30.80% of all households were made up of individuals, and 18.00% had someone living alone who was 65 years of age or older. The average household size was 2.35 and the average family size was 2.96.

In the county, the population was spread out, with 24.10% under the age of 18, 5.70% from 18 to 24, 21.70% from 25 to 44, 23.20% from 45 to 64, and 25.40% who were 65 years of age or older. The median age was 44 years. For every 100 females there were 96.00 males. For every 100 females age 18 and over, there were 92.10 males.

The median income for a household in the county was $25,441, and the median income for a family was $32,870. Males had a median income of $25,833 versus $18,487 for females. The per capita income for the county was $14,065. 17.70% of the population and 13.60% of families were below the poverty line. Out of the total people living in poverty, 23.30% are under the age of 18 and 15.00% are 65 or older.

== Communities ==
=== Village ===
- Fort Sumner (county seat)

=== Census-designated place ===
- Lake Sumner

=== Unincorporated communities ===
- Agudo
- Buchanan
- Canton
- Cardenas
- Dunlap
- Evanola
- Ingleville
- La Lande
- Largo
- Ricardo
- Taiban
- Tolar
- Yeso

=== Ghost town ===
- Añal

== Education ==
The county has a single school district: Fort Sumner Municipal Schools.

== Notable people ==
- Billy the Kid was killed and buried in Fort Sumner, New Mexico
- Lucien Maxwell, mountain man, rancher, scout, businessman, land owner, and rancher
- Paulita Maxwell, daughter of Lucien and friend of Billy the Kid
- Fern Sawyer, cowgirl, rodeo champion, and politician

== Politics ==
In its early history, De Baca County was dominated by the Democratic Party. It began shifting Republican in the second half of the 20th century, only supporting a Democratic candidate 3 times after 1948. Since then, the Republican trend has gradually increased, with Donald Trump's 2024 performance being the best by a Republican in the county's history.

United States presidential election results for De Baca County, New Mexico
Year	Republican		Democratic		Third party(ies)	
Year	No.	%	No.	%	No.	%
1920	412	36.75%	693	61.82%	16	1.43%
1924	270	29.03%	574	61.72%	86	9.25%
1928	474	47.83%	514	51.87%	3	0.30%
1932	264	20.23%	1,023	78.39%	18	1.38%
1936	444	30.41%	1,010	69.18%	6	0.41%
1940	479	33.06%	970	66.94%	0	0.00%
1944	554	45.56%	660	54.28%	2	0.16%
1948	458	40.50%	670	59.24%	3	0.27%
1952	782	56.83%	591	42.95%	3	0.22%
1956	779	59.33%	528	40.21%	6	0.46%
1960	734	54.17%	619	45.68%	2	0.15%
1964	559	45.08%	674	54.35%	7	0.56%
1968	658	57.67%	345	30.24%	138	12.09%
1972	752	71.82%	270	25.79%	25	2.39%
1976	556	47.93%	597	51.47%	7	0.60%
1980	655	56.17%	484	41.51%	27	2.32%
1984	756	65.23%	386	33.30%	17	1.47%
1988	643	56.60%	480	42.25%	13	1.14%
1992	526	44.39%	451	38.06%	208	17.55%
1996	489	44.74%	509	46.57%	95	8.69%
2000	612	62.32%	349	35.54%	21	2.14%
2004	706	71.10%	281	28.30%	6	0.60%
2008	676	64.75%	359	34.39%	9	0.86%
2012	586	64.97%	287	31.82%	29	3.22%
2016	620	68.13%	193	21.21%	97	10.66%
2020	656	72.81%	231	25.64%	14	1.55%
2024	649	74.26%	206	23.57%	19	2.17%

== Transportation ==
=== Major highways ===
- US 60
- US 84
- US 285
- NM 20
- NM 203
- NM 212
- NM 247
- NM 252
- NM 272
- NM 294

== See also ==
- National Register of Historic Places listings in De Baca County, New Mexico
