= Yeso, New Mexico =

Unincorporated community in New Mexico, United States

- Unincorporated community
- Location within New Mexico
- Coordinates: 34°26′21″N 104°36′36″W
- Country: United States
- State: New Mexico
- County: De Baca
- Elevation: 4,771 ft (1,454 m)
- Time zone: UTC-7 (Mountain (MST))
  - Summer (DST): UTC-6 (MDT)
- Area code: 575
- GNIS feature ID: 900005

Yeso is an unincorporated community in De Baca County, New Mexico, United States, located along U.S. Route 60 west of Fort Sumner.

== History ==
The community took its name from nearby Yeso Creek. The post office has been in operation at Yeso since 1909.

Yeso was laid out in 1906 when the railroad was extended to that point. However, as the steam engine fell into decline, so did the community. Coupled with unsanitary drinking water, and closure of the school, the decline of the community led to its eventual abandoning in 1966, making it a ghost town.

== Climate ==
According to the Köppen Climate Classification system, Yeso has a cold semi-arid climate, abbreviated "BSk" on climate maps. The hottest temperature recorded in Yeso was 107 °F (41.7 °C) on July 7, 1973, June 24, 1978, and June 27, 1994, while the coldest temperature recorded was −23 °F (−30.6 °C) on January 13, 1963.

Climate data for Yeso, New Mexico, 1991–2020 normals, extremes 1960–present
| Month | Jan | Feb | Mar | Apr | May | Jun | Jul | Aug | Sep | Oct | Nov | Dec | Year |
|---|---|---|---|---|---|---|---|---|---|---|---|---|---|
| Record high °F (°C) | 78 (26) | 81 (27) | 96 (36) | 96 (36) | 100 (38) | 107 (42) | 107 (42) | 102 (39) | 100 (38) | 93 (34) | 89 (32) | 80 (27) | 107 (42) |
| Mean daily maximum °F (°C) | 53.2 (11.8) | 57.5 (14.2) | 65.3 (18.5) | 73.0 (22.8) | 81.2 (27.3) | 90.4 (32.4) | 91.3 (32.9) | 89.5 (31.9) | 82.6 (28.1) | 72.9 (22.7) | 62.0 (16.7) | 52.8 (11.6) | 72.6 (22.6) |
| Daily mean °F (°C) | 39.4 (4.1) | 42.8 (6.0) | 49.7 (9.8) | 56.9 (13.8) | 66.0 (18.9) | 75.1 (23.9) | 77.7 (25.4) | 75.9 (24.4) | 68.8 (20.4) | 58.6 (14.8) | 47.8 (8.8) | 39.7 (4.3) | 58.2 (14.6) |
| Mean daily minimum °F (°C) | 25.7 (−3.5) | 28.2 (−2.1) | 34.1 (1.2) | 40.8 (4.9) | 50.9 (10.5) | 59.8 (15.4) | 64.1 (17.8) | 62.4 (16.9) | 55.1 (12.8) | 44.3 (6.8) | 33.5 (0.8) | 26.5 (−3.1) | 43.8 (6.5) |
| Record low °F (°C) | −23 (−31) | −18 (−28) | −2 (−19) | 6 (−14) | 21 (−6) | 37 (3) | 47 (8) | 42 (6) | 29 (−2) | 12 (−11) | −8 (−22) | −11 (−24) | −23 (−31) |
| Average precipitation inches (mm) | 0.49 (12) | 0.27 (6.9) | 0.57 (14) | 0.78 (20) | 0.85 (22) | 1.21 (31) | 1.82 (46) | 1.17 (30) | 1.64 (42) | 1.38 (35) | 0.47 (12) | 0.58 (15) | 11.23 (285.9) |
| Average snowfall inches (cm) | 2.8 (7.1) | 2.5 (6.4) | 0.7 (1.8) | 0.2 (0.51) | 0.0 (0.0) | 0.0 (0.0) | 0.0 (0.0) | 0.0 (0.0) | 0.0 (0.0) | 0.5 (1.3) | 0.4 (1.0) | 3.4 (8.6) | 10.5 (26.71) |
| Average precipitation days (≥ 0.01 in) | 1.6 | 1.0 | 1.6 | 1.6 | 1.9 | 2.5 | 3.8 | 3.6 | 2.8 | 2.4 | 1.2 | 1.8 | 25.8 |
| Average snowy days (≥ 0.1 in) | 1.0 | 0.9 | 0.5 | 0.2 | 0.0 | 0.0 | 0.0 | 0.0 | 0.0 | 0.1 | 0.3 | 1.2 | 4.2 |
Source 1: NOAA
Source 2: xmACIS2

== See also ==
- List of ghost towns in New Mexico
