= Willard, New Mexico =

- Village
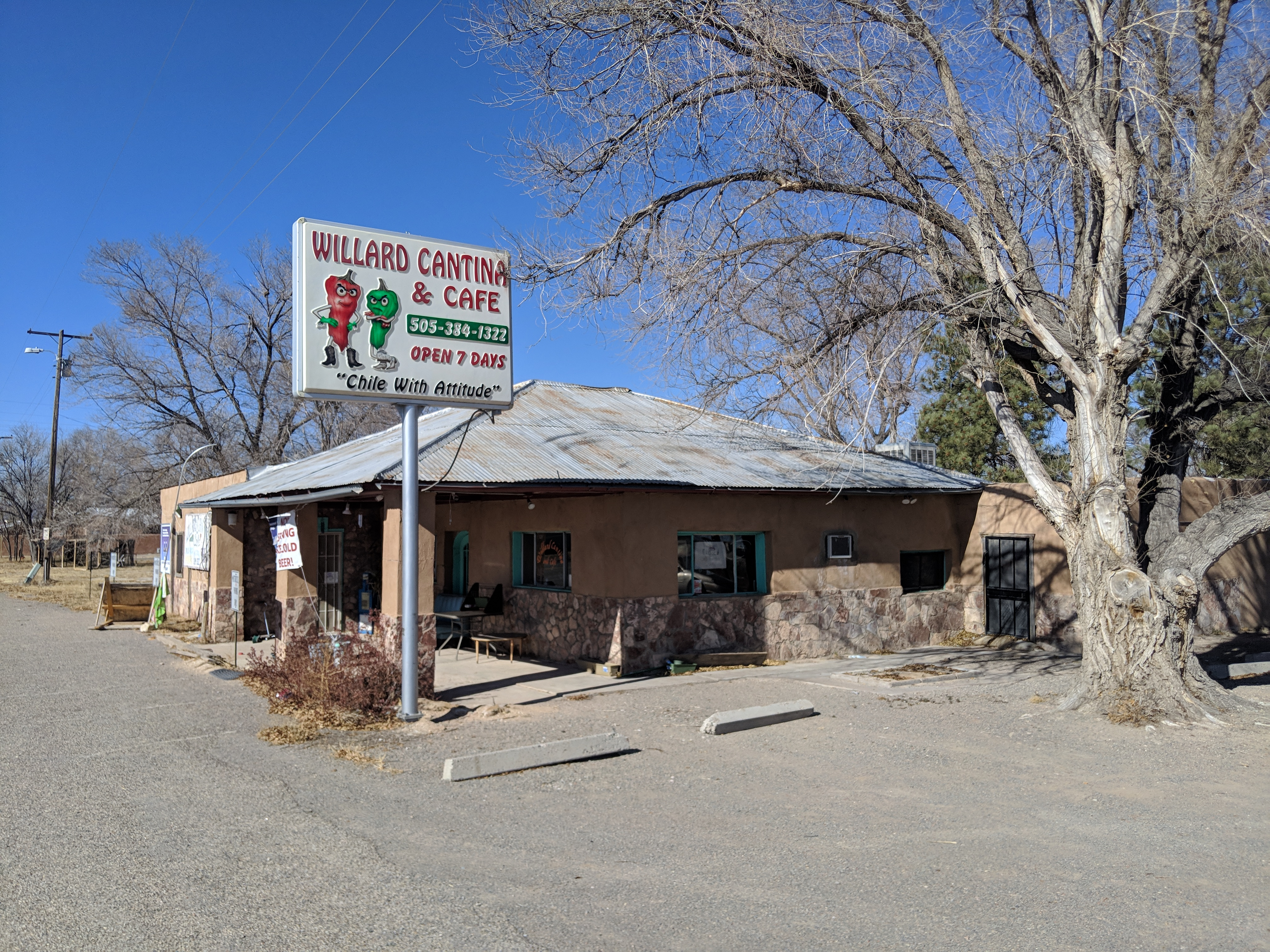
- Willard Cantina & Cafe

- Location of Willard, New Mexico

- Location in the United States
- Coordinates: 34°35′42″N 106°01′56″W
- Country: United States
- State: New Mexico
- County: Torrance

Area
  - Total: 0.92 sq mi (2.39 km^{2})
  - Land: 0.92 sq mi (2.39 km^{2})
  - Water: 0 sq mi (0.00 km^{2})
- Elevation: 6,099 ft (1,859 m)

Population (2020)
  - Total: 201
  - Density: 217.9/sq mi (84.14/km^{2})
- Time zone: UTC-7 (Mountain (MST))
  - Summer (DST): UTC-6 (MDT)
- ZIP code: 87063
- Area code: 505
- FIPS code: 35-85160
- GNIS feature ID: 2413601

Willard is a village in Torrance County, New Mexico, United States. As of the 2020 census, Willard had a population of 201. It is part of the Albuquerque Metropolitan Statistical Area. The village is not experiencing the same extreme growth that towns farther north in the state are. A wind farm has recently been constructed upon the mesa just south of the town.

== Geography ==
According to the United States Census Bureau, the village has a total area of 0.8 square miles (2.1 km^{2}), all land.

== Demographics ==
Historical population
| Census | Pop. | Note | %± |
|---|---|---|---|
| 1920 | 421 | | — |
| 1930 | 482 | | 14.5% |
| 1940 | 462 | | −4.1% |
| 1950 | 296 | | −35.9% |
| 1960 | 294 | | −0.7% |
| 1970 | 209 | | −28.9% |
| 1980 | 166 | | −20.6% |
| 1990 | 183 | | 10.2% |
| 2000 | 240 | | 31.1% |
| 2010 | 253 | | 5.4% |
| 2020 | 201 | | −20.6% |
U.S. Decennial Census

As of the census of 2000, there were 240 people, 96 households, and 60 families residing in the village. The population density was 310.5 inhabitants per square mile (119.9/km^{2}). There were 115 housing units at an average density of 148.8 per square mile (57.5/km^{2}). The racial makeup of the village was 50.42% White, 0.83% African American, 1.25% Native American, 45.83% from other races, and 1.67% from two or more races. Hispanic or Latino of any race were 83.33% of the population.

There were 96 households, out of which 33.3% had children under the age of 18 living with them, 47.9% were married couples living together, 8.3% had a female householder with no husband present, and 36.5% were non-families. 35.4% of all households were made up of individuals, and 16.7% had someone living alone who was 65 years of age or older. The average household size was 2.50 and the average family size was 3.28.

In the village, the population was spread out, with 28.8% under the age of 18, 9.6% from 18 to 24, 23.8% from 25 to 44, 21.3% from 45 to 64, and 16.7% who were 65 years of age or older. The median age was 36 years. For every 100 females, there were 110.5 males. For every 100 females age 18 and over, there were 106.0 males.

The median income for a household in the village was $20,833, and the median income for a family was $28,333. Males had a median income of $30,313 versus $21,000 for females. The per capita income for the village was $9,343. About 19.4% of families and 27.6% of the population were below the poverty line, including 31.0% of those under the age of eighteen and 35.6% of those 65 or over.

== See also ==
- List of municipalities in New Mexico
