= Taiban, New Mexico =

Unincorporated community in New Mexico, United States

- Unincorporated comumunity
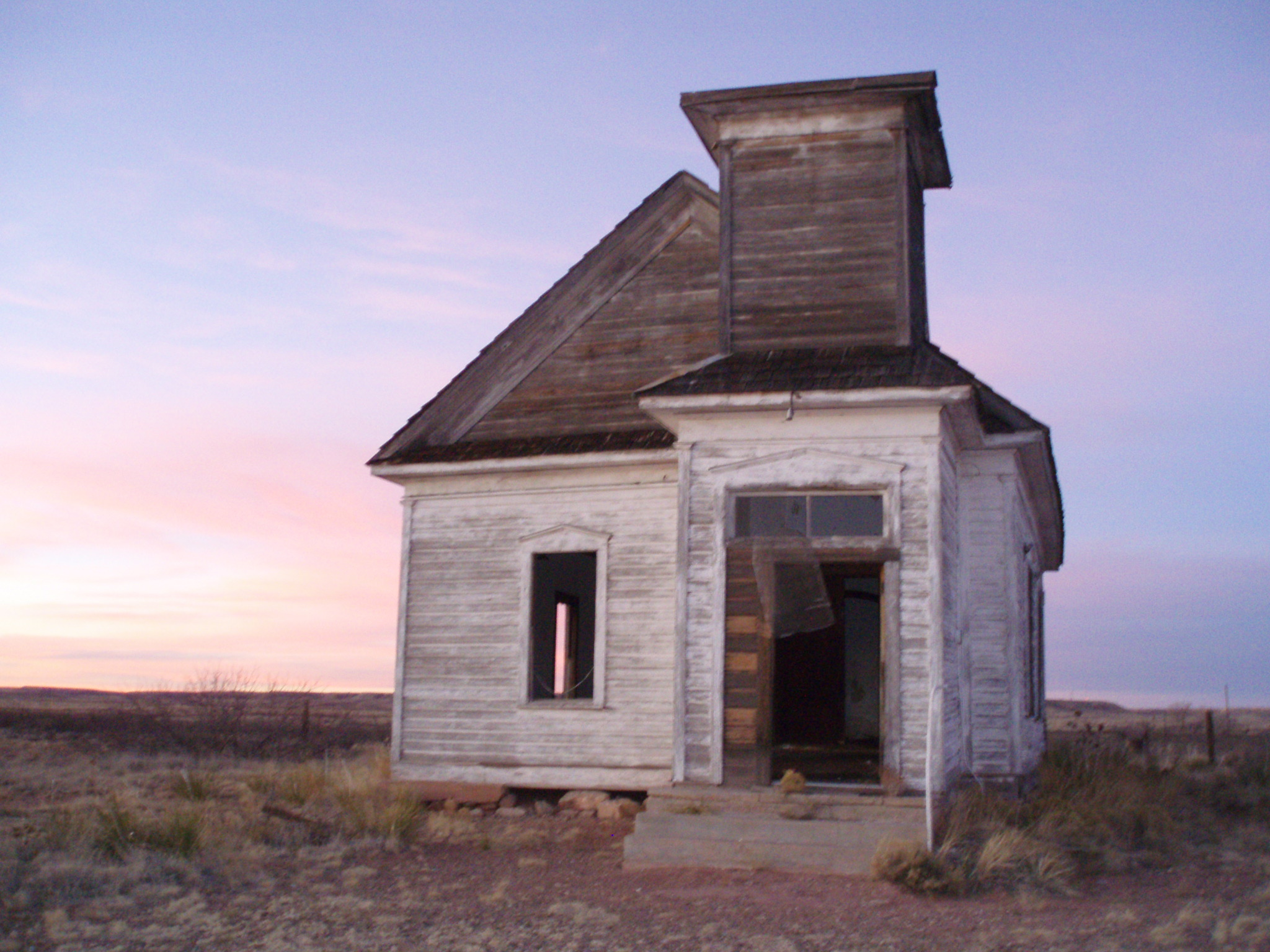
- The now-abandoned Taiban Presbyterian Church was built in 1908, February 2008.

- Location within New Mexico Location within the United States
- Coordinates: 34°26′24″N 104°00′33″W
- Country: United States
- State: New Mexico
- County: De Baca
- Elevation: 4,131 ft (1,259 m)
- Time zone: UTC-7 (Mountain (MST))
  - Summer (DST): UTC-6 (MDT)
- ZIP code: 88134
- Area code: 575
- GNIS feature ID: 899942

Taiban is an unincorporated community in De Baca County, New Mexico, United States.

== Description ==
The community is located on New Mexico State Road 252 at U.S. Routes 60 and 84. Founded in 1906 as a ranching community, it was named for nearby Taiban Creek.

The town is famous for being the location where Pat Garrett captured Billy the Kid and his associates on December 23, 1880.
