= 1968 United States presidential election in New Mexico =

- November 5, 1968

Nominee	Richard Nixon	Hubert Humphrey	George Wallace
Party	Republican	Democratic	American Independent
Home state	New York (Note: Although he was born in California and he served as a U.S. senator from California, in 1968 Richard Nixon's official state of residence was New York, because he moved there to practice law after his defeat in the 1962 California gubernatorial election. During his first term as president, Nixon re-established his residency in California. Consequently, most reliable reference books list Nixon's home state as New York in the 1968 election and his home state as California in the 1972 (and 1960) election.)	Minnesota	Alabama
Running mate	Spiro Agnew	Edmund Muskie	S. Marvin Griffin
Electoral vote	4	0	0
Popular vote	169,692	130,081	25,737
Percentage	51.85%	39.75%	7.86%
County results
Nixon
40–50%
50–60%
60–70%
Humphrey
40–50%
50–60%
President before election
Lyndon B. Johnson
Democratic
Elected President
Richard Nixon
Republican

The 1968 United States presidential election in New Mexico took place on November 5, 1968. All fifty states and The District of Columbia, were part of the 1968 United States presidential election. State voters chose four electors to represent them in the Electoral College, who voted for president and vice president.

New Mexico had been a long-time political bellwether, having supported the winning candidate in every presidential election since statehood in 1912. However, a definite Republican trend was detectable in 1964, when Goldwater was able to win a vote share two percent above his national mean and Johnson feared losing traditionally Southern Democratic "Little Texas".

The 1966 midterm elections saw the state join with larger "Sunbelt" dynamics and Democratic candidates for statewide offices would lose twelve percent or more of their previous vote share, in the process showing that Hispanic candidates were becoming a liability in Albuquerque and the east due to considerable in-migration, and legislative GOP percentages reached levels not observed for over four decades. Local issues of public school finance and land-grant claims for the Hispanic and Native American populations of the state proved a further liability for the incumbent Democratic Party. The issue of the stalemated Vietnam War was another problem for the Democratic Party in a state severely affected by poverty, and anti-war Eugene McCarthy gained substantial support among New Mexico Democrats before the assassination of Bobby Kennedy largely turned them toward eventual nominee Hubert Humphrey.

Incumbent Vice President Hubert Humphrey and segregationist American Independent Party candidate and former Governor of Alabama George Wallace campaigned in New Mexico during the autumn, whilst running mate Spiro Agnew did all the campaigning for Republican Richard Nixon in the state. Despite his failure to visit, New Mexico was won by former Vice President Nixon by a 12-point margin against Humphrey. Wallace, far from his base in the Deep South, did well among working and lower-middle class unionized workers and farmers in the "Little Texas" region, but received some of his poorest national percentages in the north-central highland regions – Mora County gave Wallace his eleventh-smallest vote share of any county in the country. Nixon was the first Republican to carry Lea and Eddy counties since 1928.

Nixon's victory was the first of six consecutive Republican victories in the state, as New Mexico would not vote for a Democratic candidate again until Bill Clinton in 1992, after which it has always gone Democratic except in 2004 when George W. Bush very narrowly won the state over John Kerry.

== Results ==
1968 United States presidential election in New Mexico
Party	Candidate	Votes	%	±%
Republican	Richard Nixon; Spiro Agnew	169,692	51.85%	+11.61
Democratic	Hubert Humphrey; Edmund Muskie	130,081	39.75%	−19.47
American Independent	George Wallace; Marvin Griffin	25,737	7.86%	N/A
People's Constitutional	Ventura Chavez; Adelico Moya	1,519	0.46%	N/A
Socialist Workers	Fred Halstead; Paul Boutelle	252	0.08%	N/A
Total votes		327,281	100.00%	
Republican win				

=== Results by county ===
County	Richard Nixon Republican		Hubert Humphrey Democratic		George Wallace American Independent		Various candidates Other parties		Margin		Total votes cast
County	#	%	#	%	#	%	#	%	#	%	Total votes cast
Bernalillo	56,234	54.96%	40,835	39.91%	4,920	4.81%	332	0.32%	15,399	15.05%	102,321
Catron	674	62.29%	278	25.69%	128	11.83%	2	0.18%	396	36.60%	1,082
Chaves	8,866	63.61%	3,612	25.91%	1,425	10.22%	35	0.25%	5,254	37.70%	13,938
Colfax	2,212	44.39%	2,477	49.71%	263	5.28%	31	0.62%	-265	-5.32%	4,983
Curry	5,562	53.99%	2,915	28.30%	1,754	17.03%	71	0.69%	2,647	25.69%	10,302
De Baca	658	57.67%	345	30.24%	130	11.39%	8	0.70%	313	27.43%	1,141
Doña Ana	10,824	54.15%	7,658	38.31%	1,453	7.27%	55	0.28%	3,166	15.84%	19,990
Eddy	7,193	47.74%	6,093	40.44%	1,671	11.09%	109	0.72%	1,100	7.30%	15,066
Grant	2,908	38.52%	3,817	50.56%	793	10.50%	31	0.41%	-909	-12.04%	7,549
Guadalupe	1,176	51.42%	1,027	44.91%	77	3.37%	7	0.31%	149	6.51%	2,287
Harding	450	57.69%	284	36.41%	44	5.64%	2	0.26%	166	21.28%	780
Hidalgo	606	39.25%	678	43.91%	257	16.65%	3	0.19%	-72	-4.66%	1,544
Lea	7,415	48.21%	4,751	30.89%	3,025	19.67%	191	1.24%	2,664	17.32%	15,382
Lincoln	2,004	64.52%	802	25.82%	287	9.24%	13	0.42%	1,202	38.70%	3,106
Los Alamos	3,447	54.92%	2,552	40.66%	268	4.27%	9	0.14%	895	14.26%	6,276
Luna	1,952	50.10%	1,438	36.91%	490	12.58%	16	0.41%	514	13.19%	3,896
McKinley	4,376	45.71%	4,491	46.91%	547	5.71%	159	1.66%	-115	-1.20%	9,573
Mora	1,155	50.97%	1,069	47.18%	35	1.54%	7	0.31%	86	3.79%	2,266
Otero	4,475	43.77%	3,978	38.91%	1,688	16.51%	83	0.81%	497	4.86%	10,224
Quay	2,123	51.38%	1,399	33.86%	567	13.72%	43	1.04%	724	17.52%	4,132
Rio Arriba	3,935	43.23%	4,799	52.72%	269	2.96%	99	1.09%	-864	-9.49%	9,102
Roosevelt	3,256	58.11%	1,547	27.61%	773	13.80%	27	0.48%	1,709	30.50%	5,603
San Juan	7,664	54.03%	4,036	28.45%	2,304	16.24%	181	1.28%	3,628	25.58%	14,185
San Miguel	4,027	48.12%	4,088	48.85%	195	2.33%	58	0.69%	-61	-0.73%	8,368
Sandoval	1,959	41.43%	2,609	55.18%	129	2.73%	31	0.66%	-650	-13.75%	4,728
Santa Fe	9,359	48.12%	9,544	49.07%	492	2.53%	54	0.28%	-185	-0.95%	19,449
Sierra	1,624	57.06%	930	32.68%	282	9.91%	10	0.35%	694	24.38%	2,846
Socorro	2,230	52.07%	1,871	43.68%	173	4.04%	9	0.21%	359	8.39%	4,283
Taos	3,119	49.89%	2,993	47.87%	124	1.98%	16	0.26%	126	2.02%	6,252
Torrance	1,316	52.98%	974	39.21%	188	7.57%	6	0.24%	342	13.77%	2,484
Union	1,217	55.42%	678	30.87%	279	12.70%	22	1.00%	539	24.55%	2,196
Valencia	5,676	47.51%	5,513	46.15%	707	5.92%	51	0.43%	163	1.36%	11,947
Totals	169,692	51.85%	130,081	39.75%	25,737	7.86%	1,771	0.54%	39,611	12.10%	327,281

==== Counties that flipped from Democratic to Republican ====
- Bernalillo
- Curry
- Lea
- Luna
- Quay
- Roosevelt
- De Baca
- Valencia
- Taos
- Mora
- Otero
- Guadalupe
- Eddy
- Socorro
- Torrance
- Los Alamos
- Doña Ana
- Chaves
- Sierra
- San Juan
- Catron

=== Results by congressional district ===
This table shows the results by congressional district. Nixon won both of New Mexico's congressional districts. The candidates are listed based on what place they got nationally.

District	Nixon	Humphrey	Wallace
1st	52.4%	43.1%	4.5%
2nd	51.8%	36.4%	11.9%
