= List of New Mexico locations by per capita income =

New Mexico has the fifth lowest per capita income in the United States of America, at $17,261 (2000). Its personal per capita income is $25,541 (2003).

== New Mexico counties ranked by per capita income ==
Note: Data is from the 2010 United States Census Data and the 2006-2010 American Community Survey 5-Year Estimates.

Rank	County	Per capita income	Median household income	Median family income	Population	Number of households
1	Los Alamos	$49,474	$103,643	$118,993	17,950	7,663
2	Santa Fe	$32,188	$52,696	$64,041	144,170	61,963
	United States	$27,334	$51,914	$62,982	308,745,538	116,716,292
3	Bernalillo	$26,143	$47,481	$59,809	662,564	266,000
4	Sandoval	$25,979	$57,158	$65,906	131,561	47,602
5	Eddy	$24,587	$46,583	$56,646	53,829	20,411
6	Lincoln	$24,290	$43,750	$53,871	20,497	9,219
	New Mexico	$22,966	$43,820	$52,565	2,059,179	791,395
7	Taos	$22,145	$35,441	$43,236	32,937	14,806
8	Mora	$22,035	$37,784	$42,122	4,881	2,114
9	Grant	$21,164	$36,591	$44,360	29,514	12,586
10	Colfax	$21,047	$39,216	$48,450	13,750	6,011
11	Catron	$20,895	$31,914	$40,906	3,725	1,787
12	De Baca	$20,769	$30,643	$36,618	2,022	912
13	San Juan	$20,725	$46,189	$53,540	130,044	44,404
14	Valencia	$19,955	$42,044	$48,767	76,569	27,500
15	Curry	$19,925	$38,090	$48,933	48,376	18,015
16	Rio Arriba	$19,913	$41,437	$47,840	40,246	15,768
17	Lea	$19,637	$43,910	$48,980	64,727	22,236
18	Otero	$19,255	$39,615	$46,210	63,797	24,464
19	Union	$19,228	$39,975	$41,687	4,549	1,695
20	San Miguel	$18,508	$32,213	$42,888	29,393	11,978
21	Chaves	$18,504	$37,524	$43,464	65,645	23,691
22	Doña Ana	$18,315	$36,657	$43,184	209,233	75,532
23	Quay	$18,234	$28,773	$41,766	9,041	4,072
24	Socorro	$17,801	$33,284	$41,964	17,866	7,014
25	Hidalgo	$17,451	$36,733	$41,594	4,894	1,936
26	Torrance	$17,278	$37,117	$43,914	16,383	6,264
27	Roosevelt	$16,933	$37,762	$43,536	19,846	7,299
28	Sierra	$16,667	$25,583	$38,641	11,988	5,917
29	Luna	$15,687	$27,997	$33,312	25,095	9,593
30	Cibola	$14,712	$37,361	$41,187	27,213	8,860
31	Harding	$14,684	$33,750	$56,563	695	349
32	Guadalupe	$13,710	$28,488	$37,535	4,687	1,766
33	McKinley	$12,932	$31,335	$37,345	71,492	21,968
