= 1980 United States presidential election in New Mexico =

- November 4, 1980

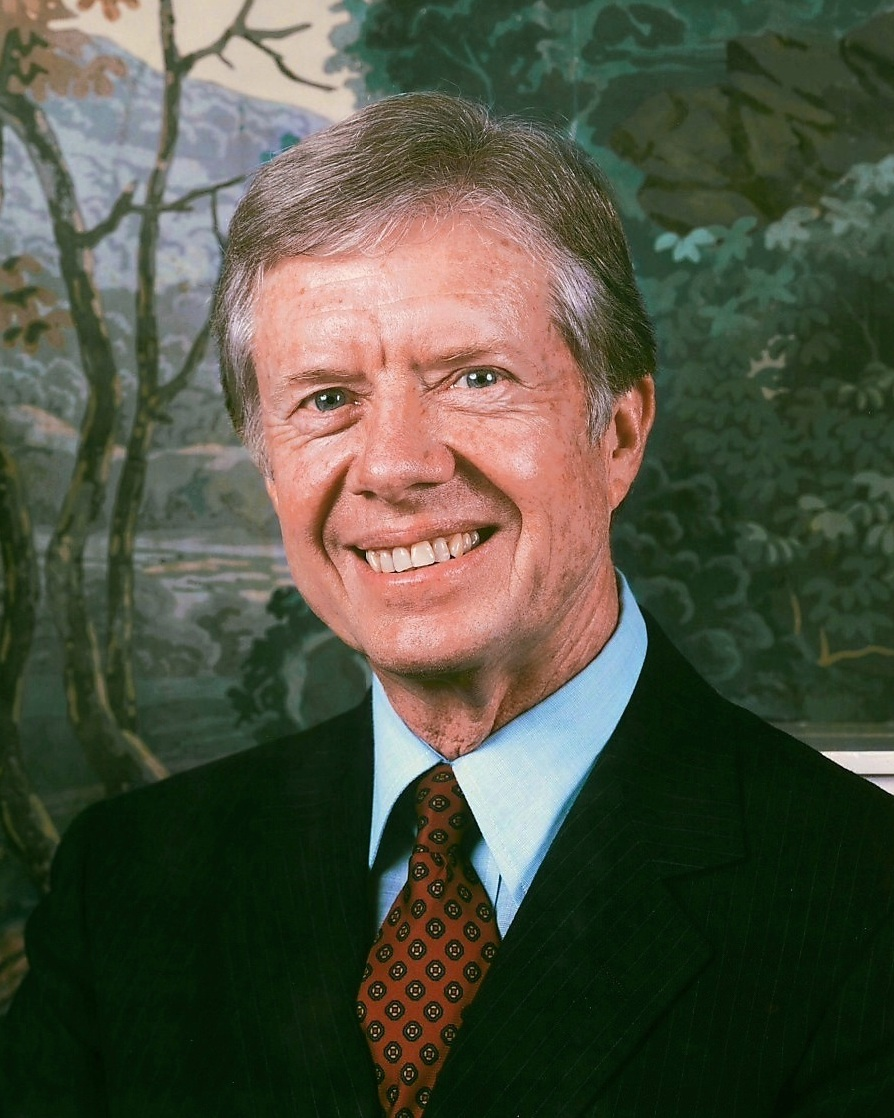

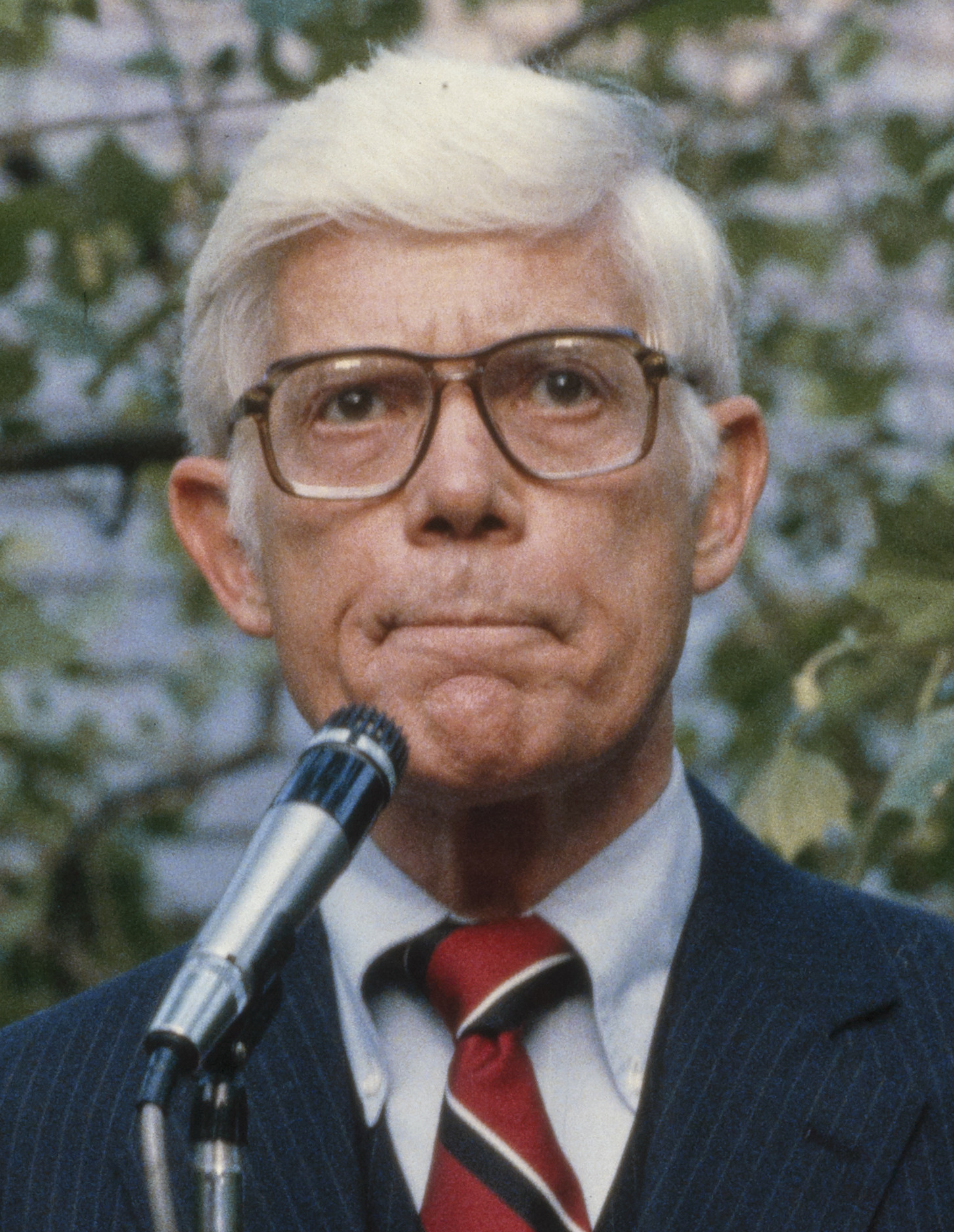
Nominee	Ronald Reagan	Jimmy Carter	John B. Anderson
Party	Republican	Democratic	Independent
Home state	California	Georgia	Illinois
Running mate	George H. W. Bush	Walter Mondale	Patrick Lucey
Electoral vote	4	0	0
Popular vote	250,779	167,826	29,459
Percentage	54.97%	36.78%	6.46%
County results
Reagan
40–50%
50–60%
60–70%
Carter
40–50%
50–60%
President before election
Jimmy Carter
Democratic
Elected President
Ronald Reagan
Republican

The 1980 United States presidential election in New Mexico took place on November 4, 1980. All 50 states and The District of Columbia, were part of the 1980 United States presidential election. State voters chose four electors to the Electoral College, who voted for president and vice president.

New Mexico was won by former California Governor Ronald Reagan by an 18-point landslide. President of the United States Jimmy Carter failed to gain reelection against Reagan. New Mexico election results reflect the Republican Party's re-consolidation under what is popularly called the "Reagan Revolution," which sounded overwhelming conservative electoral victories across the United States. As of the 2024 presidential election, this is the last time when McKinley County and Grant County voted for a Republican presidential candidate. To date, Jimmy Carter remains the only Democrat to have been elected president without ever winning the state of New Mexico in an election since the state’s founding. He is also the first of only two presidents to have held office to have never won the state with Donald Trump having lost the state consecutively in 2016, 2020, and 2024.

== Results ==
1980 United States presidential election in New Mexico
Party	Candidate	Votes	%	±%
Republican	Ronald Reagan; George H. W. Bush	250,779	54.97%	+4.22
Democratic	Jimmy Carter (incumbent); Walter Mondale (incumbent)	167,826	36.78%	−11.50
Independent	John B. Anderson; Patrick Lucey	29,459	6.46%	N/A
Libertarian	Ed Clark; David Koch	4,365	0.96%	+0.69
Citizens	Barry Commoner; LaDonna Harris	2,202	0.48%	N/A
Statesman	Benjamin Bubar Jr.; Earl Dodge	1,281	0.28%	+0.23
Socialist Workers	Andrew Pulley; Matilde Zimmermann	325	0.07%	−0.52
Total votes		456,237	100.00%	
Republican win				

=== Results by county ===
County	Ronald Reagan Republican		Jimmy Carter Democratic		John B. Anderson Independent		Various candidates Other parties		Margin		Total votes cast
County	#	%	#	%	#	%	#	%	#	%	Total votes cast
Bernalillo	83,956	53.45%	54,841	34.92%	15,118	9.63%	3,148	2.00%	29,115	18.53%	157,063
Catron	906	62.74%	466	32.27%	40	2.77%	32	2.22%	440	30.47%	1,444
Chaves	12,502	67.24%	5,350	28.77%	543	2.92%	199	1.07%	7,152	38.47%	18,594
Colfax	2,537	49.88%	2,266	44.55%	199	3.91%	84	1.65%	271	5.33%	5,086
Curry	8,132	67.37%	3,622	30.01%	183	1.52%	133	1.10%	4,510	37.36%	12,070
De Baca	655	56.17%	484	41.51%	14	1.20%	13	1.11%	171	14.66%	1,166
Dona Ana	15,539	53.92%	10,839	37.61%	1,863	6.46%	579	2.01%	4,700	16.31%	28,820
Eddy	9,817	56.55%	7,028	40.49%	326	1.88%	188	1.08%	2,789	16.06%	17,359
Grant	4,628	47.41%	4,600	47.13%	349	3.58%	184	1.89%	28	0.28%	9,761
Guadalupe	1,065	49.65%	980	45.69%	58	2.70%	42	1.96%	85	3.96%	2,145
Harding	356	59.23%	225	37.44%	14	2.33%	6	1.00%	131	21.79%	601
Hidalgo	1,059	53.19%	840	42.19%	59	2.96%	33	1.66%	219	11.00%	1,991
Lea	10,727	66.28%	5,006	30.93%	298	1.84%	154	0.95%	5,721	35.35%	16,185
Lincoln	3,009	68.79%	1,127	25.77%	172	3.93%	66	1.51%	1,882	43.02%	4,374
Los Alamos	5,460	58.19%	2,368	25.24%	1,388	14.79%	167	1.78%	3,092	32.95%	9,383
Luna	3,636	57.30%	2,443	38.50%	157	2.47%	110	1.73%	1,193	18.80%	6,346
McKinley	7,329	56.66%	4,869	37.64%	498	3.85%	238	1.84%	2,460	19.02%	12,934
Mora	1,037	43.48%	1,274	53.42%	44	1.84%	30	1.26%	-237	-9.94%	2,385
Otero	7,210	60.26%	4,111	34.36%	478	3.99%	166	1.39%	3,099	25.90%	11,965
Quay	2,499	62.09%	1,422	35.33%	58	1.44%	46	1.14%	1,077	26.76%	4,025
Rio Arriba	3,794	35.82%	6,245	58.97%	379	3.58%	173	1.63%	-2,451	-23.15%	10,591
Roosevelt	3,950	60.92%	2,240	34.55%	208	3.21%	86	1.33%	1,710	26.37%	6,484
San Juan	15,579	66.30%	6,705	28.53%	741	3.15%	474	2.02%	8,874	37.77%	23,499
San Miguel	3,292	39.34%	4,514	53.94%	416	4.97%	147	1.76%	-1,222	-14.60%	8,369
Sandoval	6,762	53.74%	4,740	37.67%	789	6.27%	291	2.31%	2,022	16.07%	12,582
Santa Fe	12,361	42.86%	12,658	43.89%	3,123	10.83%	696	2.41%	-297	-1.03%	28,838
Sierra	2,222	62.50%	1,169	32.88%	117	3.29%	47	1.32%	1,053	29.62%	3,555
Socorro	2,685	49.52%	2,226	41.05%	387	7.14%	124	2.29%	459	8.47%	5,422
Taos	3,584	41.67%	4,346	50.53%	482	5.60%	189	2.20%	-762	-8.86%	8,601
Torrance	1,907	57.42%	1,261	37.97%	101	3.04%	52	1.57%	646	19.45%	3,321
Union	1,407	65.87%	675	31.60%	32	1.50%	22	1.03%	732	34.27%	2,136
Valencia	11,177	58.39%	6,886	35.97%	825	4.31%	254	1.33%	4,291	22.42%	19,142
Totals	250,779	54.97%	167,826	36.78%	29,459	6.46%	8,173	1.79%	82,953	18.19%	456,237

==== Counties that flipped from Democratic to Republican ====
- Colfax
- De Baca
- Eddy
- Grant
- Guadalupe
- Hidalgo
- McKinley
- Quay
- Sandoval
- Socorro
- Torrance
- Valencia
