= Mountain View, New Mexico =

Mountain View may refer to the following places in New Mexico:

- Mountain View, Chaves County, New Mexico, an unincorporated community
- Mountain View, Cibola County, New Mexico, a census-designated place
- Mountain View, Luna County, New Mexico, a census-designated place
