= 1964 United States presidential election in New Mexico =

- November 3, 1964

Nominee	Lyndon B. Johnson	Barry Goldwater
Party	Democratic	Republican
Home state	Texas	Arizona
Running mate	Hubert Humphrey	William E. Miller
Electoral vote	4	0
Popular vote	194,017	131,838
Percentage	59.22%	40.24%
County results
Johnson
40–50%
50–60%
60–70%
70–80%
Goldwater
50–60%
President before election
Lyndon B. Johnson
Democratic
Elected President
Lyndon B. Johnson
Democratic

The 1964 United States presidential election in New Mexico took place on November 3, 1964. All fifty states and The District of Columbia, were part of the 1964 United States presidential election. State voters chose four electors to represent them in the Electoral College, who voted for president and vice president.

New Mexico was won by President Lyndon B. Johnson in a 19-point landslide. Johnson had won after serving as president for one year following the Assassination of John F. Kennedy. Arizona Senator Barry Goldwater lost most of the United States in this election, except for his home state and portions of the American South. Goldwater won only three counties: the Plains counties of Union and Harding, which as of the 2024 presidential election have never voted Democratic since 1948, and Lincoln County, which has never voted Democratic since 1936. Even in these, Goldwater won only narrowly: his highest proportion of the vote was only 52.55 percent in Lincoln County. Four other normally reliably Republican counties – San Juan, Curry, Chaves and Catron – were narrowly won by Johnson and have never voted for a Democrat since. This is also the last time the southeastern counties of Roosevelt, Otero and Lea have voted Democratic. This would be the last occasion until 2008 that a Democratic presidential nominee would carry Los Alamos County. New Mexico as a whole, along with Bernalillo, Doña Ana, Luna, and Sierra counties would not vote Democratic again until 1992, after which the state has always gone Democratic except in 2004 when George W. Bush very narrowly won the state over John Kerry.

At the other extreme, Grant and Sandoval Counties both gave Johnson over seventy percent of the vote, and the populous counties of Santa Fe and Taos also gave him over two-thirds.

== Results ==
1964 United States presidential election in New Mexico
Party	Candidate	Votes	%	±%
Democratic	Lyndon B. Johnson (incumbent); Hubert Humphrey	194,017	59.22%	+9.07
Republican	Barry Goldwater; William E. Miller	131,838	40.24%	−9.17
Socialist Labor	Eric Hass; Henning A. Blomen	1,217	0.37%	+0.19
Prohibition	E. Harold Munn; Mark R. Shaw	543	0.17%	−0.08
Total votes		327,615	100.00%	
Democratic win				

=== Results by county ===
County	Lyndon B. Johnson Democratic		Barry Goldwater Republican		Eric Hass Socialist Labor		E. Harold Munn Prohibition		Margin		Total votes cast
County	#	%	#	%	#	%	#	%	#	%	Total votes cast
Bernalillo	55,036	55.98%	42,583	43.31%	624	0.63%	74	0.08%	12,453	12.67%	98,317
Catron	624	51.66%	584	48.34%	0	0.00%	0	0.00%	40	3.32%	1,208
Chaves	8,650	50.55%	8,419	49.20%	29	0.17%	14	0.08%	231	1.35%	17,112
Colfax	3,367	66.95%	1,636	32.53%	8	0.16%	18	0.36%	1,731	34.42%	5,029
Curry	5,228	50.38%	5,120	49.34%	14	0.13%	16	0.15%	108	1.04%	10,378
De Baca	674	54.35%	559	45.08%	3	0.24%	4	0.32%	115	9.27%	1,240
Dona Ana	10,748	59.43%	7,280	40.25%	42	0.23%	15	0.08%	3,468	19.18%	18,085
Eddy	11,216	62.20%	6,747	37.42%	45	0.25%	24	0.13%	4,469	24.78%	18,032
Grant	5,253	71.82%	2,042	27.92%	12	0.16%	7	0.10%	3,211	43.90%	7,314
Guadalupe	1,649	60.78%	1,058	39.00%	2	0.07%	4	0.15%	591	21.78%	2,713
Harding	431	47.62%	473	52.27%	1	0.11%	0	0.00%	-42	-4.65%	905
Hidalgo	995	60.89%	628	38.43%	8	0.49%	3	0.18%	367	22.46%	1,634
Lea	8,862	55.57%	7,033	44.10%	36	0.23%	17	0.11%	1,829	11.47%	15,948
Lincoln	1,565	46.70%	1,761	52.55%	13	0.39%	12	0.36%	-196	-5.85%	3,351
Los Alamos	3,767	66.23%	1,895	33.32%	6	0.11%	20	0.35%	1,872	32.91%	5,688
Luna	2,286	57.60%	1,665	41.95%	12	0.30%	6	0.15%	621	15.65%	3,969
McKinley	6,913	69.13%	2,965	29.65%	64	0.64%	58	0.58%	3,948	39.48%	10,000
Mora	1,509	59.72%	1,014	40.13%	2	0.08%	2	0.08%	495	19.59%	2,525
Otero	6,035	63.13%	3,498	36.59%	13	0.14%	14	0.15%	2,537	26.54%	9,560
Quay	2,333	51.67%	2,161	47.86%	13	0.29%	8	0.18%	172	3.81%	4,515
Rio Arriba	6,787	69.56%	2,906	29.78%	32	0.33%	32	0.33%	3,881	39.78%	9,757
Roosevelt	2,875	51.03%	2,732	48.49%	20	0.35%	7	0.12%	143	2.54%	5,634
San Juan	6,901	49.68%	6,808	49.01%	86	0.62%	97	0.70%	93	0.67%	13,892
San Miguel	5,767	67.81%	2,714	31.91%	20	0.24%	4	0.05%	3,053	35.90%	8,505
Sandoval	3,332	75.38%	1,077	24.37%	10	0.23%	1	0.02%	2,255	51.01%	4,420
Santa Fe	12,616	68.12%	5,834	31.50%	35	0.19%	34	0.18%	6,782	36.62%	18,519
Sierra	1,633	51.86%	1,501	47.67%	12	0.38%	3	0.10%	132	4.19%	3,149
Socorro	2,397	57.33%	1,774	42.43%	5	0.12%	5	0.12%	623	14.90%	4,181
Taos	4,204	67.39%	2,006	32.16%	10	0.16%	18	0.29%	2,198	35.23%	6,238
Torrance	1,446	54.88%	1,183	44.90%	3	0.11%	3	0.11%	263	9.98%	2,635
Union	1,159	48.27%	1,232	51.31%	7	0.29%	3	0.12%	-73	-3.04%	2,401
Valencia	7,757	65.98%	3,950	33.60%	30	0.26%	20	0.17%	3,807	32.38%	11,757
Totals	194,017	59.22%	131,838	40.24%	1,217	0.37%	543	0.17%	62,179	18.98%	327,615

==== Counties that flipped from Republican to Democratic ====
- Bernalillo
- Curry
- Quay
- Roosevelt
- De Baca
- Torrance
- Chaves
- Sierra
- San Juan
- Catron
