= 2012 United States presidential election in New Mexico =

- November 6, 2012

Nominee	Barack Obama	Mitt Romney
Party	Democratic	Republican
Home state	Illinois	Massachusetts
Running mate	Joe Biden	Paul Ryan
Electoral vote	5	0
Popular vote	415,335	335,788
Percentage	52.99%	42.84%

Obama
40–50%
50–60%
60–70%
70–80%
Romney
40–50%
50–60%
60–70%
70–80%
President before election
Barack Obama
Democratic
Elected President
Barack Obama
Democratic

The 2012 United States presidential election in New Mexico took place on November 6, 2012, as part of the 2012 United States presidential election in which all 50 states plus the District of Columbia participated. This was the 25th U.S. presidential election in which New Mexico participated. New Mexico voters chose five electors to represent them in the Electoral College via a popular vote pitting incumbent Democratic President Barack Obama and his running mate, Vice President Joe Biden, against Republican challenger and former Massachusetts Governor Mitt Romney and his running mate, Congressman Paul Ryan.

Prior to the election, 17 news organizations considered this a state Obama would win, or otherwise considered as a safe blue state. President Obama and Vice President Biden carried New Mexico with 52.99% of the vote to Mitt Romney's 42.84%, a victory margin of 10.15%. Libertarian Gary Johnson, a former Republican who served two terms as Governor of New Mexico from 1995 to 2003, garnered 3.55% of the vote, his strongest statewide performance in the nation, and the strongest 3rd party showing in the state since 2000 (although that was easily surpassed by Johnson in 2016, when he received nearly 10% of the vote in New Mexico).

As of the 2024 presidential election, this is the last time where Colfax County, Hidalgo County, and Valencia County voted for the Democratic candidate. (Valencia County picked Donald Trump, Obama's successor, in both his 2016 win and 2020 loss, thus ending its reputation as a pivotal bellwether in presidential elections.) Since its statehood in 1912, no incumbent president of either party has ever won another term in office without carrying New Mexico. This is the last time that the presidential candidate who carried New Mexico won a majority of New Mexico's counties.

== Caucuses and primaries ==
=== Democratic caucuses ===
The Democratic caucus in New Mexico was uncontested as no one challenged incumbent President Barack Obama for the nomination. As a result, all of the state's 50 delegates were allocated to Obama.

=== Republican primary ===
2012 New Mexico Republican primary
- June 5, 2012

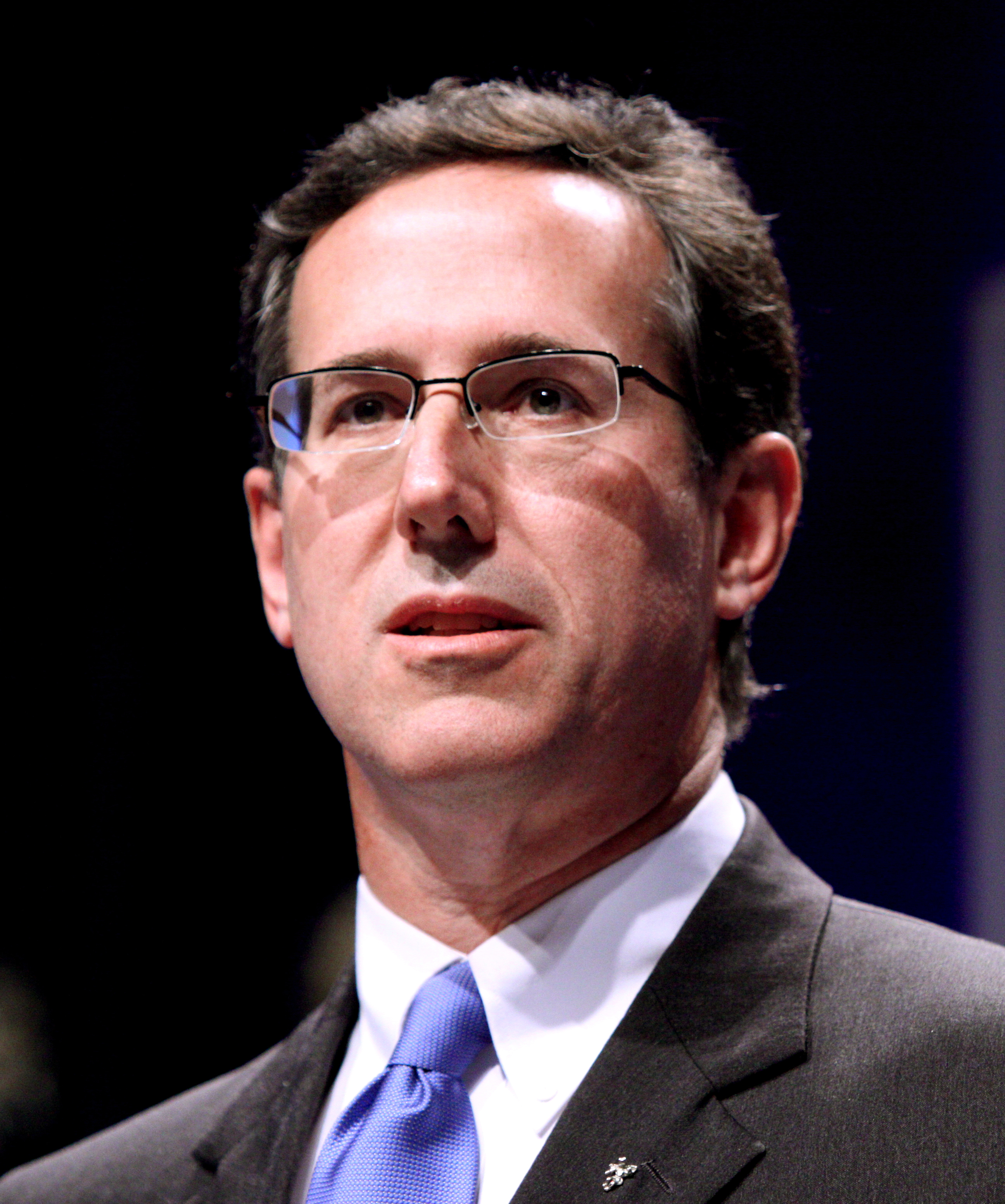

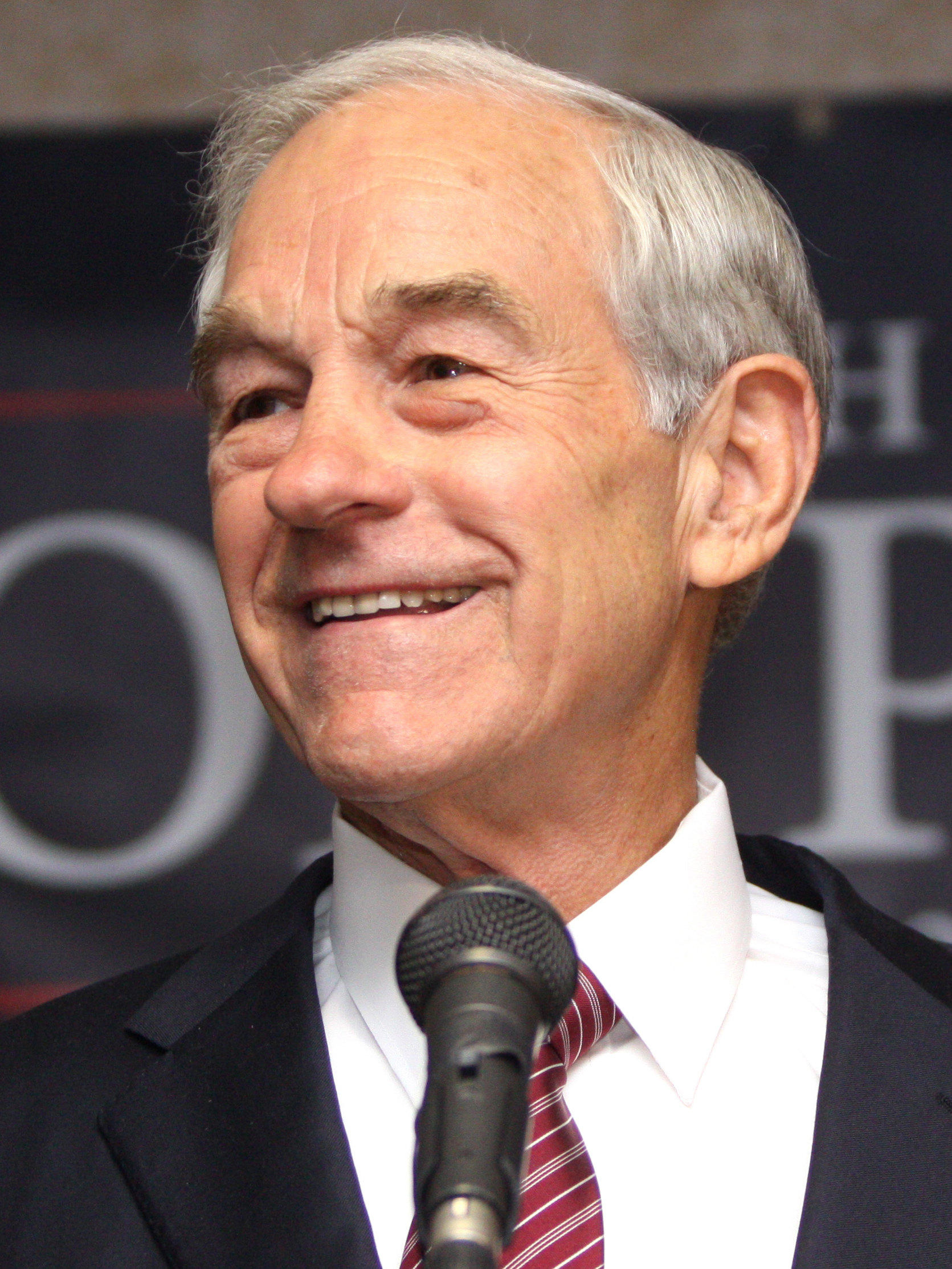

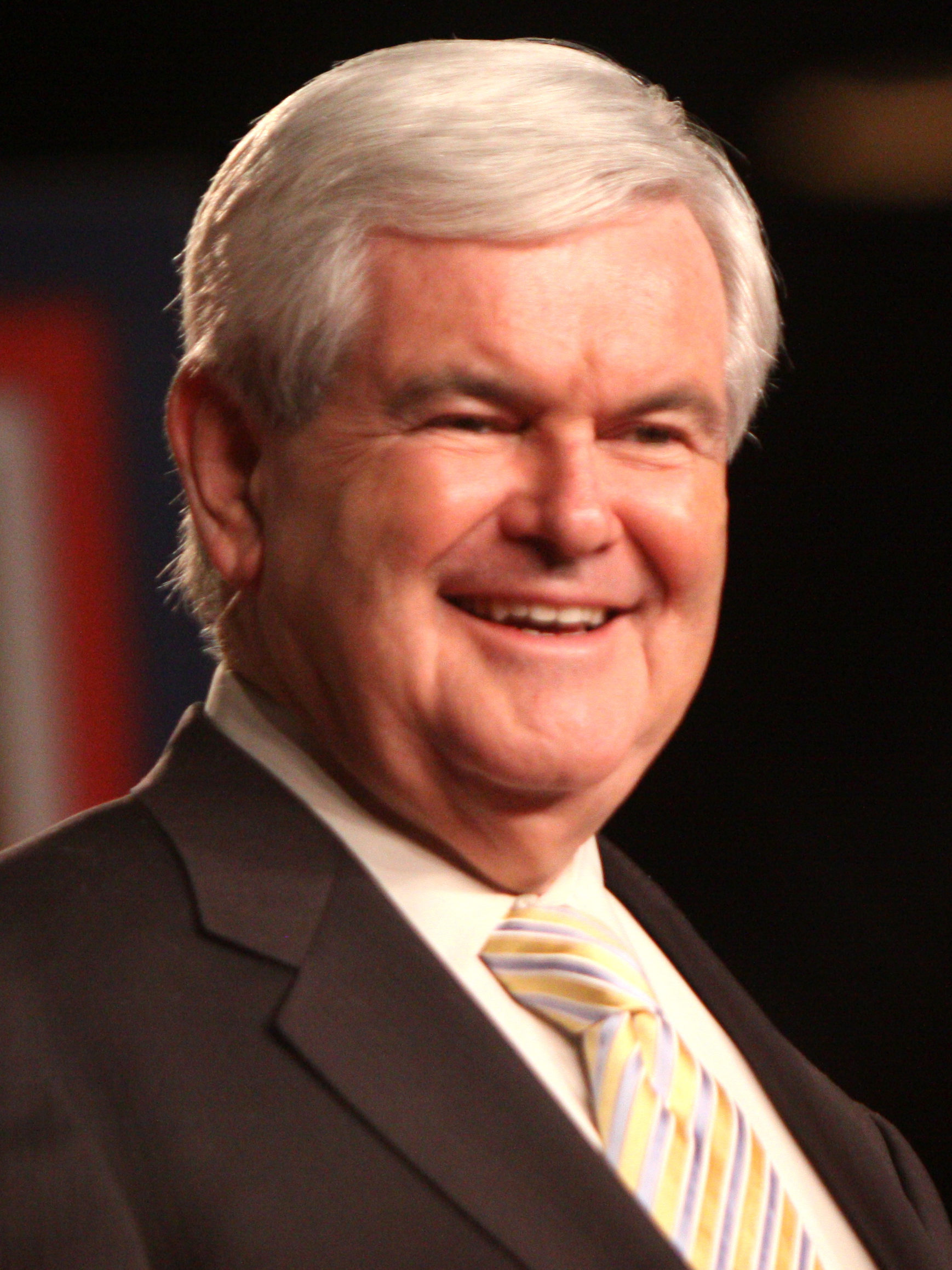
Candidate	Mitt Romney	Rick Santorum
Home state	Massachusetts	Pennsylvania
Delegate count	20	0
Popular vote	65,935	9,517
Percentage	73.17%	10.56%
Candidate	Ron Paul	Newt Gingrich
Home state	Texas	Georgia
Delegate count	0	0
Popular vote	9,363	5,928
Percentage	10.39%	5.88%
- New Mexico results by county Mitt Romney

The 2012 New Mexico Republican presidential primary was proclaimed under state law on January 30, 2012 to take place on June 5, 2012. Under New Mexico law it is a closed primary, with only registered members of the New Mexico Republican Party being eligible to vote in the Republican primary. 20 delegates were chosen, for a total of 23 delegates to go to the national convention.

==== Federal offices ====
- President of the United States: This is a "proportional primary". The twenty delegates to the National Republican Convention are bound proportionally, according to the percentage of votes received, to presidential contenders who receive 15% or more of the primary vote statewide.
- United States Senate: A single candidate to run for the seat formerly held by Jeff Bingaman.
- United States House of Representatives: One candidate from each of the three congressional districts.

==== Statewide offices ====
- Court of Appeals: One candidate to run for the unexpired term of Judge Robert E. Robles, currently held by appointee Judge J. Miles Hanisee.
- Public Regulation Commission: One candidate for each of District 1 and District 3 for four year terms.

==== Results ====
New Mexico Republican primary, 2012
Candidate	Votes	Percentage	Delegates
Mitt Romney	65,935	73.2%	20
Rick Santorum	9,517	10.56%	0
Ron Paul	9,363	10.39%	0
Newt Gingrich	5,298	5.88%	0
Unpledged delegates:			3
Total:	90,113	100.0%	23

Key:	Withdrew prior to contest

== General election ==
=== Predictions ===
Source	Ranking	As of
Huffington Post	Lean D	November 6, 2012
CNN	Lean D	November 6, 2012
New York Times	Lean D	November 6, 2012
Washington Post	Tossup	November 6, 2012
RealClearPolitics	Lean D	November 6, 2012
Sabato's Crystal Ball	Likely D	November 5, 2012
FiveThirtyEight	Solid D	November 6, 2012

=== Candidate ballot access ===
- Barack Obama / Joe Biden, Democratic
- Mitt Romney / Paul Ryan, Republican
- Gary Johnson / James P. Gray, Libertarian
- Jill Stein / Cheri Honkala, Green
- Virgil Goode / Jim Clymer, Constitution
- Rocky Anderson / Luis J. Rodriguez, Justice

=== Results ===
2012 United States presidential election in New Mexico
Party	Candidate	Votes	%	±%
Democratic	Barack Obama (incumbent); Joe Biden (incumbent)	415,335	52.99%	−3.92
Republican	Mitt Romney; Paul Ryan	335,788	42.84%	+1.06
Libertarian	Gary Johnson; Jim Gray	27,788	3.55%	+3.26
Green	Jill Stein; Cheri Honkala	2,691	0.34%	+0.15
Justice	Rocky Anderson; Luis J. Rodriguez	1,177	0.15%	N/A
Constitution	Virgil Goode; Jim Clymer	983	0.13%	−0.06
Total votes		783,756	100.00%	
Democratic win				

==== By county ====
County	Barack Obama Democratic		Mitt Romney Republican		Various candidates Other parties		Margin		Total votes cast
County	#	%	#	%	#	%	#	%	Total votes cast
Bernalillo	150,739	55.63%	106,408	39.27%	13,822	5.10%	44,331	16.36%	270,969
Catron	560	26.38%	1,494	70.37%	69	3.25%	-934	-43.99%	2,123
Chaves	6,604	32.54%	13,088	64.50%	600	2.96%	-6,484	-31.96%	20,292
Cibola	4,961	60.18%	2,998	36.37%	284	3.45%	1,963	23.81%	8,243
Colfax	2,828	49.06%	2,699	46.83%	237	4.11%	129	2.23%	5,764
Curry	4,022	29.52%	9,251	67.90%	352	2.58%	-5,229	-38.38%	13,625
De Baca	287	31.82%	586	64.97%	29	3.21%	-299	-33.15%	902
Doña Ana	37,139	55.91%	27,322	41.13%	1,962	2.96%	9,817	14.78%	66,423
Eddy	6,142	31.88%	12,583	65.30%	544	2.82%	-6,441	-33.42%	19,269
Grant	7,090	54.95%	5,358	41.53%	454	3.52%	1,732	13.42%	12,902
Guadalupe	1,488	69.70%	557	26.09%	90	4.21%	931	43.61%	2,135
Harding	260	43.26%	327	54.41%	14	2.33%	-67	-11.15%	601
Hidalgo	995	51.42%	899	46.46%	41	2.12%	96	4.96%	1,935
Lea	4,080	23.98%	12,548	73.75%	387	2.27%	-8,468	-49.77%	17,015
Lincoln	2,942	31.83%	5,961	64.50%	339	3.67%	-3,019	-32.67%	9,242
Los Alamos	5,191	48.72%	4,796	45.02%	667	6.26%	395	3.70%	10,654
Luna	3,583	47.77%	3,670	48.93%	247	3.30%	-87	-1.16%	7,500
McKinley	15,841	72.24%	5,546	25.29%	542	2.47%	10,295	46.95%	21,929
Mora	1,955	74.88%	595	22.79%	61	2.33%	1,360	52.09%	2,611
Otero	6,829	34.12%	12,451	62.22%	732	3.66%	-5,622	-28.10%	20,012
Quay	1,383	37.31%	2,202	59.40%	122	3.29%	-819	-22.09%	3,707
Rio Arriba	11,465	74.72%	3,397	22.14%	481	3.14%	8,068	52.58%	15,343
Roosevelt	1,727	28.93%	4,043	67.73%	199	3.34%	-2,316	-38.80%	5,969
San Juan	15,855	34.29%	28,849	62.39%	1,533	3.32%	-12,994	-28.10%	46,237
San Miguel	8,850	76.90%	2,303	20.01%	356	3.09%	6,547	56.89%	11,509
Sandoval	27,236	50.36%	24,387	45.10%	2,455	4.54%	2,849	5.26%	54,078
Santa Fe	50,872	73.47%	15,500	22.38%	2,873	4.15%	35,372	51.09%	69,245
Sierra	1,964	38.49%	2,928	57.39%	210	4.12%	-964	-18.90%	5,102
Socorro	4,058	56.42%	2,722	37.84%	413	5.74%	1,336	18.58%	7,193
Taos	11,978	78.09%	2,730	17.80%	631	4.11%	9,248	60.29%	15,339
Torrance	2,428	37.93%	3,529	55.12%	445	6.95%	-1,101	-17.19%	6,402
Union	472	26.83%	1,236	70.27%	51	2.90%	-764	-43.44%	1,759
Valencia	13,511	48.73%	12,825	46.25%	1,392	5.02%	686	2.48%	27,728
Total	415,335	52.99%	335,788	42.84%	32,634	4.16%	79,547	10.15%	783,757

Counties that flipped from Democratic to Republican

- Luna (largest city: Deming)

==== By congressional district ====
Obama won two of three congressional districts.

District	Obama	Romney	Representative
1st	55.25%	39.6%	Michelle Lujan Grisham
2nd	44.9%	51.72%	Steve Pearce
3rd	57.52%	38.67%	Ben Ray Luján

== See also ==
- 2012 Republican Party presidential debates and forums
- 2012 Republican Party presidential primaries
- Results of the 2012 Republican Party presidential primaries
- New Mexico Republican Party
