= 1976 United States presidential election in New Mexico =

- November 2, 1976

Nominee	Gerald Ford	Jimmy Carter
Party	Republican	Democratic
Home state	Michigan	Georgia
Running mate	Bob Dole	Walter Mondale
Electoral vote	4	0
Popular vote	211,419	201,148
Percentage	50.75%	48.28%
County results
Ford
50–60%
60–70%
Carter
40–50%
50–60%
60–70%
President before election
Gerald Ford
Republican
Elected President
Jimmy Carter
Democratic

The 1976 United States presidential election in New Mexico took place on November 2, 1976. All fifty states and The District of Columbia were part of the 1976 United States presidential election. State voters chose four electors to represent them in the Electoral College, who voted for president and vice president.

New Mexico was won by President Gerald Ford by a two-point lead. A very partisan election in New Mexico, only one percent of the electorate voted for third-party candidates. While Ford took the State of New Mexico, and much of the American Southwest and Midwest, Georgia Governor Jimmy Carter won the electoral college with 297 votes, and was elected president.

A reliable bellwether state in presidential elections up to this point, this was the first election since gaining statehood that New Mexico did not back the winning presidential candidate, and the only time New Mexico did not back the national popular-vote winner until 2024. (Note: In 2000 and 2016, New Mexico voted for the candidate who won the popular vote but not the Electoral College.)

This is the last time New Mexico voted for a Republican who lost the presidential election, and the last time a Democrat was elected president without winning New Mexico. The state has voted for the Democratic candidate in every election since 2008 and voted for a Democrat who lost the popular vote in 2024, suggesting that its streak as a bellwether has ended.

As of the 2024 presidential election, this is the last election in which Torrance County and Quay County voted for a Democratic presidential candidate.

== Results ==
1976 United States presidential election in New Mexico
Party	Candidate	Votes	%	±%
Republican	Gerald Ford (incumbent); Bob Dole	211,419	50.75%	−10.30
Democratic	Jimmy Carter; Walter Mondale	201,148	48.28%	+11.72
Socialist Workers	Peter Camejo; Willie Mae Reid	2,462	0.59%	+0.47
Libertarian	Roger MacBride; David Bergland	1,110	0.27%	N/A
Socialist	Frank Zeidler; J. Quinn Brisben	240	0.06%	N/A
Prohibition	Benjamin Bubar Jr.; Earl Dodge	211	0.05%	N/A
Total votes		416,590	100.00%	
Republican win				

=== Results by county ===
County	Gerald Ford Republican		Jimmy Carter Democratic		Various candidates Other parties		Margin		Total votes cast
County	#	%	#	%	#	%	#	%	Total votes cast
Bernalillo	76,614	53.98%	63,949	45.06%	1,363	0.96%	12,665	8.92%	141,926
Catron	602	53.18%	517	45.67%	13	1.15%	85	7.51%	1,132
Chaves	10,631	59.26%	7,139	39.79%	170	0.95%	3,492	19.47%	17,940
Colfax	2,259	45.13%	2,718	54.29%	29	0.58%	-459	-9.16%	5,006
Curry	6,232	54.87%	5,004	44.06%	122	1.07%	1,228	10.81%	11,358
De Baca	556	47.93%	597	51.47%	7	0.60%	-41	-3.54%	1,160
Dona Ana	13,888	53.09%	12,036	46.01%	233	0.90%	1,852	7.08%	26,157
Eddy	7,698	45.59%	9,073	53.73%	115	0.68%	-1,375	-8.14%	16,886
Grant	4,095	43.90%	5,176	55.49%	57	0.61%	-1,081	-11.59%	9,328
Guadalupe	1,047	42.68%	1,379	56.22%	27	1.10%	-332	-13.54%	2,453
Harding	387	57.08%	285	42.04%	6	0.88%	102	15.04%	678
Hidalgo	891	48.56%	938	51.12%	6	0.32%	-47	-2.56%	1,835
Lea	8,773	56.82%	6,533	42.31%	135	0.87%	2,240	14.51%	15,441
Lincoln	2,320	61.64%	1,415	37.59%	29	0.77%	905	24.05%	3,764
Los Alamos	5,383	64.43%	2,890	34.59%	82	0.98%	2,493	29.84%	8,355
Luna	2,966	50.25%	2,872	48.65%	65	1.10%	94	1.60%	5,903
McKinley	4,617	39.83%	6,856	59.14%	120	1.03%	-2,239	-19.31%	11,593
Mora	904	38.29%	1,438	60.91%	19	0.80%	-534	-22.62%	2,361
Otero	5,914	52.10%	5,333	46.98%	105	0.92%	581	5.12%	11,352
Quay	2,059	49.08%	2,095	49.94%	41	0.98%	-36	-0.86%	4,195
Rio Arriba	3,213	30.75%	7,125	68.19%	111	1.06%	-3,912	-37.44%	10,449
Roosevelt	3,269	50.85%	3,111	48.39%	49	0.76%	158	2.46%	6,429
San Juan	10,852	55.13%	8,615	43.77%	216	1.10%	2,237	11.36%	19,683
San Miguel	3,162	37.17%	5,204	61.17%	141	1.66%	-2,042	-24.00%	8,507
Sandoval	4,110	44.34%	5,072	54.72%	87	0.94%	-962	-10.38%	9,269
Santa Fe	11,576	44.53%	14,127	54.34%	294	1.13%	-2,551	-9.81%	25,997
Sierra	1,665	51.04%	1,564	47.95%	33	1.01%	101	3.09%	3,262
Socorro	2,265	45.86%	2,606	52.76%	68	1.38%	-341	-6.90%	4,939
Taos	3,012	40.07%	4,414	58.72%	91	1.21%	-1,402	-18.65%	7,517
Torrance	1,462	48.54%	1,526	50.66%	24	0.80%	-64	-2.12%	3,012
Union	1,146	53.30%	975	45.35%	29	1.35%	171	7.95%	2,150
Valencia	7,851	47.43%	8,566	51.75%	136	0.82%	-715	-4.32%	16,553
Totals	211,419	50.75%	201,148	48.28%	4,023	0.97%	10,271	2.47%	416,590

==== Counties that flipped from Republican to Democratic ====
- Grant
- McKinley
- Guadalupe
- Sandoval
- Colfax
- Eddy
- Mora
- Santa Fe
- Taos
- Socorro
- Valencia
- De Baca
- Hidalgo
- Torrance
- Quay
