= Los Alamos County, New Mexico =

County in New Mexico, United States

- County
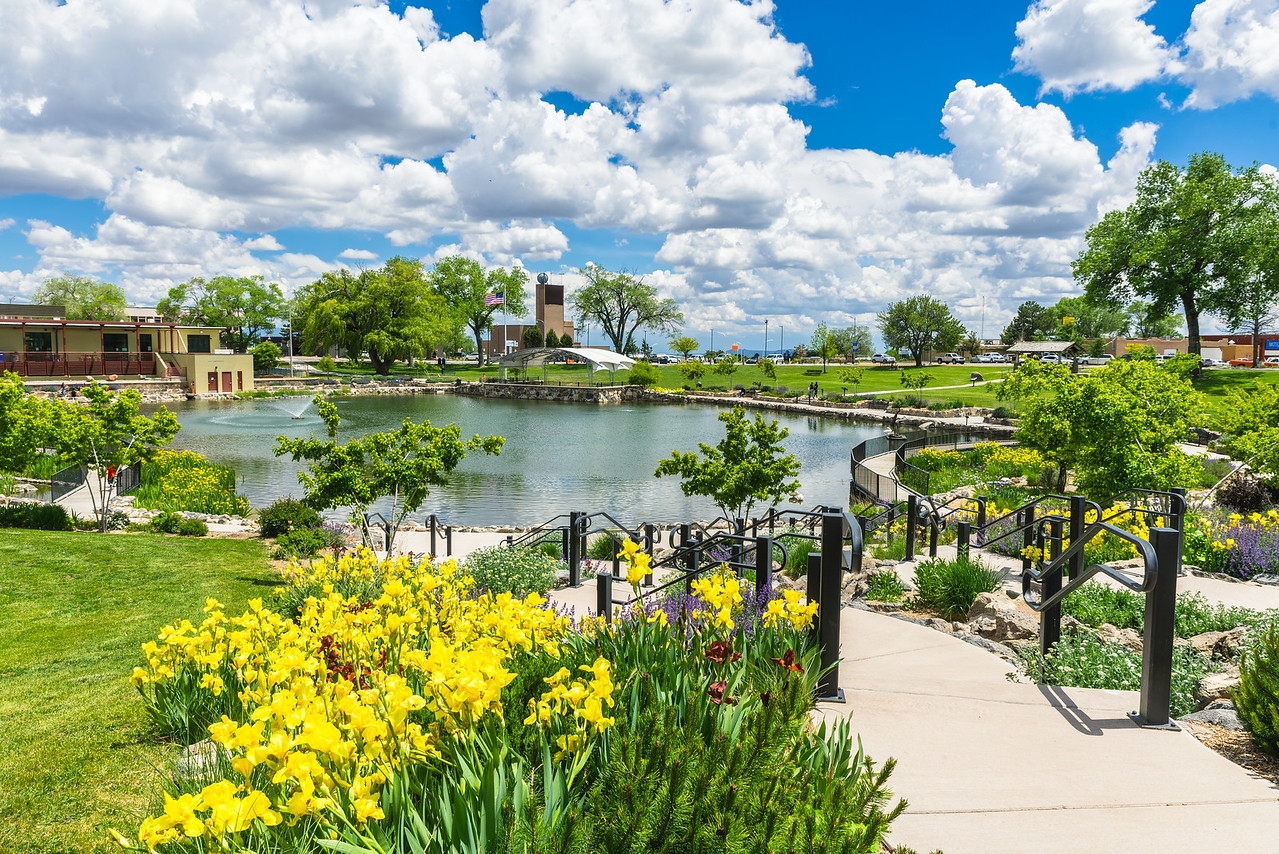
- Ashley Pond Park in Los Alamos, New Mexico

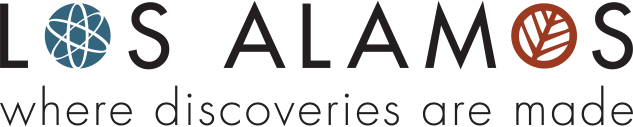
- Flag Seal Logo

- Location within the U.S. state of New Mexico
- Coordinates: 35°52′N 106°19′W
- Country: United States
- State: New Mexico
- Founded: 1949
- Seat: Los Alamos
- Largest community: Los Alamos

Area
  - Land: 109 sq mi (280 km^{2})
  - Water: 0.09 sq mi (0.23 km^{2}) 0.08%

Population (2020)
  - Total: 19,419
  - Estimate (2025): 19,407 ▼
  - Density: 178/sq mi (69/km^{2})
- Time zone: UTC−7 (Mountain)
  - Summer (DST): UTC−6 (MDT)
- Congressional district: 3rd
- Website: www.losalamosnm.gov

Los Alamos County (English: "The Poplars" or "Cottonwoods"; Spanish: Condado de Los Álamos) is a county in the U.S. state of New Mexico. As of the 2020 census, the population was 19,419. The smallest county by area in the state, Los Alamos County was formed from parts of Sandoval and Santa Fe counties on June 10, 1949. The county has two census-designated places: Los Alamos and White Rock.

The land that eventually became Los Alamos County was administered exclusively by the U.S. federal government during and for a few years after the Manhattan Project.

Los Alamos County comprises the Los Alamos Micropolitan Statistical Area, which is also included in the Albuquerque–Santa Fe–Los Alamos combined statistical area.

The county is home to the Los Alamos National Laboratory. Los Alamos County is noted for having the lowest level of child poverty of any county in the United States.

== Geography ==
According to the U.S. Census Bureau, the county has a total area of 109 square miles (280 km^{2}), of which 109 square miles (280 km^{2}) is land and 0.09 square miles (0.23 km^{2}) (0.08%) is water. It is the smallest county by area in New Mexico. There is no significant open water in the county. The county's highest point is located along its northern border, near the summit of Caballo Mountain, at 10,480 feet (3,190 m) above sea level.

=== Adjacent counties ===
- Rio Arriba County – north, northwest, northeast
- Santa Fe County – east
- Sandoval County – south, southwest

=== Pueblos with adjacent territories ===
- Santa Clara Pueblo – northeast
- San Ildefonso Pueblo – east

=== National protected areas ===
- Bandelier National Monument (part)
- Santa Fe National Forest (part)

== Demographics ==
Historical population
Census	Pop.	Note	%±
1950	10,476		—
1960	13,037		24.4%
1970	15,198		16.6%
1980	17,599		15.8%
1990	18,115		2.9%
2000	18,343		1.3%
2010	17,950		−2.1%
2020	19,419		8.2%
2025 (est.)	19,407	▼	−0.1%
U.S. Decennial Census; 1790–1960 1900–1990; 1990–2000 2010

=== 2020 census ===
As of the 2020 census, the county had a population of 19,419. The median age was 41.5 years. 22.5% of residents were under the age of 18 and 18.1% of residents were 65 years of age or older. For every 100 females there were 102.3 males, and for every 100 females age 18 and over there were 101.7 males age 18 and over.

Los Alamos County, New Mexico – Racial and ethnic composition Note: the US Census treats Hispanic/Latino as an ethnic category. This table excludes Latinos from the racial categories and assigns them to a separate category. Hispanics/Latinos may be of any race.
Race / Ethnicity (NH = Non-Hispanic)	Pop 2000	Pop 2010	Pop 2020	% 2000	% 2010	% 2020
White alone (NH)	15,051	13,689	13,446	82.05%	76.26%	69.24%
Black or African American alone (NH)	63	97	157	0.34%	0.54%	0.81%
Native American or Alaska Native alone (NH)	90	111	116	0.49%	0.62%	0.60%
Asian alone (NH)	690	1,060	1,223	3.76%	5.91%	6.30%
Pacific Islander alone (NH)	6	8	15	0.03%	0.04%	0.08%
Other race alone (NH)	25	31	138	0.14%	0.17%	0.71%
Mixed race or Multiracial (NH)	263	308	889	1.43%	1.72%	4.58%
Hispanic or Latino (any race)	2,155	2,646	3,435	11.75%	14.74%	17.69%
Total	18,343	17,950	19,419	100.00%	100.00%	100.00%

The racial makeup of the county was 74.7% White, 0.9% Black or African American, 0.8% American Indian and Alaska Native, 6.4% Asian, 0.1% Native Hawaiian and Pacific Islander, 3.8% from some other race, and 13.4% from two or more races. Hispanic or Latino residents of any race comprised 17.7% of the population.

95.0% of residents lived in urban areas, while 5.0% lived in rural areas.

There were 8,147 households in the county, of which 30.2% had children under the age of 18 living with them and 20.2% had a female householder with no spouse or partner present. About 29.3% of all households were made up of individuals and 10.9% had someone living alone who was 65 years of age or older.

There were 8,634 housing units, of which 5.6% were vacant. Among occupied housing units, 74.7% were owner-occupied and 25.3% were renter-occupied. The homeowner vacancy rate was 0.9% and the rental vacancy rate was 5.0%.

=== 2010 census ===
As of the 2010 census, there were 17,950 people, 7,663 households, and 5,199 families living in the county. The population density was 164.4 inhabitants per square mile (63.5/km^{2}). There were 8,354 housing units at an average density of 76.5 units per square mile (29.5 units/km^{2}). The racial makeup of the county was 87.8% white, 6.0% Asian, 0.8% American Indian, 0.6% black or African American, 0.1% Pacific islander, 2.2% from other races, and 2.6% from two or more races. Those of Hispanic or Latino origin made up 14.7% of the population. In terms of ancestry, 18.9% were of German origin, 16.5% English, 13.2% Irish, and 6.5% were American.

Of the 7,663 households, 31.3% had children under the age of 18 living with them, 58.1% were married couples living together, 6.4% had a female householder with no husband present, 32.2% were non-families, and 28.5% of all households were made up of individuals. The average household size was 2.33 and the average family size was 2.86. The median age was 44.3 years.

The median income for a household in the county was $103,643 and the median income for a family was $118,993. Males had a median income of $93,040 versus $51,753 for females. The per capita income for the county was $49,474. About 1.4% of families and 2.4% of the population were below the poverty line, including 1.8% of those under age 18 and 2.4% of those age 65 or over.

=== 2000 census ===
As of the 2000 census, there were 18,343 people, 7,497 households, and 5,337 families living in the county. The population density was 168 people per square mile (65 people/km^{2}). There were 7,937 housing units at an average density of 73 units per square mile (28/km^{2}). The racial makeup of the county was 90.3% White, 0.4% Black or African American, 0.6% Native American, 3.8% Asian, <0.1% Pacific Islander, 2.7% from other races, and 2.3% from two or more races. 11.8% of the population were Hispanic or Latino of any race.

There were 7,497 households, out of which 33.5% had children under the age of 18 living with them, 62.7% were married couples living together, 5.7% had a female householder with no husband present, and 28.8% were non-families. 24.9% of all households were made up of individuals, and 6.7% had someone living alone who was 65 years of age or older. The average household size was 2.43 and the average family size was 2.92.

In the county, 25.8% of the population was under the age of 18, 4.4% was from 18 to 24, 27.7% from 25 to 44, 30.0% from 45 to 64, and 12.1% was 65 years of age or older. The median age was 41 years. For every 100 females there were 101.40 males. For every 100 females age 18 and over, there were 99.70 males.

The median income for a household in the county was $78,993, and the median income for a family was $90,032. Males had a median income of $70,063 versus $40,246 for females. The per capita income for the county was $34,646. 2.9% of the population and 1.9% of families were below the poverty line. 1.8% of those under the age of 18 and 4.7% of those 65 and older were living below the poverty line.

== Government ==
=== County council ===
The county council was created by the Los Alamos County Charter. The council consists of seven members elected at large for four-year, staggered terms. Each year the seven councilors select the new chair and vice chair.

Position	Name	Party reg.
County Councilor, Chair	Theresa Cull	Democrat
County Councilor, Vice Chair	Suzie Havemann	Democrat
County Councilor, At-large	Randall Ryti	Democrat
County Councilor, At–large	David Reagor	Republican
County Councilor, At–large	Melanee Hand	Democrat
County Councilor, At–large	Ryn Herrmann	Democrat
County Councilor, At–large	Beverly Neal-Clinton	Democrat

=== County offices ===
Name	Position	Party reg.
County Assessor	George Chandler	Democrat
County Clerk	Michael Redondo	Democrat
Municipal Judge	Elizabeth K. Allen	Democrat
Probate Judge	Perry Klare	Democrat
Sheriff	Jason Wardlow Herrera	Democrat

== Quality of life ==
In a study conducted by American City Business Journals in 2004, Los Alamos County topped the list as the best place to live in the United States in terms of quality of life. This was attributed to the high levels of job stability, income and education of Los Alamos residents, many of whom are employed as scientists and engineers at the Los Alamos National Laboratory. The county has one of the highest number of PhDs per capita and the 2011 median household income of $110,204 per year is the second highest among all the counties in the U.S. In per capita income, Los Alamos County ranks 1st in New Mexico and 7th in the United States, and has the second-lowest level of poverty in the United States, and the lowest level of child poverty. Other factors contributing to Los Alamos's high quality-of-life index were the access to affordable housing and short commuting times.

In 2021, Los Alamos County was judged by the U.S. News & World Report to be the healthiest of 3,143 counties and county-equivalents of the United States based on 84 different factors. Residents of the county lived 83.4 years on the average compared to the U.S. average of 77.5 years.

== Communities ==
- Los Alamos (county seat)
- White Rock

== Education ==
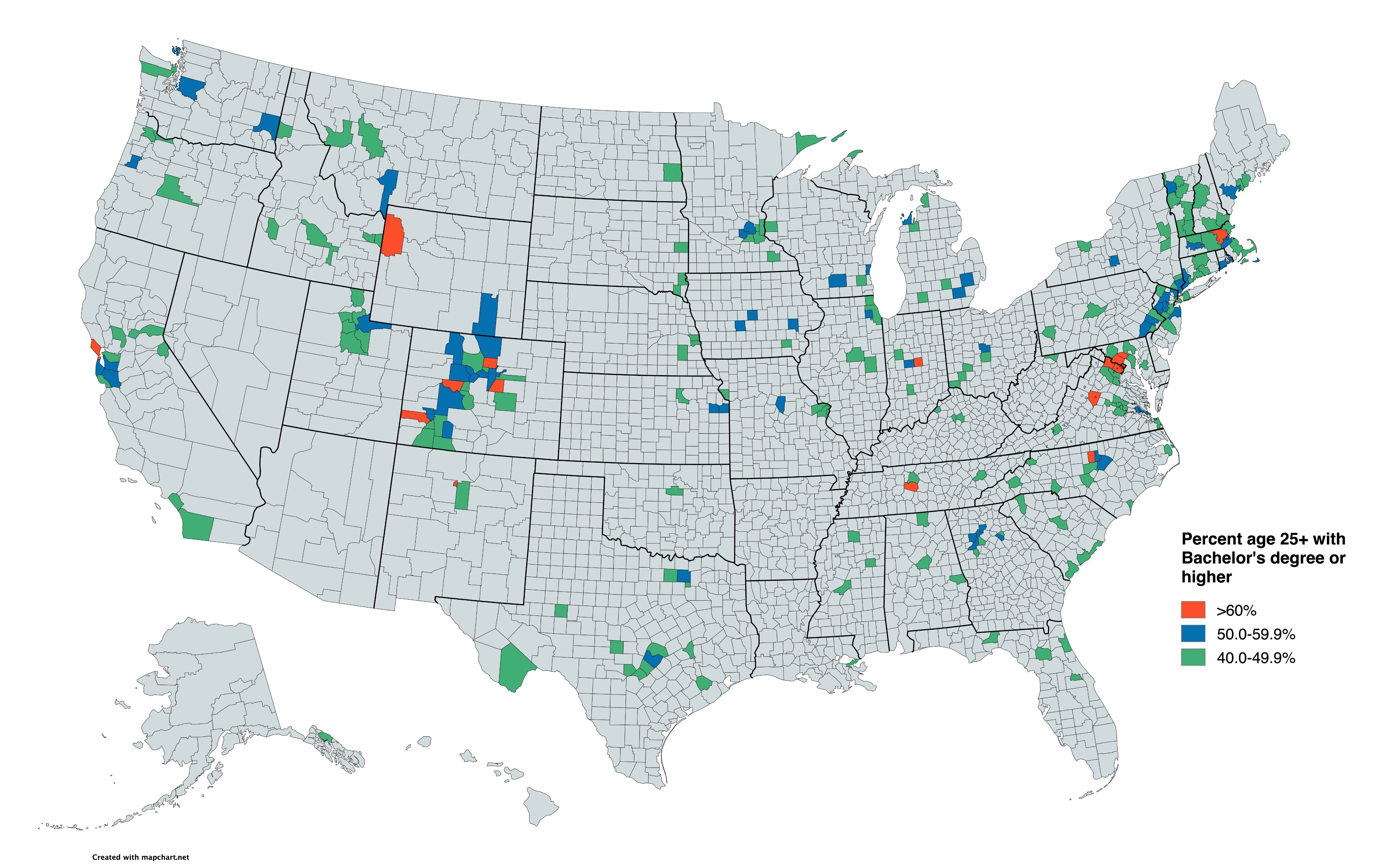
A map of the most college-educated counties in the United States

Los Alamos County is one of the most highly educated counties in the United States. More than 60% of adult residents over the age of 25 have bachelor's degrees, over 40% have a graduate degree, and nearly 20% have a PhD. To put this in perspective, the county is more highly educated than the District of Columbia, the nation's capital.

All of the county is in the boundary of Los Alamos Public Schools. Los Alamos High School is the comprehensive high school.

== Energy ==
=== Current energy resources ===
Starting in 1985, Los Alamos County, including both the White Rock and Los Alamos communities, has shared energy resources with the Los Alamos National Laboratory.

Resource Breakdown
Resource	Type	Amount (MW)
Power Purchase Agreement	Mixed	45
LANL Combustion Turbine	Gas	25
Abiquiu Hydroelectric	Hydro	17
Laramie River Station	Coal	10
Western Area Power Adm.	Hydro	10
El Vado Hydroelectric	Hydro	9
East Jemez Photovoltaic	Solar	1
Purchased Power Contracts	Variable	—N/a
Transmission Arrangements	Variable	—N/a

=== Future energy resources ===
Both Los Alamos County and the Los Alamos National Laboratory are trying to reduce their respective carbon emissions in order to help mitigate the continually worsening dangers of climate change. In 2015, Los Alamos County joined with the Utah Associated Municipal Power Systems in the Carbon Free Power Project. The Project planned to use NuScale Power's Small Module Reactor design to provide nuclear energy to counties across the United States, but was cancelled in 2023 because of cost increases. Los Alamos' history is tied to nuclear energy, which has an environmental impact comparable to that of renewables as a source of domestic power. This is true of both large and small module reactors.

== Politics ==
Formerly solidly Republican, Los Alamos County has voted Democratic since 2008. In 2024, Democratic nominee Kamala Harris won the highest percentage of the vote in the county since 1964.

It has seen high percentages of third-party votes in years with major third-party candidates, such as with John B. Anderson in 1980, Ross Perot in 1992 and 1996, and Gary Johnson in 2012 and 2016. Los Alamos County had the highest percentage of support for Johnson in New Mexico in 2016, at 13.89% (a total of 1,512 votes out of 10,885 cast).

United States presidential election results for Los Alamos County, New Mexico
Year	Republican		Democratic		Third party(ies)	
Year	No.	%	No.	%	No.	%
1952	2,226	49.30%	2,281	50.52%	8	0.18%
1956	2,406	51.98%	2,214	47.83%	9	0.19%
1960	2,574	48.72%	2,692	50.96%	17	0.32%
1964	1,895	33.32%	3,767	66.23%	26	0.46%
1968	3,447	54.92%	2,552	40.66%	277	4.41%
1972	5,039	66.09%	2,435	31.94%	150	1.97%
1976	5,383	64.43%	2,890	34.59%	82	0.98%
1980	5,460	58.19%	2,368	25.24%	1,555	16.57%
1984	6,882	69.60%	2,859	28.91%	147	1.49%
1988	6,622	65.22%	3,275	32.26%	256	2.52%
1992	4,320	40.59%	3,897	36.62%	2,425	22.79%
1996	4,999	50.33%	3,983	40.10%	950	9.57%
2000	5,623	55.03%	4,149	40.60%	446	4.36%
2004	5,810	51.89%	5,206	46.49%	181	1.62%
2008	5,064	45.75%	5,824	52.62%	181	1.64%
2012	4,796	45.02%	5,191	48.72%	667	6.26%
2016	3,359	30.86%	5,562	51.10%	1,964	18.04%
2020	4,278	34.80%	7,554	61.45%	461	3.75%
2024	4,047	33.21%	7,726	63.40%	414	3.40%

Los Alamos County is one of nine counties that shifted more than 25 percentage points to the left from 2012 to 2024.

== Transportation ==
- NM 4
- NM 501
- NM 502

== See also ==
- National Register of Historic Places listings in Los Alamos County, New Mexico
- Mesa Public Library
