= 1996 United States presidential election in New Mexico =

- November 5, 1996

Nominee	Bill Clinton	Bob Dole	Ross Perot
Party	Democratic	Republican	Reform
Home state	Arkansas	Kansas	Texas
Running mate	Al Gore	Jack Kemp	Pat Choate
Electoral vote	5	0	0
Popular vote	273,495	232,751	32,257
Percentage	49.18%	41.86%	5.80%

Clinton
40–50%
50–60%
60–70%
70–80%
80–90%
Dole
30–40%
40–50%
50–60%
60–70%
70–80%
80–90%
No data
President before election
Bill Clinton
Democratic
Elected President
Bill Clinton
Democratic

The 1996 United States presidential election in New Mexico took place on November 5, 1996. All fifty states and the District of Columbia, were part of the 1996 United States presidential election. State voters chose five electors to the Electoral College, which selected the president and vice president.

New Mexico was won by incumbent United States President Bill Clinton of Arkansas, who was running against Kansas Senator Bob Dole. Clinton ran a second time with former Tennessee Senator Al Gore as Vice President, and Dole ran with former New York Congressman Jack Kemp.

New Mexico weighed in for this election as 1% more Republican than the national average. The presidential election of 1996 was a very multi-partisan election for New Mexico, with nearly ten percent of the electorate voting for third-party candidates, and two third-party candidates receiving more than 1% of the vote. The majority of counties in New Mexico turned out for Clinton, including the highly populated areas of Doña Ana County, Santa Fe County and Albuquerque’s Bernalillo County. In his second bid for the presidency, Ross Perot led the newly reformed Reform Party to gain over five percent of the votes in New Mexico, and to pull in support nationally as the most popular third-party candidate to run for United States Presidency in recent times.

As of the 2024 presidential election, this is the last election in which the following counties voted for a Democratic presidential candidate: Sierra, Eddy, and De Baca.

== Results ==
1996 United States presidential election in New Mexico
Party	Candidate	Votes	%	±%
Democratic	Bill Clinton (incumbent); Al Gore (incumbent)	273,495	49.18%	+3.28
Republican	Bob Dole; Jack Kemp	232,751	41.86%	+4.52
Reform	Ross Perot; Pat Choate	32,257	5.80%	−10.32
Green	Ralph Nader; Winona LaDuke	13,218	2.38%	N/A
Libertarian	Harry Browne; Jo Jorgensen	2,996	0.54%	+0.26
U.S. Taxpayers'	Howard Phillips; Herbert Titus	713	0.13%	+0.02
Natural Law	John Hagelin; Mike Tompkins	644	0.12%	+0.02
Total votes		556,074	100.00%	
Democratic win				

=== Results by county ===
County	Bill Clinton Democratic		Bob Dole Republican		Ross Perot Reform		Ralph Nader Green		Various candidates Other parties		Margin		Total votes cast
County	#	%	#	%	#	%	#	%	#	%	#	%	Total votes cast
Bernalillo	88,140	48.28%	78,832	43.19%	8,708	4.77%	5,269	2.89%	1,594	0.87%	9,308	5.09%	182,543
Catron	423	27.76%	923	60.56%	114	7.48%	29	1.90%	35	2.30%	-500	-32.80%	1,524
Chaves	7,014	37.87%	9,991	53.95%	1,271	6.86%	123	0.66%	120	0.65%	-2,977	-16.08%	18,519
Cibola	4,030	58.58%	2,245	32.63%	488	7.09%	85	1.24%	32	0.47%	1,785	25.95%	6,880
Colfax	2,659	51.47%	1,975	38.23%	411	7.96%	90	1.74%	31	0.60%	684	13.24%	5,166
Curry	4,116	33.07%	7,378	59.28%	842	6.76%	61	0.49%	50	0.40%	-3,262	-26.21%	12,447
De Baca	509	46.57%	489	44.74%	86	7.87%	4	0.37%	5	0.46%	20	1.83%	1,093
Doña Ana	22,766	52.26%	17,541	40.26%	2,269	5.21%	635	1.46%	353	0.81%	5,225	12.00%	43,564
Eddy	8,959	47.16%	8,534	44.92%	1,297	6.83%	101	0.53%	107	0.56%	425	2.24%	18,998
Grant	5,860	53.62%	3,993	36.54%	778	7.12%	205	1.88%	92	0.84%	1,867	17.08%	10,928
Guadalupe	1,208	69.59%	436	25.12%	79	4.55%	9	0.52%	4	0.23%	772	44.47%	1,736
Harding	264	42.86%	321	52.11%	28	4.55%	3	0.49%	0	0.00%	-57	-9.25%	616
Hidalgo	943	48.31%	789	40.42%	209	10.71%	5	0.26%	6	0.31%	154	7.89%	1,952
Lea	5,393	36.77%	7,661	52.24%	1,465	9.99%	54	0.37%	93	0.63%	-2,268	-15.47%	14,666
Lincoln	2,209	34.46%	3,396	52.97%	666	10.39%	78	1.22%	62	0.97%	-1,187	-18.51%	6,411
Los Alamos	3,983	40.10%	4,999	50.33%	560	5.64%	247	2.49%	143	1.44%	-1,016	-10.23%	9,932
Luna	3,001	47.44%	2,616	41.35%	598	9.45%	63	1.00%	48	0.76%	385	6.09%	6,326
McKinley	10,124	65.21%	4,470	28.79%	650	4.19%	196	1.26%	86	0.55%	5,654	36.42%	15,526
Mora	1,646	68.76%	561	23.43%	131	5.47%	39	1.63%	17	0.71%	1,085	45.33%	2,394
Otero	5,938	36.35%	9,065	55.49%	1,096	6.71%	131	0.80%	107	0.65%	-3,127	-19.14%	16,337
Quay	1,830	43.82%	1,943	46.53%	377	9.03%	14	0.34%	12	0.29%	-113	-2.71%	4,176
Rio Arriba	7,965	70.46%	2,551	22.57%	469	4.15%	268	2.37%	52	0.46%	5,414	47.89%	11,305
Roosevelt	2,097	35.73%	3,245	55.29%	467	7.96%	28	0.48%	32	0.55%	-1,148	-19.56%	5,869
San Juan	12,070	37.08%	17,478	53.69%	2,355	7.23%	399	1.23%	251	0.77%	-5,408	-16.61%	32,553
San Miguel	6,995	72.51%	1,938	20.09%	405	4.20%	250	2.59%	59	0.61%	5,057	52.42%	9,647
Sandoval	13,081	49.46%	11,015	41.65%	1,482	5.60%	618	2.34%	252	0.95%	2,066	7.81%	26,448
Santa Fe	26,349	62.08%	10,857	25.58%	1,846	4.35%	3,018	7.11%	376	0.89%	15,492	36.50%	42,446
Sierra	2,154	44.83%	2,140	44.54%	431	8.97%	50	1.04%	30	0.62%	14	0.29%	4,805
Socorro	3,374	53.02%	2,315	36.38%	455	7.15%	135	2.12%	85	1.34%	1,059	16.64%	6,364
Taos	6,635	66.00%	2,126	21.15%	545	5.42%	660	6.57%	87	0.87%	4,509	44.85%	10,053
Torrance	2,072	44.51%	2,154	46.27%	332	7.13%	64	1.37%	33	0.71%	-82	-1.76%	4,655
Union	519	31.45%	995	60.30%	125	7.58%	5	0.30%	6	0.36%	-476	-28.85%	1,650
Valencia	9,169	49.44%	7,779	41.95%	1,222	6.59%	282	1.52%	93	0.50%	1,390	7.49%	18,545
Totals	273,495	49.18%	232,751	41.86%	32,257	5.80%	13,218	2.38%	4,353	0.78%	40,744	7.32%	556,074

==== Counties that flipped from Republican to Democratic ====
- De Baca

== See also ==
- Presidency of Bill Clinton
