= Jacqueline Wonsetler =

American meteorologist (1918–1974)

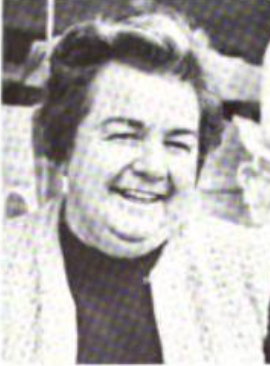
- Jacqueline Wonsetler, from a 1972 publication of the NOAA
- Born: 13 June 1918; Chaves County, New Mexico
- Died: 1 December 1974 (aged 56); Marion, Oregon
- Occupation: Meteorologist

Florence Jacqueline Wonsetler (13 June 1918 – 1 December 1974) was an American meteorologist. She worked for the National Weather Service for 29 years.

== Early life and education ==
Wonsetler was born in Chaves County, New Mexico, the daughter of Joe Bussey Wonsetler and Florence M. Dean Wonsetler. Her father taught at the New Mexico Military Institute in Roswell. She moved to California with her parents as a child, and earned a bachelor's degree in history at the University of California, Los Angeles (UCLA) in 1940, and earned a master's degree from the University of Oregon. She later studied meteorology through correspondence courses from the Pennsylvania State University, She earned a pilot's license in 1946.

== Career ==
Wonsetler joined the United States Navy WAVES during World War II, working as an aerographer's mate from 1943 to 1945. After the war, she joined the National Weather Service, and held meteorological posts are several locations, most notably at McNary Field in Salem, Oregon and in Flagstaff, Arizona, where she was working when she retired in 1972, after 29 years of service. She received the Department of Commerce Outstanding Accomplishment Award "for work in the development of service and briefing methods for transcontinental air races."

Wonsetler was an active member of the Los Angeles chapter of the Ninety-nines, and Citizens for a Better Flagstaff, and served on an advisory commission for the Flagstaff municipal airport. She and her mother owned a mine in Maricopa County, Arizona.

== Personal life ==
Wonsetler died in 1974, aged 56 years, in Marion, Oregon. Her grave is in Willamette National Cemetery in Oregon.
