= 1992 United States presidential election in New Mexico =

- November 3, 1992

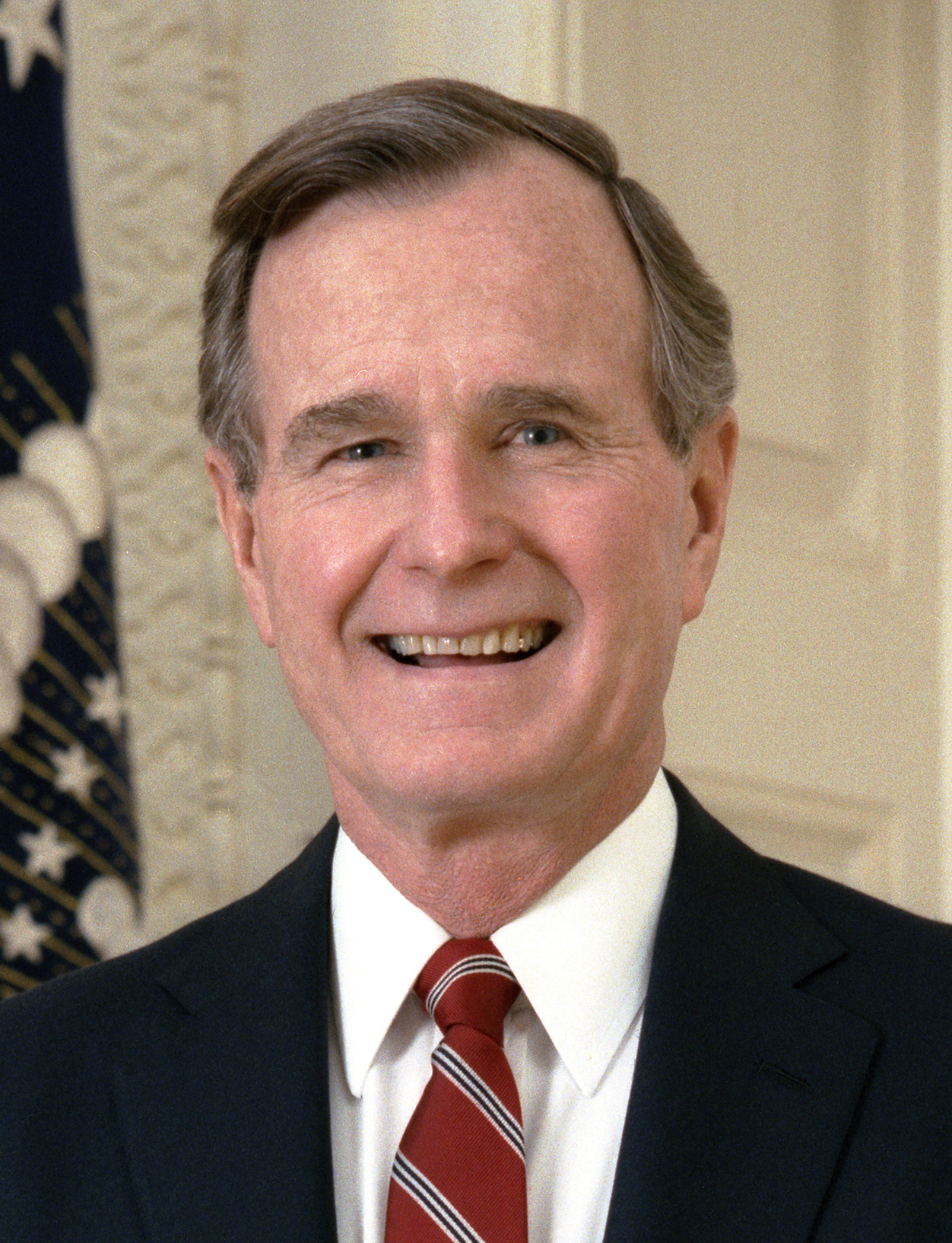

| Nominee | Bill Clinton | George H. W. Bush | Ross Perot |
| Party | Democratic | Republican | Independent |
| Home state | Arkansas | Texas | Texas |
| Running mate | Al Gore | Dan Quayle | James Stockdale |
| Electoral vote | 5 | 0 | 0 |
| Popular vote | 261,617 | 212,824 | 91,895 |
| Percentage | 45.90% | 37.34% | 16.12% |

Clinton
30-40%
40–50%
50–60%
60–70%
70–80%
80–90%
Bush
30–40%
40–50%
50–60%
60–70%
70–80%
80–90%
90–100%
No data
President before election
George H. W. Bush
Republican
Elected President
Bill Clinton
Democratic

The 1992 United States presidential election in New Mexico took place on November 3, 1992, as part of the 1992 United States presidential election. State voters chose five electors to the Electoral College, who voted for president and vice president.

New Mexico was won by Governor Bill Clinton (D-Arkansas) with 45.90 percent of the popular vote over incumbent President George H.W. Bush (R-Texas) with 37.34 percent. Businessman Ross Perot (I-Texas) finished third, with 16.12 percent of the popular vote. Clinton ultimately won the national vote, defeating incumbent President Bush.

As a result of his win, Clinton became the first Democratic presidential candidate since Lyndon B. Johnson in 1964 to win the state. However, this election marked a major shift in the state's politics, and New Mexico would vote Democratic for every election after this, except in 2004, when Bush's son George W. Bush very narrowly won the state over John Kerry.

This was the 20th U.S. presidential election that New Mexico participated in since 1912.

== Results ==
1992 United States presidential election in New Mexico
| Party | Candidate | Votes | % | ±% |
|---|---|---|---|---|
| Democratic | Bill Clinton; Al Gore | 261,617 | 45.90% | −1.00 |
| Republican | George H. W. Bush (incumbent); Dan Quayle (incumbent) | 212,824 | 37.34% | −14.52 |
| Independent | Ross Perot; James Stockdale | 91,895 | 16.12% | N/A |
| Libertarian | Andre Marrou; Nancy Lord | 1,615 | 0.28% | −0.35 |
| U.S. Taxpayers' | Howard Phillips; Albion W. Knight Jr. | 620 | 0.11% | N/A |
| Natural Law | John Hagelin; Mike Tompkins | 562 | 0.10% | N/A |
| New Alliance | Lenora Fulani; Maria Elizabeth Muñoz | 369 | 0.06% | −0.37 |
| Socialist Workers | James Warren; Willie Mae Reid | 183 | 0.03% | −0.04 |
| Workers World | Gloria La Riva; Larry Holmes | 181 | 0.03% | −0.02 |
| Prohibition | Earl Dodge; George Ormsby | 120 | 0.02% | −0.03 |
| Total votes | | 569,986 | 100.00% | |
| Democratic win | | | | |

=== Results by county ===
| County | Bill Clinton Democratic | | George H. W. Bush Republican | | Ross Perot Independent | | Various candidates Other parties | | Margin | | Total votes cast |
| County | # | % | # | % | # | % | # | % | # | % | Total votes cast |
|---|---|---|---|---|---|---|---|---|---|---|---|
| Bernalillo | 90,863 | 45.27% | 77,304 | 38.52% | 31,241 | 15.57% | 1,290 | 0.64% | 13,559 | 6.75% | 200,698 |
| Catron | 465 | 29.94% | 771 | 49.65% | 289 | 18.61% | 28 | 1.80% | -306 | -19.71% | 1,553 |
| Chaves | 6,360 | 33.65% | 8,872 | 46.95% | 3,590 | 19.00% | 76 | 0.40% | -2,512 | -13.30% | 18,898 |
| Cibola | 3,334 | 53.06% | 2,051 | 32.64% | 847 | 13.48% | 52 | 0.83% | 1,283 | 20.42% | 6,284 |
| Colfax | 2,607 | 49.87% | 1,730 | 33.09% | 871 | 16.66% | 20 | 0.38% | 877 | 16.78% | 5,228 |
| Curry | 3,699 | 29.28% | 6,831 | 54.07% | 2,056 | 16.27% | 47 | 0.37% | -3,132 | -24.79% | 12,633 |
| De Baca | 451 | 38.06% | 526 | 44.39% | 204 | 17.22% | 4 | 0.34% | -75 | -6.33% | 1,185 |
| Doña Ana | 19,894 | 44.99% | 16,308 | 36.88% | 7,682 | 17.37% | 333 | 0.75% | 3,586 | 8.11% | 44,217 |
| Eddy | 7,409 | 40.70% | 7,313 | 40.18% | 3,430 | 18.84% | 50 | 0.27% | 96 | 0.52% | 18,202 |
| Grant | 5,603 | 54.52% | 2,917 | 28.38% | 1,685 | 16.40% | 72 | 0.70% | 2,686 | 26.14% | 10,277 |
| Guadalupe | 1,225 | 58.28% | 691 | 32.87% | 173 | 8.23% | 13 | 0.62% | 534 | 25.41% | 2,102 |
| Harding | 268 | 39.53% | 312 | 46.02% | 98 | 14.45% | 0 | 0.00% | -44 | -6.49% | 678 |
| Hidalgo | 995 | 42.98% | 871 | 37.62% | 442 | 19.09% | 7 | 0.30% | 124 | 5.36% | 2,315 |
| Lea | 5,047 | 30.94% | 7,921 | 48.56% | 3,233 | 19.82% | 110 | 0.67% | -2,874 | -17.62% | 16,311 |
| Lincoln | 1,730 | 29.54% | 2,669 | 45.57% | 1,431 | 24.43% | 27 | 0.46% | -939 | -16.03% | 5,857 |
| Los Alamos | 3,897 | 36.62% | 4,320 | 40.59% | 2,339 | 21.98% | 86 | 0.81% | -423 | -3.97% | 10,642 |
| Luna | 2,637 | 42.04% | 2,166 | 34.53% | 1,445 | 23.04% | 24 | 0.38% | 471 | 7.51% | 6,272 |
| McKinley | 9,405 | 60.56% | 4,720 | 30.39% | 1,304 | 8.40% | 102 | 0.66% | 4,685 | 30.17% | 15,531 |
| Mora | 1,555 | 64.23% | 668 | 27.59% | 188 | 7.77% | 10 | 0.41% | 887 | 36.64% | 2,421 |
| Otero | 5,377 | 33.19% | 7,481 | 46.17% | 3,257 | 20.10% | 88 | 0.54% | -2,104 | -12.98% | 16,203 |
| Quay | 1,758 | 40.99% | 1,759 | 41.01% | 755 | 17.60% | 17 | 0.40% | -1 | -0.02% | 4,289 |
| Rio Arriba | 7,832 | 67.86% | 2,680 | 23.22% | 984 | 8.53% | 46 | 0.40% | 5,152 | 44.64% | 11,542 |
| Roosevelt | 2,172 | 33.35% | 3,215 | 49.36% | 1,085 | 16.66% | 41 | 0.63% | -1,043 | -16.01% | 6,513 |
| San Juan | 11,302 | 37.32% | 13,415 | 44.30% | 5,351 | 17.67% | 213 | 0.70% | -2,113 | -6.98% | 30,281 |
| San Miguel | 6,186 | 65.90% | 2,183 | 23.26% | 965 | 10.28% | 53 | 0.56% | 4,003 | 42.64% | 9,387 |
| Sandoval | 10,951 | 46.45% | 8,491 | 36.02% | 3,954 | 16.77% | 178 | 0.76% | 2,460 | 10.43% | 23,574 |
| Santa Fe | 27,189 | 63.35% | 9,684 | 22.56% | 5,656 | 13.18% | 388 | 0.90% | 17,505 | 40.79% | 42,917 |
| Sierra | 1,771 | 40.09% | 1,562 | 35.36% | 1,055 | 23.88% | 30 | 0.68% | 209 | 4.73% | 4,418 |
| Socorro | 2,908 | 47.77% | 2,186 | 35.91% | 918 | 15.08% | 76 | 1.25% | 722 | 11.86% | 6,088 |
| Taos | 7,051 | 66.01% | 2,260 | 21.16% | 1,300 | 12.17% | 70 | 0.66% | 4,791 | 44.85% | 10,681 |
| Torrance | 1,662 | 39.88% | 1,667 | 40.00% | 810 | 19.44% | 28 | 0.67% | -5 | -0.12% | 4,167 |
| Union | 519 | 27.99% | 975 | 52.59% | 355 | 19.15% | 5 | 0.27% | -456 | -24.60% | 1,854 |
| Valencia | 7,495 | 44.70% | 6,305 | 37.60% | 2,902 | 17.31% | 66 | 0.39% | 1,190 | 7.10% | 16,768 |
| Totals | 261,617 | 45.90% | 212,824 | 37.34% | 91,895 | 16.12% | 3,650 | 0.64% | 48,793 | 8.56% | 569,986 |

==== Counties that flipped from Republican to Democratic ====
- Bernalillo
- Doña Ana
- Eddy
- Hidalgo
- Luna
- Sandoval
- Sierra
- Socorro
- Valencia
