= 2024 United States presidential election in New Mexico =

- November 5, 2024
- Turnout: 66.78% (of eligible voters) (▼1.89 pp)

Nominee	Kamala Harris	Donald Trump
Party	Democratic	Republican
Home state	California	Florida
Running mate	Tim Walz	JD Vance
Electoral vote	5	0
Popular vote	478,802	423,391
Percentage	51.85%	45.85%

Harris
40–50%
50–60%
60–70%
70–80%
80–90%
90–100%
Trump
40–50%
50–60%
60–70%
70–80%
80–90%
90–100%
Tie/No data
President before election
Joe Biden
Democratic
Elected President
Donald Trump
Republican

The 2024 United States presidential election in New Mexico took place on Tuesday, November 5, 2024, as part of the 2024 United States presidential election in which all 50 states plus the District of Columbia participated. New Mexico voters chose electors to represent them in the Electoral College via a popular vote. The state of New Mexico has five electoral votes in the Electoral College, following reapportionment due to the 2020 United States census in which the state neither gained nor lost a seat.

Before President Joe Biden withdrew, it was considered a battleground state by some. However, after incumbent Vice President Kamala Harris replaced Biden as the Democratic presidential candidate, she was favored to keep New Mexico in the blue column.

Although Harris carried New Mexico, her 6-point margin of victory was the worst for a Democratic presidential candidate in the state since John Kerry, who narrowly lost the state to George W. Bush in 2004. This is the second consecutive election where the state voted to the right of neighboring Colorado, after doing so for the first time since 1968 the previous cycle. This was also the second time in its history that it did not vote for the winner of the national popular vote, after 1976. (Note: In 2000 and 2016, New Mexico voted for the candidate who won the popular vote but not the Electoral College.)

Despite Harris losing significant support among Hispanic voters, she held her own in New Mexico, which has the highest percentage of Hispanics of any state. This was the first time that New Mexico voted for a Democrat who lost the popular vote, and the first time since statehood that any major party candidate won two terms in the White House without ever carrying the state at least once. This also marked the third of only three times since its statehood in 1912 that a non-incumbent Republican won the White House without carrying New Mexico (along with 2000 and 2016).

== Primary elections ==
=== Democratic primary ===
The New Mexico Democratic primary was held on June 4, 2024, alongside primaries in the District of Columbia, Montana, New Jersey, and South Dakota.

New Mexico Democratic primary, June 4, 2024
Candidate	Votes	%	Delegates
Joe Biden (incumbent)	111,049	83.54	34
Marianne Williamson	8,935	6.72	0
Uncommitted Delegate	12,938	9.73	0
Total	132,922	100%	34

=== Republican primary ===
The New Mexico Republican primary was held on June 4, 2024, alongside primaries in Montana, New Jersey, and South Dakota.

New Mexico Republican primary, June 4, 2024
Candidate	Votes	Percentage	Actual delegate count		
Candidate	Votes	Percentage	Bound	Unbound	Total
Donald Trump	78,999	84.5%	22	0	22
Nikki Haley (withdrawn)	8,054	8.6%	0	0	0
Uncommitted	3,130	3.3%	0	0	0
Chris Christie (withdrawn)	2,428	2.6%	0	0	0
Vivek Ramaswamy (withdrawn)	886	0.9%	0	0	0
Total:	93,497	100.00%	22	0	22

=== Libertarian primary ===
The New Mexico Libertarian primary was held on June 6, 2024. 9 days after the 2024 Libertarian National Convention was held.

New Mexico Libertarian primary, June 4, 2024
Candidate	Votes	Percentage
Lars Mapstead	432	56.5%
None of the Above	332	43.5%
Total:	764	100.0%

== General election ==
=== Candidates ===
The following presidential candidates received ballot access in New Mexico:

- Kamala Harris, Democratic Party
- Donald Trump, Republican Party
- Chase Oliver, Libertarian Party
- Jill Stein, Green Party
- Claudia De la Cruz, Party for Socialism and Liberation
- Laura Ebke, Liberal Party USA
- Robert F. Kennedy Jr., Independent (withdrawn)

=== Predictions ===
Source	Ranking	As of
Cook Political Report	Likely D	June 12, 2024
Inside Elections	Solid D	April 26, 2023
Sabato's Crystal Ball	Likely D	June 29, 2023
Decision Desk HQ/The Hill	Likely D	December 14, 2023
CNalysis	Very Likely D	November 1, 2024
CNN	Lean D	January 14, 2024
The Economist	Likely D	August 20, 2024
538	Likely D	June 11, 2024
NBC News	Likely D	October 6, 2024
YouGov	Safe D	October 16, 2024
Split Ticket	Likely D	November 1, 2024

=== Polling ===
Kamala Harris vs. Donald Trump

Poll source	Date(s) administered	Sample size (Note: Key: A – all adults RV – registered voters LV – likely voters V – unclear)	Margin of error	Kamala Harris Democratic	Donald Trump Republican	Other / Undecided
Victory Insights	November 1–3, 2024	600 (LV)	–	49.6%	44.7%	5.7% (Note: "Other" with 5.7%)
SurveyUSA (Note: Poll sponsored by KOB-TV)	October 28–31, 2024	632 (LV)	± 5.5%	50%	44%	6% (Note: "Other" with 3%)
Rasmussen Reports (R) (Note: Poll sponsored by American Thinker)	October 24–26, 2024	749 (LV)	± 3.0%	49%	44%	7% (Note: "Other" with 4%)
Rasmussen Reports (R)	September 19−22, 2024	708 (LV)	± 3.0%	50%	44%	6%
SurveyUSA	September 12–18, 2024	619 (LV)	± 5.4%	50%	42%	8%
	September 10, 2024	The presidential debate between Harris and Trump hosted by ABC				
	August 23, 2024	Robert F. Kennedy Jr. suspends his presidential campaign and endorses Donald Trump.				
	August 22, 2024	Democratic National Convention concludes				
Emerson College	August 20–22, 2024	956 (RV)	± 3.1%	52%	42%	6%
Emerson College	August 20–22, 2024	956 (RV)	± 3.1%	54% (Note: With voters who lean towards a given candidate)	46%	–
	August 19, 2024	Democratic National Convention begins				

Kamala Harris vs. Donald Trump vs. Cornel West vs. Jill Stein vs. Chase Oliver

Poll source	Date(s) administered	Sample size	Margin of error	Kamala Harris Democratic	Donald Trump Republican	Cornel West Independent	Jill Stein Green	Chase Oliver Libertarian	Other / Undecided
Redfield & Wilton Strategies	October 12–14, 2024	382 (LV)	–	49%	45%	–	2%	1%	3%
Redfield & Wilton Strategies	September 6–9, 2024	521 (LV)	–	49%	44%	–	1%	1%	5%

Kamala Harris vs. Donald Trump vs. Robert F. Kennedy Jr. vs. Cornel West vs. Jill Stein vs. Chase Oliver

Poll source	Date(s) administered	Sample size	Margin of error	Kamala Harris Democratic	Donald Trump Republican	Robert F. Kennedy Jr. Independent	Cornel West Independent	Jill Stein Green	Chase Oliver Libertarian	Other / Undecided
Emerson College	August 20–22, 2024	956 (RV)	± 3.1%	51%	40%	3%	0%	0%	0%	6%
Redfield & Wilton Strategies	August 12–15, 2024	592 (LV)	–	47%	41%	6%	–	0%	0%	6%
Redfield & Wilton Strategies	July 31 – August 3, 2024	493 (LV)	–	44%	37%	8%	–	0%	0%	11%

Kamala Harris vs. Donald Trump vs. Robert F. Kennedy Jr.

Poll source	Date(s) administered	Sample size	Margin of error	Kamala Harris Democratic	Donald Trump Republican	Robert F. Kennedy Jr. Independent	Other / Undecided
Research & Polling Inc. (Note: Poll conducted for the Albuquerque Journal)	October 10–18, 2024	1,024 (LV)	± 3.1%	50%	41%	3%	6%
Research & Polling Inc.	September 6–13, 2024	532 (LV)	± 4.2%	49%	39%	3%	9%

Hypothetical polling with Joe Biden and Donald Trump

Joe Biden vs. Donald Trump

Poll source	Date(s) administered	Sample size	Margin of error	Joe Biden Democratic	Donald Trump Republican	Other / Undecided
1892 Polling (R) (Note: Poll commissioned by the National Republican Senatorial Committee)	June 19–24, 2024	600 (LV)	± 4.0%	49%	47%	5%
Public Policy Polling (D) (Note: Poll commissioned by the New Mexico Political Report)	June 13–14, 2024	555 (V)	± 4.2%	48%	41%	11%
John Zogby Strategies (Note: Poll conducted for Kennedy's campaign)	April 13–21, 2024	505 (LV)	–	49%	42%	9%
Public Policy Polling (D)	August 23–24, 2023	767 (RV)	± 3.5%	49%	41%	10%
Public Opinion Strategies (R)	May 6–8, 2023	500 (LV)	–	49%	38%	13%
Emerson College	October 25–28, 2022	1,000 (LV)	± 3.0%	48%	38%	14%
Emerson College	September 8–11, 2022	1,000 (LV)	± 3.0%	47%	41%	12%

Joe Biden vs. Donald Trump vs. Robert F. Kennedy Jr. vs. Jill Stein vs. Chase Oliver vs. Randall Terry

Poll source	Date(s) administered	Sample size	Margin of error	Joe Biden Democratic	Donald Trump Republican	Robert F. Kennedy Jr. Independent	Jill Stein Green	Chase Oliver Libertarian	Randall Terry Constitution	Other / Undecided
1892 Polling (R)	June 19–24, 2024	600 (LV)	± 4.0%	43%	42%	8%	3%	2%	1%	3%

Hypothetical polling with other candidates

Joe Biden vs. Robert F. Kennedy Jr.

Poll source	Date(s) administered	Sample size	Margin of error	Joe Biden Democratic	Robert F. Kennedy Jr. Independent	Other / Undecided
John Zogby Strategies	April 13–21, 2024	505 (LV)	–	41%	46%	13%

Robert F. Kennedy Jr. vs. Donald Trump

Poll source	Date(s) administered	Sample size	Margin of error	Robert F. Kennedy Jr. Independent	Donald Trump Republican	Other / Undecided
John Zogby Strategies	April 13–21, 2024	505 (LV)	–	46%	36%	18%

Joe Biden vs. Ron DeSantis

Poll source	Date(s) administered	Sample size	Margin of error	Joe Biden Democratic	Ron DeSantis Republican	Other / Undecided
Public Policy Polling (D)	August 23–24, 2023	767 (LV)	± 3.5%	48%	43%	9%
Public Opinion Strategies (R)	May 6–8, 2023	500 (LV)	–	45%	43%	12%

=== Results ===
State House district results: Trump 40–50% 50–60% 60–70% 70–80% 80–90% / Harris 50–60% 60–70% 70–80% 80–90%

2024 United States presidential election in New Mexico
Party	Candidate	Votes	%	±%
Democratic	Kamala Harris; Tim Walz	478,802	51.85	−2.44
Republican	Donald Trump; JD Vance	423,391	45.85	+2.35
Independent	Robert F. Kennedy Jr. (withdrawn); Nicole Shanahan (withdrawn)	9,553	1.03	N/A
Green	Jill Stein; Butch Ware	4,611	0.50	+0.02
Free New Mexico	Chase Oliver (Note: The Free New Mexico Party is the state affiliate of the national Libertarian Party, which nominated Oliver and ter Maat. The Libertarian Party of New Mexico, which separated from the national party in 2022 and is now affiliated to Liberal Party USA, nominated Ebke and Butler.); Mike ter Maat	3,745	0.41	−0.95
Socialism and Liberation	Claudia De la Cruz; Karina Garcia	2,442	0.26	+0.08
Liberal	Laura Ebke; Tricia Butler	859	0.09	N/A
Total votes		923,403	100.00	N/A
Democratic win				

==== By county ====
County	Kamala Harris Democratic		Donald Trump Republican		Various candidates Other parties		Margin		Total
County	#	%	#	%	#	%	#	%	Total
Bernalillo	184,117	59.23%	118,762	38.21%	7,965	2.56%	65,355	21.03%	310,844
Catron	571	24.23%	1,752	74.33%	34	1.44%	-1,181	-50.11%	2,357
Chaves	5,941	26.76%	15,894	71.59%	365	1.64%	-9,953	-44.83%	22,200
Cibola	4,450	49.57%	4,311	48.02%	216	2.41%	139	1.55%	8,977
Colfax	2,436	41.91%	3,252	55.94%	125	2.15%	-816	-14.04%	5,813
Curry	4,230	27.79%	10,714	70.38%	279	1.83%	-6,484	-42.59%	15,223
De Baca	206	23.57%	649	74.26%	19	2.17%	-443	-50.69%	874
Doña Ana	45,937	53.79%	37,594	44.02%	1,876	2.20%	8,343	9.77%	85,407
Eddy	5,032	21.44%	18,141	77.29%	299	1.27%	-13,109	-55.85%	23,472
Grant	7,301	51.33%	6,580	46.26%	343	2.41%	721	5.07%	14,224
Guadalupe	959	49.48%	945	48.76%	34	1.75%	14	0.72%	1,938
Harding	128	29.70%	297	68.91%	6	1.39%	-169	-39.21%	431
Hidalgo	705	37.86%	1,140	61.22%	17	0.91%	-435	-23.36%	1,862
Lea	3,930	18.53%	16,997	80.14%	282	1.33%	-13,067	-61.61%	21,209
Lincoln	3,033	29.84%	6,942	68.29%	190	1.87%	-3,909	-38.46%	10,165
Los Alamos	7,726	63.40%	4,047	33.21%	414	3.40%	3,679	30.19%	12,187
Luna	3,176	39.42%	4,698	58.32%	182	2.26%	-1,522	-18.89%	8,056
McKinley	15,711	60.74%	9,364	36.20%	792	3.06%	6,347	24.54%	25,867
Mora	1,439	57.86%	1,010	40.61%	38	1.53%	429	17.25%	2,487
Otero	8,582	35.40%	15,117	62.36%	543	2.24%	-6,535	-26.96%	24,242
Quay	1,055	28.48%	2,570	69.38%	79	2.13%	-1,515	-40.90%	3,704
Rio Arriba	9,373	58.62%	6,268	39.20%	348	2.18%	3,105	19.42%	15,989
Roosevelt	1,820	27.41%	4,687	70.60%	132	1.99%	-2,867	-43.18%	6,639
San Juan	17,464	33.00%	34,264	64.74%	1,198	2.26%	-16,800	-31.74%	52,926
San Miguel	6,985	62.88%	3,887	34.99%	236	2.12%	3,098	27.89%	11,108
Sandoval	41,205	51.80%	36,605	46.02%	1,730	2.18%	4,600	5.78%	79,540
Santa Fe	61,405	73.35%	20,457	24.44%	1,857	2.22%	40,948	48.91%	83,719
Sierra	2,332	39.17%	3,473	58.34%	148	2.49%	-1,141	-19.17%	5,953
Socorro	3,384	46.79%	3,651	50.48%	198	2.74%	-267	-3.69%	7,233
Taos	12,038	72.36%	4,139	24.88%	459	2.76%	7,899	47.48%	16,636
Torrance	2,144	29.86%	4,880	67.98%	155	2.16%	-2,736	-38.11%	7,179
Union	378	22.70%	1,247	74.89%	40	2.40%	-869	-52.19%	1,665
Valencia	13,609	40.90%	19,057	57.27%	611	1.84%	-5,448	-16.37%	33,277
Totals	478,802	51.85%	423,391	45.85%	21,210	2.30%	55,411	6.00%	923,403

County that flipped from Democratic to Republican

- Socorro (largest city: Socorro)

==== By congressional district ====
Harris won two of three congressional districts, with Trump winning the remaining one, which elected a Democrat.

District	Harris	Trump	Representative
1st	55.06%	42.39%	Melanie Stansbury
2nd	48.05%	49.86%	Gabe Vasquez
3rd	51.51%	46.31%	Teresa Leger Fernandez

== Analysis ==
A Southwestern state, New Mexico is a moderately blue state. The last Republican to win the state's electoral votes was George W. Bush from neighboring Texas in 2004. Democrats have held all statewide offices since 2019, and Democratic presidential candidates have consistently won the state starting in 2008.

New Mexico voted 7.5% to the left of the nation in this election, about 1 percent more Democratic than in 2020, during which it voted 6.3% to the left of the nation. Trump flipped majority-Hispanic Socorro County, becoming the first Republican to win the county since George H. W. Bush in 1988. Also, Trump won Lea County with 80.1% of the vote, marking the first time ever that a Republican presidential candidate won over 80% of any New Mexico county's vote. It also marked the first time any candidate of either party did so since 2008, when Barack Obama carried Taos County with nearly 82% of the vote.

This is only the second time since statehood that New Mexico voted for the popular vote loser, after 1976, and the first time ever that it voted for a Democrat who lost the popular vote. Trump is the first president to win two terms without ever carrying New Mexico, since it became a state. This is the first election since 1976 that the state voted for the loser of both the popular and electoral vote. It is also the second time since statehood that it voted for a different candidate than Nevada, another Southwestern state, after 2000.

== See also ==
- United States presidential elections in New Mexico
- 2024 United States presidential election
- 2024 Democratic Party presidential primaries
- 2024 Republican Party presidential primaries
- 2024 United States elections

== Notes ==
Partisan clients
