= 2008 United States presidential election in New Mexico =

- November 4, 2008

Nominee	Barack Obama	John McCain
Party	Democratic	Republican
Home state	Illinois	Arizona
Running mate	Joe Biden	Sarah Palin
Electoral vote	5	0
Popular vote	472,422	346,832
Percentage	56.91%	41.78%

Obama
50–60%
60–70%
70–80%
80–90%
McCain
40–50%
50–60%
60–70%
70–80%
President before election
George W. Bush
Republican
Elected President
Barack Obama
Democratic

The 2008 United States presidential election in New Mexico took place on November 4, 2008. Voters chose five representatives, or electors to the Electoral College, who voted for president and vice president.

New Mexico was won by the Democratic nominee, Senator Barack Obama of Illinois, by a 15.13% margin of victory; Obama took 56.91% of the vote while his Republican opponent, Senator John McCain of Arizona, took 41.78%. Prior to the election, all 17 news organizations considered this a state Obama would win, or otherwise considered it as a safe blue state. Due to the extremely narrow margins of victory in the previous two presidential elections (less than 1% in 2004 and less than 0.1% in 2000), it started out as a swing state, but hypothetical general election match-up polls taken in the state continued to show a big lead for Obama. Obama's polling advantage in New Mexico increased so much that McCain did not campaign nearly as much there as he did elsewhere, despite it neighboring his home state of Arizona.

A large Hispanic and Native American as well as a trending Democratic population put Obama over the top. Obama became the first Democrat since Lyndon B. Johnson in 1964 to win a majority of New Mexico's vote in a presidential election. Obama's winning margin of over 125,000 votes is the largest in history for a presidential candidate in New Mexico.

To date, this is the most recent time a Democrat carried Luna County.

== Primaries ==
- 2008 New Mexico Democratic primary
- 2008 New Mexico Republican primary

== Campaign ==
=== Predictions ===
There were 16 news organizations that made state-by-state predictions of the election. Here are their last predictions before election day:

Source	Ranking
D.C. Political Report	Likely D (flip)
Cook Political Report	Lean D (flip)
The Takeaway	Solid D (flip)
Electoral-vote.com	Lean D (flip)
Washington Post	Lean D (flip)
Politico	Lean D (flip)
RealClearPolitics	Lean D (flip)
FiveThirtyEight	Solid D (flip)
CQ Politics	Safe D (flip)
The New York Times	Solid D (flip)
CNN	Lean D (flip)
NPR	Solid D (flip)
MSNBC	Lean D (flip)
Fox News	Likely D (flip)
Associated Press	Likely D (flip)
Rasmussen Reports	Safe D (flip)

=== Polling ===
Obama won a majority of the pre-election polls taken in the state, including sweeping all of them taken after September 14. The final three polls averaged the Democrat leading 55% to 43%.

=== Fundraising ===
John McCain raised a total of $1,016,376 in the state. Barack Obama raised $3,987,438.

=== Advertising and visits ===
Obama and his interest groups spent $4,535,378. McCain and his interest groups spent $3,606,796. The Democratic ticket visited the state five times to the Republicans' eight times.

== Analysis ==
Hispanic voters comprised 41% of New Mexico's electorate in 2008 and make up a plurality of the state's population. George W. Bush received over 40% of the Hispanic vote nationally in 2004. This support was enough for Bush to nip John Kerry by approximately 6,000 votes in New Mexico in 2004. In the previous two elections, New Mexico had been a very close swing state. Al Gore won the state by 300 votes in 2000, which was even narrower than the controversial results in Florida. However, during the 2008 election, New Mexico was regarded as a safe state for Obama. John McCain from neighboring Arizona and held similar views on illegal immigration to those of Bush. Ultimately, McCain obtained 31% of the national Hispanic vote to Obama's 67%, far less than Bush's 44% to John Kerry's 53% in 2004.

Native Americans also represent a key voting demographic in New Mexico. Obama won the Native American vote, 78–21%, and carried most of the counties within the confines of the Navajo Nation. The Republican base in New Mexico consists of the more rural and thinly-populated southeastern part of the state. Democrats are strongest in the state capital, Santa Fe, and its close-in suburbs. The city of Albuquerque and the southwestern part of the state both lean Democratic, but not as overwhelmingly as Santa Fe.

In 2008, Obama carried the state by a 15-point margin, largely by dominating the Albuquerque area. It was his strongest performance in a state which had voted for Bush in the previous election. He won Bernalillo County, home to Albuquerque itself, by 21 points; Kerry had won it by four points in 2004. While McCain dominated the southeastern part of the state, it was not nearly enough to overcome Obama's edge in the Albuquerque area. As of the 2024 presidential election, this is the last election in which Luna County voted for the Democratic candidate.

During the same election, former Democratic U.S. Representative Tom Udall, who had represented New Mexico's 3rd Congressional District in the U.S. House of Representatives, defeated former Republican U.S. Representative Steve Pearce, who had represented New Mexico's 2nd congressional district, for an open U.S. Senate seat that was vacated by Republican Pete Domenici once it was discovered that he had brain cancer. Former Republican U.S. Representative Heather Wilson, who represented New Mexico's 1st Congressional District, vacated her seat to challenge Pearce in the GOP senatorial primary only to lose the nomination to him. As a result, all three of New Mexico's U.S. House seats were up for grabs, and Democrats captured all three of them. At the state level, Democrats increased their majorities in both houses of the New Mexico Legislature, picking up three seats in both the New Mexico House of Representatives and New Mexico Senate.

== Results ==
2008 United States presidential election in New Mexico
Party	Candidate	Votes	%	±%
Democratic	Barack Obama; Joe Biden	472,422	56.91%	+7.86
Republican	John McCain; Sarah Palin	346,832	41.78%	−8.06
Independent	Ralph Nader; Matt Gonzalez	5,327	0.64%	+0.10
Libertarian	Bob Barr; Wayne Allyn Root	2,428	0.29%	−0.02
Constitution	Chuck Baldwin; Darrell Castle	1,597	0.19%	+0.09
Green	Cynthia McKinney; Rosa Clemente	1,552	0.19%	+0.03
Total votes		830,158	100.00%	
Democratic win				

=== By county ===
County	Barack Obama Democratic		John McCain Republican		Various candidates Other parties		Margin		Total votes cast
County	#	%	#	%	#	%	#	%	Total votes cast
Bernalillo	171,556	60.03%	110,521	38.67%	3,701	1.30%	61,035	21.36%	285,778
Catron	664	31.44%	1,398	66.19%	50	2.37%	-734	-34.75%	2,112
Chaves	8,197	37.07%	13,651	61.74%	264	1.19%	-5,454	-24.67%	22,112
Cibola	5,827	64.05%	3,131	34.42%	139	1.53%	2,696	29.63%	9,097
Colfax	3,490	54.67%	2,805	43.94%	89	1.39%	685	10.73%	6,384
Curry	4,670	32.35%	9,599	66.48%	169	1.17%	-4,929	-34.13%	14,438
De Baca	359	34.39%	676	64.75%	9	0.86%	-317	-30.36%	1,044
Dona Ana	40,282	58.14%	28,068	40.51%	930	1.35%	12,214	17.63%	69,280
Eddy	7,351	36.58%	12,500	62.21%	242	1.21%	-5,149	-25.63%	20,093
Grant	8,142	59.19%	5,406	39.30%	207	1.51%	2,736	19.89%	13,755
Guadalupe	1,557	70.90%	620	28.23%	19	0.87%	937	42.67%	2,196
Harding	260	41.53%	358	57.19%	8	1.28%	-98	-15.66%	626
Hidalgo	993	50.90%	936	47.98%	22	1.12%	57	2.92%	1,951
Lea	5,108	27.40%	13,347	71.58%	190	1.02%	-8,239	-44.18%	18,645
Lincoln	3,535	36.46%	6,001	61.89%	160	1.65%	-2,466	-25.43%	9,696
Los Alamos	5,824	52.62%	5,064	45.75%	181	1.63%	760	6.87%	11,069
Luna	4,311	51.69%	3,870	46.40%	159	1.91%	441	5.29%	8,340
McKinley	16,572	71.41%	6,382	27.50%	253	1.09%	10,190	43.91%	23,207
Mora	2,168	78.55%	569	20.62%	23	0.83%	1,599	57.93%	2,760
Otero	8,610	39.56%	12,806	58.83%	350	1.61%	-4,196	-19.27%	21,766
Quay	1,547	38.71%	2,367	59.23%	82	2.06%	-820	-20.52%	3,996
Rio Arriba	12,703	74.99%	4,086	24.12%	151	0.89%	8,617	50.87%	16,940
Roosevelt	2,303	34.27%	4,311	64.15%	106	1.58%	-2,008	-29.88%	6,720
Sandoval	32,669	55.72%	25,193	42.97%	768	1.31%	7,476	12.75%	58,630
San Juan	18,028	38.76%	27,869	59.92%	614	1.32%	-9,841	-21.16%	46,511
San Miguel	10,320	79.75%	2,478	19.15%	143	1.10%	7,842	60.60%	12,941
Santa Fe	55,567	76.94%	15,807	21.89%	849	1.17%	39,760	55.05%	72,223
Sierra	2,352	42.88%	3,017	55.00%	116	2.12%	-665	-12.12%	5,485
Socorro	4,696	59.48%	3,032	38.40%	167	2.12%	1,664	21.08%	7,895
Taos	13,816	81.82%	2,866	16.97%	204	1.21%	10,950	64.85%	16,886
Torrance	3,087	44.47%	3,735	53.81%	119	1.72%	-648	-9.34%	6,941
Union	492	28.24%	1,227	70.44%	23	1.32%	-735	-42.20%	1,742
Valencia	15,366	53.17%	13,136	45.45%	397	1.38%	2,230	7.72%	28,899
Total	472,422	56.91%	346,832	41.78%	10,904	1.31%	125,590	15.13%	830,158

Counties that flipped from Republican to Democratic

- Colfax (largest city: Raton)
- Hidalgo (largest city: Lordsburg)
- Los Alamos (largest city: Los Alamos)
- Luna (largest city: Deming)
- Sandoval (largest city: Rio Rancho)
- Valencia (largest village: Los Lunas)

=== By congressional district ===
Barack Obama carried two of the state's three congressional districts, while John McCain just narrowly carried the other congressional district that simultaneously elected a Democrat.

District	McCain	Obama	Representative
1st	39.64%	60.07%	Heather Wilson (110th Congress)
1st	39.64%	60.07%	Martin Heinrich (111th Congress)
2nd	49.97%	48.64%	Steve Pearce (110th Congress)
2nd	49.97%	48.64%	Harry Teague (111th Congress)
3rd	37.79%	61.01%	Tom Udall (110th Congress)
3rd	37.79%	61.01%	Ben R. Luján (111th Congress)

== Electors ==
Officially the voters of New Mexico cast their ballots for electors: representatives to the Electoral College. New Mexico is allocated five electors because it has three congressional districts and two senators. All candidates who appear on the ballot or qualify to receive write-in votes must submit a list of five electors, who pledge to vote for their candidate and their running mate. Whoever wins the majority of votes in the state is awarded all five electoral votes. Their chosen electors then vote for president and vice president. Although electors are pledged to their candidate and running mate, they are not obligated to vote for them. An elector who votes for someone other than their candidate is known as a faithless elector.

The electors of each state and of the District of Columbia met on December 15, 2008, to cast their votes for president and vice president. The Electoral College itself never meets as one body; instead the electors from each state and the District of Columbia meet in their respective capitols.

The following were the members of the Electoral College from the state. All five were pledged to Barack Obama and Joe Biden:

1. Brian Colon
2. Annadelle Sanchez
3. Tom Buckner
4. Christy French
5. Alvin Warren
