= Chaves County, New Mexico =

County in New Mexico, United States

- County
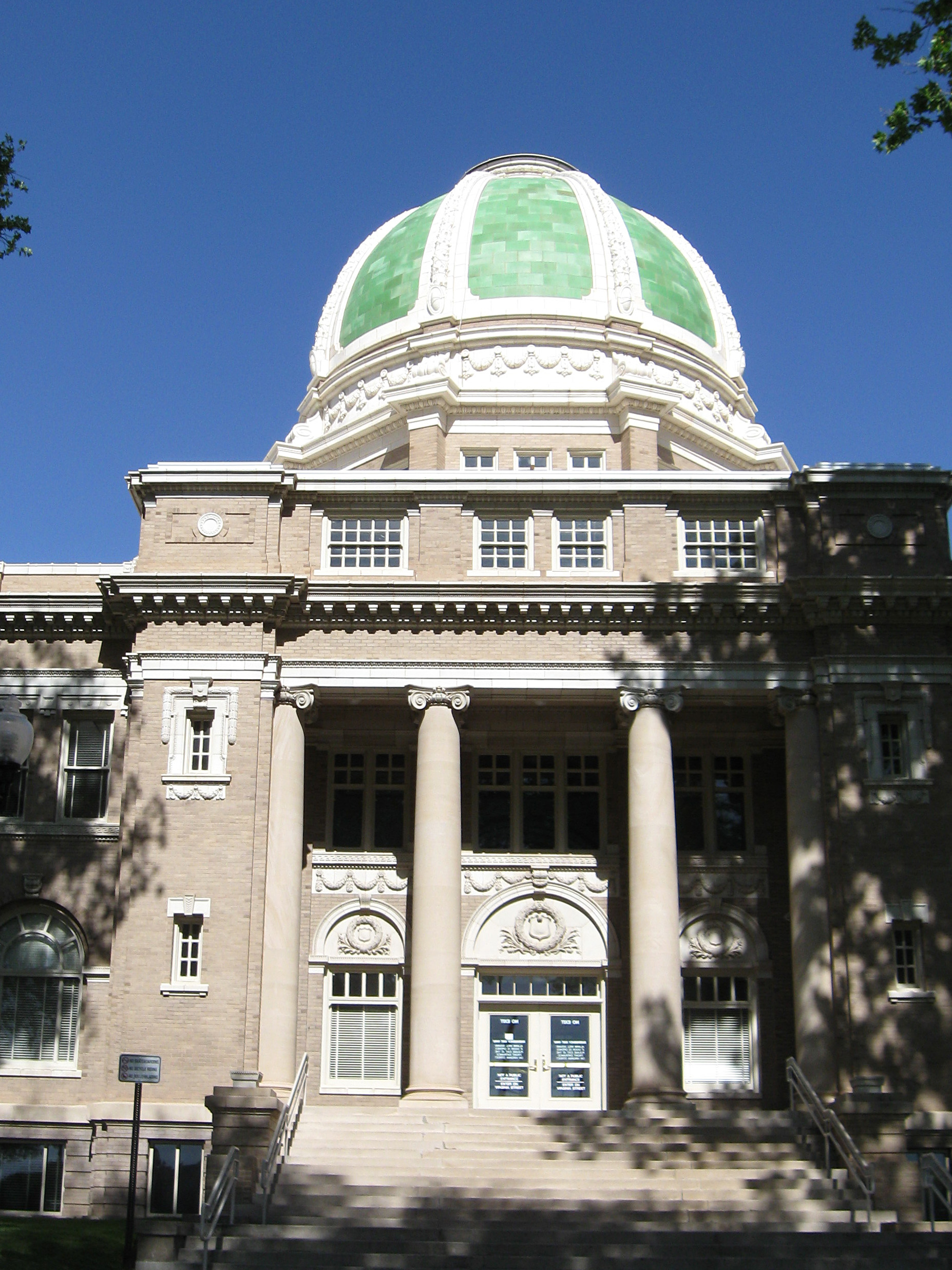
- Chaves County Courthouse in Roswell

- Seal

- Location within the U.S. state of New Mexico
- Coordinates: 33°22′N 104°28′W
- Country: United States
- State: New Mexico
- Founded: February 25, 1889
- Named for: José Francisco Chaves
- Seat: Roswell
- Largest city: Roswell

Area
  - Total: 6,075 sq mi (15,730 km^{2})
  - Land: 6,065 sq mi (15,710 km^{2})
  - Water: 9.8 sq mi (25 km^{2}) 0.2%

Population (2020)
  - Total: 65,157
  - Estimate (2025): 63,364 ▼
  - Density: 11/sq mi (4.2/km^{2})
- Time zone: UTC−7 (Mountain)
  - Summer (DST): UTC−6 (MDT)
- Congressional districts: 1st, 2nd, 3rd
- Website: www.chavescounty.gov

Chaves County is a county in New Mexico, United States. As of the 2020 census, the population was 65,157. Its county seat is Roswell. Chaves County was named for Colonel Jose Francisco Chaves, a military leader there during the Civil War and later in Navajo campaigns. The county was created by the New Mexico Territorial Legislature on February 25, 1889, out of land from Lincoln County.

Chaves County comprises the Roswell, New Mexico Micropolitan Statistical Area.

== Geography ==
According to the U.S. Census Bureau, the county has a total area of 6,075 square miles (15,730 km^{2}), of which 6,065 square miles (15,710 km^{2}) is land and 9.8 square miles (25 km^{2}) (0.2%) is water. It is the fourth-largest county in New Mexico by area.

=== Adjacent counties ===
- De Baca County - north
- Roosevelt County - northeast
- Lea County - east
- Eddy County - south
- Otero County - southwest
- Lincoln County - west

=== National protected areas ===
- Bitter Lake National Wildlife Refuge
- Lincoln National Forest (part)

== Demographics ==
Historical population
Census	Pop.	Note	%±
1900	4,773		—
1910	16,850		253.0%
1920	12,075		−28.3%
1930	19,549		61.9%
1940	23,980		22.7%
1950	40,605		69.3%
1960	57,649		42.0%
1970	43,335		−24.8%
1980	51,103		17.9%
1990	57,849		13.2%
2000	61,382		6.1%
2010	65,645		6.9%
2020	65,157		−0.7%
2025 (est.)	63,364	▼	−2.8%
U.S. Decennial Census; 1790-1960 1900-1990; 1990-2000 2010

=== 2020 census ===
As of the 2020 census, the county had a population of 65,157. The median age was 36.1 years, with 26.4% of residents under the age of 18 and 15.9% aged 65 or older. For every 100 females there were 99.7 males, and for every 100 females age 18 and over there were 98.4 males age 18 and over.

Chaves County, New Mexico – Racial and ethnic composition Note: the US Census treats Hispanic/Latino as an ethnic category. This table excludes Latinos from the racial categories and assigns them to a separate category. Hispanics/Latinos may be of any race.
Race / Ethnicity (NH = Non-Hispanic)	Pop 2000	Pop 2010	Pop 2020	% 2000	% 2010	% 2020
White alone (NH)	31,970	28,801	24,445	52.08%	43.87%	37.52%
Black or African American alone (NH)	1,088	1,079	947	1.77%	1.64%	1.45%
Native American or Alaska Native alone (NH)	410	458	411	0.67%	0.70%	0.63%
Asian alone (NH)	290	373	611	0.47%	0.57%	0.94%
Pacific Islander alone (NH)	13	29	29	0.02%	0.04%	0.04%
Other race alone (NH)	55	120	258	0.09%	0.18%	0.40%
Mixed race or Multiracial (NH)	652	646	1,359	1.06%	0.98%	2.09%
Hispanic or Latino (any race)	26,904	34,139	37,097	43.83%	52.01%	56.93%
Total	61,382	65,645	65,157	100.00%	100.00%	100.00%

The racial makeup of the county was 56.2% White, 1.9% Black or African American, 1.4% American Indian and Alaska Native, 1.0% Asian, 0.1% Native Hawaiian and Pacific Islander, 20.6% from some other race, and 18.8% from two or more races. Hispanic or Latino residents of any race comprised 56.9% of the population.

74.9% of residents lived in urban areas, while 25.1% lived in rural areas.

There were 23,521 households in the county, of which 35.8% had children under the age of 18 living with them and 27.7% had a female householder with no spouse or partner present. About 26.7% of all households were made up of individuals and 11.7% had someone living alone who was 65 years of age or older.

There were 26,658 housing units, of which 11.8% were vacant. Among occupied housing units, 67.8% were owner-occupied and 32.2% were renter-occupied. The homeowner vacancy rate was 2.2% and the rental vacancy rate was 9.4%.

=== 2010 census ===
As of the 2010 census, there were 65,645 people, 23,691 households, and 16,646 families living in the county. The population density was 10.8 inhabitants per square mile (4.2 inhabitants/km^{2}). There were 26,697 housing units at an average density of 4.4 units per square mile (1.7 units/km^{2}). The racial makeup of the county was 70.9% white, 2.0% black or African American, 1.2% American Indian, 0.6% Asian, 0.1% Pacific islander, 21.9% from other races, and 3.2% from two or more races. Those of Hispanic or Latino origin made up 52.0% of the population. In terms of ancestry, 10.1% were German, 9.3% were Irish, 8.5% were English, and 4.6% were American.

Of the 23,691 households, 37.7% had children under the age of 18 living with them, 48.9% were married couples living together, 14.9% had a female householder with no husband present, 29.7% were non-families, and 25.2% of all households were made up of individuals. The average household size was 2.70 and the average family size was 3.22. The median age was 34.7 years.

The median income for a household in the county was $37,524 and the median income for a family was $43,464. Males had a median income of $37,573 versus $26,250 for females. The per capita income for the county was $18,504. About 15.9% of families and 21.0% of the population were below the poverty line, including 27.1% of those under age 18 and 14.6% of those age 65 or over.

=== 2000 census ===
As of the 2000 census, there were 61,382 people, 22,561 households, and 16,085 families living in the county. The population density was 10 people per square mile (3.9 people/km^{2}). There were 25,647 housing units at an average density of 4 units per square mile (1.5/km^{2}). The racial makeup of the county was 71.95% White, 1.97% Black or African American, 1.13% Native American, 0.53% Asian, 0.06% Pacific Islander, 21.25% from other races, and 3.12% from two or more races. 43.83% of the population were Hispanic or Latino of any race.

There were 22,561 households, out of which 35.60% had children under the age of 18 living with them, 52.70% were married couples living together, 13.70% had a female householder with no husband present, and 28.70% were non-families. 24.80% of all households were made up of individuals, and 11.60% had someone living alone who was 65 years of age or older. The average household size was 2.66 and the average family size was 3.17.

In the county, the population was spread out, with 29.10% under the age of 18, 9.40% from 18 to 24, 25.30% from 25 to 44, 21.50% from 45 to 64, and 14.70% who were 65 years of age or older. The median age was 35 years. For every 100 females there were 95.90 males. For every 100 females age 18 and over, there were 91.60 males.

The median income for a household in the county was $28,513, and the median income for a family was $32,532. Males had a median income of $26,896 versus $21,205 for females. The per capita income for the county was $14,990. About 17.60% of families and 21.30% of the population were below the poverty line, including 29.10% of those under age 18 and 13.90% of those age 65 or over.

== Politics ==
Chaves County is a Republican stronghold. No Democratic presidential candidate has won Chaves County since Lyndon Johnson's landslide victory of 1964. Even in that election, Johnson took Chaves County by only 1.3 percent.

United States presidential election results for Chaves County, New Mexico
Year	Republican		Democratic		Third party(ies)	
Year	No.	%	No.	%	No.	%
1912	465	18.24%	1,339	52.53%	745	29.23%
1916	862	25.90%	2,275	68.36%	191	5.74%
1920	1,765	45.54%	2,080	53.66%	31	0.80%
1924	1,519	39.40%	2,168	56.24%	168	4.36%
1928	3,124	69.48%	1,364	30.34%	8	0.18%
1932	1,830	28.95%	4,257	67.34%	235	3.72%
1936	2,505	35.70%	4,394	62.62%	118	1.68%
1940	2,981	40.84%	4,304	58.97%	14	0.19%
1944	3,149	48.33%	3,350	51.41%	17	0.26%
1948	3,123	40.43%	4,569	59.15%	33	0.43%
1952	7,018	63.92%	3,880	35.34%	81	0.74%
1956	7,538	63.37%	4,270	35.89%	88	0.74%
1960	9,089	59.05%	6,212	40.36%	91	0.59%
1964	8,419	49.20%	8,650	50.55%	43	0.25%
1968	8,866	63.61%	3,612	25.91%	1,460	10.47%
1972	11,493	70.87%	4,296	26.49%	427	2.63%
1976	10,631	59.26%	7,139	39.79%	170	0.95%
1980	12,502	67.24%	5,350	28.77%	742	3.99%
1984	15,248	73.37%	5,332	25.66%	202	0.97%
1988	13,367	65.84%	6,730	33.15%	206	1.01%
1992	8,872	46.95%	6,360	33.65%	3,666	19.40%
1996	9,991	53.95%	7,014	37.87%	1,514	8.18%
2000	11,378	62.69%	6,340	34.93%	431	2.37%
2004	14,773	68.06%	6,726	30.99%	206	0.95%
2008	13,651	61.74%	8,197	37.07%	264	1.19%
2012	13,088	64.50%	6,604	32.54%	600	2.96%
2016	12,872	63.50%	5,534	27.30%	1,865	9.20%
2020	15,656	69.76%	6,381	28.43%	406	1.81%
2024	15,894	71.59%	5,941	26.76%	365	1.64%

== Communities ==
=== City ===
- Roswell (county seat)

=== Towns ===
- Dexter
- Hagerman
- Lake Arthur

=== Census-designated place ===
- Midway
- Mountain View

=== Unincorporated communities ===
- Dunken
- Elk
- Elkins
- Greenfield
- Mesa

== Education ==
School districts include:

- Artesia Public Schools
- Dexter Consolidated Schools
- Elida Municipal Schools
- Hagerman Municipal Schools
- Lake Arthur Municipal Schools
- Roswell Independent Schools
- Tatum Municipal Schools

== Notable people ==
- Jacqueline Wonsetler (1918–1974), American meteorologist

== Transportation ==
=== Major highways ===
- US 70
- US 82
- US 285
- US 380
- NM 2
- NM 13
- NM 24
- NM 172
- NM 190
- NM 246
- NM 249
- NM 253
- NM 254
- NM 255
- NM 256
- NM 261
- NM 339
- NM 340
- NM 409
- NM 438
- NM 507
- NM 558
- NM 560

== See also ==
- National Register of Historic Places listings in Chaves County, New Mexico
