= Mountain View, Chaves County, New Mexico =

Mountain View, New Mexico
- Unincorporated community
- Location within New Mexico
- Coordinates: 33°20′24″N 104°31′24″W
- Country: United States
- State: New Mexico
- County: Chaves
- Elevation: 3,629 ft (1,106 m)
- Time zone: UTC-7 (Mountain (MST))
  - Summer (DST): UTC-6 (MDT)
- Area code: 575
- GNIS feature ID: 899807

Mountain View is an unincorporated community in Chaves County, New Mexico, United States. Mountain View is 3.7 miles (6.0 km) south of downtown Roswell.
