= 2004 United States presidential election in New Mexico =

- November 2, 2004
- Turnout: 68.4% (of registered voters); 55.1% (of voting age population)

Nominee	George W. Bush	John Kerry
Party	Republican	Democratic
Home state	Texas	Massachusetts
Running mate	Dick Cheney	John Edwards
Electoral vote	5	0
Popular vote	376,930	370,942
Percentage	49.84%	49.05%

Bush
50–60%
60–70%
70–80%
Kerry
50–60%
60–70%
70–80%
President before election
George W. Bush
Republican
Elected President
George W. Bush
Republican

The 2004 United States presidential election in New Mexico took place on November 2, 2004, and was part of the 2004 United States presidential election. Voters chose five representatives, or electors to the Electoral College, who voted for president and vice president.

New Mexico was won by incumbent Republican President George W. Bush by a 0.79% margin of victory. Bush took 49.84% of the vote, narrowly defeating Democratic Senator of Massachusetts John Kerry, who took 49.05%. Prior to the election, most news organizations considered it as a swing state. New Mexico is a very diverse state, with 42% of the state Hispanic and another 42% of the electorate non-Hispanic white. Exit polling showed that incumbent George W. Bush performed better among Hispanic Americans in 2004 than in 2000. This may be one of the reasons why Bush won and swung the state from 2000, when Al Gore had narrowly won the state.

New Mexico was one of the only three states which switched sides between 2000 and 2004 (Iowa also flipped from Gore to Bush, while New Hampshire flipped from Bush to Kerry). Bush is the only Republican presidential nominee to win New Mexico since his father in 1988. As of the 2024 presidential election, this is the last time the Republican nominee won Los Alamos County and Sandoval County.

== Caucuses ==
- 2004 New Mexico Democratic presidential caucuses

== Campaign ==
=== Predictions ===
There were 12 news organizations who made state-by-state predictions of the election. Here are their last predictions before election day.

Source	Ranking
D.C. Political Report	Lean D
Associated Press	Toss-up
CNN	Lean R (flip)
Cook Political Report	Toss-up
Newsweek	Toss-up
New York Times	Toss-up
Rasmussen Reports	Toss-up
Research 2000	Lean D
Washington Post	Toss-up
Washington Times	Toss-up
Zogby International	Likely D
Washington Dispatch	Likely R (flip)

=== Polling ===
Polls showed Kerry in the lead for most of the general election. However, Bush caught up in the last month. The last 3 polling average showed Bush leading with 48% to 46%, which meant that the undecided voters would decide the election.

=== Fundraising ===
Bush raised $869,407. Kerry raised $1,289,134.

=== Advertising and visits ===
Because of the closeness of the prior election, New Mexico was largely considered as a swing state. Over the general election, Bush visited the state 5 times and Kerry visited 8 times. Nearly $2 million were spent by both campaigns combined in television advertisements each week.

== Analysis ==
Although Bill Richardson, the Democratic governor, was very popular, the state, which voted for Al Gore by 366 votes in 2000, chose George W. Bush in 2004, by about 6,000 votes. The only county Bush won in 2004 that he didn't win in 2000 was Colfax County. Half of the population in New Mexico is Hispanic, and Bush was able to appeal to over 40% of the Hispanic vote.

== Results ==
2004 United States presidential election in New Mexico
Party	Candidate	Votes	%	±%
Republican	George W. Bush (incumbent); Dick Cheney (incumbent)	376,930	49.84%	+1.99
Democratic	John Kerry; John Edwards	370,942	49.05%	+1.14
Independent	Ralph Nader; Peter Camejo	4,053	0.54%	−3.01
Libertarian	Michael Badnarik; Richard Campagna	2,382	0.31%	−0.03
Green	David Cobb; Pat LaMarche	1,226	0.16%	−3.39
Constitution	Michael Peroutka; Chuck Baldwin	771	0.10%	+0.04
Total votes		756,304	100.00%	
Republican win				

=== By county ===
County	George W. Bush Republican		John Kerry Democratic		Various candidates Other parties		Margin		Total votes cast
County	#	%	#	%	#	%	#	%	Total votes cast
Bernalillo	121,454	47.29%	132,252	51.50%	3,105	1.21%	-10,798	-4.21%	256,811
Catron	1,427	71.60%	551	27.65%	15	0.75%	876	43.95%	1,993
Chaves	14,773	68.06%	6,726	30.99%	206	0.95%	8,047	37.07%	21,705
Cibola	3,477	46.44%	3,913	52.26%	97	1.29%	-436	-5.82%	7,487
Colfax	3,082	51.64%	2,824	47.32%	62	1.04%	258	4.32%	5,968
Curry	10,649	74.54%	3,541	24.79%	96	0.67%	7,108	49.75%	14,286
De Baca	706	71.10%	281	28.30%	6	0.60%	425	42.80%	993
Doña Ana	29,548	47.69%	31,762	51.26%	650	1.05%	-2,214	-3.57%	61,960
Eddy	13,268	65.46%	6,880	33.94%	122	0.61%	6,388	31.52%	20,270
Grant	6,135	45.81%	7,095	52.98%	162	1.20%	-960	-7.17%	13,392
Guadalupe	914	40.32%	1,340	59.11%	13	0.58%	-426	-18.79%	2,267
Harding	380	59.01%	259	40.22%	5	0.78%	121	18.79%	644
Hidalgo	1,081	55.04%	861	43.84%	22	1.11%	220	11.20%	1,964
Lea	14,430	79.37%	3,646	20.05%	105	0.58%	10,784	59.32%	18,181
Lincoln	6,070	67.34%	2,822	31.31%	122	1.36%	3,248	36.03%	9,014
Los Alamos	5,810	51.89%	5,206	46.49%	181	1.61%	604	5.40%	11,197
Luna	4,164	54.84%	3,340	43.99%	89	1.17%	824	10.85%	7,593
McKinley	7,351	35.64%	13,051	63.28%	221	1.07%	-5,700	-27.64%	20,623
Mora	928	32.84%	1,876	66.38%	22	0.78%	-948	-33.54%	2,826
Otero	14,066	67.74%	6,433	30.98%	265	1.28%	7,633	36.76%	20,754
Quay	2,661	64.63%	1,422	34.54%	34	0.83%	1,239	30.09%	4,117
Rio Arriba	5,149	34.33%	9,753	65.02%	97	0.65%	-4,604	-30.69%	14,999
Roosevelt	4,997	69.95%	2,082	29.14%	65	0.91%	2,915	40.81%	7,144
San Juan	29,525	65.60%	14,843	32.98%	638	1.42%	14,682	32.62%	45,006
San Miguel	3,313	27.34%	8,683	71.67%	120	0.99%	-5,370	-44.33%	12,116
Sandoval	22,628	50.80%	21,421	48.09%	492	1.11%	1,207	2.71%	44,541
Santa Fe	18,466	27.89%	47,074	71.11%	660	1.00%	-28,608	-43.22%	66,200
Sierra	3,162	61.31%	1,926	37.35%	69	1.33%	1,236	23.96%	5,157
Socorro	3,696	47.08%	4,025	51.27%	130	1.66%	-329	-4.19%	7,851
Taos	3,666	24.71%	10,987	74.06%	182	1.22%	-7,321	-49.35%	14,835
Torrance	4,026	61.87%	2,386	36.67%	95	1.46%	1,640	25.20%	6,507
Union	1,454	77.30%	411	21.85%	16	0.85%	1,043	55.45%	1,881
Valencia	14,474	55.64%	11,270	43.33%	268	1.03%	3,204	12.31%	26,012
Total	376,930	49.84%	370,942	49.05%	8,432	1.11%	5,988	0.79%	756,304

==== Counties that flipped from Democratic to Republican ====
- Colfax (largest municipality: Raton)

=== By congressional district ===
Despite losing the state, Kerry won two of three congressional districts including one district won by a Republican.

District	Bush	Kerry	Representative
1st	48%	51%	Heather Wilson
2nd	58%	41%	Steve Pearce
3rd	45%	54%	Tom Udall

== Electors ==
New Mexico voters cast their ballots for electors: representatives to the Electoral College. New Mexico has 5 electors because it has 3 congressional districts and 2 senators. All candidates who appear on the ballot or qualify to receive write-in votes must submit a list of 5 electors, who pledge to vote for their candidate and his or her running mate. Whoever wins the majority of votes in the state is awarded all 5 electoral votes. Their chosen electors then vote for president and vice president. Although electors are pledged to their candidate and running mate, they are not obligated to vote for them. An elector who votes for someone other than his or her candidate is known as a faithless elector.

The electors of each state and the District of Columbia met on December 13, 2004, to cast their votes for president and vice president. The Electoral College itself never meets as one body. Instead the electors from each state and the District of Columbia meet in their respective capitols.

The following were the members of the Electoral College from the state. All were pledged to and voted for Bush/Cheney.

1. Rod Adair
2. Ruth Kelly
3. Rick Lopez
4. Lou Melvin
5. Rodney Montoya
