= Solano, New Mexico =

Unincorporated community in New Mexico, United States

- Unincorporated community
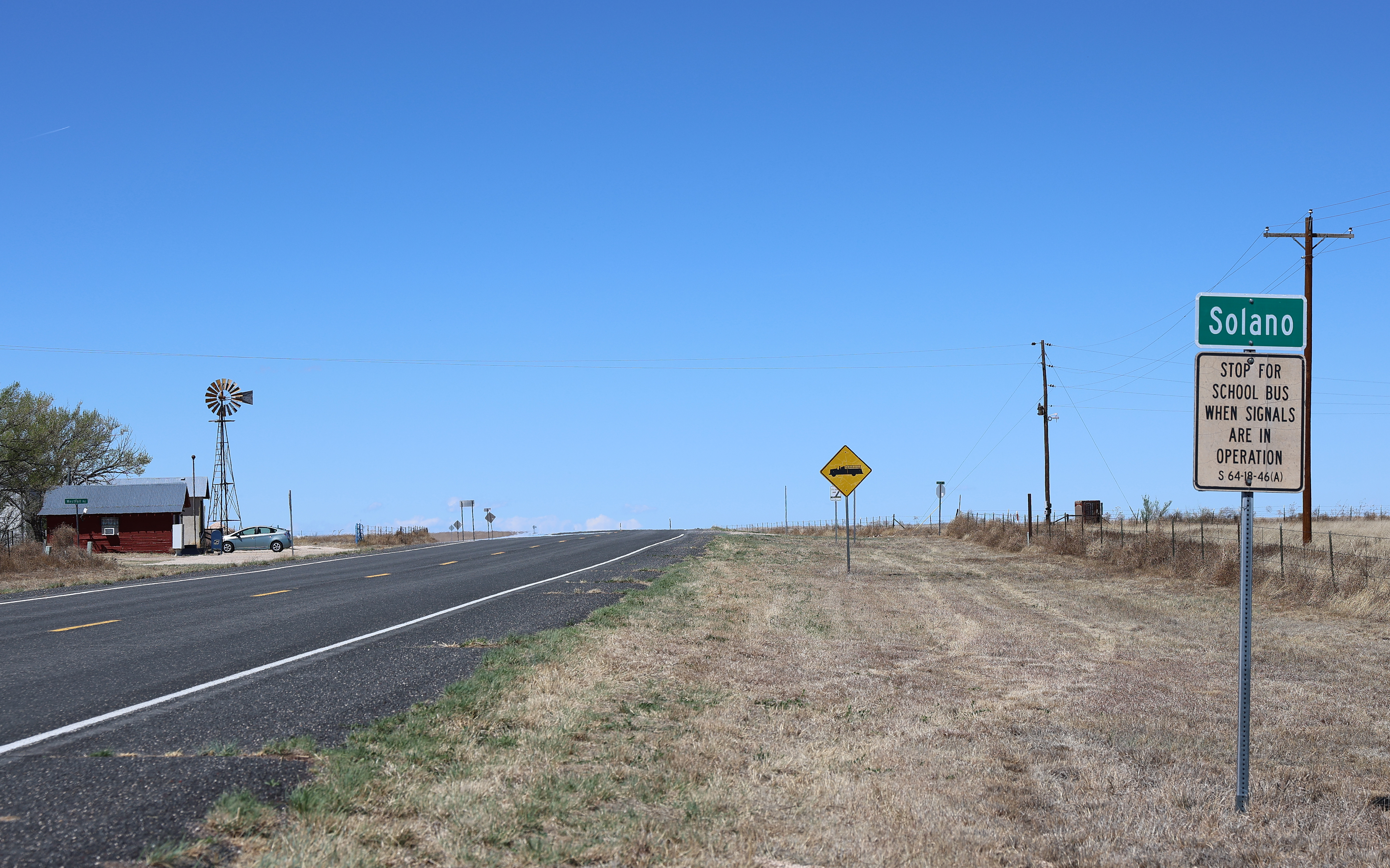
- Solano in 2026

- Location within the state of New Mexico Solano (the United States)
- Coordinates: 35°50′59″N 104°04′07″W
- Country: United States
- State: New Mexico
- County: Harding
- Elevation: 5,627 ft (1,715 m)
- Time zone: UTC-7 (Mountain (MST))
  - Summer (DST): UTC-6 (MDT)
- ZIP codes: 87746
- Area code: 575
- GNIS feature ID: 894990

Solano is an unincorporated community in Harding County, New Mexico, United States, founded in 1907. It lies along NM 39 and the tracks of a spur of the Southern Pacific Railroad about half-way between Roy and Mosquero. The post office was opened in 1907.

== History ==
Solano began in 1907 when F. M. Hughes built his house and a store. It was named after a local mail carrier, Cipriano Solano. Solano was the largest town in Harding County for a time, and even published a local newspaper, The Solano Herald, but when the coal mines in Dawson shut down in the 1950s, its importance waned.
