= New Mexico State Road 419 =

State highway in New Mexico, United States

State Road 419

Route information
- Maintained by NMDOT
- Length: 48.752 mi (78.459 km)

Major junctions
- South end: NM 104 near Variadero
- North end: NM 39 near Mosquero

Location
- Country: United States
- State: New Mexico
- Counties: Harding, San Miguel

Highway system
- New Mexico State Highway System; Interstate; US; State; Scenic
← NM 418	→ NM 420

State Road 419 (NM 419) is a state highway in the US state of New Mexico. Its total length is approximately 48.75 miles (78.46 km). NM 419's southern terminus is at NM 104 north of Variadero, and the northern terminus is at NM 39 north of Mosquero.

== Major intersections ==
County	Location	mi	km	Destinations	Notes
San Miguel		0.000	0.000	NM 104 – Las Vegas, Tucumcari	Southern terminus
Harding		48.752	78.459	NM 39 – Mosquero, Roy	Northern terminus
1.000 mi = 1.609 km; 1.000 km = 0.621 mi
