= New Mexico State Road 104 =

State highway in San Miguel and Quay counties in New Mexico, United States

State Road 104

Route information
- Maintained by NMDOT
- Length: 106.897 mi (172.034 km)

Major junctions
- West end: I-25 BL in Las Vegas
- I-25 in Las Vegas; NM 419 in Tremetina; NM 129 near Conchas
- East end: I-40 BL / NM 209 in Tucumcari

Location
- Country: United States
- State: New Mexico
- Counties: San Miguel, Quay

Highway system
- New Mexico State Highway System; Interstate; US; State; Scenic
← NM 103	→ NM 105

New Mexico State Road 104 (also termed State Highway 104 or NM 104) is a 106.9-mile-long (172.0 km) state highway in the U.S. state of New Mexico. The route travels through San Miguel and Quay counties, and through the communities of Las Vegas, Alta Vista, Trementina, Garita, and Tucumcari.

== Major intersections ==
County	Location	mi	km	Destinations	Notes
San Miguel	Las Vegas	0.000	0.000	I-25 BL (Grand Avenue) to NM 65 / NM 518	Western terminus; road continues as University Avenue
San Miguel	Las Vegas	0.330	0.531	I-25 (US 85)	Exit 345 on I-25
San Miguel		1.570	2.527	NM 281 south – Las Vegas National Wildlife Refuge	Northern terminus of NM 281
San Miguel	Trementina	46.334	74.567	NM 419 north – Mosquero	Southern terminus of NM 419
San Miguel	Mesa Rica	69.551	111.931	NM 129 south to I-40	Northern terminus of NM 129
San Miguel		74.590	120.041	NM 432 north – Big Mesa	Southern terminus of NM 432
San Miguel		75.670	121.779	NM 433 north (Bellranch Road) – Conchas Dam	Southern terminus of NM 433
Quay	Tucumcari	106.393	171.223	Bus. Loop US 54 / NM 237 (Main Street) – Dalhart, Santa Rosa	
Quay	Tucumcari	106.897	172.034	Historic US 66 (I-40 BL) / NM 209 south (First Street south)	Southern terminus; northern terminus of NM 209; road continues as NM 209 (First St.) towards Dr. Dan C. Trigg Memorial Hospital
1.000 mi = 1.609 km; 1.000 km = 0.621 mi: Route transition

== See also ==
- List of state roads in New Mexico
