= Harding County, New Mexico =

County in New Mexico, United States

- County
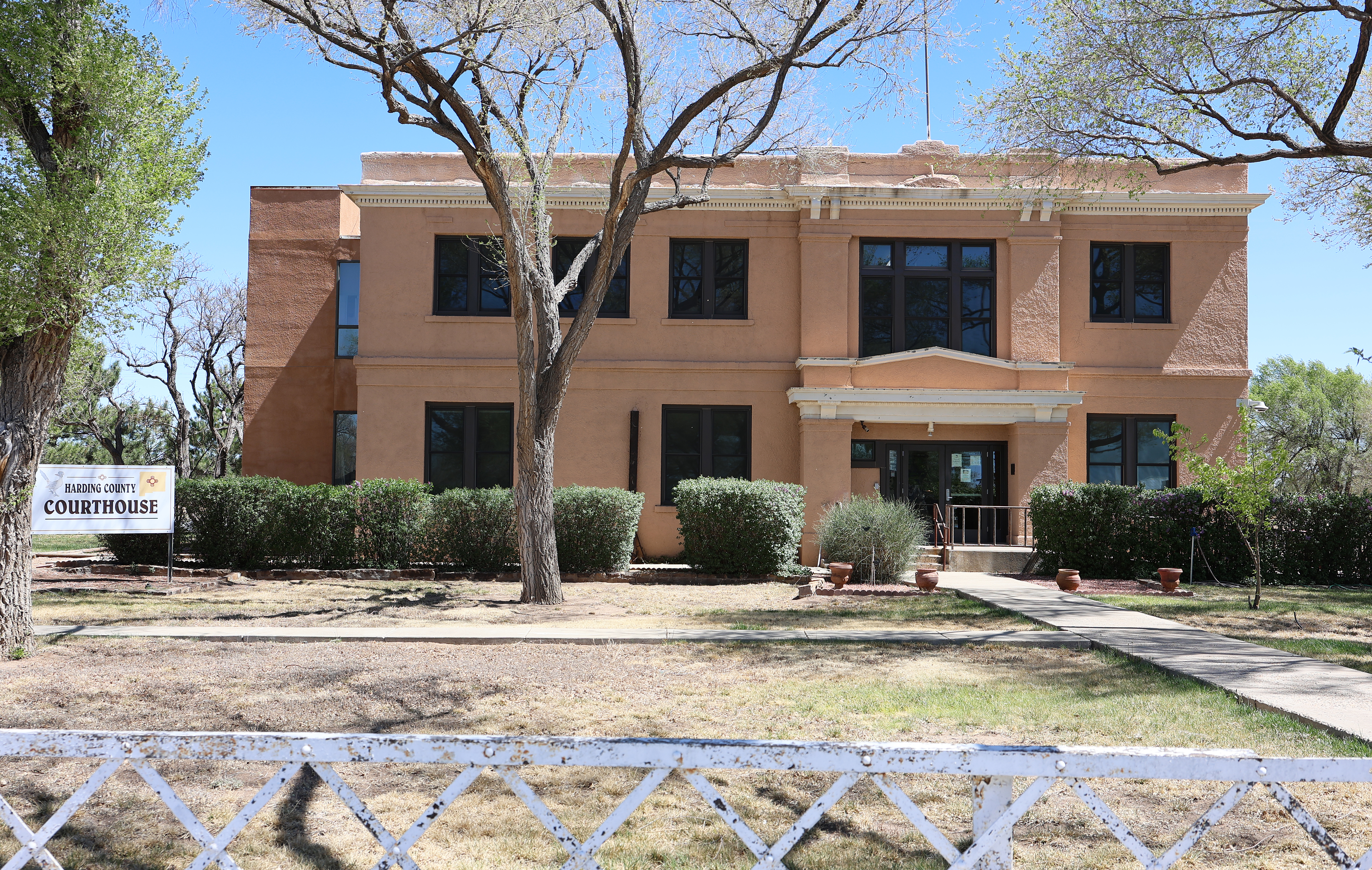
- The Harding County Courthouse (2026)

- Location within the U.S. state of New Mexico
- Coordinates: 35°52′N 103°49′W
- Country: United States
- State: New Mexico
- Founded: March 4, 1921
- Named for: Warren G. Harding
- Seat: Mosquero
- Largest village: Roy

Area
  - Total: 2,126 sq mi (5,510 km^{2})
  - Land: 2,125 sq mi (5,500 km^{2})
  - Water: 0.4 sq mi (1.0 km^{2}) 0.02%

Population (2020)
  - Total: 657
  - Estimate (2025): 617 ▼
  - Density: 0.309/sq mi (0.119/km^{2})
- Time zone: UTC−7 (Mountain)
  - Summer (DST): UTC−6 (MDT)
- Congressional district: 3rd
- Website: www.hardingcounty.org

Harding County is a county in the U.S. state of New Mexico. As of the 2020 census, the population was 657, making it the least populous county in the state, and the 13th-smallest county by population in the United States. Its county seat is Mosquero. The county is named for United States President Warren G. Harding, and was created (from parts of Union and Mora Counties) on the day of his inauguration as president on March 4, 1921, making him the most recent president to have a county in any state named after him.

The only incorporated cities in Harding County are Roy and Mosquero.

== Geography ==
According to the U.S. Census Bureau, the county has a total area of 2,126 square miles (5,510 km^{2}), of which 2,125 square miles (5,500 km^{2}) is land and 0.4 square miles (1.0 km^{2}) (0.02%) is water. It is divided between a high, nearly treeless prairie to the northwest (the southern limit of the High Plains), and a lower semi-desert rangeland to the southeast, by the eastern portion of the steep Canadian Escarpment. The Canadian River, in a deep and narrow canyon, forms the western border with Mora County; the southwest border runs along the edge of the Bell Ranch land in San Miguel County. The eastern part of Harding County is underlain in part by the Bravo Dome carbon dioxide gas field, which is commercially extracted.

=== Adjacent counties ===
- Union County – northeast
- Quay County – southeast
- San Miguel County – south
- Mora County – west
- Colfax County – northwest

=== National protected area ===
- Kiowa National Grassland (part)

== Demographics ==
Historical population
Census	Pop.	Note	%±
1930	4,421		—
1940	4,374		−1.1%
1950	3,013		−31.1%
1960	1,874		−37.8%
1970	1,348		−28.1%
1980	1,090		−19.1%
1990	987		−9.4%
2000	810		−17.9%
2010	695		−14.2%
2020	657		−5.5%
2025 (est.)	617	▼	−6.1%
U.S. Decennial Census; 1790-1960 1900-1990; 1990-2000 2010

=== 2020 census ===
As of the 2020 census, the county had a population of 657. The median age was 58.4 years. 14.6% of residents were under the age of 18 and 38.2% of residents were 65 years of age or older. For every 100 females there were 99.1 males, and for every 100 females age 18 and over there were 103.3 males age 18 and over.

Harding County, New Mexico – Racial and ethnic composition Note: the US Census treats Hispanic/Latino as an ethnic category. This table excludes Latinos from the racial categories and assigns them to a separate category. Hispanics/Latinos may be of any race.
Race / Ethnicity (NH = Non-Hispanic)	Pop 2000	Pop 2010	Pop 2020	% 2000	% 2010	% 2020
White alone (NH)	428	391	352	52.84%	56.26%	53.58%
Black or African American alone (NH)	3	2	2	0.37%	0.29%	0.30%
Native American or Alaska Native alone (NH)	4	2	0	0.49%	0.29%	0.00%
Asian alone (NH)	0	0	0	0.00%	0.00%	0.00%
Pacific Islander alone (NH)	0	0	0	0.00%	0.00%	0.00%
Other race alone (NH)	0	0	1	0.00%	0.00%	0.15%
Mixed race or Multiracial (NH)	11	1	20	1.36%	0.14%	3.04%
Hispanic or Latino (any race)	364	299	282	44.94%	43.02%	42.92%
Total	810	695	657	100.00%	100.00%	100.00%

The racial makeup of the county was 65.1% White, 0.6% Black or African American, 1.1% American Indian and Alaska Native, 0.0% Asian, 0.0% Native Hawaiian and Pacific Islander, 7.0% from some other race, and 26.2% from two or more races. Hispanic or Latino residents of any race comprised 42.9% of the population.

0.0% of residents lived in urban areas, while 100.0% lived in rural areas.

There were 331 households in the county, of which 21.8% had children under the age of 18 living with them and 21.5% had a female householder with no spouse or partner present. About 30.8% of all households were made up of individuals and 15.1% had someone living alone who was 65 years of age or older.

There were 600 housing units, of which 44.8% were vacant. Among occupied housing units, 79.5% were owner-occupied and 20.5% were renter-occupied. The homeowner vacancy rate was 0.7% and the rental vacancy rate was 16.0%.

=== 2010 census ===
As of the 2010 census, there were 695 people, 349 households, and 213 families living in the county. The population density was 0.3 inhabitants per square mile (0.12 inhabitants/km^{2}). There were 526 housing units at an average density of 0.2 units per square mile (0.077 units/km^{2}). The racial makeup of the county was 86.9% white, 1.2% American Indian, 0.3% black or African American, 10.2% from other races, and 1.4% from two or more races. Those of Hispanic or Latino origin made up 43.0% of the population. In terms of ancestry, 11.0% were German, and 2.2% were American.

Of the 349 households, 15.5% had children under the age of 18 living with them, 51.3% were married couples living together, 5.4% had a female householder with no husband present, 39.0% were non-families, and 34.7% of all households were made up of individuals. The average household size was 1.99 and the average family size was 2.49. The median age was 55.9 years.

The median income for a household in the county was $33,750 and the median income for a family was $56,563. Males had a median income of $36,167 versus $29,111 for females. The per capita income for the county was $14,684. About 9.1% of families and 19.1% of the population were below the poverty line, including 11.6% of those under age 18 and 24.7% of those age 65 or over.

=== 2000 census ===
As of the 2000 census, there were 810 people, 371 households, and 231 families living in the county. The population density was 0.38 people per square mile (0.15 people/km^{2}). There were 545 housing units at an average density of 0.26 units per square mile (0.10/km^{2}). The racial makeup of the county was 84.32% White, 0.37% Black or African American, 1.36% Native American, 10.62% from other races, and 3.33% from two or more races. 44.94% of the population were Hispanic or Latino of any race.

There were 371 households, out of which 22.10% had children under the age of 18 living with them, 52.60% were married couples living together, 7.50% had a female householder with no husband present, and 37.50% were non-families. 35.30% of all households were made up of individuals, and 21.00% had someone living alone who was 65 years of age or older. The average household size was 2.18 and the average family size was 2.84.

In the county, the population was spread out, with 20.20% under the age of 18, 4.60% from 18 to 24, 18.80% from 25 to 44, 28.10% from 45 to 64, and 28.30% who were 65 years of age or older. The median age was 49 years. For every 100 females there were 102.50 males. For every 100 females age 18 and over, there were 102.50 males.

The median income for a household in the county was $26,111, and the median income for a family was $36,667. Males had a median income of $22,750 versus $15,750 for females. The per capita income for the county was $16,240. About 12.90% of families and 16.30% of the population were below the poverty line, including 31.30% of those under age 18 and 11.30% of those age 65 or over.

== Communities ==
=== Villages ===
- Mosquero (county seat)
- Roy

=== Unincorporated communities ===
- Bueyeros
- Mills
- Solano

== Politics ==
Harding County is conservative in presidential elections. It last supported a Democrat for president in 1948, and that was by a margin of just 4 votes.

United States presidential election results for Harding County, New Mexico
Year	Republican		Democratic		Third party(ies)	
Year	No.	%	No.	%	No.	%
1924	721	42.14%	714	41.73%	276	16.13%
1928	916	55.72%	726	44.16%	2	0.12%
1932	779	33.97%	1,478	64.46%	36	1.57%
1936	888	40.94%	1,276	58.83%	5	0.23%
1940	998	49.63%	1,004	49.93%	9	0.45%
1944	820	55.90%	647	44.10%	0	0.00%
1948	649	49.66%	653	49.96%	5	0.38%
1952	760	63.49%	436	36.42%	1	0.08%
1956	671	61.96%	412	38.04%	0	0.00%
1960	616	60.87%	396	39.13%	0	0.00%
1964	473	52.27%	431	47.62%	1	0.11%
1968	450	57.69%	284	36.41%	46	5.90%
1972	522	68.68%	220	28.95%	18	2.37%
1976	387	57.08%	285	42.04%	6	0.88%
1980	356	59.23%	225	37.44%	20	3.33%
1984	401	63.55%	224	35.50%	6	0.95%
1988	377	56.10%	291	43.30%	4	0.60%
1992	312	46.02%	268	39.53%	98	14.45%
1996	321	52.11%	264	42.86%	31	5.03%
2000	366	61.72%	214	36.09%	13	2.19%
2004	380	59.01%	259	40.22%	5	0.78%
2008	358	57.19%	260	41.53%	8	1.28%
2012	327	54.41%	260	43.26%	14	2.33%
2016	311	59.01%	156	29.60%	60	11.39%
2020	319	63.17%	179	35.45%	7	1.39%
2024	297	68.91%	128	29.70%	6	1.39%

== Transportation ==
=== Major highways ===
- NM 39
- NM 102
- NM 120
- NM 419
- NM 420

== See also ==
- National Register of Historic Places listings in Harding County, New Mexico
