= 1932 United States presidential election in New Mexico =

- November 8, 1932

Nominee	Franklin D. Roosevelt	Herbert Hoover
Party	Democratic	Republican
Home state	New York	California
Running mate	John N. Garner	Charles Curtis
Electoral vote	3	0
Popular vote	95,089	54,217
Percentage	62.72%	35.76%
County results
Roosevelt
50–60%
60–70%
70–80%
80–90%
Hoover
50–60%
President before election
Herbert Hoover
Republican
Elected President
Franklin D. Roosevelt
Democratic

The 1932 United States presidential election in New Mexico took place on November 8, 1932. All contemporary forty-eight states were part of the 1932 United States presidential election. State voters chose three electors to represent them in the Electoral College, which voted for President and Vice President.

New Mexico was won by New York Governor Franklin D. Roosevelt in a 27-point landslide against incumbent president Herbert Hoover, who failed to gain reelection. He won every county save Valencia and San Miguel. As of 2024, this remains the best presidential performance in New Mexico history.

Roosevelt was the first Democrat to ever win Doña Ana County, Rio Arriba County, Santa Fe County, Taos County, and Torrance County. Roosevelt failed to flip San Miguel County and Valencia County (the latter being by far the most Republican county in the state at the time), though his share of the vote in each county was the highest ever achieved by a Democrat to that point. Roosevelt would ultimately flip both counties in the following election.

== Results ==
General Election Results
Party	Pledged to	Elector	Votes
Democratic Party	Franklin D. Roosevelt	Carl A. Hatch	95,089
Democratic Party	Franklin D. Roosevelt	Enrique Trujillo	94,220
Democratic Party	Franklin D. Roosevelt	Mrs. J. L. La Driere	94,188
Republican Party	Herbert Hoover	Mrs. Luis E. Armijo	54,217
Republican Party	Herbert Hoover	George E. Breece	54,146
Republican Party	Herbert Hoover	Mrs. E. A. Cahoon	53,964
Socialist Party	Norman Thomas	J. H. Johnson	1,776
Socialist Party	Norman Thomas	Bert McNutt	1,771
Socialist Party	Norman Thomas	R. L. Darr	1,766
Liberty Party	William Hope Harvey	Mrs. P. M. Reed	389
Liberty Party	William Hope Harvey	A. M. Smoak	386
Liberty Party	William Hope Harvey	J. S. Reynolds	378
Communist Party	William Z. Foster	H. Whitlock	135
Communist Party	William Z. Foster	Joe Hutchinson	133
Communist Party	William Z. Foster	J. W. Blackburn	132
Votes cast (Note: Based on totals for highest elector on each ticket)			151,606

=== Results by county ===
County	Franklin D. Roosevelt Democratic		Herbert Hoover Republican		Norman Thomas Socialist		William Hope Harvey Liberty		William Z. Foster Communist		Margin		Total votes cast (Note: Based on the highest elector on each ticket)
County	#	%	#	%	#	%	#	%	#	%	#	%	Total votes cast
Bernalillo	10,722	58.77%	7,309	40.06%	181	0.99%	6	0.03%	25	0.14%	3,413	18.71%	18,243
Catron	972	60.45%	610	37.94%	20	1.24%	1	0.06%	5	0.31%	362	22.51%	1,608
Chaves	4,257	67.34%	1,830	28.95%	51	0.81%	159	2.52%	25	0.40%	2,427	38.39%	6,322
Colfax	4,282	56.74%	3,214	42.59%	47	0.62%	3	0.04%	1	0.01%	1,068	14.15%	7,547
Curry	3,738	73.60%	932	18.35%	401	7.90%	1	0.02%	7	0.14%	2,806	55.25%	5,079
De Baca	1,023	78.39%	264	20.23%	13	1.00%	2	0.15%	3	0.23%	759	58.16%	1,305
Doña Ana	5,133	67.58%	2,354	30.99%	104	1.37%	4	0.05%	0	0.00%	2,779	36.59%	7,595
Eddy	3,565	79.95%	818	18.34%	69	1.55%	6	0.13%	1	0.02%	2,747	61.61%	4,459
Grant	3,344	69.74%	1,381	28.80%	45	0.94%	0	0.00%	25	0.52%	1,963	40.94%	4,795
Guadalupe	1,909	53.90%	1,621	45.77%	12	0.34%	0	0.00%	0	0.00%	288	8.13%	3,542
Harding	1,478	64.46%	779	33.97%	36	1.57%	0	0.00%	0	0.00%	699	30.48%	2,293
Hidalgo	1,131	77.47%	299	20.48%	28	1.92%	2	0.14%	0	0.00%	832	56.99%	1,460
Lea	2,371	86.03%	271	9.83%	87	3.16%	27	0.98%	0	0.00%	2,100	76.20%	2,756
Lincoln	2,225	65.10%	1,172	34.29%	15	0.44%	5	0.15%	1	0.03%	1,053	30.81%	3,418
Luna	1,605	70.21%	641	28.04%	36	1.57%	0	0.00%	4	0.17%	964	42.17%	2,286
McKinley	2,096	60.07%	1,373	39.35%	14	0.40%	0	0.00%	6	0.17%	723	20.72%	3,489
Mora	2,962	67.21%	1,444	32.77%	0	0.00%	0	0.00%	1	0.02%	1,518	34.45%	4,407
Otero	2,091	66.87%	969	30.99%	67	2.14%	0	0.00%	0	0.00%	1,122	35.88%	3,127
Quay	3,058	75.01%	852	20.90%	164	4.02%	1	0.02%	2	0.05%	2,206	54.11%	4,077
Rio Arriba	5,337	64.86%	2,880	35.00%	5	0.06%	0	0.00%	7	0.09%	2,457	29.86%	8,229
Roosevelt	2,826	83.02%	475	13.95%	93	2.73%	5	0.15%	5	0.15%	2,351	69.07%	3,404
San Juan	1,506	57.15%	925	35.10%	50	1.90%	150	5.69%	4	0.15%	581	22.05%	2,635
San Miguel	5,076	48.53%	5,364	51.28%	14	0.13%	0	0.00%	6	0.06%	-288	-2.75%	10,460
Sandoval	1,808	53.52%	1,562	46.24%	7	0.21%	0	0.00%	1	0.03%	246	7.28%	3,378
Santa Fe	5,739	61.12%	3,625	38.60%	26	0.28%	0	0.00%	0	0.00%	2,114	22.51%	9,390
Sierra	1,515	68.55%	667	30.18%	27	1.22%	1	0.05%	0	0.00%	848	38.37%	2,210
Socorro	2,495	56.22%	1,931	43.51%	11	0.25%	0	0.00%	1	0.02%	564	12.71%	4,438
Taos	3,277	57.26%	2,416	42.22%	29	0.51%	0	0.00%	1	0.02%	861	15.04%	5,723
Torrance	2,202	54.09%	1,803	44.29%	63	1.55%	2	0.05%	1	0.02%	399	9.80%	4,071
Union	3,117	71.61%	1,173	26.95%	50	1.15%	11	0.25%	2	0.05%	1,944	44.66%	4,353
Valencia	2,229	40.48%	3,263	59.25%	11	0.20%	3	0.05%	1	0.02%	-1,034	-18.78%	5,507
Total	95,089	62.72%	54,217	35.76%	1,776	1.17%	389	0.26%	135	0.09%	40,872	26.96%	151,606

==== Counties that flipped from Republican to Democratic ====
- Bernalillo
- Catron
- Chaves
- Colfax
- Curry
- Doña Ana
- Eddy
- Grant
- Guadalupe
- Harding
- Hidalgo
- Lea
- Lincoln
- Luna
- McKinley
- Mora
- Otero
- Quay
- Rio Arriba
- Roosevelt
- San Juan
- Sandoval
- Santa Fe
- Sierra
- Socorro
- Taos
- Torrance
- Union
