= 1972 United States presidential election in New Mexico =

- November 7, 1972

Nominee	Richard Nixon	George McGovern
Party	Republican	Democratic
Home state	California	South Dakota
Running mate	Spiro Agnew	Sargent Shriver
Electoral vote	4	0
Popular vote	235,606	141,084
Percentage	61.05%	36.56%
County results
Nixon
40–50%
50–60%
60–70%
70–80%
McGovern
50–60%
President before election
Richard Nixon
Republican
Elected President
Richard Nixon
Republican

The 1972 United States presidential election in New Mexico took place on November 7, 1972. This was the fifteenth Presidential Election which New Mexico participated in. All fifty states plus the District of Columbia, were part of this presidential election. State voters chose four electors to represent them in the Electoral College, who voted for the President and Vice President. South Dakota Senator George McGovern was nominated to run against Nixon, and was defeated in one of the most lopsided elections in United States history. McGovern lost every state except Massachusetts to Nixon.

New Mexico was won by President Richard Nixon by a 24-point landslide, mirroring the national popular vote margin by a near-perfect amount and making New Mexico 1.3% more Republican than the nation-at-large. McGovern won only two counties: he comfortably won Rio Arriba County by 12.6 percentage points, and also won San Miguel County by 2.5 percentage points. Nixon was the first Republican to carry Grant County since 1928.

The 1972 election remains the last when Santa Fe, Taos or Mora counties provided a Republican majority or plurality, and Nixon won Mora County by a mere thirty votes. At the other extreme, solidly Republican Lea County in the Plains region was won by Nixon by 55.4 percent, and Lincoln County, which had not voted Democrat since Franklin D. Roosevelt's 1936 landslide, by 55.9 percent. As of 2024, this was the best performance for a Republican presidential nominee in New Mexico.

== Primaries ==
=== Democratic ===
1972 New Mexico Democratic Party presidential primary
- June 6, 1972

Candidate	George McGovern	George Wallace	Hubert Humphrey
Home state	South Dakota	Alabama	Minnesota
Popular vote	51,011	44,843	39,768
Percentage	33.28%	29.25%	25.94%
County Results
McGovern
30-40%
40-50%
50-60%
Wallace
30-40%
40-50%
50-60%

George McGovern would defeat Alabama Governor, George Wallace, and previous Democratic nominee, Hubert Humphrey.

DemocraticPrimary – June 6, 1972
Party	Candidate	Votes	%
Democratic	George McGovern	51,011	33.28%
Democratic	George Wallace	44,843	29.25%
Democratic	Hubert Humphrey	39,768	25.94%
Democratic	Edmund Muskie	6,411	4.18%
Democratic	Henry M. Jackson	4,236	2.76%
Democratic	Uncommitted	3,819	2.49%
Democratic	Shirley Chisholm	3,205	2.09%
Total votes		153,293	100

== Results ==
1972 United States presidential election in New Mexico
Party	Candidate	Votes	%	±%
Republican	Richard Nixon (incumbent); Spiro Agnew (incumbent)	235,606	61.05%	+9.20
Democratic	George McGovern; Sargent Shriver	141,084	36.56%	−3.19
American Independent	John G. Schmitz; Thomas J. Anderson	8,767	2.27%	−5.59
Socialist Workers	Linda Jenness; Andrew Pulley	474	0.12%	+0.04
Total votes		385,931	100.00%	
Republican win				

=== Results by county ===
County	Richard Nixon Republican		George McGovern Democratic		John G. Schmitz American Independent		Linda Jenness Socialist Workers		Margin		Total votes cast
County	#	%	#	%	#	%	#	%	#	%	Total votes cast
Bernalillo	79,993	60.80%	48,753	37.06%	2,651	2.02%	165	0.13%	31,240	23.74%	131,562
Catron	829	73.49%	271	24.02%	26	2.30%	2	0.18%	558	49.47%	1,128
Chaves	11,493	70.87%	4,296	26.49%	415	2.56%	12	0.07%	7,197	44.38%	16,216
Colfax	2,663	57.88%	1,855	40.32%	82	1.78%	1	0.02%	808	17.56%	4,601
Curry	8,392	75.85%	2,416	21.84%	246	2.22%	10	0.09%	5,976	54.01%	11,064
De Baca	752	71.82%	270	25.79%	24	2.29%	1	0.10%	482	46.03%	1,047
Dona Ana	14,562	59.76%	9,416	38.64%	367	1.51%	21	0.09%	5,146	21.12%	24,366
Eddy	9,921	64.65%	5,040	32.84%	368	2.40%	17	0.11%	4,881	31.81%	15,346
Grant	4,431	50.46%	4,081	46.48%	262	2.98%	7	0.08%	350	3.98%	8,781
Guadalupe	1,297	51.37%	1,202	47.60%	23	0.91%	3	0.12%	95	3.77%	2,525
Harding	522	68.68%	220	28.95%	18	2.37%	0	0.00%	302	39.73%	760
Hidalgo	1,051	63.43%	562	33.92%	44	2.65%	0	0.00%	489	29.51%	1,657
Lea	12,478	76.41%	3,429	21.00%	409	2.50%	15	0.09%	9,049	55.41%	16,331
Lincoln	2,528	77.07%	696	21.22%	52	1.59%	4	0.12%	1,832	55.85%	3,280
Los Alamos	5,039	66.09%	2,435	31.94%	138	1.81%	12	0.16%	2,604	34.15%	7,624
Luna	2,958	63.25%	1,560	33.35%	157	3.36%	2	0.04%	1,398	29.90%	4,677
McKinley	5,366	49.74%	5,124	47.49%	273	2.53%	26	0.24%	242	2.25%	10,789
Mora	1,165	50.26%	1,135	48.96%	15	0.65%	3	0.13%	30	1.30%	2,318
Otero	7,033	65.91%	2,981	27.94%	646	6.05%	10	0.09%	4,052	37.97%	10,670
Quay	3,224	71.30%	1,161	25.67%	133	2.94%	4	0.09%	2,063	45.63%	4,522
Rio Arriba	4,351	42.68%	5,642	55.34%	192	1.88%	10	0.10%	-1,291	-12.66%	10,195
Roosevelt	4,727	73.03%	1,612	24.90%	132	2.04%	2	0.03%	3,115	48.13%	6,473
San Juan	10,788	67.55%	4,296	26.90%	828	5.18%	58	0.36%	6,492	40.65%	15,970
San Miguel	4,434	47.71%	4,663	50.18%	175	1.88%	21	0.23%	-229	-2.47%	9,293
Sandoval	3,507	50.25%	3,293	47.18%	169	2.42%	10	0.14%	214	3.07%	6,979
Santa Fe	12,211	52.53%	10,761	46.29%	255	1.10%	19	0.08%	1,450	6.24%	23,246
Sierra	2,074	67.47%	934	30.38%	62	2.02%	4	0.13%	1,140	37.09%	3,074
Socorro	2,658	56.19%	1,994	42.16%	72	1.52%	6	0.13%	664	14.03%	4,730
Taos	3,617	50.49%	3,472	48.46%	65	0.91%	10	0.14%	145	2.03%	7,164
Torrance	1,758	64.54%	908	33.33%	56	2.06%	2	0.07%	850	31.21%	2,724
Union	1,545	72.50%	496	23.28%	87	4.08%	3	0.14%	1,049	49.22%	2,131
Valencia	8,239	56.09%	6,110	41.60%	325	2.21%	14	0.10%	2,129	14.49%	14,688
Totals	235,606	61.05%	141,084	36.56%	8,767	2.27%	474	0.12%	94,522	24.49%	385,931
