= Ilfeld, New Mexico =

Ilfeld
- Unincorporated community
- Location within the state of New Mexico Ilfeld (the United States)
- Coordinates: 35°25′16″N 105°33′32″W
- Country: United States
- State: New Mexico
- County: San Miguel
- Elevation: 6,532 ft (1,991 m)
- Time zone: UTC-7 (Mountain (MST))
  - Summer (DST): UTC-6 (MDT)
- ZIP codes: 87538
- Area code: 575
- GNIS feature ID: 915844

Ilfeld is an unincorporated community located in San Miguel County, New Mexico, United States. The community is located along Interstate 25's frontage road, 22.5 miles (36.2 km) southwest of Las Vegas. Ilfeld has a post office with ZIP code 87538.
