= Donald Enlow =

American scientist

Donald H. Enlow (January 22, 1927 – July 5, 2014) was an American scientist known for his contributions to the field of orthodontics, particularly through his research on growth and development, with a special focus on human facial structure.

== Life ==
He was born in Mosquero, New Mexico in 1927 to Martie and Donald C. Enlow. He married Martha McKnight in 1945. Enlow enlisted in Coast Guard during WWII. After returning from the war, he earned his bachelor's degree in 1949 and his master's degree from the University of Houston in 1951. He then earned his PhD in Vertebrate Morphology from Texas A&M University in 1955. He eventually became an assistant professor at West Texas State University. After that he worked as an anatomy professor in the University of Michigan School of Dentistry for 15 years. He eventually moved from Michigan to become the Chairman of Anatomy at West Virginia University School of Medicine. He was named the Thomas J. Hill Distinguished Professor of Physical Biology after he joined the Case Western Reserve University Orthodontic Department as its chair in 1977.

== Research ==
During his PhD years, Enlow started fossil field prospecting in the area of West Texas. On one of his expeditions, he came across an idea of making a "ground" thin section of a bone fragment that he picked up from the ground. At Texas A&M, Dr. Stanley John Olsen who was a vertebrate Paleontologist helped Enlow with his specimens. After finishing his dissertation, Enlow co-authored 3 papers titled "A Comparative Histological Study of Fossil and Recent Bone Tissues" in Texas Journal of Science with Dr. Brown. These papers were important because they helped established a field of research in which bone growth and the life history of an organism were articulated from a Paleohistology point of view. Enlow's focused his research during his career in how bone remodeling regulates growth of facial structure. He authored the book The Human Face in 1968 which focused on his research.

While at Michigan, Enlow shifted his research from bone histology to Craniofacial Growth and Development. He published numerous papers and a book titled Handbook of Facial Growth in 1975. After moving to Case Western, he wrote the book Essentials of Facial Growth with Dr. Mark Hans. A recent version of the book was published in 2008. Following are some of the principles that were developed based on Enlow's research.

- Enlow's Counterpart Principle - The growth of any cranial or facial structure relates to other 'counterparts' in face and cranial area. ex. Maxilla and Mandible, Middle Cranial Fossa and Mandibular Ramus
- Enlow's V Principle - The movement happens at the wide end of the V during growth as a result of deposition of bone inside and resorption outside.

== Career ==
Over his lifetime, Enlow amassed over 100,000 slides of bone specimen that were useful in bone morphology and histology. Before his death, he gave the collection as a gift to Hard Tissue Research Unit at New York University College of Dentistry. The bone specimens in these slides come from a wide range of vertebrate groups, including fish and mammals.

In his honor, New York University held "Donald H. Enlow International Research Symposium: An Integrative Approach to Skeletal Biology in 2006 to commemorate 50th anniversary of Enlow's first published paper in Texas Journal of Science. He retired in 1992 after 15 years of service at Case Western University.

Enlow was diagnosed with Myasthenia gravis and he later died at the age of 84 in Wisconsin.

== Positions held ==
- Case Western Reserve University School of Dental Medicine, Dean, 1984-1986
- Case Western Department of Orthodontics, Professor and chair, 1977-1989
- Physical Growth Program at University of Michigan's Center for Human Growth and Development, Director, 1957-1972
- West Virginia School of Medicine, Professor & Chairman of Anatomy, 1972-1977

== Awards ==
- Fellow in the Royal Society of Medicine
- Award of Special Merit by AAO
