= New Mexico State Road 39 =

State highway in New Mexico, United States

State Road 39

Route information
- Maintained by NMDOT
- Length: 93.712 mi (150.815 km)

Major junctions
- South end: US 54 in Logan
- NM 120 in Roy
- North end: US 56 / US 412 in Abbot

Location
- Country: United States
- State: New Mexico
- Counties: Colfax, Harding, San Miguel, Quay

Highway system
- New Mexico State Highway System; Interstate; US; State; Scenic
← NM 38	→ I-40

View from New Mexico State Road 39

State Road 39 (NM 39) is a state highway in the US state of New Mexico. Its total length is approximately 93.7 miles (150.8 km). NM 39's southern terminus is at U.S. Route 54 (US 54) in Logan, and the northern terminus is at US 56 and US 412 in Abbot.

== Major intersections ==
County	Location	mi	km	Destinations	Notes
Quay	Logan	0.000	0.000	US 54 – Tucumcari, Dalhart, TX	Southern terminus
Harding		39.605	63.738	NM 102 east – Bueyeros	Western terminus of NM 102
San Miguel	No major junctions				
Harding		53.200	85.617	NM 419 west – Trementina, Las Vegas	Eastern terminus of NM 419
Harding	Roy	67.707	108.964	NM 120 – Wagon Mound	
Colfax	Abbot	93.712	150.815	US 56 / US 412 – Springer, Clayton	Northern terminus
1.000 mi = 1.609 km; 1.000 km = 0.621 mi

== See also ==
- List of state roads in New Mexico
