= New Mexico State Road 281 =

State highway in New Mexico, United States

State Road 281
- NM 281 highlighted in red

Route information
- Maintained by NMDOT
- Length: 6.698 mi (10.779 km)

Major junctions
- South end: End of state maintenance near McAllister Lake
- North end: NM 104 near Las Vegas

Location
- Country: United States
- State: New Mexico
- Counties: San Miguel

Highway system
- New Mexico State Highway System; Interstate; US; State; Scenic
← NM 280	→ NM 282

State Road 281 (NM 281) is a 6.7-mile-long (10.8 km) state highway in the US state of New Mexico. NM 281's northern terminus is at NM 104 near Las Vegas, and the southern terminus is at the end of state maintenance by McAllister Lake.

== Major intersections ==
The entire route is in San Miguel County.

Location	mi	km	Destinations	Notes
Las Vegas	0.000	0.000	NM 104	Southern terminus
McAllister Lake	6.698	10.779	End of state maintenance	Northern terminus
1.000 mi = 1.609 km; 1.000 km = 0.621 mi
