= New Mexico State Road 105 =

State highway in New Mexico, United States

State Road 105
- NM 105 highlighted in red

Route information
- Maintained by NMDOT
- Length: 9.100 mi (14.645 km)

Major junctions
- South end: NM 94
- NM 276
- North end: End of state maintenance near Rociada

Location
- Country: United States
- State: New Mexico
- Counties: San Miguel, Mora

Highway system
- New Mexico State Highway System; Interstate; US; State; Scenic
← NM 104	→ NM 106

State Road 105 (NM 105) is a state highway in the US state of New Mexico. Its total length is approximately 9.1 miles (14.6 km). NM 105's southern terminus is at NM 94, and the northern terminus is north of Rociada at the end of state maintenance.

== Major intersections ==
County	Location	mi	km	Destinations	Notes
San Miguel		0.000	0.000	NM 94	Southern terminus
San Miguel		3.545	5.705	NM 276 west	Eastern terminus of NM 276
Mora	Rociada	9.100	14.645	End of state maintenance	Northern terminus
1.000 mi = 1.609 km; 1.000 km = 0.621 mi
