= Las Gorras Blancas =

Vigilante group in the American Southwest

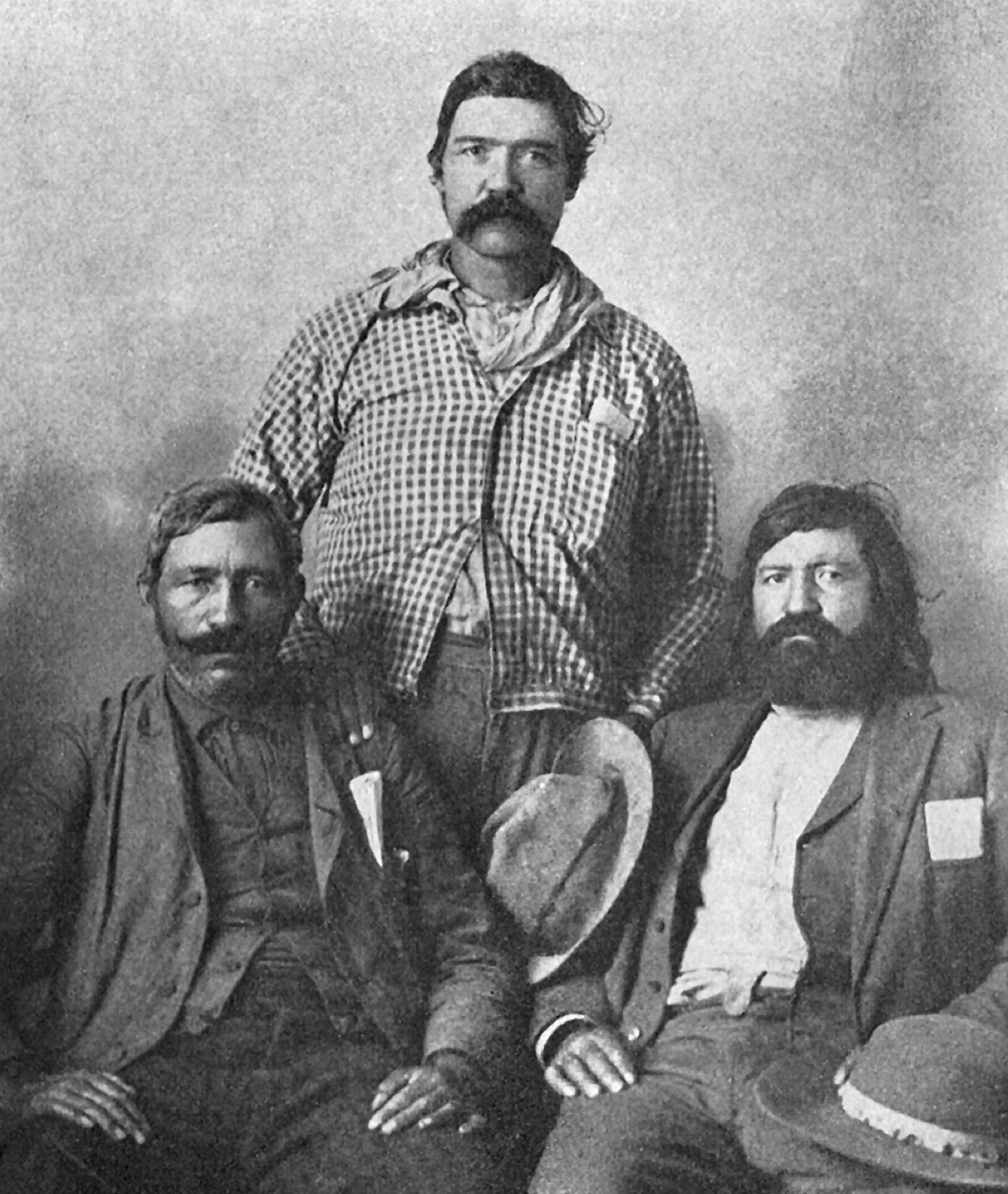
- Juan Jose, Pablo, and Nicanor Herrera (L to R), leaders of Las Gorras Blancas.
- Formation: 1889
- Dissolved: 1891
- Type: Vigilante group
- Location: San Miguel County, New Mexico Territory
- Region served: United States Southwest

Las Gorras Blancas (Spanish for "The White Caps") was a clandestine organization active in New Mexico Territory in the late 1880s and early 1890s. Often characterized as vigilantes and in response to the Santa Fe Ring of land speculators, ranchers, and homesteaders, mostly Anglo-Americans, Las Gorras Blancas protested the takeover of former common lands of Hispanic residents by acts of vandalism such as cutting fences and burning houses and barns. The night-riding members wore white caps to disguise themselves. The reputed founders and leaders were the three Herrera brothers: Juan Jose, Pablo, and Nicanor. The organization claimed to have 1,500 members.

Las Gorras Blancas were popular among the residents, mostly Hispanic, of Las Vegas and San Miguel County. Attempts to prosecute alleged members were unsuccessful. The organization morphed into politics and won electoral victories in 1890 and 1892 with its populist programs. The success of Las Gorras Blancas resulted in the removal of most fences from ranches and increased access to the common lands by the Hispanic residents. This success was temporary as by the mid-1890s the organization had ceased to be and the ranchers, railroads, lawyers, and speculators had begun to control most of the land once again.

== Background ==
The Spanish and Mexican governments of New Mexico made hundreds of grants of land totaling millions of acres to groups and individuals as inducements to create or expand settlement of the border regions of the colony. New Mexico became part of the United States in 1848 with the Treaty of Guadalupe Hidalgo. The United States agreed in the treaty that all residents of former Mexican territory had the right of "retaining the property which they possess in the said territories, or disposing thereof, and removing the proceeds wherever they please." The history of land grants since the treaty consisted of attempts to reconcile U.S. land laws with those of Mexico and adjudicating disputes between grant owners and claimants and the largely Anglo American new arrivals to New Mexico. In the 19th century, the ownership and usage of grant lands became the "key political struggle" in New Mexico, attracting the interest of land speculators known collectively as the Santa Fe Ring and resulting in the dispossession of Hispanic settlers of most of the land in the grants.

== Las Vegas land grant ==
In 1835, the Mexican government created the Las Vegas Grant of 431,654 acres (174,684 ha) (674 sqmi) in what became San Miguel County, New Mexico. The grant was one of the largest land grants and it quickly became one of the most successful in attracting settlers to the frontier of colonial New Mexico in a region still menaced by Native American (Indian) raids.

The rapid growth in the largely-Hispanic population in the grant area was due to its proximity to the Santa Fe Trail, the quality of its grazing land on the Great Plains, and the timber and water in its highlands. (Las Vegas means "the meadows" in English.) In 1835, the town of Las Vegas was created by Hispanic settlers, many with families. The establishment of Fort Union nearby in 1851 increased the security of the fledging community and provided employment for residents and a market for Las Vegas products. In 1854, the U.S. government created the office of the Surveyor General to resolve questions of the ownership of grant land. The Surveyors General became "aligned [with] the Santa Fe Ring, a group of 'ambitious, unscrupulous Anglo lawyers who regarded the confused legal status of the land grants as an ideal opportunity for adding money and land to their personal assets.'"

The coming of the railroad in 1879 expanded a market for ranch land and stimulated the livestock industry, especially of sheep for wool. The railroad company also harvested much of the timber in the country to make railroad ties. Anglo cattle ranchers moved into the area from Texas. A ranch manager later said of the Anglo ranchers, "The range men of those times treated the entire Spanish American people as if they had no rights at all; refused to have any social relations with them...killed them, dispossessed them of their lands; scattered their sheep, and drove off their cattle." By 1890, a few Anglo ranchers controlled one-half of the grazing lands in San Miguel County. Homesteaders also moved into San Miguel County, claiming 160 acres (65 ha) of land as allowed by the 1862 Homestead Act. Both large ranchers and small homesteaders built homes, barns, and fenced grant land with barbed-wire, ignoring the claims of Hispanic residents. In 1887, the rights of Hispanic settlers to the land were challenged in court. Although an arbitrator found in favor of the Hispanics, the judge failed to act on the case while Anglo settlement continued to increase.

== Nightriders and protests ==
In 1889 with a background of Hispanic residents losing land and access to irrigation water to speculators and homesteaders and distrust of the U.S. courts which rarely ruled in favor of Hispanic petitioners, the Gorras Blancas burst on the scene in San Miguel County to the surprise of both the Anglos and the Hispanic leadership of the county. In April 1889, the first raid of the Gorra Blancas was on a ranch belonging to two British ranchers near San Geronimo. 9 miles (14 km) west of the town of Las Vegas. The Gorras Blancas destroyed 4 miles (6.4 km) of fences, reducing the fence posts to splinters and cutting the barbed wire into small pieces. Other raids and warnings followed: three in May, five in June, three in July, and three in August.

In June and July 1889, the Gorras Blancas attacked a sawmill owned by José Ignacio Lujan near San Ignacio, 14 miles (23 km) north of Las Vegas. In June, they burned the house down of J.B. Snouffer in Fulton, a railroad station 20 miles (32 km) southwest of Las Vegas. In August they destroyed fences of a ranch owned by Sheriff Lorenzo Lopez only 5 miles (8.0 km) south of Las Vegas. Lopez removed the remainder of his fence and later became a supporter of the Gorras Blancas. In November 1889 they had a gun battle with a railway station agent at Rowe. Nobody was hurt. They also set fire to the houses of the U.S. Surveyor General and a militia captain. Raids attributed to the Gorras Blancas continued until Spring 1892 at a rate of several per month.

Las Gorras Blancas was a secret organization and its leaders and members were mostly unknown. Usually cited as the leaders were brothers Juan Jose, Pablo, and Nicanor Herrera. Juan Jose was the most prominent. He was in his mid to late fifties, a former soldier for the Union Army during the American Civil War, an organizer for the Knights of Labor, and an orator. The geographic extent of the raids of the Gorras Blancas indicates a sizeable number of members, communication, and planning.

Attempts to prosecute alleges members of the Gorras Blancas were ineffective. On November 1, 1889 at midnight, 63 armed horsemen mounted men demonstrated in front of the courthouse, the jail, and the home of the District Attorney. A few days later charges against 21 alleged fence cutters were dropped. In May 1890, charges against another 47 men were dropped when witnesses failed to appear in court. The governor of New Mexico, L. Bradford Prince, became aware of the public support for the Gorras Blancas on July 4, 1890. At a celebration in Las Vegas, in the presence of the governor, speaker after speaker, including Juan Jose and Nicanor Herrera, criticized the land grabs of the speculators and ranchers to the cheers of the crowd, mostly Hispanic but including a few Anglos. The night before one thousand horsemen had paraded through the streets. They rode in opposition to the Santa Fe Railroad and low wages and many of them were believed to belong to the Gorras Blancas.

== Consequences ==
The success of the Gorras Blancas in mobilizing public opinion against land-grabbers, railroads, and the Santa Fe Ring in San Miguel County let to the formation of a political party, El Partido del Pueblo Unido (United People's Party), which enjoyed electoral success in 1890 and 1892, winning all the electoral offices in the country. Internal bickering destroyed the party in the 1894 election. Land disputes shifted to the legal arena. The U.S. government abolished the corrupt Surveyor General system and created a new institution, the Court of Private Land Claims in 1891. The Court allocated the common lands of the Las Vegas land grant, which comprised the majority of land in the grant, to the towns of Las Vegas (mostly Anglo) and East Las Vegas (mostly Hispanic). However, a Board of Trustees selected to manage the grant lands proved to be more in agreement with rich rather than poor people with the result that attorneys and investors gradually acquired most of the land. By 1942, only 29,000 acres (12,000 ha) of the original 431,654 acres of the grant remained in common land. In 2004, the Las Vegas common land totaled 10,340 acres (4,180 ha).

One of the reputed leaders of the Gorras Blancas, Pablo Herrera, was elected to the territorial legislature in 1890, but resigned in 1891 with the comment, "there is more honesty in the halls of the territorial prison than in the halls of the legislature." With his return to San Miguel country, officials feared a resurgence of the Gorras Blancas but Herrera was shot and killed by a deputy sheriff in front of the courthouse in Las Vegas. The deputy was not prosecuted. After the Gorras Blancas movement died, Juan Jose Herrera attempted to remain active in politics, serving as a member of the board of the so-called "Union Party" (a successor to the United People's Party) up until the time of his death. He died of typhoid fever at 7:15 on the morning of Oct. 10, 1902. Nicanor Herrera lived quietly after the death of his brothers, away from the news headlines, until he died at the age of 82 on May 3, 1930.

== Declaration ==
On March 12, 1890, the Las Vegas Optic published the "Proclamation of Las Gorras Blancas:"

Not wishing to be misunderstood, we hereby make this our declaration.

Our purpose is to protect the rights and interests of the people in general; especially those of the helpless classes.

We want the Las Vegas Grant settled to the benefit of all concerned, and this we hold is the entire community within the grant.

We want no "land grabbers" or obstructionists of any sort to interfere. We will watch them.

We are not down on lawyers as a class, but the usual knavery and unfair treatment of the people must be stopped.

Our judiciary hereafter must understand that we will sustain it only when "Justice" is its watchword.

The practice of "double-dealing" must cease.

There is a wide difference between New Mexico's "law" and "justice." And justice is God's law, and that we must have at all hazards.

We are down on race issues, and will watch race agitators. We are all human brethren, under the same glorious flag.

We favor irrigation enterprises, but will fight any scheme that tends to monopolize the supply of water courses to the detriment of residents living on lands watered by the same streams.

We favor all enterprises, but object to corrupt methods to further the same.

We do not care how much you get so long as you do it fairly and honestly.

The People are suffering from the effects of partisan "bossism" and these bosses had better quietly hold their peace. The people have been persecuted and hacked about in every which way to satisfy their caprice. If they persist in their usual methods retribution will be their reward.

We are watching "political informers."

We have no grudge against any person in particular, but we are the enemies of bulldozers and tyrants.

We must have a free ballot and a fair count. And the will of the majority shall be respected.

Intimidation and the "indictment" plan have no further fears for us. If the old system should continue, death would be a relief to our sufferings. And for our rights our lives are the least we can pledge.

If the fact that we are law abiding citizens is questioned, come out to our homes and see the hunger and desolation we are suffering; and "this" is the result of the deceitful and corrupt methods of "bossism."

Be fair and just and we are with you, do otherwise and take the consequences."

The White Caps, 1,500 Strong and Growing Daily
