= New Mexico State Road 276 =

State highway in New Mexico, United States

State Road 276
- NM 276 highlighted in red

Route information
- Maintained by NMDOT
- Length: 5.800 mi (9.334 km)

Major junctions
- East end: NM 107
- West end: End of state maintenance by Lower Rociada

Location
- Country: United States
- State: New Mexico
- Counties: San Miguel

Highway system
- New Mexico State Highway System; Interstate; US; State; Scenic
| ← NM 275 | → NM 277 |

State Road 276 (NM 276) is a state highway in the US state of New Mexico. Its total length is approximately 41.7 miles (67.1 km). NM 276's eastern terminus is at NM 105, and the western terminus is at the end of state maintenance by Lower Rociada.

== Major intersections ==
The entire route is in San Miguel County.

| Location | mi | km | Destinations | Notes |
|---|---|---|---|---|
| | 0.000 | 0.000 | NM 105 | Eastern terminus |
| | 41.722 | 67.145 | End of state maintenance | Western terminus |
1.000 mi = 1.609 km; 1.000 km = 0.621 mi
