= Sabinoso Wilderness =

Wilderness area in New Mexico, US

- IUCN category Ib (wilderness area)
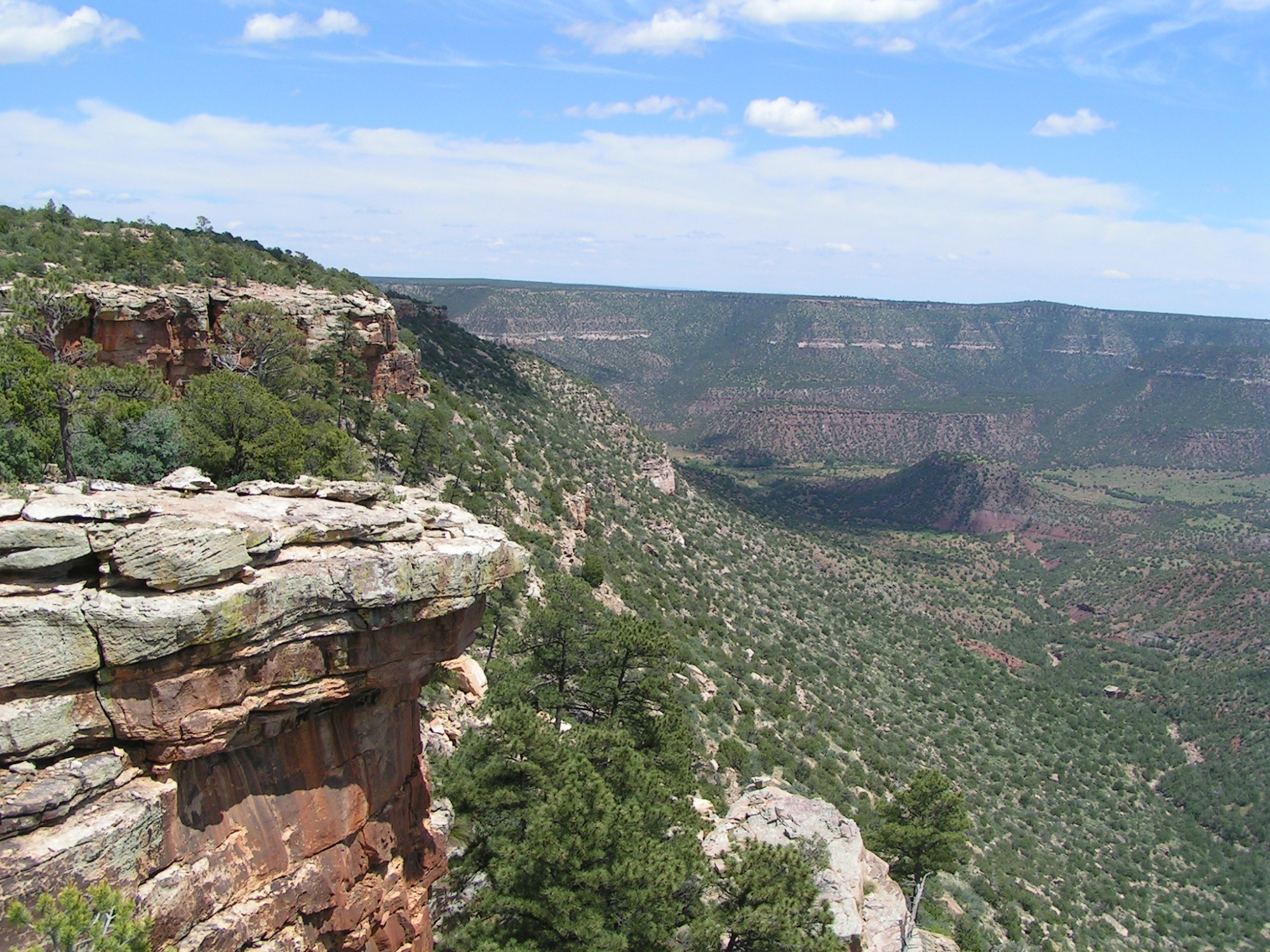

- Location within the United States
- Location: San Miguel County, New Mexico, United States
- Nearest city: Las Vegas, New Mexico
- Coordinates: 35.679°N 104.441°W
- Area: 29,855 acres (120.82 km^{2}) (2021)
- Established: 2009
- Governing body: Bureau of Land Management
- Website: Sabinoso Wilderness

The Sabinoso Wilderness is a 29,855 acres (120.82 km^{2}) area in San Miguel County, New Mexico. The US Bureau of Land Management owns and administers the wilderness area. The semi-arid wilderness includes few natural resources but has a diverse geology, as well as a range of plant and animal species.

There were multiple failed legislative attempts to establish the Sabinoso Wilderness, both as an individual bill as well as part of more comprehensive legislation, prior to the eventual success in 2009 as part of an omnibus bill. As of March 2017, the wilderness was inaccessible to the public without trespassing, as it and adjoining state-owned property were entirely surrounded by privately owned land. In conjunction with the Wyss Foundation, a road to allow public access through the donation and purchase of additional adjacent lands was implemented and the wilderness opened to the public on November 10, 2017. In 2021, the size of the wilderness was increased by 9,855 acres (39.88 km^{2}) with a donation from the Trust for Public Land which acquired the former Hobo Ranch. A second public access road is planned.

== Legislative history ==
On June 7, 2007, Tom Udall introduced H.R. 2632, the Sabinoso Wilderness Act of 2008, which would have set aside a total of 15,995 acres of land for the site. The bill passed the US House of Representatives on June 9, 2008, by a voice vote, but never passed the Senate.

On March 13, 2008, Raúl Grijalva introduced H.R. 5610, the Protecting America’s Wild Places Act of 2008. Title III of the act, Sabinoso Wilderness, would have set aside 19,880 acres of land for the site. It was passed by neither the House nor the Senate.

On February 9, 2009, Ben Ray Luján introduced H.R. 921, the Sabinoso Wilderness Act of 2009, which would have set aside 15,995 acres for the site, and was not passed by either chamber.

Sabinoso was finally established as part of the Omnibus Public Lands Management Act of 2009, signed into law by Barack Obama on March 30, 2009. Subtitle G Section 1602 reads:

In furtherance of the purposes of the Wilderness Act (16 U.S.C. 1131 et seq.), the approximately 16,030 acres of land under the jurisdiction of the Taos Field Office Bureau of Land Management, New Mexico, as generally depicted on the map, is designated as wilderness and as a component of the National Wilderness Preservation System, to be known as the 'Sabinoso Wilderness'. (Note: See also the Wilderness Act of 1964.)

== Description ==
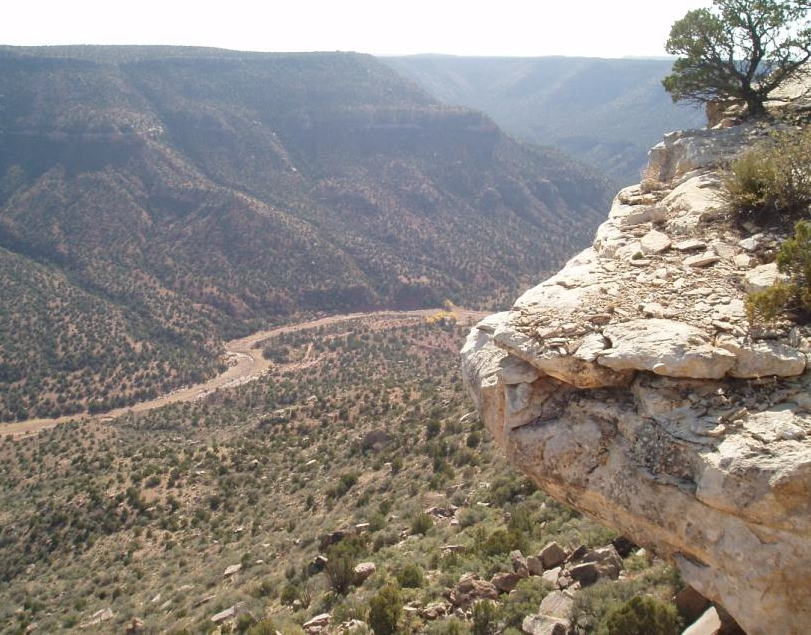
View across Cañon Largo

The Sabinoso Wilderness area consists of canyons and steep-sided mesas with elevations ranging from 4,500 feet (1,400 m) to 6,000 feet (1,800 m). The mesa tops are grassland while the canyon walls support a pinyon pine and juniper woodland with scattered groves of ponderosa pine. The area is semi-arid receiving 16 inches (410 mm) to 18 inches (460 mm) precipitation annually.

The canyon bottoms have periodically flowing streams, as well as deep incisions cut by the Cañon Olguin, Cañon Largo, and Lagartija Creek. (Note: Cañón being the Spanish root of the English Canyon) Riparian vegetation such as cottonwood and willow trees is found along the ephemeral streams. Wildlife includes, elk, mule deer, black bear, and wild turkey.

The northeastern corner of the wilderness area is near the Canadian River and the 1890s settlement of Sabinoso, now mostly abandoned except for a few remaining buildings. No other settlements, except a few ranches, are near the wilderness area. The nearest city is Las Vegas, New Mexico, about 50 miles distant by road.

=== Geology ===
The Sabinoso Wilderness contains a sequence of sedimentary rocks, which are close to flat lying or dipping very gently to the southeast. These rocks are almost entirely sandstones, siltstones, and shales, and represent geological time from the Late Triassic to the Early Cretaceous epochs. These rocks record a variety of paleoenvironments, including alluvial streams, floodplains, lakes and ponds, wind-blown eolian dunes, and in the youngest of the rocks, some sandy shallow marine settings.

The geological formations represented at the surface within the Wilderness include the Santa Rosa, Chinle, Entrada, Morrison, and Mesa Rica Formations. Buried beneath the area are Paleozoic sedimentary rocks and Precambrian crystalline rocks making up the geological basement.

Several of the lithologies present in the Wilderness have eroded to form prominent cliffs, including the thick sandstone beds of the Chinle Formation, and the Entrada Sandstone. The former are reddish-brown to maroon; the latter a salmon-orange color.

=== Mineral resources ===
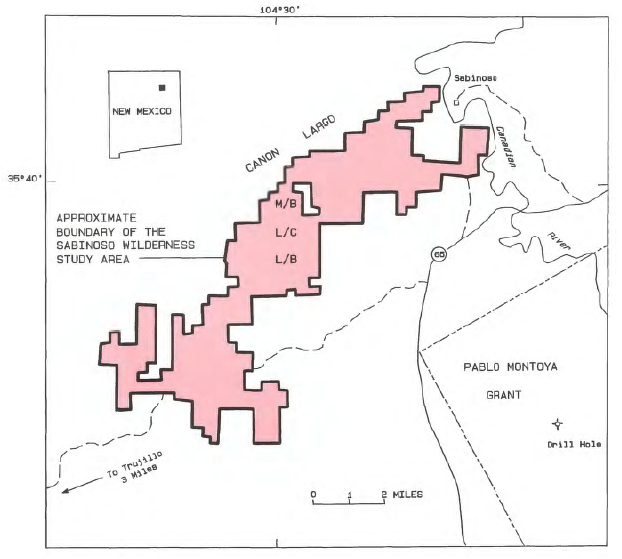
United States Geological Survey map showing areas of moderate potential for uranium

In 1987 the United States Geological Survey published a report on the mineral resources of Sabinoso. They concluded that "no identified mineral resources were found in the study area." While they identified some occurrences of uranium associated with the Chinle Formation, the deposits were too small, scattered and low-grade to constitute a viable resources for uranium.

=== Cultural resources ===
As of 2025 the area had not been systematically surveyed for cultural resources. However, the archaeological record of the surrounding territory suggests a high density of prehistoric Paleo-Indian sites, as well as sites related to the period of homesteading and ranching, around the mid-19th century. Many of the artifacts which have been found in the area are centered along the Largo Canyon Road which is thought to be a pre-historic trail, as well as a road used by the United States Army to connect Fort Union and Fort Bascom.

=== Grazing ===
Cattle grazing on Sabinoso is rare due to the relative scarcity of water. However, 10 grazing allotments (Note: See Taylor Grazing Act of 1934.) had been granted as of 2013, with grazing taking place mostly in the southern portion of the area.

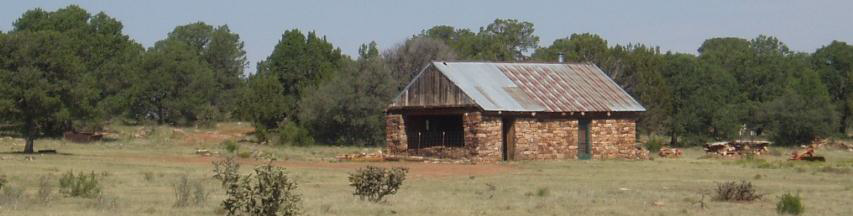
A building reflecting the history of grazing in the wilderness

== Public access ==
A map of the Sabinoso Wilderness in 2017 after public access was obtained by land purchase

Sabinoso Wilderness Area is surrounded by privately owned land and initially had no route for public access. About a dozen state-owned parcels of land adjoin Sabinoso, but they are themselves also "landlocked", entirely surrounded by privately owned property.

In 2016 the Wilderness Land Trust, financed by the Wyss Foundation, purchased the 4,080 acres (16.5 km^{2}) Rimrock Rose Ranch for $3,150,000 with the goal of enabling public access to the area. The environmental evaluations needed before visitors would be allowed to enter the wilderness, were estimated to require up to a year to complete, and were made available for public comment as of August 2016.

In August 2016, the Bureau of Land Management proposed to accept a donation of 3,314 acres (13.41 km^{2}) of the Rimrock Rose Ranch for addition to the Wilderness Area. The BLM proposed to purchase the remaining 786 acres (3.18 km^{2}) of the ranch, as well as 766 acres (3.10 km^{2}) of inholdings. They also plan to cancel two allotments for livestock grazing to alleviate the impact on the sparse riparian environments. The transfer of the land was finalized in 2017.

The Wilderness became open to the public on November 10, 2017, accessible from an improved dirt road along San Miguel County Road C51A. Ryan Zinke, the United States Secretary of the Interior stated "the Sabinoso Wilderness Area is finally open and accessible to hunters and all members of the public for the first time ever."

On July 17, 2021, Secretary of the Interior Debra Haaland accepted a donation of 9,855 acres, which both increased the size of the designated wilderness area by about 50% and provided for a second public access point.

== See also ==
- List of U.S. Wilderness Areas
- National Wilderness Preservation System
