= Holy Ghost, New Mexico =

Holy Ghost
- Unincorporated community
- Location within the state of New Mexico Holy Ghost (the United States)
- Coordinates: 35°45′36″N 105°41′33″W
- Country: United States
- State: New Mexico
- County: San Miguel
- Elevation: 7,966 ft (2,428 m)
- Time zone: UTC-7 (Mountain (MST))
  - Summer (DST): UTC-6 (MDT)
- GNIS feature ID: 907043

Holy Ghost is an unincorporated community in San Miguel County, New Mexico, United States.

The settlement is located within the Santa Fe National Forest, approximately 14 mi (23 km) northeast of Santa Fe.

The United States Forest Service translated the area's Spanish name, Espiritu Santo (Holy Spirit), and applied it to a campground, summer home area and creek located there.

The Forest Service describes the Holy Ghost Campground as "situated in a beautiful steep canyon right along Holy Ghost Creek".
