= Serafina, New Mexico =

Unincorporated community in New Mexico, United States

Serafina
- Unincorporated community
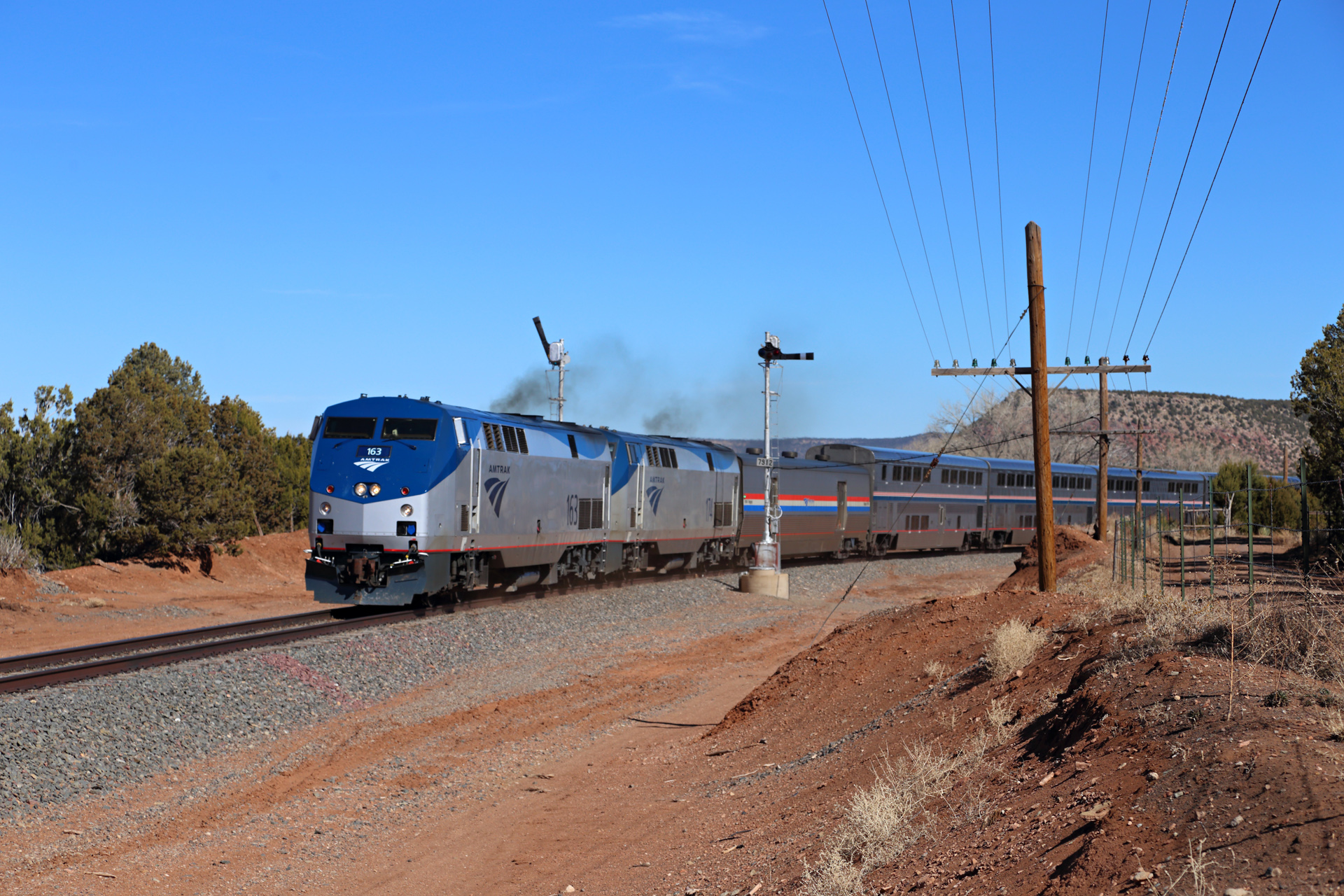
- Amtrak Southwest Chief in Bernal (part of Serafina) in 2019

- Location within the state of New Mexico Serafina (the United States)
- Coordinates: 35°23′51″N 105°19′25″W
- Country: United States
- State: New Mexico
- County: San Miguel
- Elevation: 6,204 ft (1,891 m)
- Time zone: UTC-7 (Mountain (MST))
  - Summer (DST): UTC-6 (MDT)
- ZIP codes: 87569
- Area code: 505
- GNIS feature ID: 910944

Serafina is an unincorporated community located in San Miguel County, New Mexico, United States. The community is located along Interstate 25, 15 miles (24 km) south-southwest of Las Vegas. Serafina has a post office with ZIP code 87569.
