= New Mexico State Road 129 =

State highway in New Mexico, United States

State Road 129

Route information
- Maintained by NMDOT
- Length: 17.383 mi (27.975 km)

Major junctions
- South end: I-40 / US 54 in Newkirk
- North end: NM 104 in Mesa Rica

Location
- Country: United States
- State: New Mexico
- Counties: Guadalupe, San Miguel

Highway system
- New Mexico State Highway System; Interstate; US; State; Scenic
← NM 128	→ NM 130

State Road 129 (NM 129) is an approximately 17.4-mile-long (28.0 km) state highway in the U.S. state of New Mexico. Its southern terminus is at Interstate 40 (I-40) and U.S. Route 54 (US 54) in Newkirk, and the northern terminus is in Mesa Rica at NM 104.

== Major intersections ==
County	Location	mi	km	Destinations	Notes
Guadalupe	Newkirk	0.000	0.000	I-40 / US 54	Southern terminus, I-40 exit 300
San Miguel	Mesa Rica	17.383	27.975	NM 104	Northern terminus
1.000 mi = 1.609 km; 1.000 km = 0.621 mi
