= New Mexico State Road 432 =

State highway in New Mexico, United States

State Road 432
- NM 432 highlighted in red

Route information
- Maintained by NMDOT
- Length: 1.000 mi (1.609 km)

Major junctions
- South end: NM 104
- North end: Conchas State Park

Location
- Country: United States
- State: New Mexico
- Counties: San Miguel

Highway system
- New Mexico State Highway System; Interstate; US; State; Scenic
← NM 431	→ NM 433

State Road 432 (NM 432) is a one mile (1.6 km) state highway in the US state of New Mexico. NM 432's southern terminus is at NM 104, and the northern terminus is at Conchas State Park.

== Major intersections ==
The entire route is in San Miguel County.

Location	mi	km	Destinations	Notes
	0.000	0.000	NM 104	Southern terminus
	1.000	1.609	Conchas State Park	Northern terminus
1.000 mi = 1.609 km; 1.000 km = 0.621 mi
