= Trementina, New Mexico =

Unincorporated community in New Mexico, United States

Coordinates: 35°28′11″N 104°31′40″W

Trementina is an unincorporated community in San Miguel County, New Mexico, United States. In 2010, it had a population of 184 people. The ZIP Code for Trementina is 88439.

Its name is Spanish for turpentine, in reference to the pitch of the pinon pine, which was used by the Spanish Americans as a folk medicine and a substitute for chewing gum. Largely consisting of ranch property, Trementina is sparsely populated and has such a preponderance of abandoned buildings that some classify it as a ghost town.

== Spanish-American origins ==
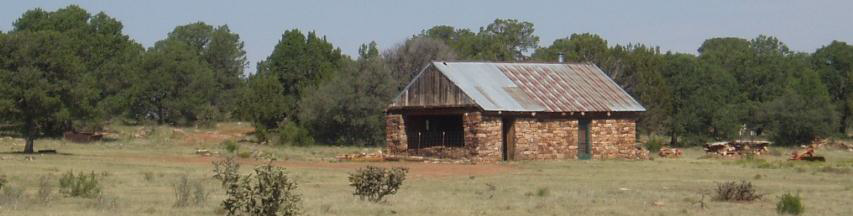
Structure near the Cañon Largo in the Sabinoso Wilderness

Trementina was originally a Spanish American village founded after the American Civil War primarily by sheepherders who grazed their sheep in the mesas and grasslands between Cañon Largo to the north (now part of the Sabinoso Wilderness area) and Variadero Mesa to the South and the Canadian River to the East and the Conchas River to the West. Santiago Blea is credited with founding the community. The early Spanish Americans who settled the area defined land ownership by points of reference. When the area was surveyed by the U.S. Geological Survey in 1880, many people lost their land because they did not understand the new laws and did not file for homesteads. Other U.S. citizens from he east took advantage of the new laws and homesteaded tracts of lands. The Spanish Americans were a forgiving people and lived peacefully with the homesteaders. Gradually the Spanish American and homesteaders intermarried and raised their children in the area.

=== The homesteaders depart ===
Many of the homesteaders left after a drought between 1918 and 1923 and sold their homesteads to those who chose to remain. The result was the creation of larger ranches which eventually chose cattle in place of sheep. The community survived and dozens of families lived in Trementina until the mid-1950s. A Presbyterian missionary by the name of Alice Blake lived among the people for about 40 years and brought many innovations to the community and encouraged education. Many of the descendants of Trementina have gone on to higher education. The community diminished in population after World War II when veterans returned to ruined ranches and took jobs in the nearby cities to support their families. The descendants of Trementina retain a strong identity and hold an annual reunion each Memorial Day to honor the many veterans from the area and to reinforce the sense of community.

== See also ==
- Trementina Base
