= Mosquero, New Mexico =

Village in New Mexico, United States

- Village
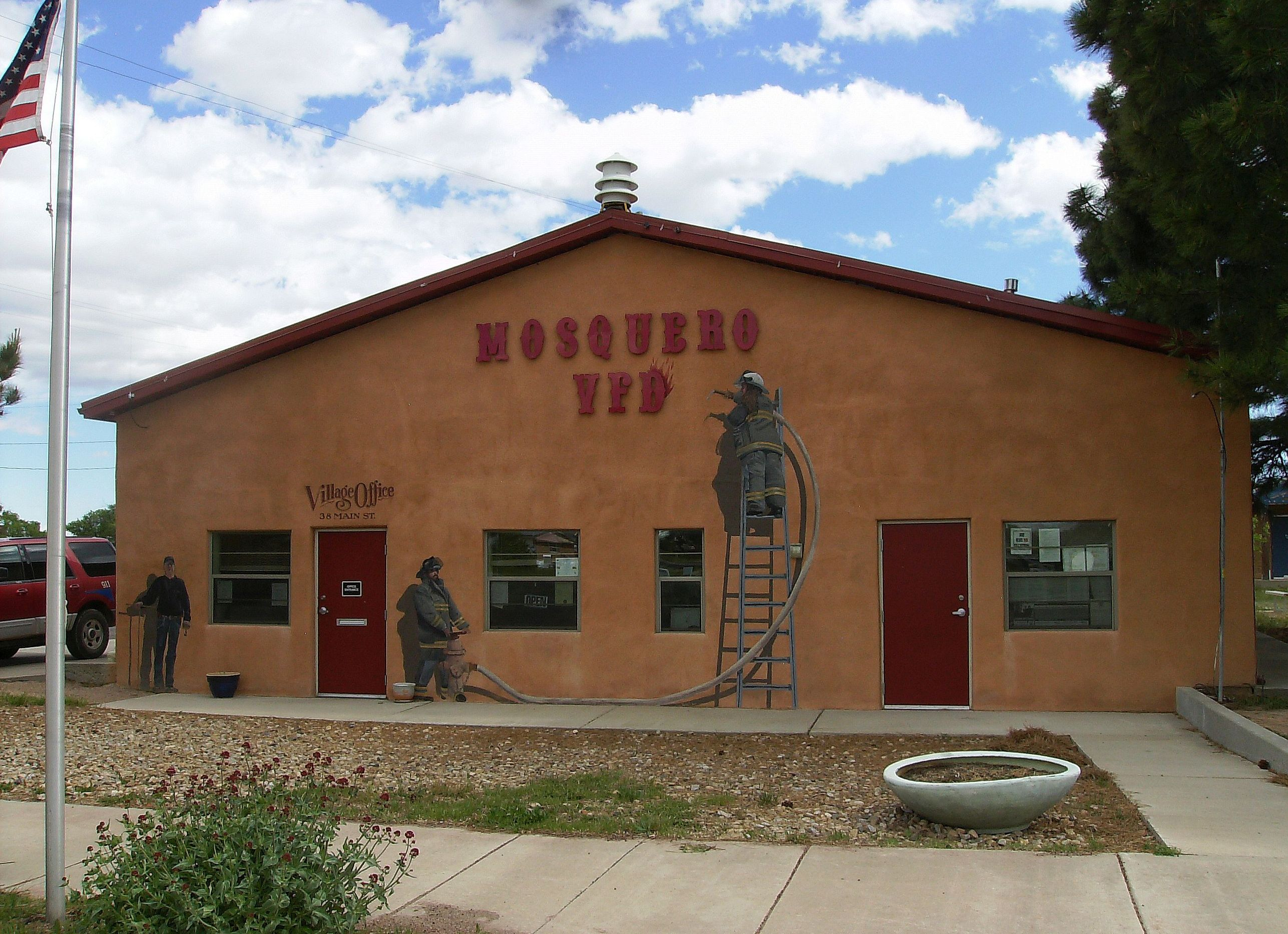
- Mosquero Village Office

- Location of Mosquero, New Mexico

- Location in New Mexico
- Coordinates: 35°46′28″N 103°57′16″W
- Country: United States
- State: New Mexico
- Counties: Harding, San Miguel

Area
  - Total: 1.00 sq mi (2.58 km^{2})
  - Land: 1.00 sq mi (2.58 km^{2})
  - Water: 0 sq mi (0.00 km^{2})
- Elevation: 5,584 ft (1,702 m)

Population (2020)
  - Total: 98
  - Density: 98.2/sq mi (37.92/km^{2})
- Time zone: UTC-7 (Mountain (MST))
  - Summer (DST): UTC-6 (MDT)
- ZIP code: 87733
- Area code: 575
- FIPS code: 35-50300
- GNIS feature ID: 2413574
- Website: www.villageofmosquero.com

Mosquero is a village in Harding and San Miguel counties in the U.S. state of New Mexico. As of the 2020 census, Mosquero had a population of 98. It is the county seat of Harding County; only a small portion of the village extends into San Miguel County.

== Geography ==
New Mexico State Road 39 passes through the village, leading southeast 50 miles (80 km) to Logan and northwest 18 miles (29 km) to Roy.

According to the United States Census Bureau, the village has a total area of 1.0 square mile (2.6 km^{2}), all land.

== History ==
The site was a water stop along the Dawson Railway, built in 1902 from Tucumcari to Dawson. The name in Spanish translates as "swarm of flies", reputedly from the flies that were drawn to carcasses of bison hunted by local native tribes. The village was founded in 1908 by Benjamin Brown, and a post office was established here in that year.

The community developed as a farming and stock-raising and shipping point, with a dry ice plant, using carbon dioxide from local wells drilled into the Bravo Dome carbon dioxide gas field, which lies beneath Harding and Union counties. The railroad, absorbed into the Southern Pacific, was removed in 1950 and the population dwindled after the dry ice plant was destroyed.

== Demographics ==
Historical population
Census	Pop.	Note	%±
1930	401		—
1940	742		85.0%
1950	583		−21.4%
1960	310		−46.8%
1970	244		−21.3%
1980	197		−19.3%
1990	164		−16.8%
2000	120		−26.8%
2010	93		−22.5%
2020	98		5.4%
U.S. Decennial Census

As of the census of 2000, there were 120 people, 60 households, and 33 families residing in the village. The population density was 120.8 people per square mile (46.6 people/km^{2}). There were 86 housing units at an average density of 86.5 per square mile (33.4/km^{2}). The racial makeup of the village was 70.00% White, 25.83% from other races, and 4.17% from two or more races. Hispanic or Latino of any race were 77.50% of the population.

There were 60 households, out of which 16.7% had children under the age of 18 living with them, 45.0% were married couples living together, 8.3% had a female householder with no husband present, and 45.0% were non-families. 41.7% of all households were made up of individuals, and 23.3% had someone living alone who was 65 years of age or older. The average household size was 2.00 and the average family size was 2.76.

In the village, the population was spread out, with 17.5% under the age of 18, 4.2% from 18 to 24, 20.0% from 25 to 44, 31.7% from 45 to 64, and 26.7% who were 65 years of age or older. The median age was 51 years. For every 100 females, there were 114.3 males. For every 100 females age 18 and over, there were 110.6 males.

The median income for a household in the village was $25,000, and the median income for a family was $32,917. Males had a median income of $19,167 versus $16,250 for females. The per capita income for the village was $11,915. There were 14.6% of families and 21.6% of the population living below the poverty line, including 41.4% of under eighteens and 22.2% of those over 64.

== Education ==
Mosquero Municipal School District provides education from pre-kindergarten through the 12th grade. A little over 100 students attend the district. The school offers students to participate in Future Farmers of America, The Harding County Roundup, a student-led newspaper; and a media club. Mosquero High School is home to a track team. Additionally, Mosquero and Roy Municipal Schools host collaborative basketball, volleyball, and 6 man football teams.

== Notable person ==
- Donald Enlow, orthodontics scientist

== Gallery ==
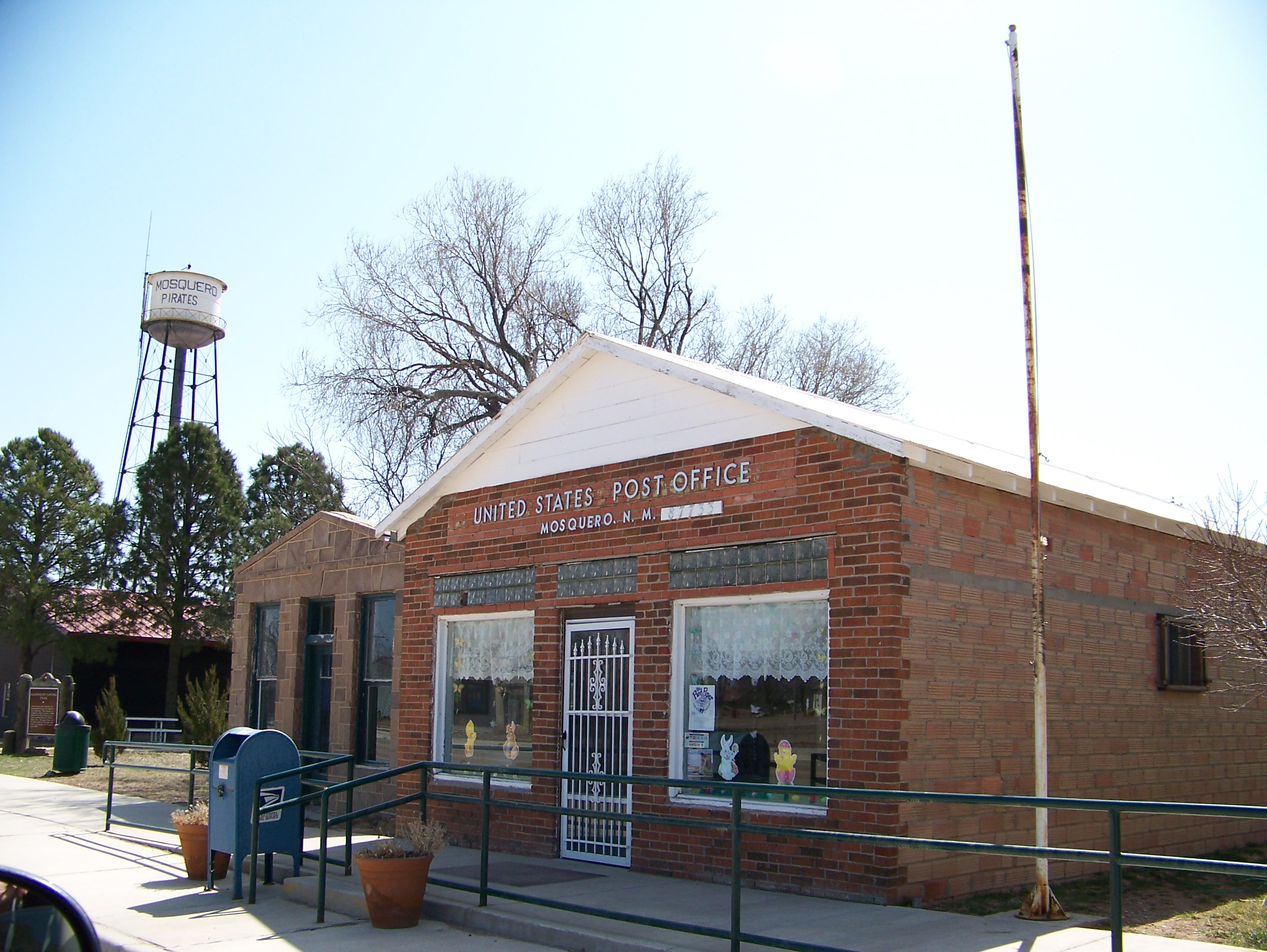
Mosquero post office & water tower

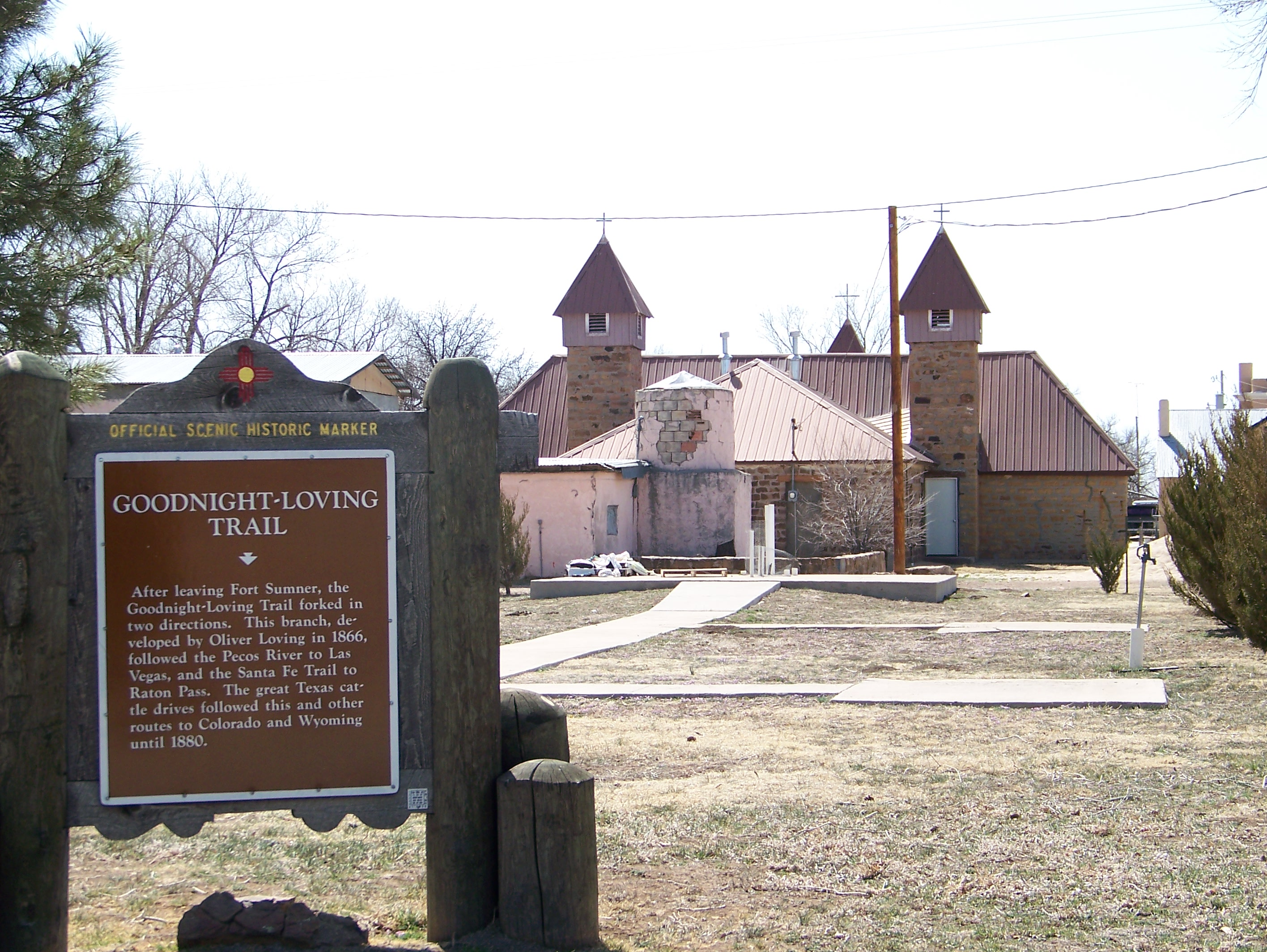
Goodnight-Loving Trail marker

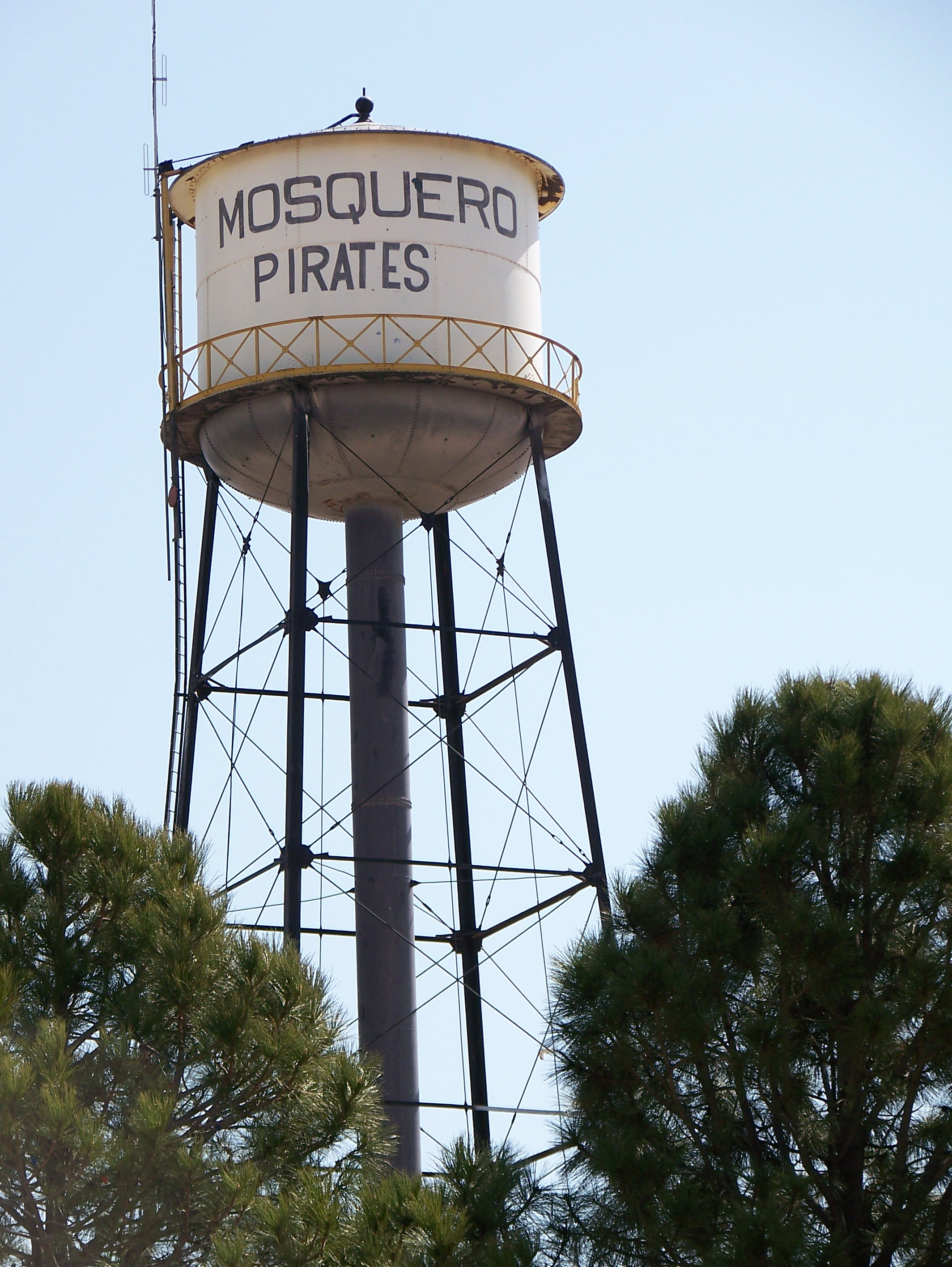
Mosquero Water Tower
