= Canadian Escarpment =

Mountains in New Mexico, United States

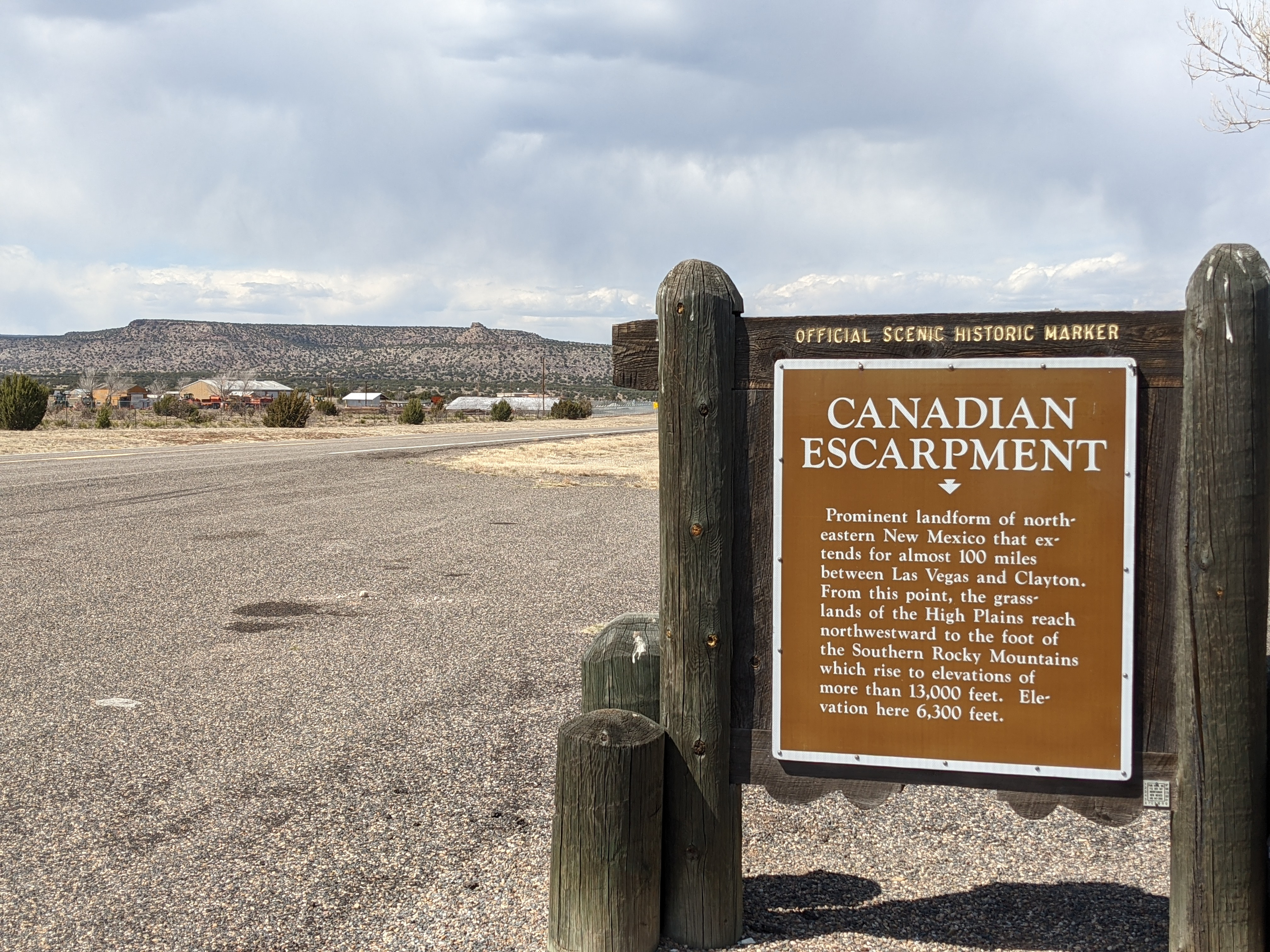
Historical Sign for the Canadian Escarpment in New Mexico, US

The Canadian Escarpment is part of the southernmost subrange of the Rocky Mountains, in the Las Vegas, New Mexico area. It straddles the boundary between the High Plains and Southern Rocky Mountain physiographic provinces, north of the Canadian River. It is situated near the Las Vegas Plateau, which is bounded by the Sangre de Cristo Mountains. The elevation of the area ranges from about 6,400 to 6,800 ft; the mountains to the west attain elevations of 10,500 ft.
