= Garita, New Mexico =

Garita
- Unincorporated community
- Location within the state of New Mexico Garita (the United States)
- Coordinates: 35°23′17″N 104°27′34″W
- Country: United States
- State: New Mexico
- County: San Miguel
- Elevation: 4,445 ft (1,355 m)
- Time zone: UTC-7 (Mountain (MST))
  - Summer (DST): UTC-6 (MDT)
- ZIP codes: 88421
- Area code: 575
- GNIS feature ID: 896104

Garita, also known as Variadero, is an unincorporated community located in San Miguel County, New Mexico, United States. The community is located on New Mexico State Road 104 where it crosses the Conchas River. It was founded in 1872 by Jesús Angel, a settler from Bernal.

Garita has a post office with ZIP code 88421, which opened on January 19, 1907; the post office used the name Variadero intermittently until the 1920s. The community's two names both come from Spanish terms; Variadero derives from variar, meaning "to change", due to the changes in the river's course, while Garita means "lookout" or "government building".

Variadero was initially called "Estrada" after the first settler, Jose Laureano Estrada, who made a permanent home along the Conchas Arroyo around the time of the Civil War. Jose Laureano is buried at the Catholic Cemetery across highway 104 from the Catholic Church in Variadero. His wife Filomena Estrada de Madrid is buried at his side. The gravemarker is still visible for both of them and his reads "Jose Laureano Estrada, 1835 - 1898, The first settler of Variadero."

Garita was settled as stated above. Garita, however, was the name given to the huge square blocks of sandstone about eight miles southeast of Variadero along highway 104 which reminded early settlers of a garita which is "sentry post" in Spanish. A small arroyo about a quarter mile northwest of the garita was named the Garita Creek. Later settlers made homes to the west, along the Garita Creek and a small community in that area was known as Garita. When Postal services were combined, the area developed the dual names of Garita and Variadero.
