= San Miguel County, New Mexico =

County in the United States

- County
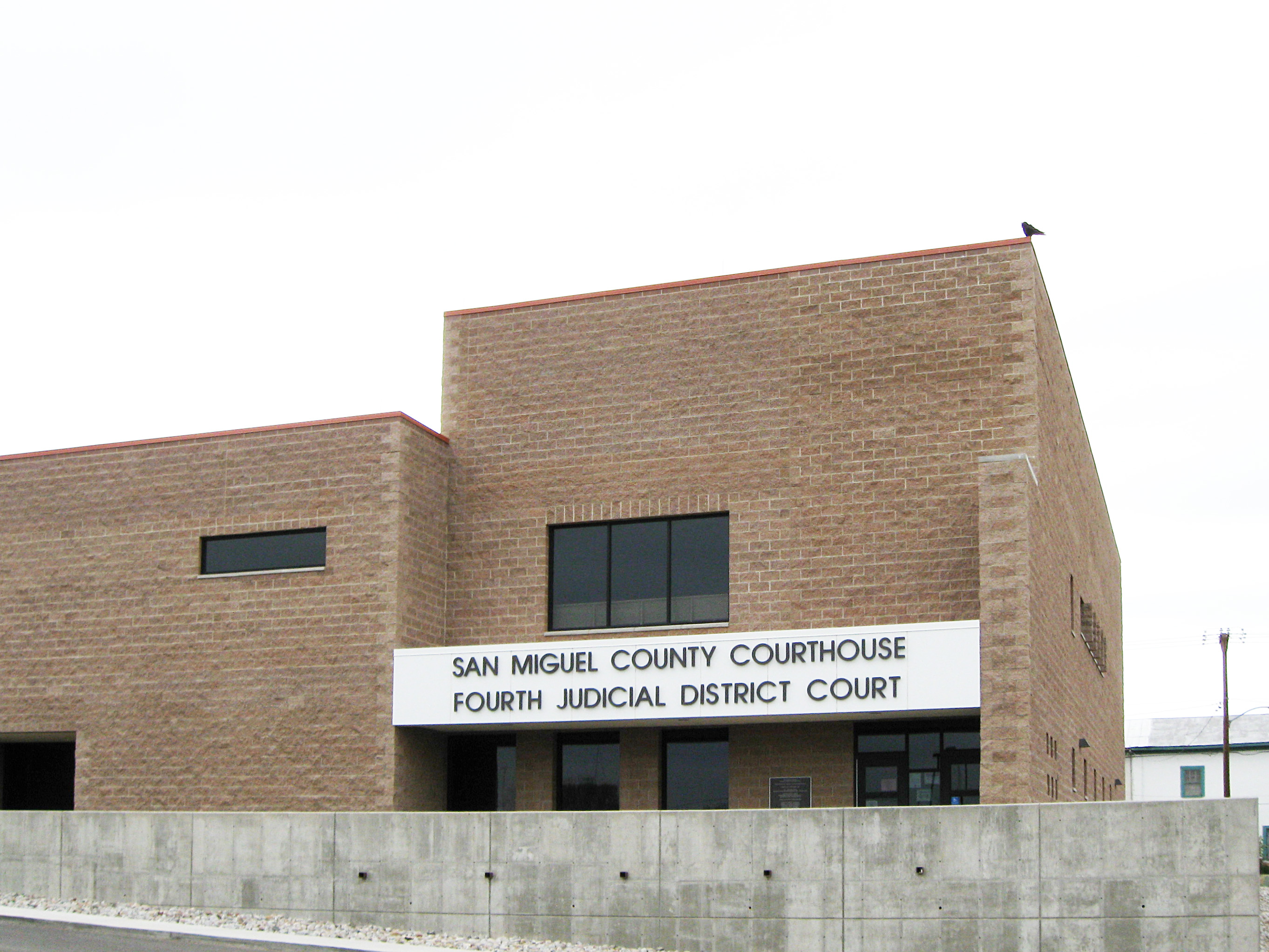
- San Miguel County Courthouse in Las Vegas

- Location within the U.S. state of New Mexico
- Coordinates: 35°28′N 104°50′W
- Country: United States
- State: New Mexico
- Founded: January 9, 1852
- Named for: San Miguel del Vado
- Seat: Las Vegas
- Largest city: Las Vegas

Area
  - Total: 4,736 sq mi (12,270 km^{2})
  - Land: 4,716 sq mi (12,210 km^{2})
  - Water: 20 sq mi (52 km^{2}) 0.4%

Population (2020)
  - Total: 27,201
  - Estimate (2025): 26,260 ▼
  - Density: 5.768/sq mi (2.227/km^{2})
- Time zone: UTC−7 (Mountain)
  - Summer (DST): UTC−6 (MDT)
- Congressional district: 3rd
- Website: co.sanmiguel.nm.us

San Miguel County (Spanish: Condado de San Miguel) is a county in the U.S. state of New Mexico. As of the 2020 census, the population was 27,201. Its county seat is Las Vegas.

San Miguel County comprises the Las Vegas Micropolitan Statistical Area, which is also included in the Albuquerque–Santa Fe–Las Vegas combined statistical area.

== Geography ==
According to the U.S. Census Bureau, the county has a total area of 4,736 square miles (12,270 km^{2}), of which 4,716 square miles (12,210 km^{2}) is land and 20 square miles (52 km^{2}) (0.4%) is water. The county is more than 100 miles (160 km) long from east to west and 40 miles (64 km) wide north to south and reaches from the Great Plains to the Rocky Mountains. The highest elevation in the county is 11,661 ft (3,554 m) at Elk Mountain and the lowest elevation is on the Canadian River at about 3,800 ft (1,200 m).

The eastern two thirds of the country is semi-arid steppe grassland. The Bell Ranch receives 15 in (380 mm) of precipitation annually, most in the summer months. The conifer-clad higher elevations in the northwest corner of the country are cooler and receive more precipitation. Gascon (near Rociada) at an elevation of 8,250 ft (2,510 m) receives 25 in (0.64 m) of annual precipitation. Wesner Springs at an elevation of 11,120 ft (3,390 m) on the slopes of Elk Mountain has a subarctic climate (Dfc), receiving 37 in (940 mm) of precipitation annually.

=== Adjacent counties ===
- Mora County – north
- Harding County – east
- Quay County – southeast
- Guadalupe County – south
- Torrance County – southwest
- Santa Fe County – west

=== National protected areas ===
- Las Vegas National Wildlife Refuge
- Pecos National Historical Park (part)
- Pecos Wilderness area (part)
- Santa Fe National Forest (part)

== History ==
San Miguel County was created in 1846 by the conquering United States' army in the Mexican-American War. New Mexico became part of the United States in the Treaty of Guadalupe Hidalgo of 1848. The boundaries of the county often changed until 1923 when its current boundaries were established.

In 1835, prior to the American conquest, the Mexican government granted land to individuals and communities in what became San Miguel County. The largest grant was the Las Vegas Grant of 431,654 acres (174,684 ha) (674 sqmi). Most of the grant land was designated as common land to be used by all the grantees and their descendants. The grant lands quickly attracted settlers, initially Hispanics, to the frontier of New Mexico in a region still menaced by Native American (Indian) raids. The Santa Fe Trail, first travelled in 1821, passed through the county, linking New Mexico to the United States.

The establishment of Fort Union nearby in 1851 increased the security of the region and provided employment for residents and a market for Las Vegas products. The coming of the railroad in 1879 expanded a market for ranch land and stimulated the livestock industry, especially of sheep for wool. The railroad company also harvested much of the timber in the country to make railroad ties. Anglo cattle ranchers moved into the area from Texas. By 1890, a few, mostly Anglo, ranchers controlled one-half of the grazing lands in San Miguel County. Homesteaders also moved into San Miguel County, claiming 160 acres (65 ha) of land as allowed by the 1862 Homestead Act. Both large ranchers and small homesteaders built homes, barns, and fenced grant land with barbed-wire, ignoring the claims by Hispanic residents of their rights to use the common land for crops, grazing, and timber harvest.

With Hispanic residents losing land and access to irrigation water to speculators, ranchers, and homesteaders, the secretive Gorras Blancas, "White Hats," burst on the scene in San Miguel County in 1889. The night riding Gorras Blancas destroyed fences and burned barns and other buildings. The Gorras Blancas were successful in gaining public support, eliminating many fences, and preserving access to common lands, but the movement faded in the early 1890s and the march toward converting common lands into private ownership soon resumed. By 2004, of the original land of the Las Vegas grant, only 10,340 acres (4,180 ha) remained in common ownership.

== Demographics ==
Historical population
Census	Pop.	Note	%±
1850	7,074		—
1860	13,714		93.9%
1870	16,058		17.1%
1880	20,638		28.5%
1890	24,204		17.3%
1900	22,053		−8.9%
1910	22,930		4.0%
1920	22,867		−0.3%
1930	23,636		3.4%
1940	27,910		18.1%
1950	26,512		−5.0%
1960	23,468		−11.5%
1970	21,951		−6.5%
1980	22,751		3.6%
1990	25,743		13.2%
2000	30,126		17.0%
2010	29,393		−2.4%
2020	27,201		−7.5%
2025 (est.)	26,260	▼	−3.5%
U.S. Decennial Census; 1790–1960 1900–1990; 1990–2000 2010

=== 2020 census ===
As of the 2020 census, the county had a population of 27,201. The median age was 44.3 years. 19.4% of residents were under the age of 18 and 21.7% of residents were 65 years of age or older. For every 100 females there were 98.6 males, and for every 100 females age 18 and over there were 98.2 males age 18 and over.

San Miguel County, New Mexico – Racial and ethnic composition Note: the US Census treats Hispanic/Latino as an ethnic category. This table excludes Latinos from the racial categories and assigns them to a separate category. Hispanics/Latinos may be of any race.
Race / Ethnicity (NH = Non-Hispanic)	Pop 2000	Pop 2010	Pop 2020	% 2000	% 2010	% 2020
White alone (NH)	5,690	5,781	5,447	18.89%	19.67%	20.03%
Black or African American alone (NH)	185	339	264	0.61%	1.15%	0.97%
Native American or Alaska Native alone (NH)	294	226	278	0.98%	0.77%	1.02%
Asian alone (NH)	130	175	132	0.43%	0.60%	0.49%
Pacific Islander alone (NH)	11	22	2	0.04%	0.07%	0.01%
Other race alone (NH)	44	52	132	0.15%	0.18%	0.49%
Mixed race or Multiracial (NH)	285	215	456	0.95%	0.73%	1.68%
Hispanic or Latino (any race)	23,487	22,583	20,490	77.96%	76.83%	75.33%
Total	30,126	29,393	27,201	100.00%	100.00%	100.00%

The racial makeup of the county was 45.5% White, 1.3% Black or African American, 2.0% American Indian and Alaska Native, 0.6% Asian, 0.0% Native Hawaiian and Pacific Islander, 20.9% from some other race, and 29.7% from two or more races. Hispanic or Latino residents of any race comprised 75.3% of the population.

53.4% of residents lived in urban areas, while 46.6% lived in rural areas.

There were 11,351 households in the county, of which 26.1% had children under the age of 18 living with them and 31.5% had a female householder with no spouse or partner present. About 33.8% of all households were made up of individuals and 14.6% had someone living alone who was 65 years of age or older.

There were 14,768 housing units, of which 23.1% were vacant. Among occupied housing units, 70.4% were owner-occupied and 29.6% were renter-occupied. The homeowner vacancy rate was 2.3% and the rental vacancy rate was 10.1%.

=== 2010 census ===
As of the 2010 census, there were 29,393 people, 11,978 households, and 7,275 families living in the county. The population density was 6.2 inhabitants per square mile (2.4/km^{2}). There were 15,595 housing units at an average density of 3.3 units per square mile (1.3 units/km^{2}). The racial makeup of the county was 66.6% white, 1.7% American Indian, 1.4% black or African American, 0.8% Asian, 0.1% Pacific islander, 25.4% from other races, and 3.9% from two or more races. Those of Hispanic or Latino origin made up 76.8% of the population. In terms of ancestry, 6.3% were German, 5.3% were English, and 1.6% were American.

Of the 11,978 households, 28.8% had children under the age of 18 living with them, 38.6% were married couples living together, 14.9% had a female householder with no husband present, 39.3% were non-families, and 32.5% of all households were made up of individuals. The average household size was 2.34 and the average family size was 2.95. The median age was 40.7 years.

The median income for a household in the county was $32,213 and the median income for a family was $42,888. Males had a median income of $35,176 versus $28,351 for females. The per capita income for the county was $18,508. About 15.7% of families and 24.8% of the population were below the poverty line, including 29.6% of those under age 18 and 22.7% of those age 65 or over.

=== 2000 census ===
As of the 2000 census, there were 30,126 people, 11,134 households, and 7,537 families living in the county. The population density was 6 people per square mile (2.3 people/km^{2}). There were 14,254 housing units at an average density of 3 units per square mile (1.2/km^{2}). The racial makeup of the county was 56.22% White, 0.78% Black or African American, 1.82% Native American, 0.54% Asian, 0.08% Pacific Islander, 36.21% from other races, and 4.33% from two or more races. 77.96% of the population were Hispanic or Latino of any race.

There were 11,134 households, out of which 34.60% had children under the age of 18 living with them, 44.50% were married couples living together, 16.40% had a female householder with no husband present, and 32.30% were non-families. 26.60% of all households were made up of individuals, and 8.20% had someone living alone who was 65 years of age or older. The average household size was 2.58 and the average family size was 3.10.

In the county, the population was spread out, with 27.40% under the age of 18, 10.90% from 18 to 24, 27.00% from 25 to 44, 22.90% from 45 to 64, and 11.70% who were 65 years of age or older. The median age was 35 years. For every 100 females there were 96.70 males. For every 100 females age 18 and over, there were 93.90 males.

The median income for a household in the county was $26,524, and the median income for a family was $31,250. Males had a median income of $27,307 versus $22,588 for females. The per capita income for the county was $13,268. About 19.90% of families and 24.40% of the population were below the poverty line, including 27.80% of those under age 18 and 25.90% of those age 65 or over.

== Communities ==
=== City ===
- Las Vegas (county seat)

=== Villages ===
- Mosquero (part)
- Pecos

=== Census-designated places ===
- Conchas Dam
- East Pecos
- North San Ysidro
- Pueblo
- Ribera
- Rowe
- San Jose
- Sena
- Soham
- Tecolote
- Tecolotito
- Villanueva

=== Other communities ===
- Bernal
- Canocito
- El Cerrito
- El Porvenir
- Garita
- Holy Ghost
- Ilfeld
- Montezuma
- Rociada
- San Miguel del Vado
- Sapello
- Serafina
- South San Ysidro
- Tererro
- Trementina
- Valles de San Geronimo

=== Ghost town ===
- Las Ruedas

== Education ==
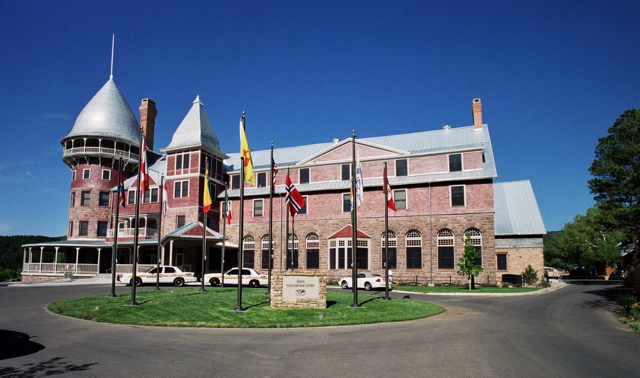
Montezuma Castle is on the campus of the United World College of the American West

Public school districts include:

- Las Vegas City Public Schools
- Pecos Independent Schools
- Santa Rosa Consolidated Schools
- West Las Vegas Public Schools

Tertiary education institutions in San Miguel County include:

- Armand Hammer United World College of the American West
- Luna Community College
- New Mexico Highlands University

Native American Preparatory School, a private school, was in operation in the county until 2002.

== Notable people ==
- Antonia Apodaca (1923–2020) born in Rociada, folk musician and composer
- Margaret Larkin (1899–1967), born in Las Vegas, writer and musician
- María Dolores Gonzáles (1917–1975), leader in bilingual education in New Mexico

== Politics ==
San Miguel County has traditionally been heavily Democratic. The last time it voted Republican for president was 1956, and from 1992 to 2020 no Republican cracked 30% of the vote. Donald Trump broke through this particular record in 2024, when he carried 34.99% of the vote; his performance in the county was the best by a Republican presidential candidate since Reagan in 1984.

United States presidential election results for San Miguel County, New Mexico
Year	Republican		Democratic		Third party(ies)	
Year	No.	%	No.	%	No.	%
1912	2,479	55.67%	1,740	39.07%	234	5.25%
1916	2,932	56.37%	2,231	42.90%	38	0.73%
1920	5,535	58.11%	3,990	41.89%	0	0.00%
1924	3,894	50.56%	3,543	46.00%	265	3.44%
1928	5,184	59.26%	3,560	40.70%	4	0.05%
1932	5,364	51.28%	5,076	48.53%	20	0.19%
1936	4,697	43.07%	6,199	56.84%	10	0.09%
1940	4,882	44.61%	6,054	55.32%	7	0.06%
1944	4,014	46.13%	4,684	53.83%	4	0.05%
1948	4,655	48.34%	4,953	51.44%	21	0.22%
1952	5,360	54.59%	4,451	45.34%	7	0.07%
1956	5,083	55.86%	4,014	44.11%	3	0.03%
1960	3,988	41.92%	5,520	58.02%	6	0.06%
1964	2,714	31.91%	5,767	67.81%	24	0.28%
1968	4,027	48.12%	4,088	48.85%	253	3.02%
1972	4,434	47.71%	4,663	50.18%	196	2.11%
1976	3,162	37.17%	5,204	61.17%	141	1.66%
1980	3,292	39.34%	4,514	53.94%	563	6.73%
1984	3,485	39.38%	5,227	59.06%	138	1.56%
1988	2,763	30.62%	6,131	67.95%	129	1.43%
1992	2,183	23.26%	6,186	65.90%	1,018	10.84%
1996	1,938	20.09%	6,995	72.51%	714	7.40%
2000	2,215	24.18%	6,540	71.39%	406	4.43%
2004	3,313	27.34%	8,683	71.67%	120	0.99%
2008	2,478	19.15%	10,320	79.75%	143	1.11%
2012	2,303	20.01%	8,850	76.90%	356	3.09%
2016	2,313	21.51%	7,285	67.76%	1,153	10.72%
2020	3,421	29.67%	7,888	68.41%	222	1.93%
2024	3,887	34.99%	6,985	62.88%	236	2.12%

== Transportation ==
=== Major highways ===
- I-25 / US 85 (unsigned)
  - I-25 BL (Las Vegas)
- US 84
- US 285
- NM 3
- NM 34
- NM 50
- NM 63
- NM 65
- NM 94
- NM 104
- NM 105
- NM 129
- NM 223
- NM 250
- NM 266
- NM 276
- NM 281
- NM 283
- NM 329
- NM 386
- NM 419
- NM 432
- NM 433
- NM 451
- NM 518

== See also ==
- Baca land grants
- Las Gorras Blancas
- National Register of Historic Places listings in San Miguel County, New Mexico
- San Miguel del Vado Land Grant
