= 1936 United States presidential election in New Mexico =

- November 3, 1936

Nominee	Franklin D. Roosevelt	Alf Landon
Party	Democratic	Republican
Home state	New York	Kansas
Running mate	John N. Garner	Frank Knox
Electoral vote	3	0
Popular vote	106,037	61,727
Percentage	62.69%	36.50%
County results
Roosevelt
50–60%
60–70%
70–80%
80–90%
Landon
50–60%

The 1936 United States presidential election in New Mexico took place on November 3, 1936. All contemporary forty-eight states were part of the 1936 United States presidential election. State voters chose three electors to represent them in the Electoral College, which voted for President and Vice President.

New Mexico was won by incumbent President Franklin D. Roosevelt in a 26-point landslide against Kansas Governor Alf Landon. Roosevelt won every county in the state save Socorro County, which he lost by only 53 votes. Roosevelt was the first Democrat to ever carry San Miguel County and Valencia County, although this was the only occasion between statehood (in 1911) and 1960 that Valencia County backed a Democrat. This election is the last time a Democrat has carried Lincoln County and San Juan County has only backed a Democrat once (in 1964) since this election.

Union Party candidate William Lemke won 924 votes, 0.5 percent of the state's total.

== Results ==
General Election Results
Party	Pledged to	Elector	Votes
Democratic Party	Franklin D. Roosevelt	Clyde Woolworth	106,037
Democratic Party	Franklin D. Roosevelt	Amelia Velarde	105,848
Democratic Party	Franklin D. Roosevelt	V. V. Tafoya	105,650
Republican Party	Alfred M. Landon	W. C. Porterfield	61,727
Republican Party	Alfred M. Landon	Jose C. Rivera	61,717
Republican Party	Alfred M. Landon	Mrs. Ed A. Cahoon	61,688
Union Party	William Lemke	A. W. Cameron	924
Union Party	William Lemke	Paul Eminger	916
Union Party	William Lemke	J. D. Page	910
Socialist Party	Norman Thomas	C. C. Blackburn	343
Socialist Party	Norman Thomas	John Williams	340
Socialist Party	Norman Thomas	H. S. Duncan	335
Prohibition Party	D. Leigh Colvin	H. D. Wright	62
Prohibition Party	D. Leigh Colvin	C. O. Mardorf	60
Prohibition Party	D. Leigh Colvin	S. P. Crouch	59
Communist Party	Earl Browder	I. Pacheco	43
Communist Party	Earl Browder	L. B. Good	38
Communist Party	Earl Browder	D. Hernandez	36
Votes cast (Note: Based on totals for highest elector on each ticket)			169,135

=== Results by county ===
County	Franklin D. Roosevelt Democratic		Alf Landon Republican		William Lemke Union		Norman Thomas Socialist		D. Leigh Colvin Prohibition		Earl Browder Communist		Margin		Total votes cast (Note: Based on the highest elector on each ticket)
County	#	%	#	%	#	%	#	%	#	%	#	%	#	%	Total votes cast
Bernalillo	15,305	67.78%	7,107	31.47%	106	0.47%	49	0.22%	9	0.04%	6	0.03%	8,198	36.30%	22,582
Catron	1,456	64.08%	798	35.12%	9	0.40%	6	0.26%	0	0.00%	3	0.13%	658	28.96%	2,272
Chaves	4,394	62.62%	2,505	35.70%	84	1.20%	19	0.27%	13	0.19%	2	0.03%	1,889	26.92%	7,017
Colfax	4,661	62.56%	2,745	36.84%	32	0.43%	10	0.13%	2	0.03%	1	0.01%	19,16	25.71%	7,451
Curry	4,689	80.89%	1,023	17.65%	37	0.64%	39	0.67%	1	0.02%	8	0.14%	3,666	63.24%	5,797
De Baca	1,010	69.18%	444	30.41%	1	0.07%	5	0.34%	0	0.00%	0	0.00%	566	38.77%	1,460
Doña Ana	5,544	68.43%	2,494	30.78%	41	0.51%	17	0.21%	4	0.05%	2	0.02%	3,050	37.65%	8,102
Eddy	4,349	80.17%	1,027	18.93%	29	0.53%	18	0.33%	1	0.02%	1	0.02%	3,322	61.24%	5,425
Grant	3,215	67.88%	1,469	31.02%	38	0.80%	10	0.21%	3	0.06%	1	0.02%	1,746	36.87%	4,736
Guadalupe	2,187	55.14%	1,775	44.76%	3	0.08%	1	0.03%	0	0.00%	0	0.00%	412	10.39%	3,966
Harding	1,276	58.83%	888	40.94%	0	0.00%	5	0.23%	1	0.05%	0	0.00%	388	17.89%	2,169
Hidalgo	1,115	76.42%	326	22.34%	13	0.89%	5	0.34%	0	0.00%	0	0.00%	789	54.08%	1,459
Lea	3,905	86.95%	549	12.22%	18	0.40%	14	0.31%	2	0.04%	3	0.07%	3,356	74.73%	4,491
Lincoln	2,021	55.51%	1,579	43.37%	30	0.82%	10	0.27%	1	0.03%	0	0.00%	442	12.14%	3,641
Luna	1,500	63.37%	806	34.05%	52	2.20%	6	0.25%	1	0.04%	2	0.08%	694	29.32%	2,367
McKinley	2,526	64.05%	1,404	35.60%	5	0.13%	5	0.13%	1	0.03%	3	0.08%	1,122	28.45%	3,944
Mora	2,460	52.06%	2,259	47.81%	4	0.08%	2	0.04%	0	0.00%	0	0.00%	201	4.25%	4,725
Otero	1,989	59.28%	1,333	39.73%	23	0.69%	8	0.24%	2	0.06%	0	0.00%	656	19.55%	3,355
Quay	3,423	79.79%	816	19.02%	38	0.89%	10	0.23%	2	0.05%	1	0.02%	2,607	60.77%	4,290
Rio Arriba	4,691	53.29%	4,093	46.50%	11	0.12%	5	0.06%	0	0.00%	2	0.02%	598	6.79%	8,802
Roosevelt	2,951	76.55%	677	17.56%	193	5.01%	24	0.62%	8	0.21%	2	0.05%	2,274	58.99%	3,855
San Juan	1,530	51.97%	1,345	45.69%	48	1.63%	14	0.48%	5	0.17%	2	0.07%	185	6.28%	2,944
San Miguel	6,199	56.84%	4,697	43.07%	5	0.05%	5	0.05%	0	0.00%	0	0.00%	1,502	13.77%	10,906
Sandoval	2,094	53.72%	1,800	46.18%	2	0.05%	2	0.05%	0	0.00%	0	0.00%	294	7.54%	3,898
Santa Fe	6,145	55.20%	4,960	44.56%	12	0.11%	12	0.11%	1	0.01%	2	0.02%	1,185	10.64%	11,132
Sierra	1,587	61.94%	951	37.12%	16	0.62%	3	0.12%	5	0.20%	0	0.00%	636	24.82%	2,562
Socorro	2,477	49.31%	2,530	50.37%	7	0.14%	9	0.18%	0	0.00%	0	0.00%	-53	-1.06%	5,023
Taos	3,051	51.03%	2,918	48.80%	7	0.12%	3	0.05%	0	0.00%	0	0.00%	133	2.22%	5,979
Torrance	2,346	55.50%	1,843	43.60%	27	0.64%	9	0.21%	0	0.00%	2	0.05%	503	11.90%	4,227
Union	2,605	61.05%	1,625	38.08%	29	0.68%	8	0.19%	0	0.00%	0	0.00%	980	22.97%	4,267
Valencia	3,336	53.03%	2,941	46.75%	4	0.06%	10	0.16%	0	0.00%	0	0.00%	395	6.28%	6,291
Total	106,037	62.69%	61,727	36.50%	924	0.55%	343	0.20%	62	0.04%	43	0.03%	44,310	26.20%	169,135

==== Counties that flipped from Republican to Democratic ====
- San Miguel
- Valencia

==== Counties that flipped from Democratic to Republican ====
- Socorro
