= Roy, New Mexico =

- Village
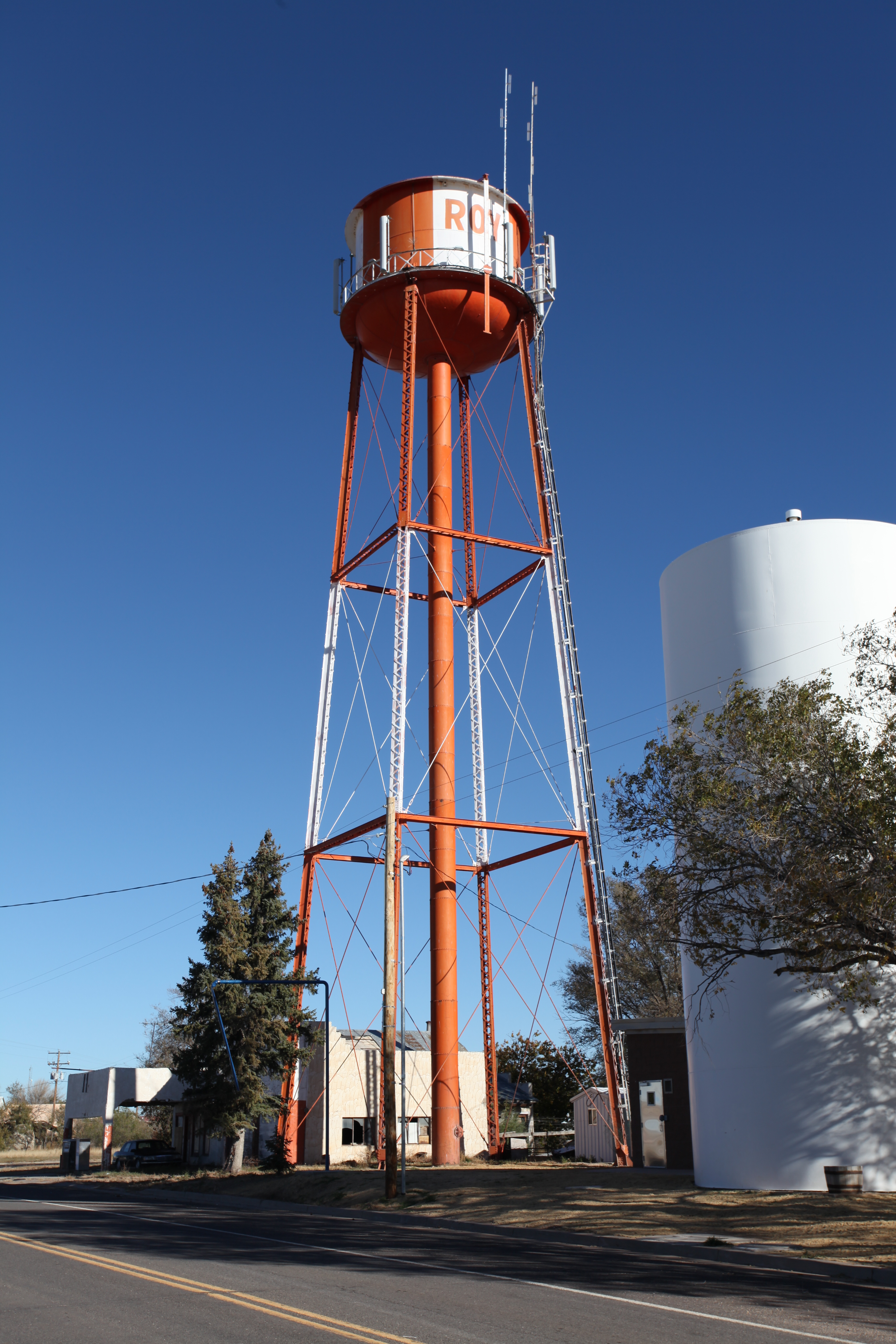

- Location of Roy, New Mexico

- Location in the United States
- Coordinates: 35°56′38″N 104°11′35″W
- Country: United States
- State: New Mexico
- County: Harding

Area
  - Total: 2.04 sq mi (5.29 km^{2})
  - Land: 2.04 sq mi (5.29 km^{2})
  - Water: 0 sq mi (0.00 km^{2})
- Elevation: 5,896 ft (1,797 m)

Population (2020)
  - Total: 193
  - Density: 94.4/sq mi (36.46/km^{2})
- Time zone: UTC-07:00 (MST)
  - Summer (DST): UTC-06:00 (MDT)
- ZIP code: 87743
- Area code: 575
- FIPS code: 35-65070
- GNIS feature ID: 0894203
- Website: villageofroy.org

Roy is a village in Harding County, New Mexico, United States. The population was 192 in the 2020 census.

== Geography ==
Roy is located at 35°56′38″N 104°11′35″W (35.943890, -104.193025).

According to the United States Census Bureau, the village has a total area of 2.0 square miles (5.2 km^{2}), all land.

The city is located off of New Mexico State Road 39, in the northeastern plains region of New Mexico.

== History ==
The village, originally 2 miles (3.2 km) west of its current site, was founded by ranchers Frank and William Roy, and named for Frank as the first postmaster in 1901. It was relocated after the Dawson Railway was built from Tucumcari through the area in 1902, on its way to coal fields at Dawson. Roy was incorporated in 1916, in what was then Mora County. The railroad was removed after 1950. This led to a significant decline in economic activity in Roy, and the village has been declining for nearly 70 years. The village's historical size can be seen in the more than 40 city blocks that make up Roy.

Climate

Climate data for Roy, New Mexico (1991–2020)
| Month | Jan | Feb | Mar | Apr | May | Jun | Jul | Aug | Sep | Oct | Nov | Dec | Year |
|---|---|---|---|---|---|---|---|---|---|---|---|---|---|
| Mean daily maximum °F (°C) | 48.4 (9.1) | 51.9 (11.1) | 59.1 (15.1) | 66.2 (19.0) | 75.9 (24.4) | 85.0 (29.4) | 87.6 (30.9) | 85.3 (29.6) | 79.1 (26.2) | 69.1 (20.6) | 57.2 (14.0) | 47.4 (8.6) | 67.7 (19.8) |
| Daily mean °F (°C) | 34.4 (1.3) | 37.2 (2.9) | 43.7 (6.5) | 50.4 (10.2) | 60.5 (15.8) | 69.3 (20.7) | 72.8 (22.7) | 71.2 (21.8) | 65.0 (18.3) | 53.5 (11.9) | 42.5 (5.8) | 34.4 (1.3) | 52.9 (11.6) |
| Mean daily minimum °F (°C) | 20.5 (−6.4) | 22.5 (−5.3) | 28.3 (−2.1) | 34.6 (1.4) | 45.0 (7.2) | 53.6 (12.0) | 58.1 (14.5) | 57.1 (13.9) | 50.9 (10.5) | 37.9 (3.3) | 27.9 (−2.3) | 21.3 (−5.9) | 38.1 (3.4) |
| Average precipitation inches (mm) | 0.61 (15) | 0.50 (13) | 0.78 (20) | 0.87 (22) | 1.28 (33) | 2.10 (53) | 3.08 (78) | 3.30 (84) | 1.85 (47) | 1.06 (27) | 0.37 (9.4) | 0.55 (14) | 16.35 (415.4) |
| Average snowfall inches (cm) | 4.5 (11) | 3.0 (7.6) | 4.4 (11) | 0.5 (1.3) | 0.2 (0.51) | 0.0 (0.0) | 0.0 (0.0) | 0.0 (0.0) | 0.0 (0.0) | 0.2 (0.51) | 2.1 (5.3) | 4.4 (11) | 19.3 (48.22) |
Source: NOAA

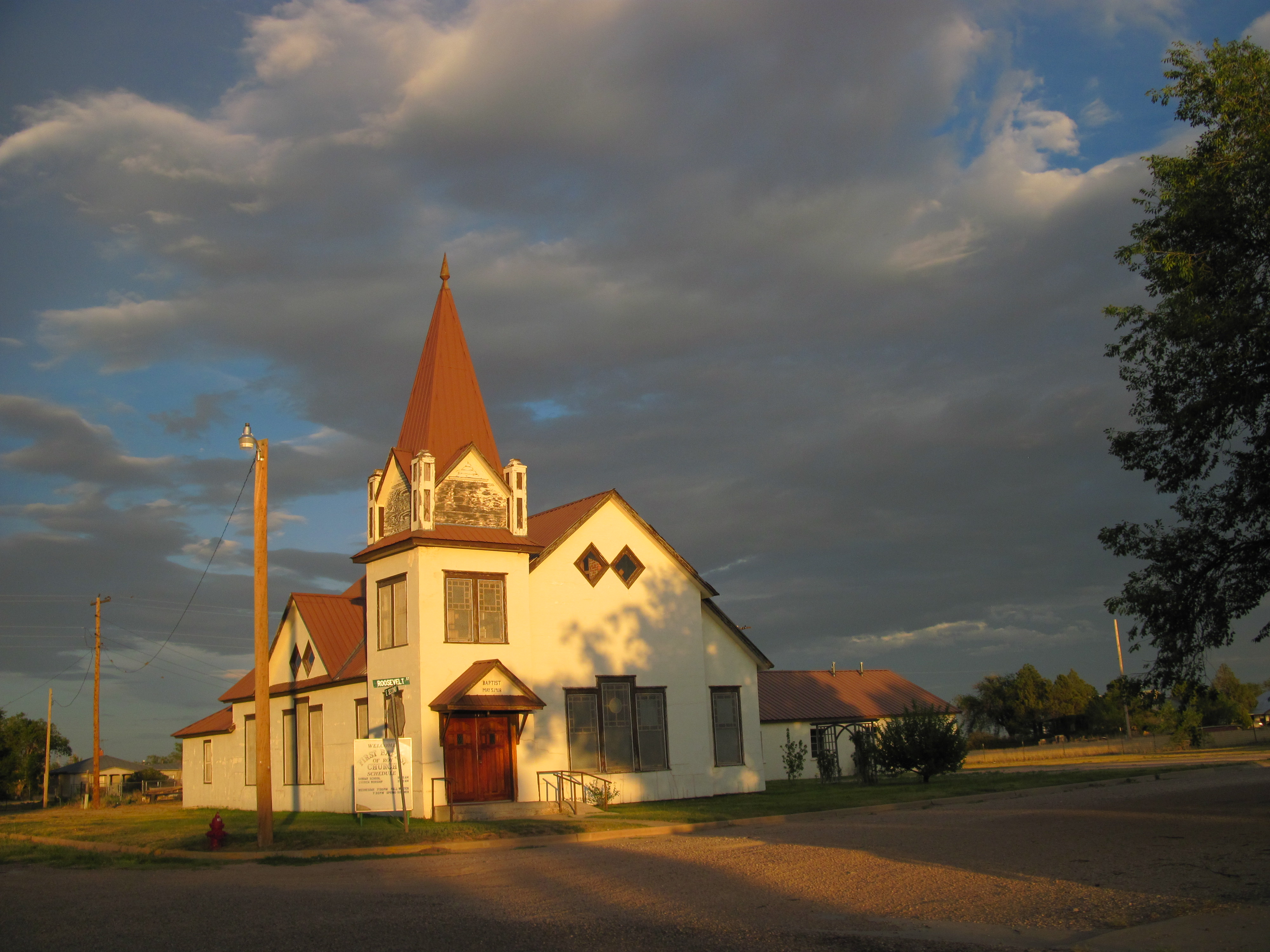
First Baptist Church on Roosevelt St., Roy, New Mexico

== Demographics ==
Historical population
| Census | Pop. | Note | %± |
|---|---|---|---|
| 1920 | 564 | | — |
| 1930 | 713 | | 26.4% |
| 1940 | 1,138 | | 59.6% |
| 1950 | 1,074 | | −5.6% |
| 1960 | 633 | | −41.1% |
| 1970 | 476 | | −24.8% |
| 1980 | 381 | | −20.0% |
| 1990 | 362 | | −5.0% |
| 2000 | 304 | | −16.0% |
| 2010 | 234 | | −23.0% |
| 2020 | 193 | | −17.5% |
U.S. Decennial Census

=== 2000 Census ===
As of the census of 2000, there were 304 people, 150 households, and 88 families residing in the village. The population density was 148.8 inhabitants per square mile (57.5/km^{2}). There were 206 housing units at an average density of 100.8 per square mile (38.9/km^{2}). The racial makeup of the village was 83.22% White, 1.97% Native American, 12.17% from other races, and 2.63% from two or more races. Hispanic or Latino of any race were 52.63% of the population.

There were 150 households, out of which 20.0% had children under the age of 18 living with them, 45.3% were married couples living together, 10.0% had a female householder with no husband present, and 41.3% were non-families. 38.0% of all households were made up of individuals, and 24.0% had someone living alone who was 65 years of age or older. The average household size was 2.03 and the average family size was 2.67.

In the village, the population was spread out, with 17.8% under the age of 18, 5.3% from 18 to 24, 15.1% from 25 to 44, 27.3% from 45 to 64, and 34.5% who were 65 years of age or older. The median age was 52 years. For every 100 females, there were 96.1 males. For every 100 females age 18 and over, there were 98.4 males.

The median income for a household in the village was $21,111, and the median income for a family was $41,667. Males had a median income of $31,250 versus $20,179 for females. The per capita income for the village was $17,651. About 11.7% of families and 15.2% of the population were below the poverty line, including 25.0% of those under the age of eighteen and 13.7% of those 65 or over.

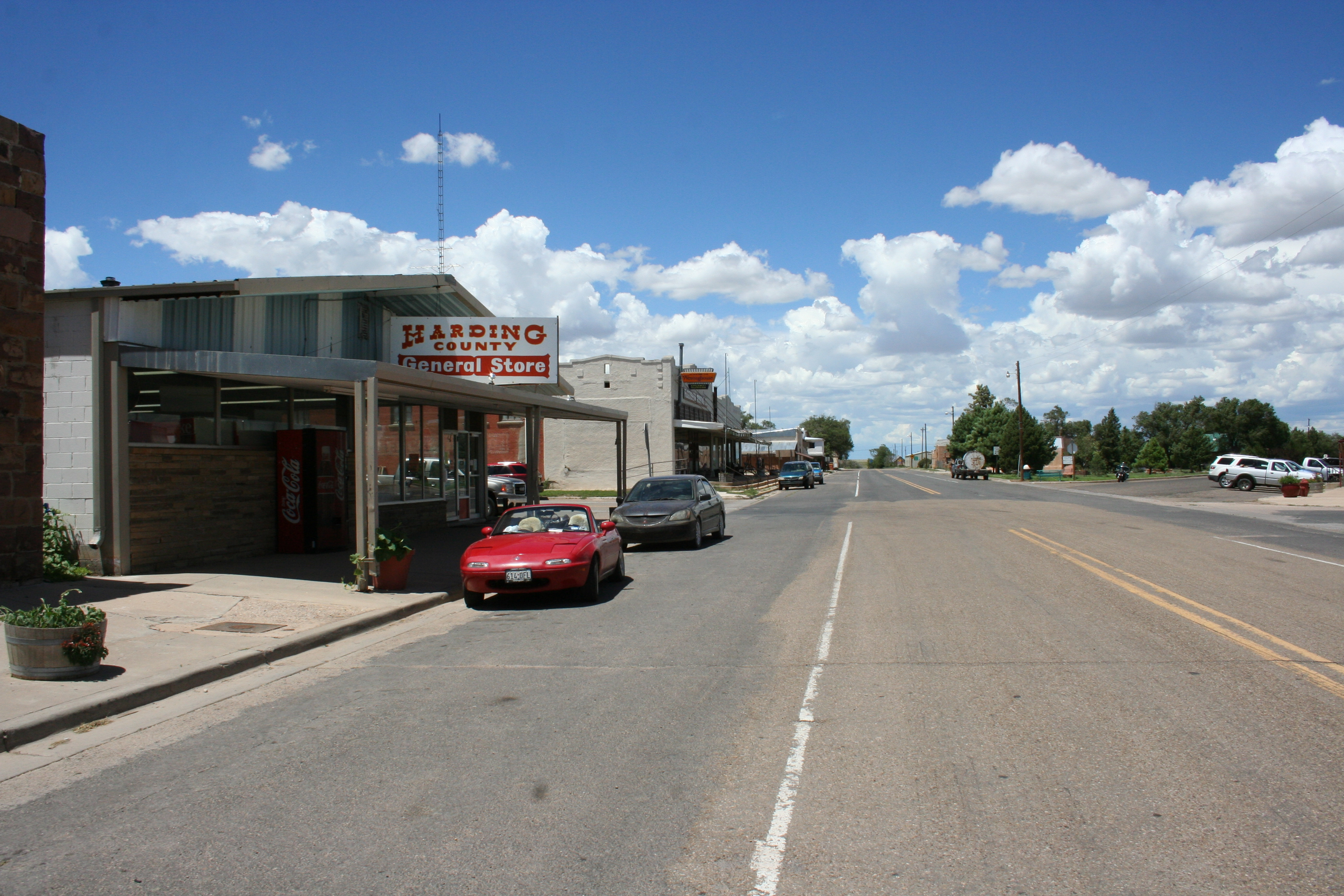
View down Richelieu Street, Roy's Main Street.

== In popular culture and mass media ==
Roy was a filming location in the 2009 comedy film Did You Hear About the Morgans?.

== Notable people ==
- Tommy McDonald, professional football player (NFL wide receiver)
- Bob Wills, resident as a young man.
