= Elections in New Mexico =

Elections in the U.S. state of New Mexico are held regularly.

In a 2020 study, New Mexico was ranked as the 20th hardest state for citizens to vote in.

== Presidential elections ==
New Mexico takes part in United States presidential elections. New Mexico has 5 electoral votes. The state has voted for the national winner all but four times since statehood in 1912: in 1976, 2000, 2016 and 2024.

United States presidential election results for New Mexico
Year	Republican		Democratic		Third party(ies)	
Year	No.	%	No.	%	No.	%
1912	17,733	35.91%	20,437	41.39%	11,206	22.70%
1916	31,152	46.64%	33,527	50.20%	2,108	3.16%
1920	57,634	54.68%	46,668	44.27%	1,104	1.05%
1924	54,745	48.52%	48,542	43.02%	9,543	8.46%
1928	69,645	59.01%	48,211	40.85%	158	0.13%
1932	54,217	35.76%	95,089	62.72%	2,300	1.52%
1936	61,727	36.50%	106,037	62.69%	1,372	0.81%
1940	79,315	43.28%	103,699	56.59%	244	0.13%
1944	70,688	46.44%	81,389	53.47%	148	0.10%
1948	80,303	42.93%	105,464	56.38%	1,296	0.69%
1952	132,170	55.39%	105,661	44.28%	777	0.33%
1956	146,788	57.81%	106,098	41.78%	1,040	0.41%
1960	153,733	49.41%	156,027	50.15%	1,347	0.43%
1964	131,838	40.24%	194,017	59.22%	1,760	0.54%
1968	169,692	51.85%	130,081	39.75%	27,508	8.41%
1972	235,606	61.05%	141,084	36.56%	9,241	2.39%
1976	211,419	50.75%	201,148	48.28%	4,023	0.97%
1980	250,779	54.97%	167,826	36.78%	37,632	8.25%
1984	307,101	59.70%	201,769	39.23%	5,500	1.07%
1988	270,341	51.86%	244,497	46.90%	6,449	1.24%
1992	212,824	37.34%	261,617	45.90%	95,545	16.76%
1996	232,751	41.86%	273,495	49.18%	49,828	8.96%
2000	286,417	47.85%	286,783	47.91%	25,405	4.24%
2004	376,930	49.84%	370,942	49.05%	8,432	1.11%
2008	346,832	41.78%	472,422	56.91%	10,904	1.31%
2012	335,788	42.84%	415,335	52.99%	32,634	4.16%
2016	319,667	40.04%	385,234	48.26%	93,418	11.70%
2020	401,894	43.50%	501,614	54.29%	20,457	2.21%
2024	423,391	45.85%	478,802	51.85%	21,210	2.30%

== Senate elections ==
- 2020 United States Senate election in New Mexico
- 2018 United States Senate election in New Mexico
- 2014 United States Senate election in New Mexico
- 2012 United States Senate election in New Mexico
- 2008 United States Senate election in New Mexico

== Gubernatorial election ==
- 2022 New Mexico gubernatorial election
- 2018 New Mexico gubernatorial election
- 2014 New Mexico gubernatorial election
- 2010 New Mexico gubernatorial election
- 2006 New Mexico gubernatorial election
- 2002 New Mexico gubernatorial election

== See also ==
- United States presidential elections in New Mexico
- Women's suffrage in New Mexico
