= United States presidential elections in New Mexico =

Presidential elections in New Mexico
- Number of elections: 29
- Voted Democratic: 17
- Voted Republican: 12
- Voted other: 0
- Voted for winning candidate: 25
- Voted for losing candidate: 4

Since New Mexico's admission to the Union in January 1912, it has participated in 29 United States presidential elections.

In the state's first presidential election, in 1912, Theodore Roosevelt, the Progressive Party's nominee, received the highest vote share (17.1%) ever won by a third-party candidate in New Mexico. The largest margin of victory in a presidential election in New Mexico's history was in 1932, when Democrat Franklin D. Roosevelt defeated Republican Herbert Hoover by 26.96%. The narrowest margin of victory was in 2000 presidential election, when Democrat Al Gore defeated Republican George W. Bush by a margin of just 0.06% (366 votes).

Up to the 2024 presidential election, New Mexico has been a leading indicator of election trends with a success rate of 86.2%; the winner in New Mexico has won the presidency 25 out of 29 times, except in the 1976, 2000, 2016, 2024 presidential elections. New Mexico has aligned with the national popular vote in every election except 1976 and 2024 since its admission to the union.

New Mexico is a signatory of the National Popular Vote Interstate Compact, an interstate compact in which signatories award all of their electoral votes to the winner of the national-level popular vote in a presidential election, even if another candidate won an individual signatory's popular vote. As of 2021, it has not yet gone into force.

== Presidential elections ==
Key for parties
American Independent Party – (AI)
Communist Party USA – (CPUSA)
Constitution Party – (C)
Democratic Party – (D)
Dixiecrat Party – (DI)
Farmer–Labor Party – (FL)
Green Party – (G)
Independent candidate – (I)
Libertarian Party – (LI)
Prohibition Party – (PRO)
Progressive Party (1912) – (PR-1912)
Progressive Party (1924) – (PR-1924)
Reform Party – (RE)
Republican Party – (R)
Socialist Party of America – (S)
Socialist Labor Party of America – (SLP)
Socialist Workers Party – (SWP)
Union Party – (U)

Note – A double dagger (‡) indicates the national winner.

Presidential elections in New Mexico from 1912 to present
Year	Winner			Runner-up			Other candidate (Note: For purposes of these lists, other candidates are defined as those who were in third place in New Mexico.)			EV	Ref.
Year	Candidate	Votes	%	Candidate	Votes	%	Candidate	Votes	%	EV	Ref.
1912	Woodrow Wilson (D)‡	20,437	41.87%	William Howard Taft (R)	17,164	35.17%	Theodore Roosevelt (PR-1912)	8,347	17.10%	3	
1916	Woodrow Wilson (D)‡	33,693	50.38%	Charles Evans Hughes (R)	31,097	46.50%	Allan L. Benson (S)	1,977	2.96%	3	
1920	Warren G. Harding (R) ‡	57,634	54.67%	James M. Cox (D)	46,668	44.27%	Parley P. Christensen (FL)	1,104	1.05%	3	
1924	Calvin Coolidge (R) ‡	54,745	48.52%	John W. Davis (D)	48,542	43.02%	Robert M. La Follette (PR-1924)	9,543	8.46%	3	
1928	Herbert Hoover (R)‡	69,708	59.04%	Al Smith (D)	48,211	40.83%	William Z. Foster (CPUSA)	158	0.13%	3	
1932	Franklin D. Roosevelt (D)‡	95,089	62.72%	Herbert Hoover (R)	54,217	35.76%	Norman Thomas (S)	1,776	1.17%	3	
1936	Franklin D. Roosevelt (D)‡	106,037	62.69%	Alf Landon (R)	61,727	36.50%	William Lemke (U)	924	0.55%	3	
1940	Franklin D. Roosevelt (D)‡	103,699	56.59%	Wendell Willkie (R)	79,315	43.28%	Norman Thomas (S)	144	0.08%	3	
1944	Franklin D. Roosevelt (D)‡	81,389	53.47%	Thomas E. Dewey (R)	70,688	46.44%	Claude A. Watson (PRO)	148	0.10%	4	
1948	Harry S. Truman (D) ‡	105,464	56.38%	Thomas E. Dewey (R)	80,303	42.93%	Strom Thurmond (DI)	1,037	0.55%	4	
1952	Dwight D. Eisenhower (R) ‡	132,170	55.39%	Adlai Stevenson (D)	105,661	44.28%	Stuart Hamblen (PRO)	297	0.12%	4	
1956	Dwight D. Eisenhower (R) ‡	146,788	57.81%	Adlai Stevenson (D)	106,098	41.78%	T. Coleman Andrews (C)	364	0.14%	4	
1960	John F. Kennedy (D) ‡	156,027	50.15%	Richard Nixon (R)	153,733	49.41%	Eric Hass (SLP)	570	0.18%	4	
1964	Lyndon B. Johnson (D) ‡	194,015	59.03%	Barry Goldwater (R)	131,838	40.12%	Eric Hass (SLP)	1,217	0.37%	4	
1968	Richard Nixon (R) ‡	169,692	51.84%	Hubert Humphrey (D)	130,081	39.74%	George Wallace (AI)	25,737	7.86%	4	
1972	Richard Nixon (R) ‡	235,606	61.00%	George McGovern (D)	141,084	36.53%	John G. Schmitz (AI)	8,767	2.27%	4	
1976	Gerald Ford (R)	211,419	50.53%	Jimmy Carter (D) ‡	201,148	48.07%	Peter Camejo (SWP)	2,462	0.59%	4	
1980	Ronald Reagan (R) ‡	250,779	54.88%	Jimmy Carter (D)	167,826	36.73%	John B. Anderson (I)	29,459	6.45%	4	
1984	Ronald Reagan (R) ‡	307,101	59.70%	Walter Mondale (D)	201,769	39.23%	David Bergland (LI)	4,459	0.87%	5	
1988	George H. W. Bush (R) ‡	270,341	51.86%	Michael Dukakis (D)	244,497	46.90%	Ron Paul (LI)	3,268	0.63%	5	
1992	Bill Clinton (D) ‡	261,617	45.90%	George H. W. Bush (R)	212,824	37.34%	Ross Perot (I)	91,895	16.12%	5	
1996	Bill Clinton (D) ‡	273,495	49.18%	Bob Dole (R)	232,751	41.86%	Ross Perot (RE)	32,257	5.80%	5	
2000	Al Gore (D)	286,783	47.91%	George W. Bush (R) ‡	286,417	47.85%	Ralph Nader (G)	21,251	3.55%	5	
2004	George W. Bush (R)‡	376,930	49.84%	John Kerry (D)	370,942	49.05%	Ralph Nader (I)	4,053	0.54%	5	
2008	Barack Obama (D)‡	472,422	56.91%	John McCain (R)	346,832	41.78%	Ralph Nader (I)	5,327	0.64%	5	
2012	Barack Obama (D)‡	415,335	52.99%	Mitt Romney (R)	335,788	42.84%	Gary Johnson (LI)	27,788	3.55%	5	
2016	Hillary Clinton (D)	385,234	48.26%	Donald Trump (R)‡	319,667	40.04%	Gary Johnson (LI)	74,541	9.34%	5	
2020	Joe Biden (D)‡	501,614	54.29%	Donald Trump (R)	401,894	43.50%	Jo Jorgensen (LI)	12,585	1.36%	5	
2024	Kamala Harris (D)	478,802	51.85%	Donald Trump (R)‡	423,391	45.85%	Robert F. Kennedy Jr. (I)	9,553	1.03%	5	

=== Graph ===
The following graph shows the margin of victory of the Democratic and Republican Parties in the 28 presidential elections New Mexico participated. Value above the origin point on the Y-axis indicated Democratic Party's margin of victory; values below the origin point indicates Republican Party's margin of victory.

View source data.

== See also ==
- Elections in New Mexico
- List of United States presidential election results by state

== Works cited ==
- Guide to U.S. Elections. SAGE Publications. 2010. ISBN 978-1-60426-536-1.
- Presidential elections, 1789–1996. Congressional Quarterly. 1997. ISBN 978-1-56802-065-5. LCCN 97019084. OL 673017M.
