= 1928 United States presidential election in New Mexico =

- November 6, 1928

Nominee	Herbert Hoover	Al Smith
Party	Republican	Democratic
Home state	California	New York
Running mate	Charles Curtis	Joseph T. Robinson
Electoral vote	3	0
Popular vote	69,645	48,211
Percentage	59.01%	40.85%
County results
Hoover
50–60%
60–70%
70–80%
Smith
50–60%
President before election
Calvin Coolidge
Republican
Elected President
Herbert Hoover
Republican

The 1928 United States presidential election in New Mexico took place on November 6, 1928. All contemporary forty-eight states were part of the 1928 United States presidential election. State voters chose three electors to represent them in the Electoral College, who voted for president and vice president.

New Mexico had in its early history as a state shown itself, like all of the West at the time, to be very much a swing state, having backed Woodrow Wilson twice in 1912 and 1916 and then backed Warren G. Harding and Calvin Coolidge in their landslide 1920 and 1924 victories. During this era – and indeed since the 1870s – New Mexico was divided between largely Republican machine-run highland regions and its firmly Southern Democrat Baptist "Little Texas" region in its east.

However, the nomination of Catholic Al Smith on the first ballot after almost all other Democrats sat the election out challenged the status quo. Fear ensued in the South, which had no experience of the Southern and Eastern European Catholic immigrants who were Smith's local constituency. Southern fundamentalist Protestants believed that Smith would allow papal and priestly leadership in the United States, which Protestantism was a reaction against. At the same time, there existed potential for a pro-Catholic swing in the traditional GOP Spanish-American mountain counties of the North. Polls in July regarded New Mexico as "doubtful", although these had taken little account of the religious issues that were to dominate the election.

New Mexico was won by former Secretary of Commerce Herbert Hoover over New York Governor Al Smith in an 18-point landslide. In traditionally fiercely Democratic "Little Texas", anti-Catholic prejudice was identical to that which turned Texas and Oklahoma to Hoover and Smith retained just one of the eleven counties that had voted for John W. Davis in 1924. In the mountain counties of traditional Republican strength, by contrast, Hoover's losses proved minor, as the Catholic Hispanic areas could not identify with the urban New Yorker Smith.

At this time the Republican Party was widely associated in the minds of many Americans with the economic success of the mid-1920s, although the post-Civil War Democratic stronghold in the Deep South was still evident by the time of this election.

After this election, New Mexico would not vote for a Republican again until 1952. Herbert Hoover was the last Republican to win Grant County until Richard Nixon in 1972 and the last Republican to win Eddy County and Lea County until 1968. Additionally, McKinley County and Rio Arriba County would not vote Republican again until 1956. Hoover was the only Republican between New Mexico's statehood in 1911 and 1952 to carry Chaves County, Curry County, Hidalgo County, Quay County, and Roosevelt County.

== Results ==
General Election Results
Party	Pledged to	Elector	Votes
Republican Party	Herbert Hoover	Thomas D. Burns Jr.	69,645
Republican Party	Herbert Hoover	Gretchen Lyon	69,616
Republican Party	Herbert Hoover	Jose Gonzales	69,592
Democratic Party	Al Smith	Mrs. A. A. Jones	48,211
Democratic Party	Al Smith	Robert W. Isaacs	48,048
Democratic Party	Al Smith	Emmett Wirt	48,025
Workers Party	William Z. Foster	John W. Blackburn	158
Workers Party	William Z. Foster	C. M. Calkins	156
Workers Party	William Z. Foster	L. R. Graces	153
Votes cast (Note: Based on totals for highest elector on each ticket)			118,077

=== Results by county ===
County	Herbert Hoover Republican		Al Smith Democratic		William Z. Foster Workers		Margin		Total votes cast (Note: Based on the highest elector on each ticket)
County	#	%	#	%	#	%	#	%	Total votes cast
Bernalillo	8,725	56.99%	6,572	42.92%	14	0.09%	2,153	14.06%	15,311
Catron	774	64.77%	420	35.15%	1	0.08%	354	29.62%	1,195
Chaves	3,124	69.48%	1,364	30.34%	8	0.18%	1,760	39.15%	4,496
Colfax	3,904	56.29%	3,022	43.57%	10	0.14%	882	12.72%	6,936
Curry	1,968	56.16%	1,530	43.66%	6	0.17%	438	12.50%	3,504
De Baca	474	47.83%	514	51.87%	3	0.30%	-40	-4.04%	991
Doña Ana	3,141	59.06%	2,169	40.79%	8	0.15%	972	18.28%	5,318
Eddy	1,618	57.11%	1,212	42.78%	3	0.11%	406	14.33%	2,833
Grant	2,058	50.69%	1,994	49.11%	8	0.20%	64	1.58%	4,060
Guadalupe	1,718	61.12%	1,093	38.88%	0	0.00%	625	22.23%	2,811
Harding	916	55.72%	726	44.16%	2	0.12%	190	11.56%	1,644
Hidalgo	561	52.38%	509	47.53%	1	0.09%	52	4.86%	1,071
Lea	537	52.96%	474	46.75%	3	0.30%	63	6.21%	1,014
Lincoln	1,489	64.32%	821	35.46%	5	0.22%	668	28.86%	2,315
Luna	860	56.80%	647	42.73%	7	0.46%	213	14.07%	1,514
McKinley	2,075	62.22%	1,247	37.39%	13	0.39%	828	24.83%	3,335
Mora	1,998	52.62%	1,799	47.38%	0	0.00%	199	5.24%	3,797
Otero	1,250	51.91%	1,148	47.67%	10	0.42%	102	4.24%	2,408
Quay	1,616	50.26%	1,594	49.58%	5	0.16%	22	0.68%	3,215
Rio Arriba	4,109	62.67%	2,444	37.27%	4	0.06%	1,665	25.39%	6,557
Roosevelt	1,157	51.10%	1,098	48.50%	9	0.40%	59	2.61%	2,264
San Juan	1,436	66.36%	724	33.46%	4	0.18%	712	32.90%	2,164
San Miguel	5,184	59.26%	3,560	40.70%	4	0.05%	1,624	18.56%	8,748
Sandoval	1,700	59.44%	1,159	40.52%	1	0.03%	541	18.92%	2,860
Santa Fe	4,630	60.25%	3,051	39.70%	4	0.05%	1,579	20.55%	7,685
Sierra	766	53.79%	657	46.14%	1	0.07%	109	7.65%	1,424
Socorro	1,940	55.32%	1,564	44.60%	3	0.09%	376	10.72%	3,507
Taos	2,441	56.98%	1,842	43.00%	1	0.02%	599	13.98%	4,284
Torrance	1,958	64.54%	1,070	35.27%	6	0.20%	888	29.27%	3,034
Union	2,018	59.35%	1,306	38.41%	13	0.38%	712	20.94%	3,400
Valencia	3,500	79.87%	881	20.10%	1	0.02%	2,619	59.77%	4,382
Total	69,645	58.98%	48,211	40.83%	158	0.13%	21,434	18.15%	118,077

==== Counties that flipped from Democratic to Republican ====
- Chaves
- Curry
- Eddy
- Grant
- Hidalgo
- Lea
- Otero
- Quay
- Roosevelt
- Union
