= 1960 United States presidential election in New Mexico =

- November 8, 1960

Nominee	John F. Kennedy	Richard Nixon
Party	Democratic	Republican
Home state	Massachusetts	California
Running mate	Lyndon B. Johnson	Henry Cabot Lodge Jr.
Electoral vote	4	0
Popular vote	156,027	153,733
Percentage	50.15%	49.41%
County results
Kennedy
50–60%
60–70%
Nixon
50–60%
60–70%
President before election
Dwight D. Eisenhower
Republican
Elected President
John F. Kennedy
Democratic

The 1960 United States presidential election in New Mexico took place on November 8, 1960. This was the first year where all 50 current states were part of the 1960 United States presidential election. State voters chose four electors to represent them in the Electoral College, who voted for president and vice president.

In its early days New Mexico had been divided between largely Republican machine-run highland regions and its firmly Southern Democrat "Little Texas" region in its east. However, with a shift of these machine-run regions to the Democratic Party, the state became very largely a one-party Democratic state in the years following the New Deal, although Republicans – despite being severely faction-ridden – retained strength in many highland counties. Despite the GOP recapturing the governorship under Edwin L. Mechem in 1950 and retaining it for all but one term up to this point, the state's electorate was overwhelmingly aligned with the Democratic Party.

The nomination by the Democratic Party of a Roman Catholic in Massachusetts Senator John F. Kennedy introduced major complications into likely voting behavior. In 1928, Al Smith had lost most of his party's traditional support in the Baptist "Little Texas" region due to his Catholic faith and Tammany Hall links. However, increasing Mexican-American voting and the power of older Hispanic Catholic voting meant that there was a potential counterweight to this trend, whose power was seen in a wave of anti-Catholic pamphlets in the southeast.

New Mexico was won by Kennedy by a narrow 1-point margin. His narrow win reflected a balancing of Catholic and anti-Catholic forces. In heavily Baptist Roosevelt County, Kennedy declined 15 percent from Adlai Stevenson II's share of the vote in 1956. In contrast, in traditionally Republican Socorro County – the solitary county won by Alf Landon in 1936 – Kennedy won 57 percent of the vote and became the first Democrat to win the county since 1932. Kennedy was also the first Democrat since 1936 to carry Mora County and the first since 1940 to win Santa Fe County. Both counties would become among the most Democratic in the state from the 1970s onwards. It is believed indeed that as many as 98 percent of Hispanic voters may have supported fellow Catholic Kennedy.

In his first bid for the presidency, Republican nominee incumbent Vice President Richard Nixon was defeated in one of the closest elections in American history. Nixon would later win New Mexico in both 1968 and 1972.

== Results ==
1960 United States presidential election in New Mexico
Party	Candidate	Votes	%	±%
Democratic	John F. Kennedy; Lyndon B. Johnson	156,027	50.15%	+8.37
Republican	Richard Nixon; Henry Cabot Lodge Jr.	153,733	49.41%	−8.40
Prohibition	Rutherford Decker; E. Harold Munn	777	0.25%	+0.01
Socialist Labor	Eric Hass; Georgia Cozzini	570	0.18%	+0.15
Total votes		311,107	100.00%	
Democratic win				

=== Results by county ===
County	John F. Kennedy Democratic		Richard Nixon Republican		Various candidates Other parties		Margin		Total votes cast
County	#	%	#	%	#	%	#	%	Total votes cast
Bernalillo	40,908	47.53%	44,805	52.06%	348	0.41%	-3,897	-4.53%	86,061
Catron	573	46.02%	671	53.90%	1	0.08%	-98	-7.88%	1,245
Chaves	6,212	40.36%	9,089	59.05%	91	0.59%	-2,877	-18.69%	15,392
Colfax	3,187	57.65%	2,316	41.90%	25	0.45%	871	15.75%	5,528
Curry	3,421	35.49%	6,153	63.83%	65	0.68%	-2,732	-28.34%	9,639
De Baca	619	45.68%	734	54.17%	2	0.15%	-115	-8.49%	1,355
Dona Ana	8,905	53.15%	7,789	46.49%	61	0.36%	1,116	6.66%	16,755
Eddy	8,707	51.89%	7,986	47.59%	87	0.52%	721	4.30%	16,780
Grant	4,378	63.74%	2,468	35.93%	22	0.33%	1,910	27.81%	6,868
Guadalupe	1,589	56.07%	1,242	43.82%	3	0.11%	347	12.25%	2,834
Harding	396	39.13%	616	60.87%	0	0.00%	-220	-21.74%	1,012
Hidalgo	889	54.11%	750	45.65%	4	0.24%	139	8.46%	1,643
Lea	7,806	50.45%	7,548	48.78%	120	0.77%	258	1.67%	15,474
Lincoln	1,459	41.65%	2,042	58.29%	2	0.06%	-583	-16.64%	3,503
Los Alamos	2,692	50.96%	2,574	48.72%	17	0.32%	118	2.24%	5,283
Luna	1,708	51.66%	1,583	47.88%	15	0.44%	125	3.78%	3,306
McKinley	5,599	56.60%	4,262	43.08%	32	0.32%	1,337	13.52%	9,893
Mora	1,458	51.94%	1,349	48.06%	0	0.00%	109	3.88%	2,807
Otero	4,916	52.15%	4,507	47.81%	3	0.04%	409	4.34%	9,426
Quay	2,050	43.58%	2,652	56.38%	2	0.04%	-602	-12.80%	4,704
Rio Arriba	6,250	62.69%	3,716	37.28%	3	0.03%	2,534	25.41%	9,969
Roosevelt	1,761	30.34%	4,039	69.59%	4	0.07%	-2,278	-39.25%	5,804
San Juan	5,370	40.73%	7,521	57.04%	294	2.23%	-2,151	-16.31%	13,185
San Miguel	5,520	58.02%	3,988	41.92%	6	0.06%	1,532	16.10%	9,514
Sandoval	2,672	64.87%	1,447	35.13%	0	0.00%	1,225	29.74%	4,119
Santa Fe	10,385	58.05%	7,411	41.43%	94	0.52%	2,974	16.62%	17,890
Sierra	1,220	39.14%	1,890	60.64%	7	0.22%	-670	-21.50%	3,117
Socorro	2,327	56.37%	1,796	43.51%	5	0.12%	531	12.86%	4,128
Taos	3,631	58.03%	2,620	41.87%	6	0.10%	1,011	16.16%	6,257
Torrance	1,308	45.35%	1,554	53.88%	22	0.77%	-246	-8.53%	2,884
Union	1,068	38.75%	1,686	61.18%	2	0.07%	-618	-22.43%	2,756
Valencia	7,043	58.81%	4,929	41.16%	4	0.03%	2,114	17.65%	11,976
Totals	156,027	50.15%	153,733	49.41%	1,347	0.44%	2,294	0.74%	311,107

==== Counties that flipped from Republican to Democratic ====
- Colfax
- Doña Ana
- Guadalupe
- Los Alamos
- Hidalgo
- Luna
- McKinley
- Mora
- Otero
- Rio Arriba
- San Miguel
- Sandoval
- Santa Fe
- Socorro
- Valencia
- Taos
