= 1956 United States presidential election in New York =

- November 6, 1956
- Turnout: 67.9% ▼3.3 pp

Nominee	Dwight D. Eisenhower	Adlai Stevenson
Party	Republican	Democratic
Alliance		Liberal
Home state	Pennsylvania (Note: Although he was born in Texas and grew up in Kansas before his military career, at the time of the 1952 election Eisenhower was president of Columbia University and was, officially, a resident of New York. During his first term as president, he moved his private residence to Gettysburg, Pennsylvania, and officially changed his residency to Pennsylvania.)	Illinois
Running mate	Richard Nixon	Estes Kefauver
Electoral vote	45	0
Popular vote	4,340,340	2,750,769
Percentage	61.19%	38.78%
County results
Eisenhower
50–60%
60–70%
70–80%
80–90%
Stevenson
50–60%
President before election
Dwight D. Eisenhower
Republican
Elected President
Dwight D. Eisenhower
Republican

The 1956 United States presidential election in New York took place on November 6, 1956. All contemporary 48 states were part of the 1956 United States presidential election. Voters chose 45 electors to the Electoral College, which selected the president and vice president.

New York was won by incumbent Republican President Dwight D. Eisenhower, who was running against former Democratic Governor of Illinois Adlai Stevenson. Eisenhower ran with incumbent Vice President Richard Nixon, and Stevenson ran with Tennessee Senator, and principal opponent during the 1956 Democratic Primaries, Estes Kefauver. Eisenhower received 61.19% of the vote to Stevenson's 38.78%, a margin of 22.41%. Eisenhower won 4,340,340 votes, the most ever received by a Republican presidential candidate in the state's history.

New York weighed in for this election as eight percentage points more Republican than the national average. This election was very much of a re-match from the previous presidential election 4 years earlier, which featured the same major candidates except for John Sparkman being replaced as Stevenson’s running mate by Kefauver. The presidential election of 1956 was a very partisan election for New York, with 99.8% of the electorate voting for either the Democratic Party or the Republican Party. The widely popular Eisenhower took every county in the State of New York outside of New York City, dominating upstate by landslide margins and also sweeping suburban areas around NYC. Stevenson narrowly won New York City overall by carrying the boroughs of Manhattan, Brooklyn and the Bronx, while Eisenhower won Queens and Staten Island.

Eisenhower won the election in New York by a 22-point landslide. 1956 was the last election in which a Republican presidential candidate took more than 60% of the vote in New York State and won the state by more than twenty points. This was the last time New York voted for a Republican presidential candidate until Eisenhower's vice president, Richard Nixon, won the state in his re-election bid in 1972. To date, this is also the last presidential election in which New York voted more Republican than the nation as a whole, or more Republican than Arizona, Colorado, Idaho, Indiana, Illinois, Missouri, Montana, Nevada, New Mexico, Ohio, Oklahoma, Texas, Virginia, or Wyoming. This was also the last election until 2024 when New York voted to the right of Washington state.

== Results ==
1956 United States presidential election in New York
Party	Candidate	Votes	Percentage	Electoral votes
Republican	Dwight D. Eisenhower (incumbent)	4,345,506	61.24%	45
Democratic	Adlai Stevenson	2,458,282	34.60%	
Liberal	Adlai Stevenson	292,487	4.12%	
Total	Adlai Stevenson	2,750,769	38.73%	0
Write-ins		2,521	0.02%	0
Totals		7,095,971	100.0%	45

=== New York City results ===
1956 Presidential Election in New York City		Manhattan	The Bronx	Brooklyn	Queens	Staten Island	Total	
Democratic- Liberal	Adlai Stevenson	377,856	343,823	557,655	318,723	19,644	1,614,876	50.95%
Democratic- Liberal	Adlai Stevenson	55.70%	57.15%	54.75%	40.61%	23.40%	1,614,876	50.95%
Republican	Dwight D. Eisenhower	300,004	257,382	460,456	466,057	64,233	1,553,298	49.01%
Republican	Dwight D. Eisenhower	44.23%	42.78%	45.21%	59.39%	76.53%	1,553,298	49.01%
TOTAL		678,317	601,588	1,018,479	787,265	83,936	3,169,585	100.00%

=== Results by county ===
County	Dwight D. Eisenhower Republican		Adlai Stevenson Democratic/Liberal		Various candidates Write-ins		Margin		Total votes cast
County	#	%	#	%	#	%	#	%	Total votes cast
Albany	86,202	56.64%	65,982	43.36%			20,220	13.28%	152,184
Allegany	16,068	81.41%	3,668	18.59%			12,400	62.82%	19,736
Bronx	257,382	42.81%	343,823	57.19%			-86,441	-14.38%	601,205
Broome	67,024	74.27%	23,217	25.73%			43,807	48.54%	90,241
Cattaraugus	25,282	72.45%	9,613	27.55%			15,669	44.90%	34,895
Cayuga	26,503	72.08%	10,268	27.92%			16,235	44.16%	36,771
Chautauqua	44,149	68.54%	20,269	31.46%			23,880	37.08%	64,418
Chemung	33,270	74.16%	11,592	25.84%			21,678	48.32%	44,862
Chenango	16,314	81.09%	3,804	18.91%			12,510	62.18%	20,118
Clinton	16,295	70.46%	6,833	29.54%			9,462	40.92%	23,128
Columbia	19,004	79.17%	4,999	20.83%			14,005	58.34%	24,003
Cortland	14,085	79.59%	3,612	20.41%			10,473	59.18%	17,697
Delaware	17,364	81.91%	3,835	18.09%			13,529	63.82%	21,199
Dutchess	53,840	78.35%	14,876	21.65%			38,964	56.70%	68,716
Erie	292,657	63.68%	166,930	36.32%			125,727	27.36%	459,587
Essex	13,930	82.11%	3,035	17.89%			10,895	64.22%	16,965
Franklin	13,003	71.33%	5,226	28.67%			7,777	42.66%	18,229
Fulton	18,244	74.17%	6,352	25.83%			11,892	48.34%	24,596
Genesee	17,614	74.64%	5,986	25.36%			11,628	49.28%	23,600
Greene	14,262	78.91%	3,811	21.09%			10,451	57.82%	18,073
Hamilton	2,619	84.78%	470	15.22%			2,149	69.56%	3,089
Herkimer	22,246	71.68%	8,789	28.32%			13,457	43.36%	31,035
Jefferson	28,429	74.06%	9,959	25.94%			18,470	48.12%	38,388
Kings	460,456	45.23%	557,655	54.77%			-97,199	-9.54%	1,018,111
Lewis	7,764	75.38%	2,536	24.62%			5,228	50.76%	10,300
Livingston	15,523	75.68%	4,989	24.32%			10,534	51.36%	20,512
Madison	18,555	79.10%	4,903	20.90%			13,652	58.20%	23,458
Monroe	183,747	66.84%	91,161	33.16%			92,586	33.68%	274,908
Montgomery	20,678	67.41%	9,996	32.59%			10,682	34.82%	30,674
Nassau	372,358	69.08%	166,646	30.92%			205,712	38.16%	539,004
New York	300,004	44.26%	377,856	55.74%			-77,852	-11.48%	677,860
Niagara	62,433	67.43%	30,161	32.57%			32,272	34.86%	92,594
Oneida	80,178	69.83%	34,649	30.17%			45,529	39.66%	114,827
Onondaga	137,852	73.42%	49,918	26.58%			87,934	46.84%	187,770
Ontario	22,317	74.30%	7,719	25.70%			14,598	48.60%	30,036
Orange	57,739	77.54%	16,722	22.46%			41,017	55.08%	74,461
Orleans	11,895	77.45%	3,464	22.55%			8,431	54.90%	15,359
Oswego	29,277	76.87%	8,809	23.13%			20,468	53.74%	38,086
Otsego	19,484	77.54%	5,644	22.46%			13,840	55.08%	25,128
Putnam	12,898	73.32%	4,694	26.68%			8,204	46.64%	17,592
Queens	466,057	59.39%	318,723	40.61%			147,334	18.78%	784,780
Rensselaer	55,186	72.90%	20,516	27.10%			34,670	45.80%	75,702
Richmond	64,233	76.58%	19,644	23.42%			44,589	53.16%	83,877
Rockland	34,049	71.04%	13,881	28.96%			20,168	42.08%	47,930
Saratoga	32,522	77.69%	9,338	22.31%			23,184	55.38%	41,860
Schenectady	58,540	72.98%	21,673	27.02%			36,867	45.96%	80,213
Schoharie	8,851	73.28%	3,227	26.72%			5,624	46.56%	12,078
Schuyler	5,795	78.23%	1,613	21.77%			4,182	56.46%	7,408
Seneca	10,417	74.20%	3,623	25.80%			6,794	48.40%	14,040
St. Lawrence	31,897	74.54%	10,892	25.46%			21,005	49.08%	42,789
Steuben	33,902	78.22%	9,440	21.78%			24,462	56.44%	43,342
Suffolk	167,805	77.64%	48,323	22.36%			119,482	55.28%	216,128
Sullivan	15,845	63.94%	8,937	36.06%			6,908	27.88%	24,782
Tioga	11,958	78.95%	3,188	21.05%			8,770	57.90%	15,146
Tompkins	19,749	78.29%	5,475	21.71%			14,274	56.58%	25,224
Ulster	43,034	76.36%	13,321	23.64%			29,713	52.72%	56,355
Warren	17,852	82.08%	3,897	17.92%			13,955	64.16%	21,749
Washington	18,449	79.30%	4,817	20.70%			13,632	58.60%	23,266
Wayne	22,940	79.51%	5,910	20.49%			17,030	59.02%	28,850
Westchester	271,906	72.17%	104,857	27.83%			167,049	44.34%	376,763
Wyoming	12,499	78.63%	3,397	21.37%			9,102	57.26%	15,896
Yates	7,910	83.12%	1,606	16.88%			6,304	66.24%	9,516
Totals	4,340,340	61.19%	2,750,769	38.78%	2,227 (Note: These write-in votes were listed only as a statewide total and not separated by county.)	0.03%	1,589,571	22.41%	7,093,336

== See also ==
- United States presidential elections in New York
- History of nuclear weapons
- Presidency of Dwight D. Eisenhower
- Cold War
