= 1952 United States presidential election in New Mexico =

- November 4, 1952

Nominee	Dwight D. Eisenhower	Adlai Stevenson
Party	Republican	Democratic
Home state	New York	Illinois
Running mate	Richard Nixon	John Sparkman
Electoral vote	4	0
Popular vote	132,170	105,661
Percentage	55.39%	44.28%
County results
Eisenhower
50–60%
60–70%
Stevenson
40–50%
50–60%
President before election
Harry S. Truman
Democratic
Elected President
Dwight D. Eisenhower
Republican

The 1952 United States presidential election in New Mexico took place on November 4, 1952. All 48 States were part of the 1952 United States presidential election. State voters chose four electors to represent them in the Electoral College, which voted for President and Vice President.

New Mexico was won by World War II hero and supreme allied commander Dwight D. Eisenhower by a wide 11 percentage point margin. Running against Eisenhower was Governor of Illinois Adlai Stevenson, who carried only the majority of the American South during his two runs for the presidency. Starting with this election, Valencia County would back the national winner in every election until 2020.

This was the last election in which voters in New Mexico chose presidential electors directly. Starting in 1956, the state adopted the modern "short ballot" where voters could only choose between the actual candidates' names, with the understanding that a vote for a candidate was a vote for their party's entire slate of electors.

== Results ==
General Election Results
Party	Pledged to	Elector	Votes
Republican Party	Dwight D. Eisenhower	Mrs. Luis E. Armijo	132,170
Republican Party	Dwight D. Eisenhower	Louis A. McRae	131,515
Republican Party	Dwight D. Eisenhower	C. C. Bacon	131,112
Republican Party	Dwight D. Eisenhower	W. Fields Walker	131,110
Democratic Party	Adlai Stevenson II	Mike F. Apodaca	105,661
Democratic Party	Adlai Stevenson II	W. W. Nichols	105,435
Democratic Party	Adlai Stevenson II	Mary J. Sweeney	105,386
Democratic Party	Adlai Stevenson II	Alice Woolston	104,914
Prohibition Party	Stuart Hamblen	Lewis A. Myers	297
Prohibition Party	Stuart Hamblen	Luther B. Mitchell	287
Prohibition Party	Stuart Hamblen	Sadie E. Evans	273
Prohibition Party	Stuart Hamblen	Mrs. Forrest E. Wilson	271
Progressive Party	Vincent Hallinan	Vincente B. Becerra	225
Christian Nationalist Party	Douglas MacArthur	Everyl G. Gore	220
Christian Nationalist Party	Douglas MacArthur	Florence Porterfield	217
Christian Nationalist Party	Douglas MacArthur	Oralee Porter	215
Christian Nationalist Party	Douglas MacArthur	J. Earl Syling	215
Progressive Party	Vincent Hallinan	Virginia L. Chacon	212
Progressive Party	Vincent Hallinan	Ruth S. Young	212
Progressive Party	Vincent Hallinan	Helen Mallery	199
Socialist Labor Party	Eric Hass	Paris W. Linam	35
Socialist Labor Party	Eric Hass	Jeannete Reynolds	34
Socialist Labor Party	Eric Hass	James William Peach	34
Socialist Labor Party	Eric Hass	Dallas Reynolds	32
Votes cast (Note: Based on totals for highest elector on each ticket)			238,608

=== Results by county ===
County	Dwight D. Eisenhower Republican		Adlai Stevenson Democratic		Various candidates Other parties		Margin		Total votes cast
County	#	%	#	%	#	%	#	%	Total votes cast
Bernalillo	33,964	59.38%	23,164	40.50%	72	0.12%	10,800	18.88%	57,200
Catron	741	61.49%	464	38.51%	0	0.00%	277	22.98%	1,205
Chaves	7,018	63.92%	3,880	35.34%	81	0.74%	3,138	28.58%	10,979
Colfax	3,397	51.58%	3,184	48.34%	5	0.08%	213	3.24%	6,586
Curry	5,023	59.38%	3,422	40.45%	14	0.17%	1,601	18.93%	8,459
De Baca	782	57.25%	581	42.53%	3	0.22%	201	14.72%	1,366
Dona Ana	5,902	56.33%	4,556	43.48%	20	0.19%	1,346	12.85%	10,478
Eddy	6,041	44.45%	7,495	55.15%	55	0.40%	-1,454	-10.70%	13,591
Grant	3,421	43.18%	4,315	54.47%	186	2.35%	-894	-11.29%	7,922
Guadalupe	1,575	53.90%	1,347	46.10%	0	0.00%	228	7.80%	2,922
Harding	760	63.49%	436	36.42%	1	0.09%	324	27.07%	1,197
Hidalgo	781	50.58%	757	49.03%	6	0.39%	24	1.55%	1,544
Lea	4,738	47.52%	5,204	52.19%	29	0.29%	-466	-4.67%	9,971
Lincoln	2,004	64.52%	1,095	35.25%	7	0.23%	909	29.27%	3,106
Los Alamos	2,226	49.30%	2,281	50.52%	8	0.18%	-55	-1.22%	4,515
Luna	1,729	55.86%	1,332	43.04%	34	1.10%	397	12.82%	3,095
McKinley	3,091	49.80%	3,097	49.90%	19	0.30%	-6	-0.10%	6,207
Mora	1,849	56.61%	1,413	43.26%	4	0.13%	436	13.35%	3,266
Otero	2,456	53.16%	2,162	46.80%	2	0.04%	294	6.36%	4,620
Quay	2,711	53.00%	2,375	46.43%	29	0.57%	336	6.57%	5,115
Rio Arriba	4,336	48.69%	4,564	51.25%	5	0.06%	-228	-2.56%	8,905
Roosevelt	3,030	56.74%	2,298	43.03%	12	0.23%	732	13.71%	5,340
San Juan	3,864	69.73%	1,659	29.94%	18	0.33%	2,205	39.79%	5,541
San Miguel	5,360	54.59%	4,451	45.34%	7	0.07%	909	9.25%	9,818
Sandoval	1,795	52.06%	1,647	47.77%	6	0.17%	148	4.29%	3,448
Santa Fe	9,011	56.62%	6,786	42.64%	119	0.74%	2,225	13.98%	15,916
Sierra	2,033	63.61%	1,158	36.23%	5	0.16%	875	27.38%	3,196
Socorro	2,224	55.52%	1,777	44.36%	5	0.12%	447	11.16%	4,006
Taos	2,763	48.94%	2,877	50.96%	6	0.10%	-114	-2.02%	5,646
Torrance	1,747	54.99%	1,422	44.76%	8	0.25%	325	10.23%	3,177
Union	1,988	63.39%	1,142	36.42%	6	0.19%	846	26.97%	3,136
Valencia	3,810	53.47%	3,310	46.46%	5	0.07%	500	7.01%	7,125
Totals	132,170	55.39%	105,661	44.28%	777	0.33%	26,509	11.11%	238,608

==== Counties that flipped from Democratic to Republican ====
- Bernalillo
- Catron
- Chaves
- Colfax
- Curry
- De Baca
- Doña Ana
- Harding
- Hidalgo
- Luna
- Otero
- Quay
- Roosevelt
- San Miguel
- Sandoval
- Sierra
- Union

== See also ==
- United States presidential elections in New Mexico
