= Sofia, New Mexico =

Unincorporated community in New Mexico, US

Sofia is an unincorporated community in Union County, northeast New Mexico, United States. It lies at 36°27′06″N 103°49′45″W, at an elevation of 6,221 feet (1,896 m).

Sofia, named after the Bulgarian capital Sofia, was established in 1911 as the oldest Bulgarian agricultural colony in the United States. The community's founders were brothers Dimitar and Ivan Kostadinov, who leased 320 acres (1.3 km^{2}; 0.50 sq mi) of land. In 1912, the name of the colony was chosen at a meeting; alternatives that were considered were Georgetown and Tarnovo (after the medieval Bulgarian capital).

Gancho Belchev, Ivan Stoyanov, Hristo Naumov, Kosta Dimitrov, Risto Pochev and Kolyu Iliev arrived in the spring of 1914 and settled in the town. The agricultural colony slowly grew as the colonists got married and leased additional land. By the end of World War I, each of the eight Bulgarian families owned and cultivated 120 to 150 acres (0.49 to 0.61 km^{2}; 0.19 to 0.23 sq mi). The most widely grown crops were beans, though wheat, maize, millet and potatoes were also popular.

By 1916, the colonists had begun building their family houses. A post office was soon established by the New Mexico state authorities, and a few shops were opened. Until 1920, Sofia was a farming cooperative; in that year, the farmers became owners of the land they had been leasing. Several of the farmers chose to sell the land they had acquired and returned to Bulgaria in the 1920s. The colony declined after World War II.
