= 2020 United States presidential election in New Mexico =

- November 3, 2020
- Turnout: 68.67% (of eligible voters) (▲6.31 pp)

Nominee	Joe Biden	Donald Trump
Party	Democratic	Republican
Home state	Delaware	Florida
Running mate	Kamala Harris	Mike Pence
Electoral vote	5	0
Popular vote	501,614	401,894
Percentage	54.29%	43.50%

Biden
40–50%
50–60%
60–70%
70–80%
80–90%
90–100%
Trump
40–50%
50–60%
60–70%
70–80%
80–90%
90–100%
Tie/No data
President before election
Donald Trump
Republican
Elected President
Joe Biden
Democratic

The 2020 United States presidential election in New Mexico was held on Tuesday, November 3, 2020, as part of the 2020 United States presidential election in which all 50 states plus the District of Columbia participated. New Mexico voters chose electors to represent them in the Electoral College via a popular vote, pitting the Republican Party's nominee, incumbent President Donald Trump, and running mate Vice President Mike Pence against Democratic Party nominee, former Vice President Joe Biden, and his running mate California Senator Kamala Harris. New Mexico has five electoral votes in the Electoral College.

New Mexico was won by Biden by a 10.79% margin of victory. Prior to the election, most news organizations making election predictions considered New Mexico as a state Biden would win, or a safe blue state. Biden scored victories in all of the state's three largest counties: Bernalillo, Doña Ana, and Santa Fe counties, home to Albuquerque, Las Cruces, and Santa Fe, respectively; all of them voted for Biden in margins greater than ten points. Aggregate polling correctly showed Biden ahead by double-digits in the state.

Per exit polls by the Associated Press, much of Biden's strength in New Mexico came from Latino voters, from whom he garnered 61% of the vote. These included 54% of Latinos of Mexican heritage and 70% of Spanish-Americans. Biden also carried a plurality of Caucasian/white voters in the state (49% to Trump's 48%). He also won over Native Americans, garnering over 60% of the vote. 53% of voters believed the Trump administration was doing too little to help Native American reservations in New Mexico during the COVID-19 pandemic, and these voters broke for Biden by 75%–23%.

This was the first election since 1968 in which New Mexico voted more Republican than neighboring Colorado. Biden became the first Democrat to win the White House without carrying Colfax County, or Hidalgo County since 1920, when it was created. This was the first election since 1948 in which Valencia County voted for the losing candidate. Although New Mexico is no longer classified as a critical swing state, Trump became the first Republican incumbent to lose New Mexico in two consecutive elections and only the second U.S. president, after Jimmy Carter, to do so in the state's history.

== Primary elections ==
The primary elections were held on June 2, 2020.

=== Republican primary ===
Donald Trump ran unopposed in the Republican primary, and thus received all of the state's 22 delegates to the 2020 Republican National Convention.

2020 New Mexico Republican presidential primary
Candidate	Votes	%	Estimated delegates
Donald Trump (incumbent)	144,067	91.25	22
Uncommitted	13,809	8.75	0
Total	157,876	100%	22

=== Democratic primary ===
2020 New Mexico Democratic presidential primary
Candidate	Votes	%	Delegates
Joe Biden	181,700	73.30	30
Bernie Sanders (withdrawn)	37,435	15.10	4
Elizabeth Warren (withdrawn)	14,552	5.87	
Andrew Yang (withdrawn)	4,026	1.62	
Tulsi Gabbard (withdrawn)	2,735	1.10	
Deval Patrick (withdrawn)	971	0.39	
Uncommitted Delegate	6,461	2.61	
Total	247,880	100%	34

=== Libertarian primary ===
2020 New Mexico Libertarian presidential primary
- June 2, 2020
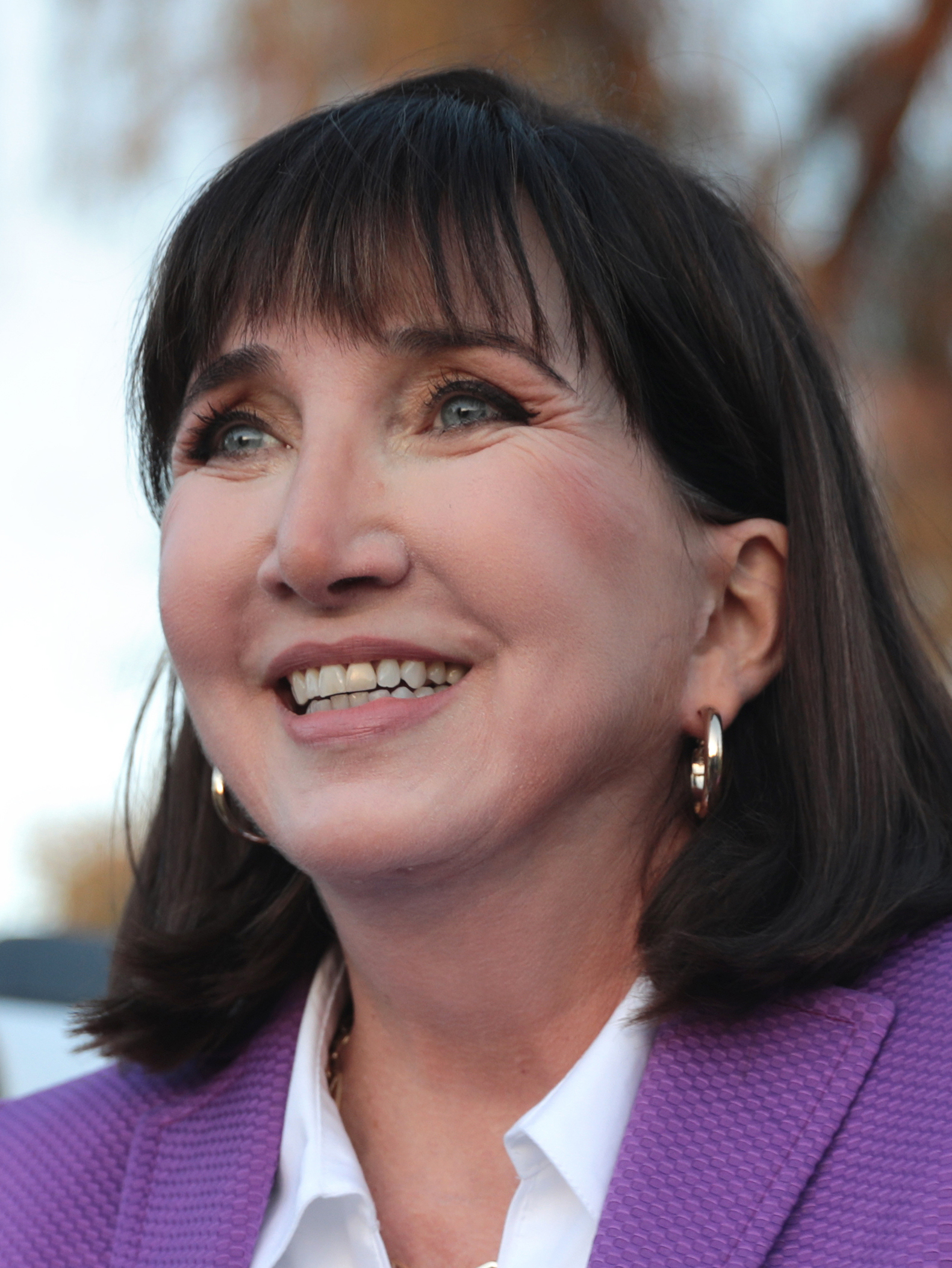

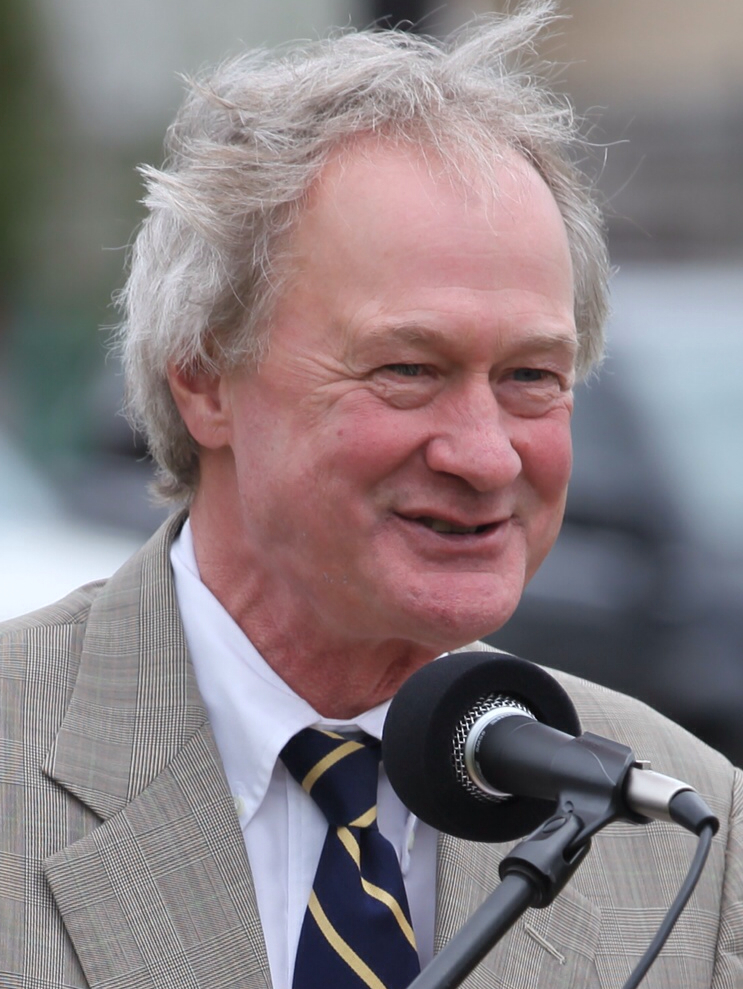

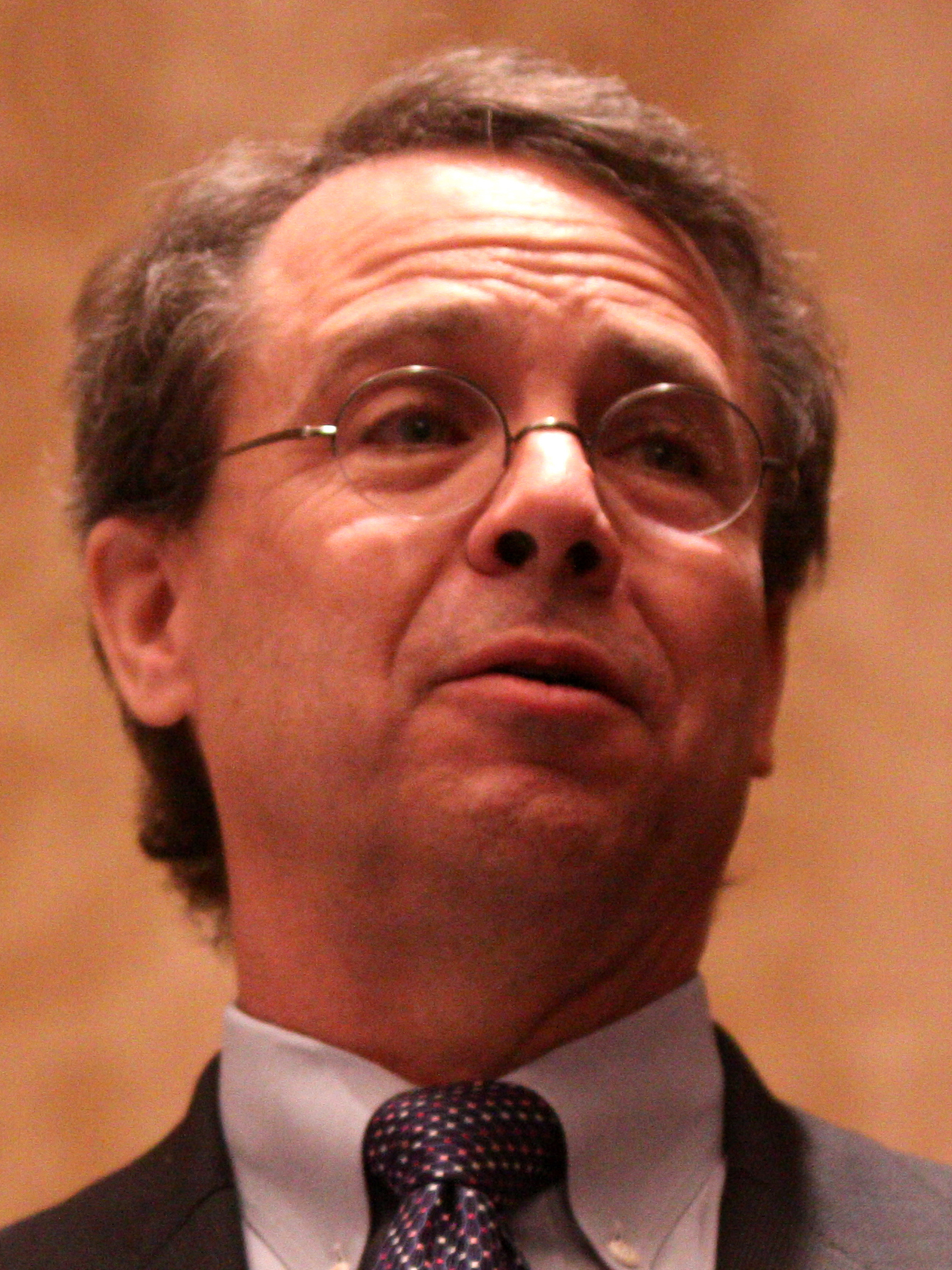

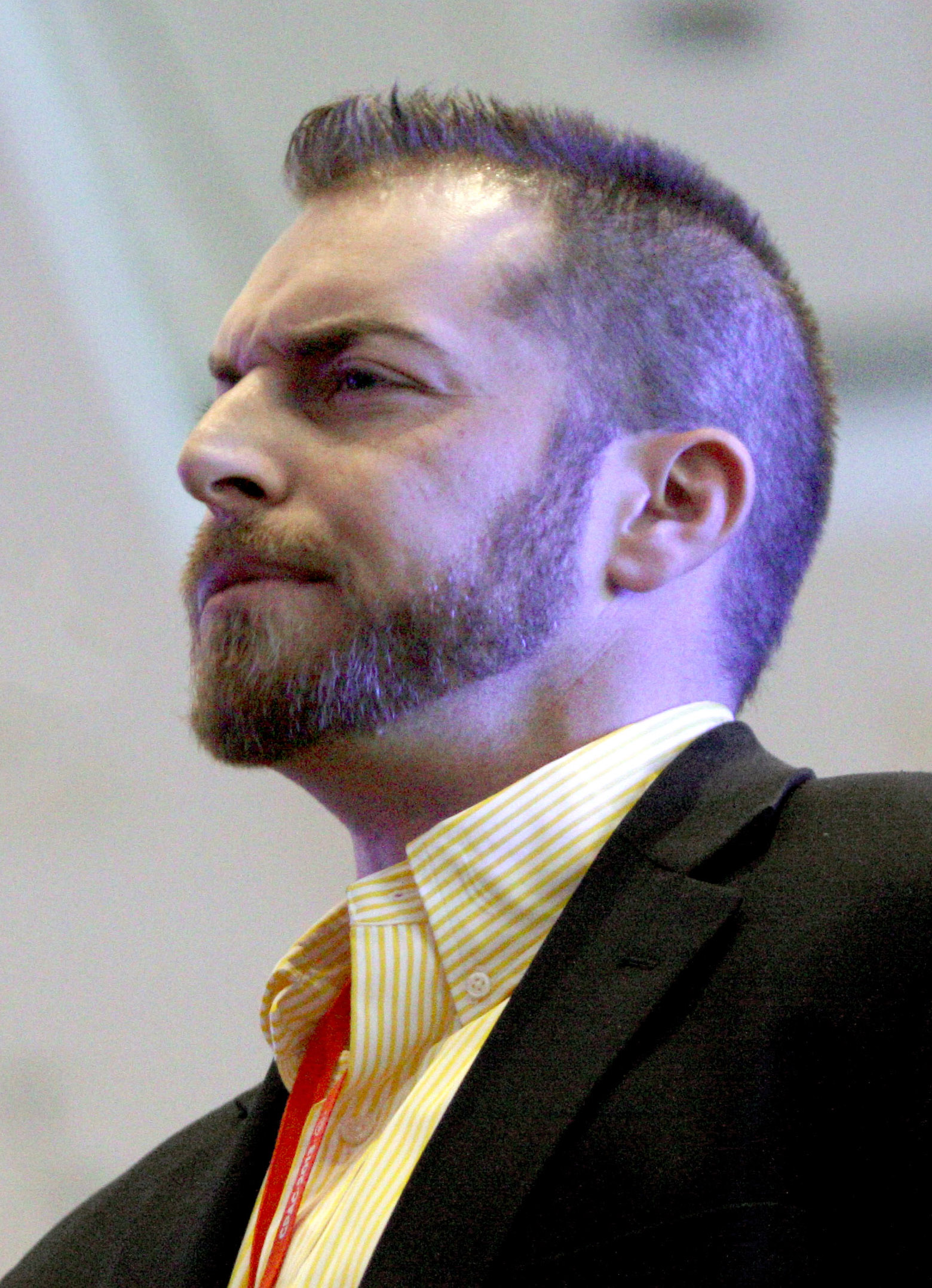

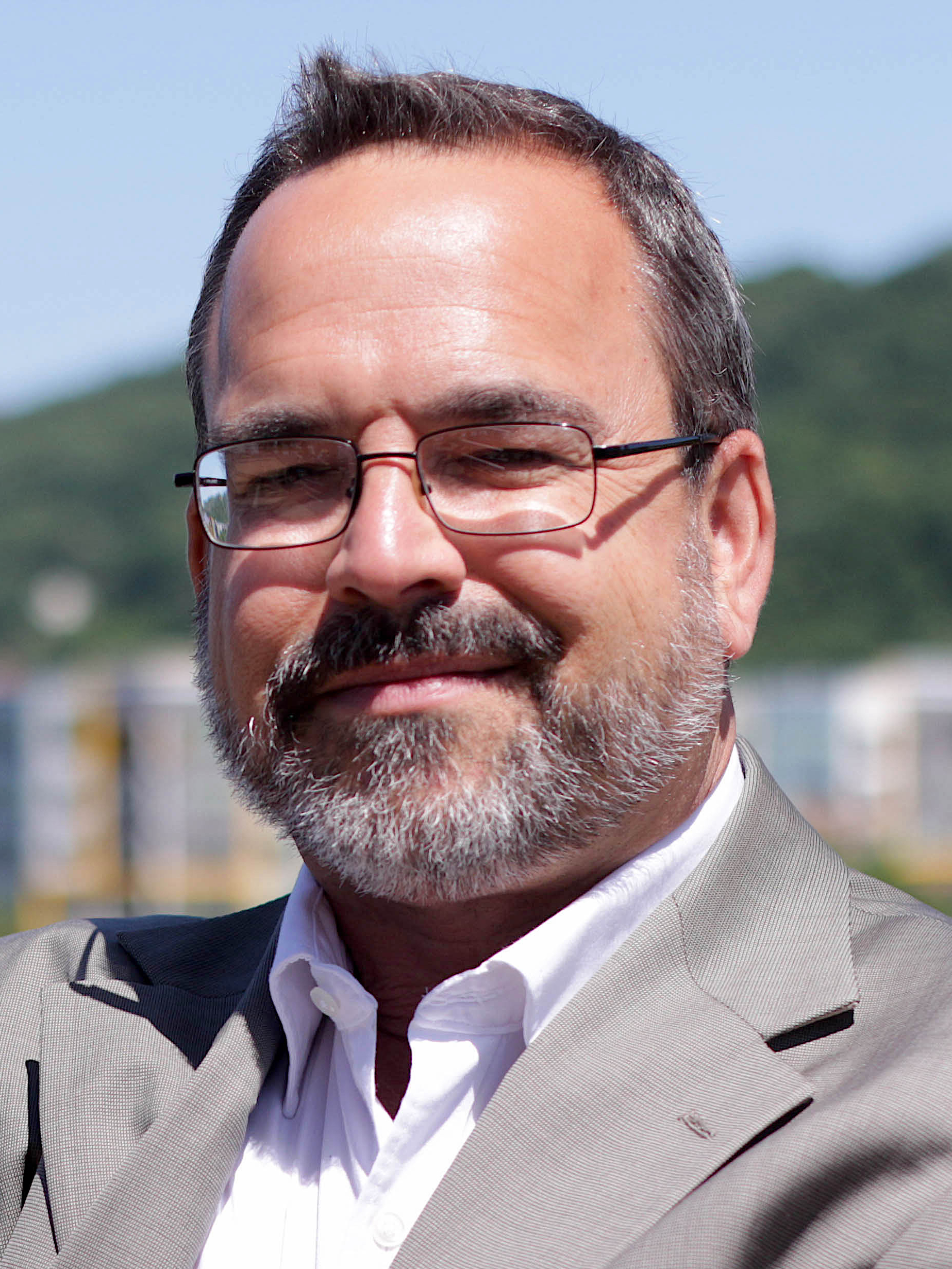
Candidate	Jo Jorgensen (nominee) (Note: Jorgensen was nominated at the 2020 Libertarian National Convention on May 23, ten days before the New Mexico primary, which was delayed due to the COVID-19 pandemic.)	Uncommitted	Lincoln Chafee (withdrawn)
Home state	South Carolina	N/A	Wyoming
Popular vote	520	330	158
Percentage	33.12%	21.02%	10.06%
Candidate	Jacob Hornberger (lost)	Adam Kokesh (lost)	Sam Robb (lost)
Home state	Virginia	Indiana	Pennsylvania
Popular vote	154	124	90
Percentage	9.81%	7.90%	5.73%
Election results by county
Jo Jorgensen Uncommitted	Tie No votes

New Mexico Libertarian presidential primary, June 2, 2020
Candidate	Votes	Percentage
Jo Jorgensen (nominee)	520	33.12%
Uncommitted	330	21.02%
Lincoln Chafee (withdrawn)	158	10.06%
Jacob Hornberger (lost)	154	9.81%
Adam Kokesh (lost)	124	7.90%
Sam Robb (lost)	90	5.73%
John Monds (lost)	63	4.01%
Dan Behrman (lost)	58	3.69%
Arvin Vohra (lost)	39	2.48%
James Ogle (lost)	34	2.17%
Total	1,557	100%

== General election ==
=== Final predictions ===
Source	Ranking
The Cook Political Report	Solid D
Inside Elections	Solid D
Sabato's Crystal Ball	Likely D
Politico	Likely D
RCP	Lean D
Niskanen	Safe D
CNN	Solid D
The Economist	Safe D
CBS News	Likely D
270towin	Likely D
ABC News	Solid D
NPR	Likely D
NBC News	Likely D
538	Solid D

=== Polling ===
==== Graphical summary ====
View source data.

==== Aggregate polls ====
Source of poll aggregation	Dates administered	Dates updated	Joe Biden Democratic	Donald Trump Republican	Other/ Undecided (Note: Calculated by taking the difference of 100% and all other candidates combined.)	Margin
270 to Win	October 6 – November 1, 2020	November 3, 2020	53.5%	40.5%	6.0%	Biden +13.0
FiveThirtyEight	until November 2, 2020	November 3, 2020	53.8%	42.3%	3.9%	Biden +11.5
Average			53.7%	41.4%	4.9%	Biden +12.3

==== Polls ====
Poll source	Date(s) administered	Sample size (Note: Key: A – all adults RV – registered voters LV – likely voters V – unclear)	Margin of error	Donald Trump Republican	Joe Biden Democratic	Jo Jorgensen Libertarian	Howie Hawkins Green	Other	Undecided
SurveyMonkey/Axios	Oct 20 – Nov 2, 2020	1,481 (LV)	± 3.5%	42% (Note: Overlapping sample with the previous SurveyMonkey/Axios poll, but more information available regarding sample size)	56%	–	–	–	–
Research & Polling Inc./Albuquerque Journal	Oct 23–29, 2020	1,180 (LV)	± 2.9%	42%	54%	–	–	3% (Note: "Other candidate" with 3%)	1%
SurveyMonkey/Axios	Oct 1–28, 2020	2,719 (LV)	–	46%	52%	–	–	–	–
GBAO Strategies/GBAO Strategies/Ben Ray Luján (D) (Note: Poll sponsored by Ben Ray Luján's campaign for the 2020 United States Senate election in New Mexico)	Oct 14–17, 2020	600 (LV)	± 4.0%	41%	54%	–	–	–	–
Public Policy Polling/NM Political Report	Sep 30 – Oct 1, 2020	886 (LV)	± 3.3%	39%	53%	2%	–	2% (Note: "other" with 2%)	4%
SurveyMonkey/Axios	Sep 1–30, 2020	1,015 (LV)	–	44%	54%	–	–	–	1%
Research & Polling Inc./Albuquerque Journal	Aug 26 – Sep 2, 2020	1,123 (LV)	± 2.9%	39%	54%	–	–	–	–
SurveyMonkey/Axios	Aug 1–31, 2020	1,087 (LV)	–	43%	56%	–	–	–	2%
SurveyMonkey/Axios	Jul 1–31, 2020	904 (LV)	–	48%	49%	–	–	–	2%
SurveyMonkey/Axios	Jun 8–30, 2020	506 (LV)	–	50%	49%	–	–	–	1%
Public Policy Polling/NM Political Report	Jun 12–13, 2020	740 (V)	± 3.6%	39%	53%	–	–	–	8%
Public Policy Polling/The Majority Institute (Note: This poll was sponsored by the Majority Institute, a communications firm which supports the Democratic Party)	Apr 20–21, 2020	1,091 (RV)	± 3.1%	40%	52%	–	–	–	–
Emerson College	Jan 3–6, 2020	967 (RV)	± 3.1%	46%	54%	–	–	–	–

Former candidates

Donald Trump vs. Pete Buttigieg

Poll source	Date(s) administered	Sample size	Margin of error	Donald Trump (R)	Pete Buttigieg (D)
Emerson College	Jan 3–6, 2020	967 (RV)	± 3.1%	45%	55%

Donald Trump vs. Bernie Sanders

Poll source	Date(s) administered	Sample size	Margin of error	Donald Trump (R)	Bernie Sanders (D)
Emerson College	Jan 3–6, 2020	967 (RV)	± 3.1%	41%	59%

Donald Trump vs. Elizabeth Warren

Poll source	Date(s) administered	Sample size	Margin of error	Donald Trump (R)	Elizabeth Warren (D)
Emerson College	Jan 3–6, 2020	967 (RV)	± 3.1%	46%	54%

=== Results ===
2020 United States presidential election in New Mexico
Party	Candidate	Votes	%	±%
Democratic	Joe Biden Kamala Harris	501,614	54.29	+6.03
Republican	Donald Trump (incumbent) Mike Pence (incumbent)	401,894	43.50	+3.46
Libertarian	Jo Jorgensen Spike Cohen	12,585	1.36	−7.98
Green	Howie Hawkins Angela Walker	4,426	0.48	−0.76
Constitution	Sheila "Samm" Tittle (Note: The national Constitution Party nominated Don Blankenship for President with William Mohr as his running mate, but the New Mexico state party chose Tittle and Sandige.) David Sandige	1,806	0.20	+0.01
Socialism and Liberation	Gloria La Riva Sunil Freeman	1,640	0.18	+0.04
Total votes		923,965	100%	
Democratic win				

==== By county ====
County	Joe Biden Democratic		Donald Trump Republican		Various candidates Other parties		Margin		Total votes cast
County	#	%	#	%	#	%	#	%	Total votes cast
Bernalillo	193,757	61.01%	116,135	36.57%	7,698	2.42%	77,622	24.44%	317,590
Catron	595	25.58%	1,698	73.00%	33	1.42%	-1,103	-47.42%	2,326
Chaves	6,381	28.43%	15,656	69.76%	406	1.81%	-9,275	-41.33%	22,443
Cibola	4,745	53.30%	3,975	44.65%	183	2.05%	770	8.65%	8,903
Colfax	2,611	43.40%	3,271	54.37%	134	2.23%	-660	-10.97%	6,016
Curry	4,307	28.52%	10,444	69.16%	350	2.32%	-6,137	-40.64%	15,101
De Baca	231	25.64%	656	72.81%	14	1.55%	-425	-47.17%	901
Doña Ana	47,957	58.03%	32,802	39.69%	1,882	2.28%	15,155	18.34%	82,641
Eddy	5,424	23.36%	17,454	75.16%	344	1.48%	-12,030	-51.80%	23,222
Grant	7,590	52.58%	6,553	45.40%	292	2.02%	1,037	7.18%	14,435
Guadalupe	1,234	56.37%	917	41.89%	38	1.74%	317	14.48%	2,189
Harding	179	35.45%	319	63.17%	7	1.38%	-140	-27.72%	505
Hidalgo	823	41.69%	1,120	56.74%	31	1.57%	-297	-15.05%	1,974
Lea	4,061	19.41%	16,531	79.03%	326	1.56%	-12,470	-59.62%	20,918
Lincoln	3,194	30.99%	6,942	67.36%	170	1.65%	-3,748	-36.37%	10,306
Los Alamos	7,554	61.45%	4,278	34.80%	461	3.75%	3,276	26.65%	12,293
Luna	3,563	43.97%	4,408	54.40%	132	1.63%	-845	-10.43%	8,103
McKinley	18,029	68.07%	7,801	29.45%	656	2.48%	10,228	38.62%	26,486
Mora	1,745	64.97%	903	33.62%	38	1.41%	842	31.35%	2,686
Otero	8,485	36.00%	14,521	61.61%	565	2.39%	-6,036	-25.61%	23,571
Quay	1,170	30.21%	2,634	68.01%	69	1.78%	-1,464	-37.80%	3,873
Rio Arriba	10,990	66.09%	5,408	32.52%	230	1.39%	5,582	33.57%	16,628
Roosevelt	1,802	27.27%	4,634	70.13%	172	2.60%	-2,832	-42.86%	6,608
San Juan	18,083	34.58%	32,874	62.86%	1,337	2.56%	-14,791	-28.28%	52,294
San Miguel	7,888	68.41%	3,421	29.67%	222	1.92%	4,467	38.74%	11,531
Sandoval	40,588	53.01%	34,174	44.64%	1,800	2.35%	6,414	8.37%	76,562
Santa Fe	62,530	76.05%	18,329	22.29%	1,368	1.66%	44,201	53.76%	82,227
Sierra	2,265	38.10%	3,542	59.58%	138	2.32%	-1,277	-21.48%	5,945
Socorro	3,722	51.98%	3,255	45.46%	183	1.86%	467	6.52%	7,160
Taos	13,121	76.37%	3,715	21.62%	345	2.01%	9,406	54.75%	17,181
Torrance	2,344	32.19%	4,772	65.54%	165	2.27%	-2,428	-33.35%	7,281
Union	383	21.41%	1,388	77.59%	18	1.00%	-1,005	-56.18%	1,789
Valencia	14,263	44.19%	17,364	53.80%	650	2.01%	-3,101	-9.61%	32,277
Totals	501,614	54.29%	401,894	43.50%	20,457	2.21%	99,720	10.79%	923,965

==== By congressional district ====
Biden won two of three congressional districts.

District	Trump	Biden	Representative
1st	37%	60%	Deb Haaland
2nd	55%	43%	Xochitl Torres Small
2nd	55%	43%	Yvette Herrell
3rd	40%	58%	Ben Ray Luján
3rd	40%	58%	Teresa Leger Fernandez

== Analysis ==
The state used to be quite competitive, voting for Democrat Al Gore in 2000 with a margin of only 366 votes and Republican George W. Bush in 2004 by 5,988 votes. However, New Mexico has become a reliably blue state since then as Democrats have relied on Hispanic, Native American, and urban voters to deliver victories.

On the other hand, Trump increased his popular vote percentage by 3.46%, earning 43.5% of the vote share and over 400,000 votes in total. Much of this improvement could be attributed to the fact that the Libertarian Party nominee in 2016 had been former New Mexico Governor Gary Johnson, who earned 9.34% of the vote in his home state; Johnson did not run in 2020. That said, Trump's 43.5% represented not only an improvement on his own vote share in 2016, but also on those of future Utah Senator Mitt Romney in 2012 (42.84%) and Arizona Senator John McCain in 2008 (41.78%).

== Aftermath ==
On December 14, 2020, the Trump campaign filed a lawsuit against the New Mexico Secretary of State over the use of ballot drop-boxes for the 2020 presidential election. However, on January 11, 2021, five days after Congress counted Joe Biden's electoral votes, the campaign dropped the lawsuit. Trump attorneys Mark Caruso and Michael Smith cited “events that have transpired since the inception of this lawsuit” in a three-page motion as the reason for dropping the lawsuit. Despite the withdrawal, the motion still allows for revisiting these concerns in the future.

== See also ==
- United States presidential elections in New Mexico
- 2020 New Mexico elections
- 2020 United States presidential election
- 2020 Democratic Party presidential primaries
- 2020 Libertarian Party presidential primaries
- 2020 Republican Party presidential primaries
- 2020 United States elections

== Notes ==
Partisan clients
