= 1924 United States presidential election in New Mexico =

- November 4, 1924

Nominee	Calvin Coolidge	John W. Davis	Robert M. La Follette
Party	Republican	Democratic	Progressive
Home state	Massachusetts	West Virginia	Wisconsin
Running mate	Charles G. Dawes	Charles W. Bryan	Burton K. Wheeler
Electoral vote	3	0	0
Popular vote	54,745	48,542	9,543
Percentage	48.52%	43.02%	8.46%
County results
Coolidge
40–50%
50–60%
60–70%
70–80%
Davis
40–50%
50–60%
60–70%
70–80%
President before election
Calvin Coolidge
Republican
Elected President
Calvin Coolidge
Republican

The 1924 United States presidential election in New Mexico took place on November 4, 1924. All contemporary forty-eight states were part of the 1924 United States presidential election. State voters chose three electors to represent them in the Electoral College, which voted for President and Vice President.

New Mexico was won by incumbent Republican President Calvin Coolidge of Massachusetts with 48.5% of the vote, over Democratic West Virginia Congressman John W. Davis's 43%, and Progressive Party Wisconsin U.S. Senator Robert La Follette's 8.5%.

== Results ==
General Election Results
Party	Pledged to	Elector	Votes
Republican Party	Calvin Coolidge	George E. Breece	54,745
Republican Party	Calvin Coolidge	Mrs. Miguel A. Gonzalez	54,470
Republican Party	Calvin Coolidge	Robert Halley	54,411
Democratic Party	John W. Davis	O. B. Earickson	48,542
Democratic Party	John W. Davis	Felix Garcia	48,473
Democratic Party	John W. Davis	Mrs. Jose A. Baca	48,364
Progressive Party	Robert M. La Follette	R. E. Rowells	9,543
Progressive Party	Robert M. La Follette	Anna L. Fishback	9,247
Progressive Party	Robert M. La Follette	A. C. Gutierrez	9,222
Votes cast (Note: Based on totals for highest elector on each ticket)			112,830

=== Results by county ===
County	Calvin Coolidge Republican		John W. Davis Democratic		Robert M. La Follette Progressive		Margin		Total votes cast (Note: Based on the highest elector on each ticket)
County	#	%	#	%	#	%	#	%	Total votes cast
Bernalillo	7,078	49.55%	6,023	42.17%	1,183	8.28%	1,055	7.39%	14,284
Catron	499	47.30%	418	39.62%	138	13.08%	81	7.68%	1,055
Chaves	1,519	39.40%	2,168	56.24%	168	4.36%	-649	-16.84%	3,855
Colfax	3,512	48.06%	3,067	41.97%	728	9.96%	445	6.09%	7,307
Curry	669	20.55%	1,738	53.39%	848	26.05%	890 (Note: In this county where La Follette ran ahead of Coolidge, percentage margin given is Davis percentage minus La Follette percentage. Vote margin is Davis vote total minus La Follette vote total.)	27.34%	3,255
De Baca	270	29.03%	574	61.72%	86	9.25%	-304	-32.69%	930
Doña Ana	2,823	58.58%	1,775	36.83%	221	4.59%	1,048	21.75%	4,819
Eddy	658	28.36%	1,524	65.69%	138	5.95%	-866	-37.33%	2,320
Grant	1,756	39.59%	2,085	47.00%	595	13.41%	-329	-7.42%	4,436
Guadalupe	1,329	51.83%	1,056	41.19%	179	6.98%	273	10.65%	2,564
Harding	721	42.14%	714	41.73%	276	16.13%	7	0.41%	1,711
Hidalgo	261	28.19%	476	51.40%	189	20.41%	-215	-23.22%	926
Lea	138	18.75%	552	75.00%	46	6.25%	-414	-56.25%	736
Lincoln	1,087	49.05%	837	37.77%	292	13.18%	250	11.28%	2,216
Luna	709	43.28%	596	36.69%	333	20.33%	113	6.90%	1,638
McKinley	1,653	51.24%	1,150	35.65%	423	13.11%	503	15.59%	3,226
Mora	2,197	50.90%	2,087	48.35%	32	0.74%	110	2.55%	4,316
Otero	832	41.17%	886	43.84%	303	14.99%	-54	-2.67%	2,021
Quay	851	27.84%	1,548	50.64%	658	21.52%	-697	-22.80%	3,057
Rio Arriba	3,707	56.24%	2,734	41.48%	150	2.28%	973	14.76%	6,591
Roosevelt	398	19.54%	1,340	65.78%	299	14.68%	-942	-46.24%	2,037
San Juan	889	44.88%	819	41.34%	273	13.78%	70	3.53%	1,981
San Miguel	3,894	50.56%	3,543	46.00%	265	3.44%	351	4.56%	7,702
Sandoval	1,587	58.52%	1,096	40.41%	29	1.07%	491	18.10%	2,712
Santa Fe	4,010	59.05%	2,602	38.32%	179	2.64%	1,408	20.73%	6,791
Sierra	632	48.17%	546	41.62%	134	10.21%	86	6.55%	1,312
Socorro	2,332	62.32%	1,251	33.43%	159	4.25%	1,081	28.89%	3,742
Taos	2,470	58.68%	1,655	39.32%	84	2.00%	815	19.36%	4,209
Torrance	1,666	51.18%	1,269	38.99%	320	9.83%	397	12.20%	3,255
Union	1,415	37.77%	1,735	46.32%	596	15.91%	-320	-8.54%	3,746
Valencia	3,183	78.01%	678	16.62%	219	5.37%	2,505	61.40%	4,080
Total	54,745	48.52%	48,542	43.02%	9,534	8.46%	6,203	5.50%	112,830

==== Counties that flipped from Democratic to Republican ====
- Luna

==== Counties that flipped from Republican to Democratic ====
- Grant
- Otero
- Union

== See also ==
- United States presidential elections in New Mexico
