= 1984 United States presidential election in New Mexico =

Presidential Election in the United States in 1984

- November 6, 1984

Nominee	Ronald Reagan	Walter Mondale
Party	Republican	Democratic
Home state	California	Minnesota
Running mate	George H. W. Bush	Geraldine Ferraro
Electoral vote	5	0
Popular vote	307,101	201,769
Percentage	59.70%	39.23%
County results
Reagan
50–60%
60–70%
70–80%
Mondale
50–60%
60–70%
President before election
Ronald Reagan
Republican
Elected President
Ronald Reagan
Republican

The 1984 United States presidential election in New Mexico took place on November 6, 1984. All fifty states and the District of Columbia, were part of the 1984 United States presidential election. State voters chose five electors to the Electoral College, which selected the president and vice president of the United States. New Mexico was won by incumbent United States President Ronald Reagan of California, who was running against former Vice President Walter Mondale of Minnesota. Reagan ran for a second time with incumbent Vice President former C.I.A. Director George H. W. Bush of Texas, and Mondale ran with Representative Geraldine Ferraro of New York, the first major female candidate for the vice presidency.

The presidential election of 1984 was a very partisan election for New Mexico, with more than 98 percent of the electorate voting for either the Democratic or Republican parties. In typical form for the time, the highly populated counties of Bernalillo and Los Alamos turned out mainly Republican. Meanwhile, the ongoing Democratic stronghold in the northern part of the state, inclusive of Santa Fe County and Rio Arriba County, is evident during this election.

Reagan won the election in New Mexico with a resounding 20-point sweep, making New Mexico 2.3% more Republican than the national average. As of the 2024 presidential election, this is the last election in which Guadalupe County and the only election in which recently created Cibola County voted for a Republican presidential candidate. In addition, this is also the most recent presidential election when the Republican candidate won the state by a double-digit margin.

== Results ==
1984 United States presidential election in New Mexico
Party	Candidate	Votes	%	±%
Republican	Ronald Reagan (incumbent); George H. W. Bush (incumbent)	307,101	59.70%	+4.73
Democratic	Walter Mondale; Geraldine Ferraro	201,769	39.23%	+2.45
Libertarian	David Bergland; James A. Lewis	4,459	0.87%	−0.09
Citizens	Sonia Johnson; Richard J. Walton	455	0.09%	−0.39
Socialist Workers	Melvin T. Mason; Matilde Zimmermann	224	0.07%	±0.00
Prohibition	Earl Dodge; Warren C. Martin	206	0.04%	−0.24
New Alliance	Dennis L. Serrette; Nancy Ross	155	0.03%	N/A
Write-in		1	0.00%	
Total votes		514,370	100.00%	
Republican win				

=== Results by county ===
County	Ronald Reagan Republican		Walter Mondale Democratic		Various candidates Other parties		Margin		Total votes cast
County	#	%	#	%	#	%	#	%	Total votes cast
Bernalillo	104,694	60.08%	67,789	38.90%	1,779	1.02%	36,905	21.18%	174,262
Catron	970	68.55%	418	29.54%	27	1.91%	552	39.01%	1,415
Chaves	15,248	73.37%	5,332	25.66%	202	0.97%	9,916	47.71%	20,782
Cibola	3,578	53.09%	3,140	46.59%	22	0.32%	438	6.50%	6,740
Colfax	2,994	54.59%	2,435	44.39%	56	1.02%	559	10.20%	5,485
Curry	9,188	74.01%	3,108	25.03%	119	0.96%	6,080	48.98%	12,415
De Baca	756	65.23%	386	33.30%	17	1.47%	370	31.93%	1,159
Dona Ana	22,153	60.87%	13,878	38.13%	362	1.00%	8,275	22.74%	36,393
Eddy	11,810	60.99%	7,364	38.03%	191	0.98%	4,446	22.96%	19,365
Grant	4,979	45.93%	5,755	53.09%	106	0.98%	-776	-7.16%	10,840
Guadalupe	990	50.36%	946	48.12%	30	1.52%	44	2.24%	1,966
Harding	401	63.55%	224	35.50%	6	0.95%	177	28.05%	631
Hidalgo	1,282	59.32%	860	39.80%	19	0.88%	422	19.52%	2,161
Lea	14,569	75.26%	4,558	23.55%	230	1.19%	10,011	51.71%	19,357
Lincoln	3,992	77.04%	1,134	21.88%	56	1.08%	2,858	55.16%	5,182
Los Alamos	6,882	69.60%	2,859	28.91%	147	1.49%	4,023	40.69%	9,888
Luna	4,145	61.17%	2,557	37.74%	74	1.09%	1,588	23.43%	6,776
McKinley	6,557	44.78%	7,915	54.05%	171	1.17%	-1,358	-9.27%	14,643
Mora	1,017	44.47%	1,235	54.00%	35	1.53%	-218	-9.53%	2,287
Otero	9,751	69.22%	4,167	29.58%	169	1.20%	5,584	39.64%	14,087
Quay	2,842	66.82%	1,368	32.17%	43	1.01%	1,474	34.65%	4,253
Rio Arriba	4,116	36.93%	6,938	62.25%	92	0.82%	-2,822	-25.32%	11,146
Roosevelt	4,598	72.26%	1,696	26.65%	69	1.09%	2,902	45.61%	6,363
San Juan	18,690	66.97%	8,963	32.11%	257	0.92%	9,727	34.86%	27,910
San Miguel	3,485	39.38%	5,227	59.06%	138	1.56%	-1,742	-19.68%	8,850
Sandoval	9,005	55.43%	7,080	43.58%	161	0.99%	1,925	11.85%	16,246
Santa Fe	15,886	45.98%	18,262	52.85%	404	1.17%	-2,376	-6.87%	34,552
Sierra	2,663	66.00%	1,335	33.09%	37	0.91%	1,328	32.91%	4,035
Socorro	3,403	56.27%	2,541	42.01%	104	1.72%	862	14.26%	6,048
Taos	4,154	44.04%	5,144	54.54%	134	1.42%	-990	-10.50%	9,432
Torrance	2,326	64.02%	1,274	35.07%	33	0.91%	1,052	28.95%	3,633
Union	1,503	74.44%	488	24.17%	28	1.39%	1,015	50.27%	2,019
Valencia	8,474	60.32%	5,393	38.39%	182	1.29%	3,081	21.93%	14,049
Totals	307,101	59.70%	201,769	39.23%	5,500	1.07%	105,332	20.47%	514,370

==== Counties that flipped from Republican to Democratic ====
- Grant
- McKinley

=== Results by congressional district ===
Reagan won all 3 congressional districts, including one held by a Democrat.

District	Reagan	Mondale	Representative
1st	60%	39%	Manuel Lujan Jr.
2nd	66%	33%	Joe Skeen
3rd	53%	46%	Bill Richardson

== See also ==
- Presidency of Ronald Reagan
