= 1944 United States presidential election in New Mexico =

- November 7, 1944

Nominee	Franklin D. Roosevelt	Thomas E. Dewey
Party	Democratic	Republican
Home state	New York	New York
Running mate	Harry S. Truman	John W. Bricker
Electoral vote	4	0
Popular vote	81,389	70,688
Percentage	53.47%	46.44%
County results
Roosevelt
50–60%
60–70%
70–80%
Dewey
50–60%
President before election
Franklin D. Roosevelt
Democratic
Elected President
Franklin D. Roosevelt
Democratic

The 1944 United States presidential election in New Mexico took place on November 7, 1944. All forty-eight contemporary States were part of the 1944 United States presidential election. State voters chose four electors to represent them in the Electoral College, which voted for President and Vice President. A larger relative population in New Mexico increased the number of presidential electors from the state to four, from three in the previous election cycle.

New Mexico was won by incumbent President Franklin D. Roosevelt, against Governor of New York Thomas E. Dewey, who was making his first bid for the presidency.

== Results ==
General Election Results
Party	Pledged to	Elector	Votes
Democratic Party	Franklin D. Roosevelt	C. V. Harris	81,389
Democratic Party	Franklin D. Roosevelt	D. E. Rodriguez	81,338
Democratic Party	Franklin D. Roosevelt	Mrs. C. F. Montgomery	81,054
Democratic Party	Franklin D. Roosevelt	Mrs. Leopoldo Gonzales	80,958
Republican Party	Thomas E. Dewey	Manuel Otero	70,688
Republican Party	Thomas E. Dewey	Oliver M. Lee	70,559
Republican Party	Thomas E. Dewey	William B. Dunnam	70,178
Republican Party	Thomas E. Dewey	Mrs. G. A. Feather	70,012
Prohibition Party	Claude A. Watson	Mrs. F. E. Wilson	148
Prohibition Party	Claude A. Watson	S. P. Crouch	147
Prohibition Party	Claude A. Watson	Sarah D. Ulmer	143
Prohibition Party	Claude A. Watson	Q. B. Stanfield	141
Votes cast (Note: Based on totals for highest elector on each ticket)			152,225

=== Results by county ===
County	Franklin D. Roosevelt Democratic		Thomas E. Dewey Republican		Claude A. Watson Prohibition		Margin		Total votes cast (Note: Based on the highest elector on each ticket)
County	#	%	#	%	#	%	#	%	Total votes cast
Bernalillo	12,229	51.16%	11,662	48.79%	13	0.05%	567	2.37%	23,904
Catron	589	45.69%	699	54.23%	1	0.08%	-110	-8.53%	1,289
Chaves	3,350	51.41%	3,149	48.33%	17	0.26%	201	3.08%	6,516
Colfax	3,017	53.07%	2,661	46.81%	7	0.12%	356	6.26%	3,685
Curry	3,271	58.32%	2,326	41.47%	12	0.21%	945	16.85%	5,609
De Baca	660	54.28%	554	45.56%	2	0.16%	106	8.72%	1,216
Doña Ana	4,172	56.94%	3,149	42.98%	6	0.08%	1,023	13.96%	7,327
Eddy	5,228	71.35%	2,083	28.43%	16	0.22%	3,145	42.92%	7,327
Grant	3,472	63.75%	1,970	36.17%	4	0.07%	1,502	27.58%	5,446
Guadalupe	1,539	48.27%	1,649	51.73%	0	0.00%	-110	-3.45%	3,188
Harding	647	44.10%	820	55.90%	0	0.00%	-173	-11.79%	1,467
Hidalgo	807	68.74%	367	31.26%	0	0.00%	440	37.48%	1,174
Lea	2,938	70.49%	1,227	29.44%	3	0.07%	1,711	41.05%	4,168
Lincoln	1,342	47.91%	1,455	51.95%	4	0.14%	-113	-4.03%	2,801
Luna	1,383	56.24%	1,074	43.68%	2	0.08%	309	12.57%	2,459
McKinley	2,210	58.78%	1,547	41.14%	3	0.08%	663	17.63%	3,760
Mora	1,425	44.41%	1,783	55.56%	1	0.03%	-358	-11.16%	3,209
Otero	1,892	56.28%	1,467	43.63%	3	0.09%	425	12.64%	3,362
Quay	2,272	60.88%	1,449	38.83%	11	0.29%	823	22.05%	3,732
Rio Arriba	3,792	51.75%	3,532	48.21%	3	0.04%	260	3.55%	7,327
Roosevelt	2,359	59.44%	1,610	40.56%	0	0.00%	749	18.87%	3,969
San Juan	1,093	43.03%	1,438	56.61%	9	0.35%	-345	-13.58%	2,540
San Miguel	4,684	53.83%	4,014	46.13%	4	0.05%	670	7.70%	8,702
Sandoval	1,354	48.44%	1,439	51.48%	2	0.07%	-85	-3.04%	2,795
Santa Fe	4,915	47.27%	5,482	52.73%	0	0.00%	-567	-5.45%	10,397
Sierra	1,008	47.37%	1,112	52.26%	8	0.38%	-104	-4.89%	2,128
Socorro	1,967	49.18%	2,030	50.75%	3	0.08%	-63	-1.57%	4,000
Taos	2,525	49.67%	2,557	50.30%	2	0.04%	-32	-0.63%	5,084
Torrance	1,438	41.61%	2,014	58.28%	4	0.12%	-576	-16.67%	3,456
Union	1,350	45.62%	1,604	54.21%	5	0.17%	-254	-8.58%	2,959
Valencia	2,461	47.06%	2,765	52.88%	3	0.06%	-304	-5.81%	5,229
Total	81,389	53.47%	70,688	46.44%	148	0.10%	10,701	7.03%	152,225

==== Counties that flipped from Democratic to Republican ====
- Catron
- Guadalupe
- Harding
- Sandoval
- Santa Fe
- Sierra
- Taos
- Union
