= 1948 United States presidential election in New Mexico =

- November 2, 1948

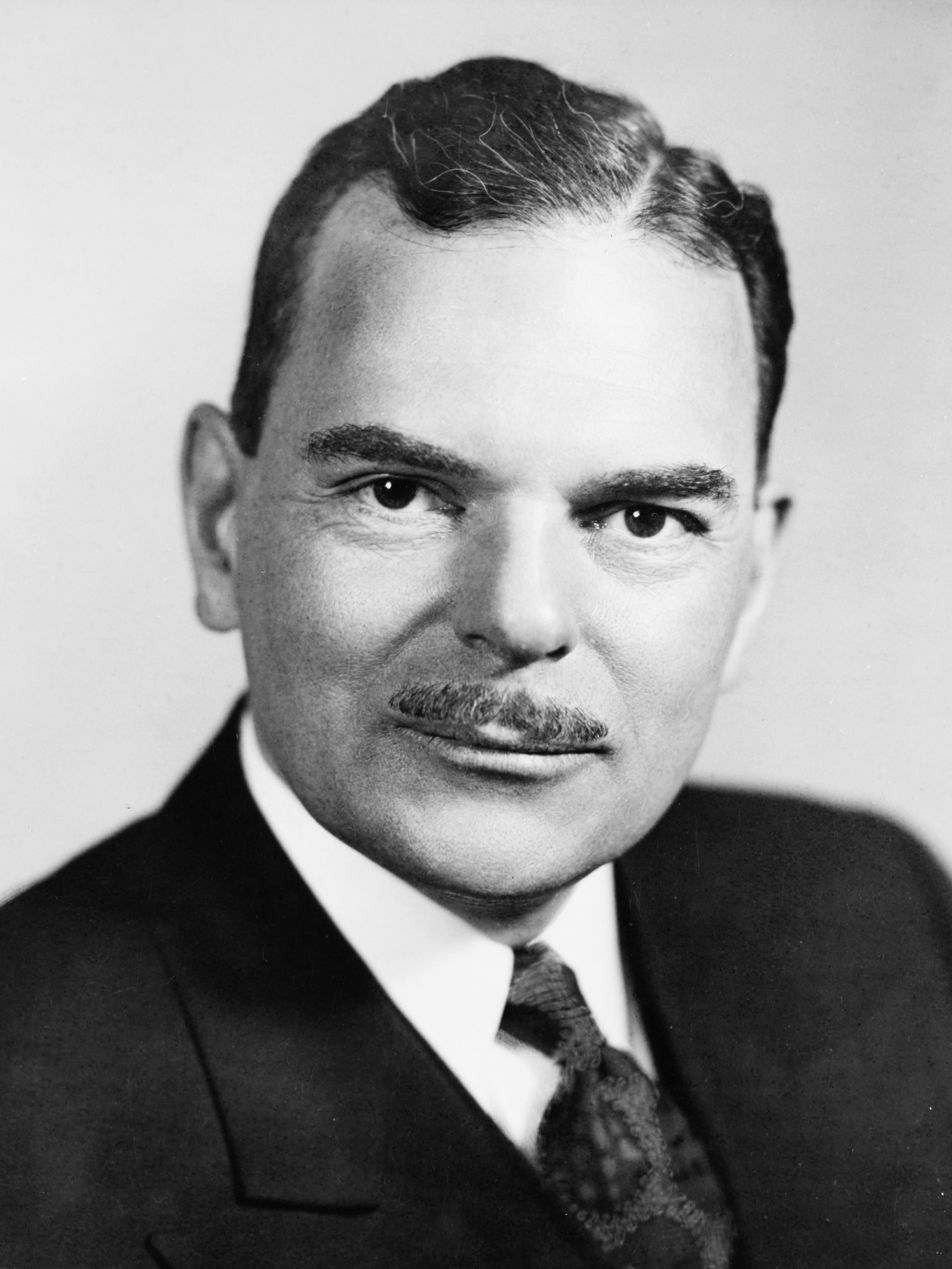
Nominee	Harry S. Truman	Thomas E. Dewey
Party	Democratic	Republican
Home state	Missouri	New York
Running mate	Alben W. Barkley	Earl Warren
Electoral vote	4	0
Popular vote	105,464	80,303
Percentage	56.38%	42.93%
County results
Truman
40–50%
50–60%
60–70%
70–80%
Dewey
50–60%
60–70%

The 1948 United States presidential election in New Mexico took place on November 2, 1948. All 48 states were part of the 1948 United States presidential election. State voters chose four electors to represent them in the Electoral College, which voted for President and Vice President.

New Mexico was won by incumbent President Harry S. Truman, who took the Oval Office after the death of President Franklin D. Roosevelt. Running against Truman was Governor of New York Thomas E. Dewey, who was strongly predicted to win the contest. Dixiecrat candidate Strom Thurmond took portions of the South, but was not even on the ballot in New Mexico and other Western states.

As of the 2024 presidential election, this is the last election in which Union County and Harding County voted for a Democratic presidential candidate and the last until 2020 in which Valencia County voted for a losing candidate.

== Results ==
General Election Results
Party	Pledged to	Elector	Votes
Democratic Party	Harry S. Truman	Luis C. De Baca	105,464
Democratic Party	Harry S. Truman	Max I. Meadors	105,240
Democratic Party	Harry S. Truman	Mrs. W. F. Coe	105,107
Democratic Party	Harry S. Truman	Mrs. Juan N. Vigil	105,031
Republican Party	Thomas E. Dewey	John J. Emmons	80,303
Republican Party	Thomas E. Dewey	Filemon T. Martinez	79,860
Republican Party	Thomas E. Dewey	Jerome O. Eddy	79,760
Republican Party	Thomas E. Dewey	Mrs. Seth Alston	79,659
New Party	Henry A. Wallace	Prospero Jaramillo	1,037
New Party	Henry A. Wallace	Fred Calkins	983
New Party	Henry A. Wallace	Mildred Smothermon	978
New Party	Henry A. Wallace	John C. Waite	956
Prohibition Party	Claude A. Watson	Q. B. Stanfield	127
Prohibition Party	Claude A. Watson	S. P. Crouch	124
Prohibition Party	Claude A. Watson	Sadie E. Evans	122
Prohibition Party	Claude A. Watson	Sarah D. Ulmer	122
Socialist Party	Norman Thomas	Richard Barrett	83
Socialist Party	Norman Thomas	Lee Wright	80
Socialist Party	Norman Thomas	Inez Bushner	77
Socialist Party	Norman Thomas	Cora Amos Walker	77
Socialist Labor Party	Edward A. Teichert	Clifford Oles	49
Socialist Labor Party	Edward A. Teichert	Eleanor Berkman	35
Socialist Labor Party	Edward A. Teichert	Jack I. Berkman	35
Socialist Labor Party	Edward A. Teichert	James William Peach	35
Votes cast (Note: Based on totals for highest elector on each ticket)			187,063

=== Results by county ===
County	Harry S. Truman Democratic		Thomas E. Dewey Republican		Henry A. Wallace New		Claude A. Watson Prohibition		Norman Thomas Socialist		Edward A. Teichert Socialist Labor		Margin		Total votes cast (Note: Based on the highest elector on each ticket)
County	#	%	#	%	#	%	#	%	#	%	#	%	#	%	Total votes cast
Bernalillo	18,305	51.76%	16,668	47.13%	328	0.93%	17	0.05%	31	0.09%	15	0.04%	1,637	4.63%	35,364
Catron	648	55.24%	521	44.42%	3	0.26%	1	0.09%	0	0.00%	0	0.00%	127	10.83%	1,173
Chaves	4,569	59.15%	3,123	40.43%	21	0.27%	8	0.10%	3	0.04%	1	0.01%	1,446	18.72%	7,725
Colfax	3,871	59.74%	2,575	39.74%	25	0.39%	3	0.05%	5	0.08%	1	0.02%	1,296	20.00%	6,480
Curry	5,759	72.52%	2,132	26.85%	43	0.54%	5	0.06%	2	0.03%	0	0.00%	3,627	45.67%	7,941
De Baca	670	59.24%	458	40.50%	2	0.18%	1	0.09%	0	0.00%	0	0.00%	212	18.74%	1,131
Doña Ana	5,116	59.54%	3,440	40.03%	32	0.37%	2	0.02%	2	0.02%	1	0.01%	1,676	19.50%	8,593
Eddy	7,593	75.77%	2,305	23.00%	104	1.04%	8	0.08%	5	0.05%	6	0.06%	5,288	52.77%	10,021
Grant	3,592	62.72%	1,999	34.90%	130	2.27%	2	0.03%	2	0.03%	2	0.03%	1,593	27.82%	5,727
Guadalupe	1,550	49.76%	1,565	50.24%	0	0.00%	0	0.00%	0	0.00%	0	0.00%	-15	-0.48%	3,115
Harding	653	49.96%	649	49.66%	3	0.23%	0	0.00%	1	0.08%	1	0.08%	4	0.31%	1,307
Hidalgo	859	69.16%	374	30.11%	5	0.40%	2	0.16%	0	0.00%	2	0.16%	485	39.05%	1,242
Lea	4,708	78.14%	1,273	21.13%	26	0.43%	16	0.27%	1	0.02%	1	0.02%	3,435	57.01%	6,025
Lincoln	1,406	46.79%	1,575	52.41%	14	0.47%	7	0.23%	2	0.07%	1	0.03%	-169	-5.62%	3,005
Luna	1,629	63.04%	941	36.42%	9	0.35%	4	0.15%	0	0.00%	1	0.04%	688	26.63%	2,584
McKinley	2,995	58.17%	2,109	40.96%	37	0.72%	6	0.12%	1	0.02%	1	0.02%	886	17.21%	5,149
Mora	1,541	44.84%	1,893	55.08%	3	0.09%	0	0.00%	0	0.00%	0	0.00%	-352	-10.24%	3,437
Otero	2,361	63.25%	1,354	36.27%	13	0.35%	3	0.08%	0	0.00%	2	0.05%	1,007	26.98%	3,733
Quay	3,063	68.17%	1,392	30.98%	22	0.49%	13	0.29%	2	0.04%	1	0.02%	1,671	37.19%	4,493
Rio Arriba	4,753	52.56%	4,273	47.25%	16	0.18%	1	0.01%	0	0.00%	0	0.00%	480	5.31%	9,043
Roosevelt	3,087	75.75%	956	23.46%	23	0.56%	8	0.20%	1	0.02%	0	0.00%	2,131	52.29%	4,075
San Juan	1,544	38.94%	2,407	60.71%	8	0.20%	5	0.13%	1	0.03%	0	0.00%	-863	-21.77%	3,965
San Miguel	4,953	51.44%	4,655	48.34%	18	0.19%	0	0.00%	2	0.02%	1	0.01%	298	3.09%	9,629
Sandoval	1,851	52.30%	1,675	47.33%	7	0.20%	1	0.03%	4	0.11%	1	0.03%	176	4.97%	3,539
Santa Fe	6,172	44.95%	7,491	54.56%	55	0.40%	2	0.01%	6	0.04%	5	0.04%	-1,319	-9.61%	13,731
Sierra	1,389	51.83%	1,274	47.54%	13	0.49%	1	0.04%	1	0.04%	2	0.07%	115	4.29%	2,680
Socorro	1,650	43.44%	2,139	56.32%	8	0.21%	0	0.00%	0	0.00%	1	0.03%	-489	-12.88%	3,798
Taos	2,977	50.72%	2,852	48.59%	35	0.60%	0	0.00%	5	0.09%	1	0.02%	125	2.13%	5,870
Torrance	1,696	49.71%	1,709	50.09%	4	0.12%	2	0.06%	1	0.03%	0	0.00%	-13	-0.38%	3,412
Union	1,590	55.81%	1,246	43.73%	7	0.25%	6	0.21%	0	0.00%	0	0.00%	344	12.07%	2,849
Valencia	2,914	46.80%	3,280	52.67%	23	0.37%	3	0.05%	5	0.08%	2	0.03%	-366	-5.88%	6,227
Total	105,464	56.38%	80,303	42.93%	1,037	0.55%	127	0.07%	83	0.04%	49	0.03%	25,161	13.45%	187,063

==== Counties that flipped from Republican to Democratic ====
- Catron
- Harding
- Sandoval
- Sierra
- Taos
- Union

== See also ==
- United States presidential elections in New Mexico
