= 1912 United States presidential election in New Mexico =

- November 5, 1912

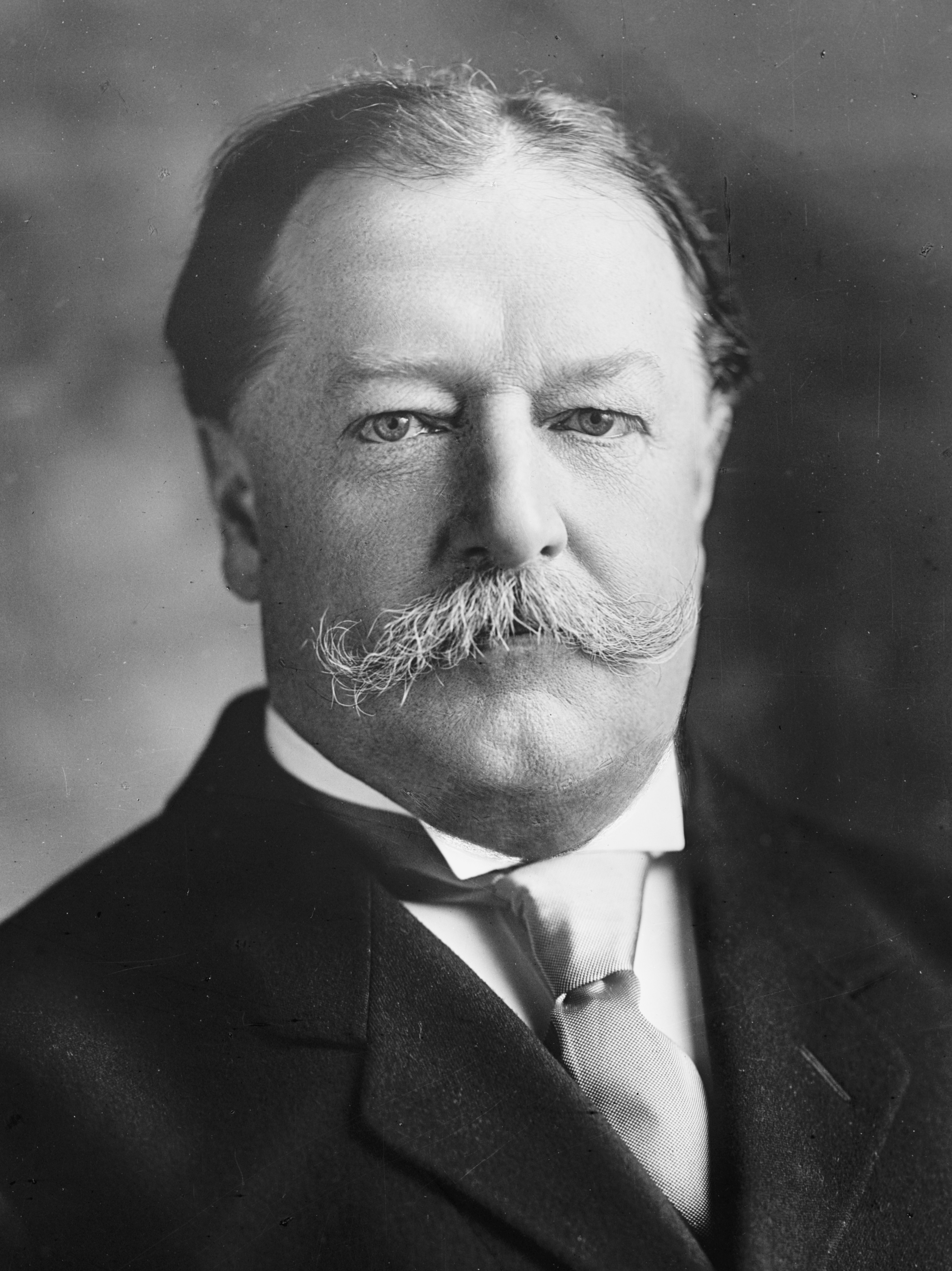

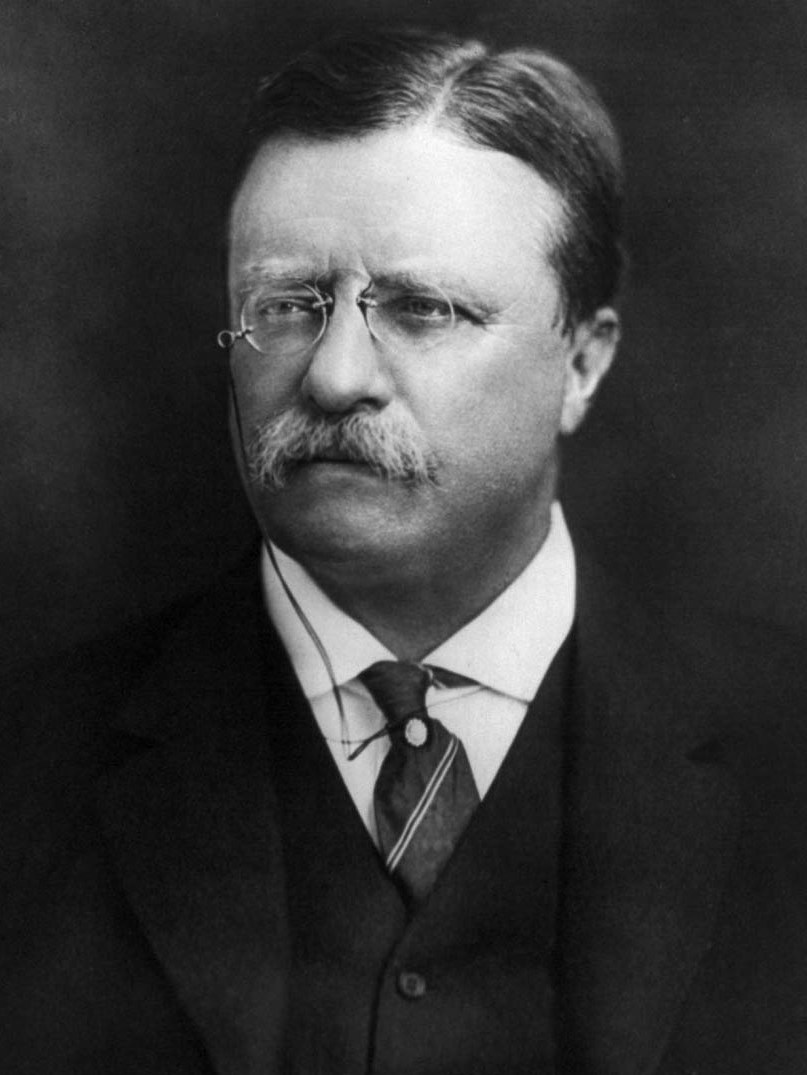

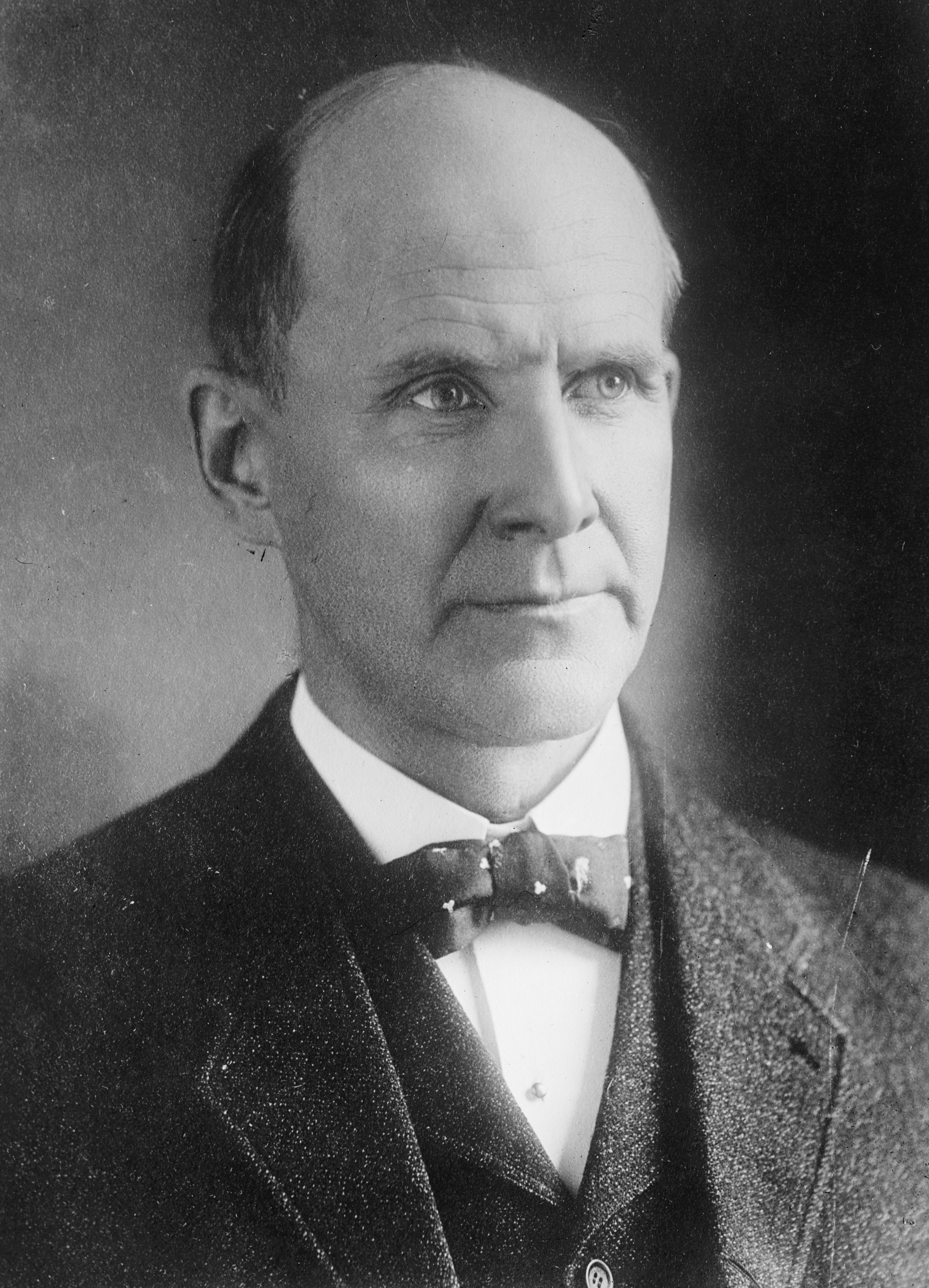
Nominee	Woodrow Wilson	William Howard Taft
Party	Democratic	Republican
Home state	New Jersey	Ohio
Running mate	Thomas R. Marshall	Nicholas Murray Butler
Electoral vote	3	0
Popular vote	20,437	17,733
Percentage	41.39%	35.91%
Nominee	Theodore Roosevelt	Eugene V. Debs
Party	Progressive	Socialist
Home state	New York	Indiana
Running mate	Hiram Johnson	Emil Seidel
Electoral vote	0	0
Popular vote	8,347	2,859
Percentage	16.91%	5.79%
County results
Wilson
40–50%
50–60%
Taft
30–40%
40–50%
50–60%
70–80%
Roosevelt
30–40%
60–70%
President before election
William Howard Taft
Republican
Elected President
Woodrow Wilson
Democratic

The 1912 United States presidential election in New Mexico took place on November 5, 1912, and all contemporary forty-eight states participated as part of the 1912 United States presidential election. Voters chose three electors to represent them in the Electoral College, which voted for President and Vice President.

This was the first presidential election in which New Mexico participated, having been admitted to the union as the 47th state on January 6, 1912. During the period between New Mexico's annexation by the United States and statehood, the area was divided between largely Republican machine-run highland regions and its firmly Southern Democrat and Baptist "Little Texas" region to the southeast. Running for reelection against the reformist policies of Wilson was William H. Taft, who secured the Republican nomination over Theodore Roosevelt. To counter not receiving the Republican nomination, Roosevelt then ran for president under his own Bull-Moose Party.

New Mexico is indicative of this critical split in the industrialist Republican Party, because Wilson was able to attain victory, both in the State and nationally, with about 40% of the vote, due to a split in the "Old Guard" of highland Republicanism. New Mexico was won by New Jersey Governor Woodrow Wilson, in what was perhaps the most politically diverse election in United States history. Nonetheless, New Mexico was still Taft's fourth-strongest state by vote percentage after Utah, New Hampshire and Vermont, reflecting the strong Hispanic machine loyalties to him in the northern highlands. The Socialist Party of America had its best year on record under Socialist Party star Eugene V. Debs, who garnered almost six percent of the electorate in New Mexico, and nationally. Debs ran ahead of Taft in Curry, Eddy and Roosevelt counties.

== Results ==
General Election Results
Party	Pledged to	Elector	Votes
Democratic Party	Woodrow Wilson	E. C. de Baca	20,437
Democratic Party	Woodrow Wilson	S. D. Stennis Jr.	20,108
Democratic Party	Woodrow Wilson	J. H. Latham	19,997
Republican Party	William Howard Taft	Eufracio Gallegos	17,733
Republican Party	William Howard Taft	Matt Fowler	17,258
Republican Party	William Howard Taft	Levi A. Hughes	17,134
Progressive Party	Theodore Roosevelt	George W. Armijo	8,347
Progressive Party	Theodore Roosevelt	Dora F. Thomas	7,787
Progressive Party	Theodore Roosevelt	Elmer E. Studley	7,764
Socialist Party	Eugene V. Debs	Walter Cook	2,859
Socialist Party	Eugene V. Debs	W. T. Holmes	2,859
Socialist Party	Eugene V. Debs	LeRoy Welch	2,856
Votes cast (Note: Based on totals for highest elector on each ticket)			49,375

=== Results by county ===
County	Woodrow Wilson Democratic		William Howard Taft Republican		Theodore Roosevelt Progressive "Bull Moose"		Eugene V. Debs Socialist		Margin		Total votes cast (Note: Based on the highest elector on each ticket)
County	#	%	#	%	#	%	#	%	#	%	Total votes cast
Bernalillo	1,199	31.85%	1,002	26.61%	1,394	37.03%	170	4.52%	-195	-5.18%	3,765
Chaves	1,339	52.53%	465	18.24%	398	15.61%	347	13.61%	874	34.29%	2,549
Colfax	1,182	41.34%	1,036	36.24%	564	19.73%	77	2.69%	146	5.11%	2,859
Curry	634	52.66%	123	10.22%	253	21.01%	194	16.11%	381	31.64%	1,204
Doña Ana	895	43.36%	912	44.19%	241	11.68%	16	0.78%	-17	-0.82%	2,064
Eddy	936	57.85%	145	8.96%	371	22.93%	166	10.26%	565 (Note: In this county where Taft ran third behind Roosevelt, margin given is Wilson vote minus Roosevelt vote, and percentage margin is Wilson percentage minus Roosevelt percentage.)	34.92%	1,618
Grant	1,130	53.33%	439	20.72%	416	19.63%	134	6.32%	691	32.61%	2,119
Guadalupe	761	45.79%	651	39.17%	154	9.27%	96	5.78%	110	6.62%	1,662
Lincoln	461	40.91%	452	40.11%	109	9.67%	105	9.32%	9	0.80%	1,127
Luna	461	56.29%	81	9.89%	194	23.69%	83	10.13%	267	32.60%	819
McKinley	224	30.60%	264	36.07%	237	32.38%	7	0.96%	-27 (Note: In this county where Wilson ran third behind Roosevelt, margin given is Taft vote minus Roosevelt vote and percentage margin Taft percentage minus Roosevelt percentage.)	-3.69%	732
Mora	1,002	42.97%	1,022	43.83%	264	11.32%	44	1.89%	-20	-0.86%	2,332
Otero	420	41.75%	220	21.87%	201	19.98%	165	16.40%	200	19.88%	1,006
Quay	884	47.07%	351	18.69%	358	19.06%	285	15.18%	526	28.01%	1,878
Rio Arriba	1,004	37.76%	1,549	58.25%	101	3.80%	5	0.19%	-545	-20.50%	2,659
Roosevelt	599	49.34%	107	8.81%	299	21.33%	249	20.51%	340	28.01%	1,214
San Juan	493	46.25%	203	19.04%	229	21.48%	141	13.23%	264	24.77%	1,066
San Miguel	1,740	39.07%	2,479	55.67%	207	4.65%	27	0.61%	-739	-16.60%	4,453
Sandoval	126	13.70%	211	22.93%	583	63.37%	0	0.00%	-372	-40.44%	920
Santa Fe	1,012	34.92%	1,432	49.41%	390	13.46%	64	2.21%	-420	-14.49%	2,898
Sierra	352	56.32%	176	28.16%	86	13.76%	11	1.76%	176	28.16%	625
Socorro	1,078	46.33%	960	41.25%	269	11.56%	20	0.86%	118	5.07%	2,327
Taos	765	39.89%	855	44.58%	277	14.44%	21	1.09%	-90	-4.69%	1,918
Torrance	390	29.66%	520	39.54%	232	17.64%	174	13.23%	-130	-9.89%	1,315
Union	1,119	42.86%	815	31.21%	449	17.20%	228	8.73%	304	11.64%	2,611
Valencia	231	14.13%	1,263	77.25%	111	6.79%	30	1.83%	-1,032	-63.12%	1,635
Total	20,437	41.39%	17,733	35.91%	8,347	16.91%	2,859	5.79%	2,704	5.48%	49,375

== See also ==
- United States presidential elections in New Mexico
