= 1940 United States presidential election in New Mexico =

- November 5, 1940

Nominee	Franklin D. Roosevelt	Wendell Willkie
Party	Democratic	Republican
Home state	New York	New York
Running mate	Henry A. Wallace	Charles L. McNary
Electoral vote	3	0
Popular vote	103,699	79,315
Percentage	56.59%	43.28%
County results
Roosevelt
50–60%
60–70%
70–80%
Willkie
50–60%
President before election
Franklin D. Roosevelt
Democratic
Elected President
Franklin D. Roosevelt
Democratic

The 1940 United States presidential election in New Mexico took place on November 5, 1940. All 48 States were part of the 1940 United States presidential election. State voters chose three electors to represent them in the Electoral College, which voted for President and Vice President.

Incumbent Democratic President Franklin D. Roosevelt comfortably won New Mexico by a 13-point margin over Republican businessman Wendell Willkie. This was the only election in United States history where a president was elected to serve a third full term.

== Results ==
General Election Results
Party	Pledged to	Elector	Votes
Democratic Party	Franklin D. Roosevelt	Henry H. Kramer	103,699
Democratic Party	Franklin D. Roosevelt	Mrs. Howard B. Owens	103,211
Democratic Party	Franklin D. Roosevelt	Procopio Torres	102,910
Republican Party	Wendell Willkie	J. Tom Danie	79,315
Republican Party	Wendell Willkie	Manuel Otero	79,302
Republican Party	Wendell Willkie	Mrs. C. Mason	79,022
Socialist Party	Norman Thomas	R. B. Cochran	144
Socialist Party	Norman Thomas	J. E. Ledbetter	143
Socialist Party	Norman Thomas	R. L. Vining	142
Prohibition Party	Roger Babson	M. W. Sides	100
Prohibition Party	Roger Babson	S. P. Crouch	96
Prohibition Party	Roger Babson	C. O. Mardorf	95
Votes cast (Note: Based on totals for highest elector on each ticket)			183,258

=== Results by county ===
County	Franklin D. Roosevelt Democratic		Wendell Willkie Republican		Norman Thomas Socialist		Roger Babson Prohibition		Margin		Total votes cast (Note: Based on the highest elector on each ticket)
County	#	%	#	%	#	%	#	%	#	%	Total votes cast
Bernalillo	14,428	54.53%	11,999	45.35%	28	0.11%	6	0.02%	2,429	9.18%	26,461
Catron	1,039	52.26%	949	47.74%	0	0.00%	0	0.00%	90	4.53%	1,988
Chaves	4,304	58.97%	2,981	40.84%	4	0.05%	10	0.14%	1,323	18.13%	7,299
Colfax	4,234	55.06%	3,452	44.89%	3	0.04%	1	0.01%	782	10.17%	7,690
Curry	4,670	73.90%	1,629	25.78%	12	0.19%	8	0.13%	3,041	48.12%	6,319
De Baca	970	66.94%	479	33.06%	0	0.00%	0	0.00%	491	33.89%	1,449
Doña Ana	5,208	58.28%	3,720	41.63%	6	0.07%	2	0.02%	1,488	16.65%	8,936
Eddy	4,968	75.23%	1,625	24.61%	4	0.06%	7	0.11%	3,343	50.62%	6,604
Grant	3,914	66.00%	2,015	33.98%	1	0.02%	0	0.00%	1,899	32.02%	5,930
Guadalupe	2,082	53.54%	1,807	46.46%	0	0.00%	0	0.00%	275	7.07%	3,889
Harding	1,004	49.93%	998	49.63%	6	0.30%	3	0.15%	6	0.30%	2,011
Hidalgo	1,049	67.03%	516	32.97%	0	0.00%	0	0.00%	533	34.06%	1,565
Lea	4,295	76.81%	1,286	23.00%	6	0.11%	5	0.09%	3,009	53.81%	5,592
Lincoln	1,763	49.38%	1,794	50.25%	3	0.08%	10	0.28%	-31	-0.87%	3,570
Luna	1,388	56.42%	1,066	43.33%	3	0.12%	3	0.12%	322	13.09%	2,460
McKinley	2,525	59.66%	1,701	40.19%	4	0.09%	2	0.05%	824	19.47%	4,232
Mora	1,960	44.54%	2,440	55.44%	1	0.02%	0	0.00%	-480	-10.91%	4,401
Otero	1,788	52.76%	1,596	47.09%	2	0.06%	3	0.09%	192	5.67%	3,389
Quay	3,215	69.14%	1,413	30.39%	12	0.26%	10	0.22%	1,802	38.75%	4,650
Rio Arriba	4,952	53.55%	4,289	46.38%	3	0.03%	3	0.03%	663	7.17%	9,247
Roosevelt	3,190	69.50%	1,384	30.15%	9	0.20%	7	0.15%	1,806	39.35%	4,590
San Juan	1,445	45.06%	1,757	54.79%	4	0.12%	1	0.03%	-312	-9.73%	3,207
San Miguel	6,054	55.32%	4,882	44.61%	4	0.04%	3	0.03%	1,172	10.71%	10,943
Sandoval	2,060	50.85%	1,990	49.12%	1	0.02%	0	0.00%	70	1.73%	4,051
Santa Fe	6,482	50.76%	6,285	49.22%	2	0.02%	1	0.01%	197	1.54%	12,770
Sierra	1,534	52.71%	1,372	47.15%	2	0.07%	2	0.07%	162	5.57%	2,910
Socorro	2,489	47.89%	2,703	52.01%	4	0.08%	1	0.02%	-214	-4.12%	5,197
Taos	3,463	50.85%	3,342	49.07%	3	0.04%	2	0.03%	121	1.78%	6,810
Torrance	1,921	43.28%	2,509	56.52%	5	0.11%	4	0.09%	-588	-13.25%	4,439
Union	1,987	50.96%	1,900	48.73%	7	0.18%	5	0.13%	87	2.23%	3,899
Valencia	3,318	49.08%	3,436	50.83%	5	0.07%	1	0.01%	-118	-1.75%	6,760
Total	103,699	56.59%	79,315	43.28%	144	0.08%	100	0.05%	24,384	13.31%	183,258

==== Counties that flipped from Democratic to Republican ====
- Lincoln
- Mora
- San Juan
- Torrance
- Valencia
