= 1956 United States presidential election in New Mexico =

- November 6, 1956

Nominee	Dwight D. Eisenhower	Adlai Stevenson
Party	Republican	Democratic
Home state	Pennsylvania (Note: Although he was born in Texas and grew up in Kansas before his military career, at the time of the 1952 election Eisenhower was president of Columbia University and was, officially, a resident of New York. During his first term as president, he moved his private residence to Gettysburg, Pennsylvania, and officially changed his residency to Pennsylvania.)	Illinois
Running mate	Richard Nixon	Estes Kefauver
Electoral vote	4	0
Popular vote	146,788	106,098
Percentage	57.81%	41.78%
County results
Eisenhower
40–50%
50–60%
60–70%
Stevenson
50–60%
President before election
Dwight D. Eisenhower
Republican
Elected President
Dwight D. Eisenhower
Republican

The 1956 United States presidential election in New Mexico took place on November 6, 1956. All 48 states were part of the 1956 United States presidential election. State voters chose four electors to represent them in the Electoral College, which voted for President and Vice President.

New Mexico was won by incumbent President Dwight D. Eisenhower by a 16-point landslide. Running against Eisenhower was former Governor of Illinois Adlai Stevenson, whom Eisenhower had earlier defeated for the Presidency in 1952. This election reflected one of the last election cycles where the Democratic Party still had their post Civil War political domination of the Deep South. This was also the last United States presidential election when either major party nominee was born in the nineteenth century.

As of the 2024 presidential election, this is the last election in which Rio Arriba County and San Miguel County voted for a Republican presidential candidate.

== Results ==
1956 United States presidential election in New Mexico
Party	Candidate	Votes	%	±%
Republican	Dwight D. Eisenhower (incumbent); Richard Nixon (incumbent)	146,788	57.81%	+2.42
Democratic	Adlai Stevenson II; Estes Kefauver	106,098	41.78%	−2.50
Prohibition	Enoch A. Holtwick; Edward M. Cooper	607	0.24%	+0.12
Dixiecrat	T. Coleman Andrews; Thomas H. Werdel	364	0.14%	N/A
Socialist Labor	Eric Hass; Georgia Cozzini	69	0.03%	+0.02
Total votes		253,926	100.00%	
Republican win				

=== Results by county ===
County	Dwight D. Eisenhower Republican		Adlai Stevenson Democratic		Various candidates Other parties		Margin		Total votes cast
County	#	%	#	%	#	%	#	%	Total votes cast
Bernalillo	41,893	64.31%	22,954	35.24%	296	0.45%	18,939	29.07%	65,143
Catron	711	59.85%	477	40.15%	0	0.00%	234	19.70%	1,188
Chaves	7,538	63.37%	4,270	35.89%	88	0.74%	3,268	27.48%	11,896
Colfax	2,959	54.71%	2,450	45.29%	0	0.00%	509	9.42%	5,409
Curry	4,826	57.27%	3,545	42.07%	56	0.66%	1,281	15.20%	8,427
De Baca	779	59.33%	528	40.21%	6	0.46%	251	19.12%	1,313
Dona Ana	7,025	58.59%	4,918	41.01%	48	0.40%	2,107	17.58%	11,991
Eddy	6,691	45.77%	7,820	53.50%	107	0.73%	-1,129	-7.73%	14,618
Grant	3,224	43.70%	4,122	55.88%	31	0.42%	-898	-12.18%	7,377
Guadalupe	1,529	56.15%	1,191	43.74%	3	0.11%	338	12.41%	2,723
Harding	671	61.96%	412	38.04%	0	0.00%	259	23.92%	1,083
Hidalgo	790	50.51%	771	49.30%	3	0.19%	19	1.21%	1,564
Lea	5,661	47.66%	6,140	51.69%	78	0.65%	-479	-4.03%	11,879
Lincoln	1,956	64.77%	1,059	35.07%	5	0.16%	897	29.70%	3,020
Los Alamos	2,406	51.98%	2,214	47.83%	9	0.19%	192	4.15%	4,629
Luna	1,526	49.76%	1,506	49.10%	35	1.14%	20	0.66%	3,067
McKinley	4,450	56.97%	3,331	42.64%	30	0.39%	1,119	14.33%	7,811
Mora	1,736	58.47%	1,233	41.53%	0	0.00%	503	16.94%	2,969
Otero	3,919	60.45%	2,558	39.46%	6	0.09%	1,361	20.99%	6,483
Quay	2,311	53.52%	1,988	46.04%	19	0.44%	323	7.48%	4,318
Rio Arriba	4,566	51.53%	4,291	48.43%	3	0.04%	275	3.10%	8,860
Roosevelt	2,708	54.56%	2,247	45.28%	8	0.16%	461	9.28%	4,963
San Juan	5,194	67.54%	2,425	31.53%	71	0.93%	2,769	36.01%	7,690
San Miguel	5,083	55.86%	4,014	44.11%	3	0.03%	1,069	11.75%	9,100
Sandoval	1,979	55.68%	1,574	44.29%	1	0.03%	405	11.39%	3,554
Santa Fe	9,359	56.92%	6,997	42.56%	85	0.52%	2,362	14.36%	16,441
Sierra	1,954	65.00%	1,035	34.43%	17	0.57%	919	30.57%	3,006
Socorro	2,365	61.57%	1,476	38.43%	0	0.00%	889	23.14%	3,841
Taos	3,100	53.02%	2,743	46.91%	4	0.07%	357	6.11%	5,847
Torrance	1,567	56.23%	1,201	43.09%	19	0.68%	366	13.14%	2,787
Union	1,649	60.83%	1,061	39.14%	1	0.03%	588	21.69%	2,711
Valencia	4,663	56.74%	3,547	43.16%	8	0.10%	1,116	13.58%	8,218
Totals	146,788	57.81%	106,098	41.78%	1,040	0.41%	40,690	16.03%	253,926

==== Counties that flipped from Democratic to Republican ====
- Los Alamos
- McKinley
- Rio Arriba
- Taos
