= Mountain View =

Mountain View may refer to:

== Australia ==
- Mountain View, Queensland

== Canada ==
- Mountain View, Alberta
- Mountain View County, Alberta
- Mountain View, Ontario
- Rural Municipality of Mountain View No. 318, Saskatchewan

== South Africa ==
- Mountain View, Johannesburg
- Mountain View, a suburb in the Central Western region of Pretoria

== United States ==
=== California ===
- Mountain View, California
- Magalia, California (or Mountain View)
- Mountain View, Contra Costa County, California
- Mountain View Acres, California

=== New Mexico ===
- Mountain View, Chaves County, New Mexico
- Mountain View, Cibola County, New Mexico
- Mountain View, Luna County, New Mexico

=== Wyoming ===
- Mountain View, Wyoming
- Mountain View, Natrona County, Wyoming

=== Other ===
- Mountain View, Anchorage, Alaska
- Mountain View, Arkansas
- Mountain View, Colorado
- Mountain View, Georgia
- Mountain View, Hawaii
- Mountain View, Missouri
- Mountainview, Mercer County, New Jersey
- Mountain View, North Carolina
- Mountain View, Oklahoma
- Mountain View, Oregon
- Mountain View, El Paso, Texas
- Mountain View, Roanoke, Virginia
- Mountain View, Washington

== Other uses ==
- Mountain View (Morganton, North Carolina), a historic plantation house
- Mountain View (Chatham, Virginia), a historic home
- Mountain View (Roanoke, Virginia), a historic home
- Mountain View, Richmond, a historic home in Richmond, New South Wales, Australia
- Mountain View Homestead and General Store, a historic building in Wisemans Creek, New South Wales, Australia
- Mountain View Park (New Jersey), a park in Middlesex
- Mountain View station (NJ Transit), a New Jersey Transit train station in Wayne
- Mountain View Unit, a prison in Gatesville, Texas

== See also ==
- Overlook, a high place where people can gather to view scenery
- Mountain View at Edinboro
- Mountain View Cemetery (disambiguation)
- Mountain View Elementary School (disambiguation)
- Mountain View Farm (disambiguation)
- Mountain View High School (disambiguation)
- Mountain View Hotel (disambiguation)
- Mountain View, a preserved View series railcar
