= MVHS =

MVHS could mean:

== Health ==
- Mohawk Valley Health System

== Schools ==
- Magna Vista High School
- Mission Vista High School
- Marsh Valley High School
- Mercy Vocational High School
- Merrimack Valley High School
- Metea Valley High School
- Michigan Virtual High School
- Mission Viejo High School
- Moapa Valley High School
- Mountain Valley High School
- Monta Vista High School
- Monte Vista High School (disambiguation)
- Monument Valley High School (disambiguation)
- Mount Vernon High School (disambiguation)
- Mount View High School (disambiguation)
- Mountain View High School (disambiguation)
- Mountain Vista High School
- Murrieta Valley High School
- Minisink Valley High School
