= Monte Vista =

Monte Vista may refer to

== Places ==
- Monte Vista (Hong Kong), a private housing estate in Ma On Shan, Hong Kong
- Montevista, Davao de Oro, Philippines
- Monte Vista, Western Cape, South Africa

=== United States ===
- Monte Vista, California (disambiguation)
  - Monte Vista, Placer County, California
- Monte Vista, Colorado, a city located in Rio Grande County
- Monte Vista Historic District, neighborhood in Midtown San Antonio, Texas
- Monte Vista National Wildlife Refuge, a National Wildlife Refuge in southern Colorado

== Other uses ==
- Monte Vista (Middletown, Virginia), a house listed on the National Register of Historic Places
- Monte Vista (Philadelphia, Pennsylvania), an apartment complex listed on the National Register of Historic Places
- Monte Vista Christian School, in Watsonville, California, U.S.
- Monte Vista High School (disambiguation)
- Monte Vista Hotel (disambiguation)
