= New Mexico State Road 143 =

Highway in New Mexico

State Road 143
- Stirrup Road

Route information
- Maintained by NMDOT
- Length: 6.135 mi (9.873 km)
- Existed: 1988–present

Major junctions
- North end: NM 549 near Deming
- South end: Rockhound State Park

Location
- Country: United States
- State: New Mexico
- Counties: Luna

Highway system
- New Mexico State Highway System; Interstate; US; State; Scenic
← NM 142	→ NM 144

State Road 143 (NM 143) is a 6.135-mile-long (9.873 km), paved, two-lane state highway in Luna County in the U.S. state of New Mexico. NM 143's northern terminus is east of Deming at the road's junction with NM 549. The road's southern terminus is at the entrance to the Rockhound State Park. NM 143 is also known as Stirrup Road.

== Route description ==
NM 143 begins at the junction with NM 549 in the unincorporated area east of the city of Deming. The road starts out by heading straight south through the arid desert, skirting the Little Florida Mountains from the west, while the Dragon Ridge of the Florida Mountains can be clearly seen to the south. After approximately 3.7 miles (6.0 km) the highway intersects former state road NM 141, an original access road to the Rockhound State Park. Shortly after the junction, the highway turns southeast, and travels through an unincorporated sparsely populated community for approximately 1.5 miles (2.4 km) before turning east. NM 198 forks right at roughly 5.5 miles (8.9 km) mark, and NM 143 turns northeasterly before reaching the entrance of the Rockhound State Park in the southern part of Little Florida Mountains.

== History ==
After Rockhound State Park was formed in 1966, a road was built connecting it to NM 11 south of Deming. At some point this road became known as NM 141. The road connecting US 80 to ranching communities southeast of Deming was known as Luna County Road B 026. On July 1, 1988 a road exchange agreement was signed between the NMDOT and Luna County which transferred the County Roads B 023 and B 026 to the state. The former county roads were broken up into several segments to avoid road concurrency, with the stretch between the former US 80 (which was redesignated as NM 549) and a three-way junction with NM 497 and NM 141 became known as NM 143. NM 141 was removed from the state control some time after 2000, and NM 497 was consolidated with NM 143 into a single road.

== Major intersections ==
The entire route is in Luna County.

Location	mi	km	Destinations	Notes
	0.000	0.000	NM 549 – Deming	Northern terminus
	3.681	5.924	Rockhound Road	Eastern terminus of former NM 141
	5.554	8.938	NM 198 south – Spring Canyon State Park	Northern terminus of NM 198
	6.135	9.873	Rockhound State Park	Southern terminus
1.000 mi = 1.609 km; 1.000 km = 0.621 mi
