= New Mexico State Road 198 =

Highway in New Mexico

State Road 198
- Spring Canyon Road

Route information
- Maintained by NMDOT
- Length: 2.657 mi (4.276 km)
- Existed: 1988–present

Major junctions
- South end: Spring Canyon State Park
- North end: NM 143 near Deming

Location
- Country: United States
- State: New Mexico
- Counties: Luna

Highway system
- New Mexico State Highway System; Interstate; US; State; Scenic
← NM 197	→ NM 199

State Road 198 (NM 198) is a 2.657-mile-long (4.276 km), paved, two-lane state highway in Luna County in the U.S. state of New Mexico. NM 198's southern terminus is at the entrance to the Spring Canyon State Park, and the northern terminus is southeast of Deming at the road's junction with NM 143, just west of the Rockhound State Park. NM 198 is also known as Spring Canyon Road.

== Route description ==
NM 198 begins at the junction with NM 143 in the unincorporated area southeast of the city of Deming. The road starts out by heading southeast through the arid desert, skirting the Little Florida Mountains from the west. After approximately 0.7 miles (1.1 km) the highway turns south, travels for about half a mile before making a sharp right-to-left turn. Continuing south the road goes over a side of Castle Rock at a 2-mile mark, makes another sharp right-to-left turn and arrives at the entrance of the Spring Canyon State Park at the mouth of the Spring Canyon in the northern part of Florida Mountains.

== History ==
After Rockhound State Park was formed in 1966, a road was built connecting it to NM 11 south of Deming. Over time, a road was also built forking right from the main park access road, this road became known as Luna County Road B 023. On July 1, 1988 a road exchange agreement was signed between the NMDOT and Luna County which transferred the County Roads B 023 and B 026 to the state. The former county roads were broken up into several segments to avoid road concurrency, with the stretch between the entrance to the Rockhound State Park and Spring Canyon State Park being designated as NM 198. The other segments of the road became known as NM 143 and NM 497, which was later consolidated with NM 143.

== Major intersections ==
The entire route is in Luna County.

Location	mi	km	Destinations	Notes
	0.000	0.000	Spring Canyon State Park	Southern terminus
	2.657	4.276	NM 143	Northern terminus
1.000 mi = 1.609 km; 1.000 km = 0.621 mi
