= Mountain View Hotel =

Mountain View Hotel may refer to:

- Mountain View Hotel (Gatlinburg, Tennessee), formerly listed on the National Register of Historic Places in Sevier County, Tennessee
- Mountain View Hotel (Centennial, Wyoming), listed on the National Register of Historic Places in Albany County, Wyoming
- Mountain View Country Inn (Lady Grey), an old hotel in the main street of Lady Grey, Eastern Cape, South Africa
- Elk Mountain Hotel in Elk Mountain, Wyoming, and at one time known as Mountain View Hotel
