= Old Town, New Mexico =

- Census-designated place
- Location within New Mexico Location within the United States
- Coordinates: 32°29′42″N 107°55′41″W
- Country: United States
- State: New Mexico
- County: Luna

Area
  - Total: 12.74 sq mi (33.00 km^{2})
  - Land: 12.74 sq mi (33.00 km^{2})
  - Water: 0 sq mi (0.00 km^{2})
- Elevation: 4,862 ft (1,482 m)

Population (2020)
  - Total: 27
  - Density: 2.1/sq mi (0.82/km^{2})
- Time zone: UTC-7 (Mountain (MST))
  - Summer (DST): UTC-6 (MDT)
- ZIP Code: 88030 (Deming)
- Area code: 575
- FIPS code: 35-54097
- GNIS feature ID: 2806706

Old Town is a census-designated place (CDP) in Luna County, New Mexico, United States. It was first listed as a CDP prior to the 2020 census.

As of the 2020 census, Old Town had a population of 27.

The community is on the northern edge of the county, bordered to the north and west by Grant County. It sits on both sides of the Mimbres River as it flows southward towards Deming, the Luna county seat. U.S. Route 180 forms the southern edge of the CDP; the highway leads southeast 17 miles (27 km) to Deming and northwest 36 miles (58 km) to Silver City.

Like other areas in Luna County, it is in the Deming Public Schools school district.

== Demographics ==
Historical population
Census	Pop.	Note	%±
2020	27		—
U.S. Decennial Census
