= Mountainview =

Mountainview may refer to:

- Auburn Mountainview High School, a senior high school in Auburn, Washington, United States
- Camp Mountainview, a Salvation Army camp near Houston in British Columbia, Canada
- Mountainview College, a community of residence halls at Binghamton University
- Mountainview High School, a co-educational state high school in Timaru, New Zealand
- Mountainview Montessori School, a public elementary school in Surrey, British Columbia, Canada
- Mountainview (electoral district), a territorial district in the Yukon.
- Mountainview, Mercer County, New Jersey, an unincorporated community in the United States.

== See also ==
- Mountain View (disambiguation)
