= City of the Sun, New Mexico =

- Census-designated place
- Location within New Mexico Location within the United States
- Coordinates: 31°50′48″N 107°39′01″W
- Country: United States
- State: New Mexico
- County: Luna

Area
  - Total: 0.25 sq mi (0.66 km^{2})
  - Land: 0.25 sq mi (0.66 km^{2})
  - Water: 0 sq mi (0.00 km^{2})
- Elevation: 4,141 ft (1,262 m)

Population (2020)
  - Total: 33
  - Density: 130.4/sq mi (50.33/km^{2})
- Time zone: UTC-7 (Mountain (MST))
  - Summer (DST): UTC-6 (MDT)
- Area code: 575
- GNIS feature ID: 2584077

City of the Sun is an intentional community and census-designated place in Luna County, New Mexico, United States. Its population was 33 as of the 2020 census. The community, which is on the northern border of Columbus, was founded in 1972.

Like other areas in Luna County, the community is in the Deming Public Schools school district.

== Demographics ==
Historical population
Census	Pop.	Note	%±
2020	33		—
U.S. Decennial Census
