= New Mexico State Road 418 =

Highway in New Mexico

State Road 418
- NM 418 highlighted in red

Route information
- Maintained by NMDOT
- Length: 14.047 mi (22.606 km)
- Existed: Early 1950s–present
- History: Most of the route is a former section of US 70 and US 80

Major junctions
- West end: I-10 / US 70 at exit 68
- NM 427 in Deming
- East end: I-10 BL in Deming

Location
- Country: United States
- State: New Mexico
- Counties: Luna

Highway system
- New Mexico State Highway System; Interstate; US; State; Scenic
← NM 417	→ NM 419

New Mexico State Road 418 (NM 418) is a 14-mile-long (23 km) state-maintained highway in the southwestern corner of New Mexico, running from Interstate 10 (I-10) to an intersection with Spruce Street in Deming. Originally, NM 418 was a section of U.S. Route 80 (US 80), a transcontinental highway running from San Diego, California, to Tybee Island, Georgia, but was bypassed when a new section of US 80 (now I-10) was built between the current western terminus of NM 418 and Pine Street in Deming.

== Route description ==
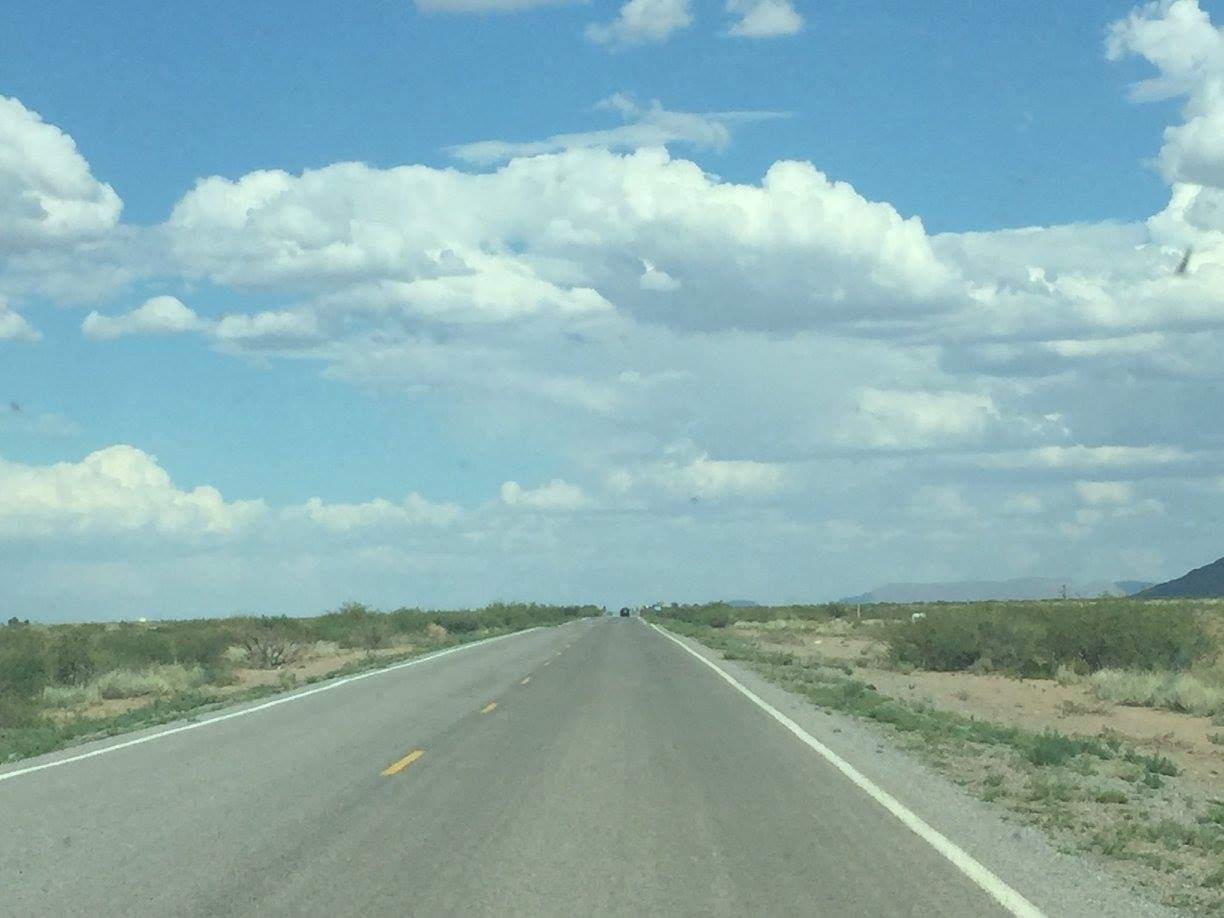
Eastbound NM 418 heading towards Deming.

NM 418 is a short highway of only 14 miles (23 km) between I-10 near Gage and Spruce Street in Deming. The road starts at the north fence of the I-10 right of way at the interchange of exit 68. The highway travels south for a short distance then immediately east through rural Luna County intersecting with former NM 331 at Hermanas Road. This intersection was formerly the western terminus of NM 418. NM 418 continuing east was formerly part of NM 331. At Doña Ana Road and County Road 61, NM 418 swings to the northeast. The highway then passes the western terminus of NM 427, which is known as Florida Street through Deming. NM 418 enters the urban area of Deming at the intersection of 15th Street. Through the western part of Deming, NM 418 cuts a diagonal path through several residential intersections before reaching an intersection with Spruce Street. When NM 418 was still part of US 80, the highway continued on a sweeping curve that merged into Spruce Street rather than the T-shaped intersection that exists today. From there US 80 would have continued east on Spruce Street, later I-10 Business and NM 549 towards Las Cruces. NM 418 continues past this intersection, taking a short jog east on Spruce Street, before turning north on to 9th Street, reaching I-10 Business (Pine Street), where the highway reaches its current eastern terminus. Pine Street is also a later routing of US 80 through Deming.

== History ==
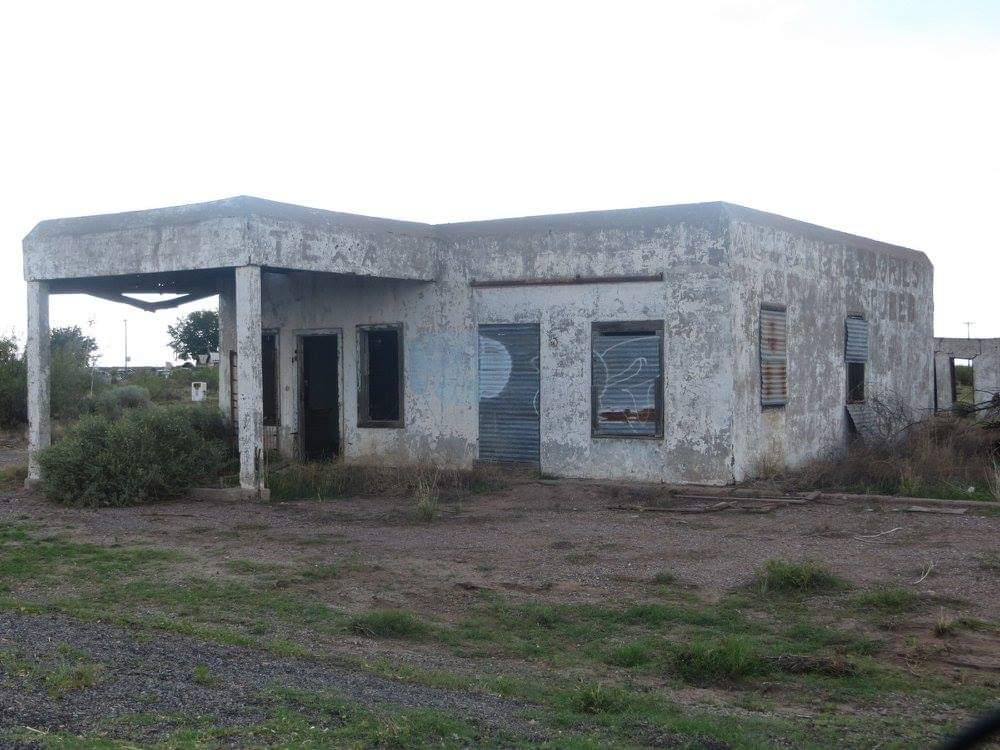
An old Texaco station, now abandoned on the side of NM 418 (former US 70 and US 80).

In 1903, the New Mexico Territorial Legislative Assembly and Territorial Roads Commission established New Mexico Territorial Road 4, which became New Mexico State Road 4 in 1913. NM 4 ran from Rodeo through Lordsburg and Deming to NM 1 in Las Cruces. NM 4 was designated as part of the Dixie Overland Highway auto trail in 1917. The Dixie Overland Highway was the first marked route to run between Savannah, Georgia and southern California. The auto trail entered New Mexico through El Paso, Texas, then traveled north to Mesilla Park where it turned west to Deming, Lorsburg and Steins, before heading south into Rodeo and southwest into Arizona towards Douglas. By 1920, the Bankhead Highway also followed the majority of this route, further joined by the Old Spanish Trail in 1923. On November 11, 1926, the highway was added to the newly created U.S. Highway System as U.S. Route 80.

US 80 followed much of the same routing as the previous auto trails, but turned west at Las Cruces instead of Mesilla Park. Between 1930 and 1931, the highway between Deming and Gage was rebuilt onto a straighter diagonally shaped alignment, which remains the path NM 418 takes today. The original 90 degree shape the route took is now part of Doňa Ana Road and 8th Street. In 1935, US 70 was extended west from Clovis to Los Angeles, California, becoming concurrent with US 80 between Las Cruces and Lordsburg. US 70 and US 80 would continue to use this alignment well into the 1950s. By 1956, US 70 and US 80 were placed on a new alignment further north. The new alignment was later rebuilt into a section of Interstate 10 between Gage and Pine Street in Deming. In 1989, US 80 was decommissioned from most of New Mexico. The remainder of the highway was removed from the state in 1991. US 70 on the other hand was never removed from New Mexico and still runs through Las Cruces, Deming and Lordsburg to Arizona. The bypassed 1931 route was at first re-designated as the entirety of NM 418 and a northern extension of NM 331. NM 418 originally ran from US 70/US 80 (later I-10) to an intersection with NM 331. The remainder of the route to Deming was served by NM 331. By 1996, NM 331 had been truncated to its junction with NM 418 while the latter route had been extended along the former route of NM 331 to Spruce Street in Deming.

== Major intersections ==
The entire route is in Luna County.

Location	mi	km	Destinations	Notes
	0.000	0.000	I-10 / US 70 – Lordsburg	Western terminus; I-10 exit 68
Deming	13.129	21.129	NM 427 east (Florida Street)	Western terminus of NM 427
Deming	14.047	22.606	I-10 BL (Pine Street)	Eastern terminus; former US 70/US 80
1.000 mi = 1.609 km; 1.000 km = 0.621 mi
