= Ventura, New Mexico =

- Census-designated place
- Location within New Mexico Location within the United States
- Coordinates: 32°14′52″N 107°41′00″W
- Country: United States
- State: New Mexico
- County: Luna

Area
  - Total: 5.46 sq mi (14.14 km^{2})
  - Land: 5.46 sq mi (14.14 km^{2})
  - Water: 0 sq mi (0.00 km^{2})
- Elevation: 4,262 ft (1,299 m)

Population (2020)
  - Total: 535
  - Density: 98.0/sq mi (37.83/km^{2})
- Time zone: UTC-7 (Mountain (MST))
  - Summer (DST): UTC-6 (MDT)
- Area code: 575
- GNIS feature ID: 2584232

Ventura is a census-designated place in Luna County, New Mexico, United States. As of the 2020 census, Ventura had a population of 535.

== Geography ==
According to the U.S. Census Bureau, the community has an area of 5.463 square miles (14.15 km^{2}), all land.

== Demographics ==
Historical population
Census	Pop.	Note	%±
2020	535		—
U.S. Decennial Census

== Education ==
Like other areas in Luna County, the community is in the Deming Public Schools school district.
