= Pecan Park, New Mexico =

- Census-designated place
- Location within New Mexico Location within the United States
- Coordinates: 32°16′14″N 107°40′26″W
- Country: United States
- State: New Mexico
- County: Luna

Area
  - Total: 0.11 sq mi (0.28 km^{2})
  - Land: 0.11 sq mi (0.28 km^{2})
  - Water: 0 sq mi (0.00 km^{2})
- Elevation: 4,269 ft (1,301 m)

Population (2020)
  - Total: 113
  - Density: 1,051.6/sq mi (406.02/km^{2})
- Time zone: UTC-7 (Mountain (MST))
  - Summer (DST): UTC-6 (MDT)
- Area code: 575
- GNIS feature ID: 2584175

Pecan Park is a census-designated place in Luna County, New Mexico, United States. As of the 2020 census, Pecan Park had a population of 113.

Like other areas in Luna County, the community is in the Deming Public Schools school district.

== Demographics ==
Historical population
Census	Pop.	Note	%±
2020	113		—
U.S. Decennial Census
