= La Hacienda, New Mexico =

- Census-designated place
- Location within New Mexico Location within the United States
- Coordinates: 32°12′22″N 107°43′30″W
- Country: United States
- State: New Mexico
- County: Luna

Area
  - Total: 1.35 sq mi (3.50 km^{2})
  - Land: 1.35 sq mi (3.50 km^{2})
  - Water: 0 sq mi (0.00 km^{2})
- Elevation: 4,275 ft (1,303 m)

Population (2020)
  - Total: 710
  - Density: 524.8/sq mi (202.62/km^{2})
- Time zone: UTC-7 (Mountain (MST))
  - Summer (DST): UTC-6 (MDT)
- Area code: 575
- GNIS feature ID: 2584124

La Hacienda is a census-designated place in Luna County, New Mexico, United States. As of the 2020 census, La Hacienda had a population of 710.

Like other areas in Luna County, the community is in the Deming Public Schools school district.

== Demographics ==
Historical population
Census	Pop.	Note	%±
2020	710		—
U.S. Decennial Census
