= Keeler Farm, New Mexico =

- Census-designated place
- Location within New Mexico Location within the United States
- Coordinates: 32°18′42″N 107°44′55″W
- Country: United States
- State: New Mexico
- County: Luna

Area
  - Total: 11.39 sq mi (29.50 km^{2})
  - Land: 11.39 sq mi (29.50 km^{2})
  - Water: 0 sq mi (0.00 km^{2})
- Elevation: 4,400 ft (1,300 m)

Population (2020)
  - Total: 1,146
  - Density: 100.6/sq mi (38.85/km^{2})
- Time zone: UTC-7 (Mountain (MST))
  - Summer (DST): UTC-6 (MDT)
- Area code: 575
- GNIS feature ID: 2584117

Keeler Farm is a census-designated place in Luna County, New Mexico, United States. As of the 2020 census, Keeler Farm had a population of 1,146.

Like other areas in Luna County, the community is in the Deming Public Schools school district.

== Demographics ==
Historical population
Census	Pop.	Note	%±
2020	1,146		—
U.S. Decennial Census
