= Pulpotio Bareas, New Mexico =

- Census-designated place
- Location within New Mexico Location within the United States
- Coordinates: 32°13′04″N 107°46′22″W
- Country: United States
- State: New Mexico
- County: Luna

Area
  - Total: 0.52 sq mi (1.34 km^{2})
  - Land: 0.52 sq mi (1.34 km^{2})
  - Water: 0 sq mi (0.00 km^{2})
- Elevation 9: 4,321 ft (1,317 m)

Population (2020)
  - Total: 153
  - Density: 296.5/sq mi (114.46/km^{2})
- Time zone: UTC-7 (Mountain (MST))
  - Summer (DST): UTC-6 (MDT)
- Area code: 575
- GNIS feature ID: 2584189

Pulpotio Bareas is a census-designated place in Luna County, New Mexico, United States. As of the 2020 census, Pulpotio Bareas had a population of 153.

== Geography ==
According to the U.S. Census Bureau, the community has an area of 0.516 square miles (1.34 km^{2}), all land.

== Demographics ==
Historical population
Census	Pop.	Note	%±
2020	153		—
U.S. Decennial Census

== Education ==
Like other areas in Luna County, the community is in the Deming Public Schools school district.
