= Grand View Hotel (disambiguation) =

Grand View Hotel may refer to:

- Grand View Hotel, in Cleveland, Queensland
- Elk Mountain Hotel in Elk Mountain, Wyoming, listed on the National Register of Historic Places in Carbon County, Wyoming and at one time known as Grandview Hotel
