= Mountain View High School =

Mountain View High School or Mountainview High School may refer to:

== New Zealand ==
- Mountainview High School (New Zealand), Timaru, New Zealand

== United States ==
- Mountain View High School (Pima County, Arizona), Tucson, Arizona
- Mountain View High School (Mesa, Arizona), Mesa, Arizona
- Mountain View High School (Arkansas), Mountain View, Arkansas
- Mountain View High School (El Monte, California), El Monte, California
- Mountain View High School (Mountain View, California), Mountain View, California
- Mountain View High School (Colorado), Loveland, Colorado
- Mountain View High School (Georgia), Lawrenceville, Georgia
- Mountain View High School (Idaho), Meridian, Idaho
- Mountain View High School (Bend, Oregon), Bend, Oregon
- Mountain View High School (Texas), El Paso, Texas
- Mountain View High School (Utah), Orem, Utah
- Mountain View High School (Shenandoah County, Virginia), Quicksburg, Virginia
- Mountain View High School (Stafford, Virginia), Stafford, Virginia
- Mountain View Alternative High School, Centreville, Virginia
- Auburn Mountainview High School, Auburn, Washington
- Mountain View High School (Washington), Vancouver, Washington
- Mountain View High School (Wyoming), Mountain View, Wyoming

== See also ==
- Mount View High School (disambiguation)
- Mountain View Elementary School (disambiguation)
- Mountain View (disambiguation)
