= Monte Vista Hotel (disambiguation) =

Monte Vista Hotel was a hotel in Sunland, California that existed from 1887 to 1964.

Monte Vista Hotel or Hotel Monte Vista may refer to:

- Hotel Monte Vista, in Flagstaff, Arizona
- Monte Vista Hotel (Black Mountain, North Carolina)

== See also ==
- Monte Vista (disambiguation)
