= Wisemans Creek, New South Wales =

Wisemans Creek New South Wales
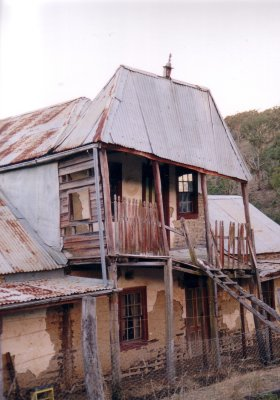
- Mountain View Homestead and General Store

- Coordinates: 33°37′00″S 149°43′00″E
- Population: 113 (2016 census)
- Postcode(s): 2795
- Elevation: 763 m (2,503 ft)
- Location: 190 km (118 mi) W of Sydney; 33 km (21 mi) SSE of Bathurst; 67 km (42 mi) WSW of Lithgow; 21 km (13 mi) NW of Oberon
- LGA(s): Oberon Shire
- State electorate(s): Bathurst
- Federal division(s): Calare
Localities around Wisemans Creek:
Brewongle	O'Connell	Locksley
Tannas Mount	Wisemans Creek	Hazelgrove
Charlton	Essington	Oberon

Wisemans Creek is a locality in the Oberon Shire of New South Wales, Australia. The area has also been known as Glenburn. It had a population of 113 people as of the 2016 census.

Wisemans Creek Post Office opened on 1 January 1886 and closed on 30 June 1976. Wisemans Creek Provisional School operated from September 1868 to September 1870. It also formerly had a cricket club, debating society and bushfire brigade.

The area has historically been used for mining of copper and gold. The Black Bullock mine was worked successfully by Windsor Resources during the 1980s and was subject to ongoing drilling from a joint venture in the 1990s; it was still being viewed as a prospect by Heron Resources in 2017.

In June 1970, it was proposed to remove the Wisemans Creek name and refer to the area as Glenburn; however, this was reversed in August that year.

== Heritage listings ==
Wisemans Creek has a number of heritage-listed sites, including:

- 279 Todds Road: Mountain View Homestead and General Store
