= New Mexico State Road 377 =

State highway in New Mexico, US

State Road 377

Route information
- Maintained by NMDOT
- Length: 1.877 mi (3.021 km)

Major junctions
- West end: NM 549 near Deming
- East end: End of state maintenance near Deming

Location
- Country: United States
- State: New Mexico
- Counties: Luna

Highway system
- New Mexico State Highway System; Interstate; US; State; Scenic
← NM 375	→ NM 378

State Road 377 (NM 377) is a 1.877-mile-long (3.021 km) state highway in the US state of New Mexico. NM 377's western terminus is at NM 549 east of Deming, and the eastern terminus is at the end of state maintenance at the east end of the bridge over the Mimbres River east of Deming.

== History ==
The portion from the Mimbres River bridge eastward was transferred to Luna County on August 19, 1999.

== Major intersections ==
The entire route is in Luna County.

Location	mi	km	Destinations	Notes
	0.000	0.000	NM 549	Western terminus
	1.877	3.021	End of state maintenance	Eastern terminus
1.000 mi = 1.609 km; 1.000 km = 0.621 mi
