= Mimbres, Luna County, New Mexico =

Mimbres
- Unincorporated community
- Location within New Mexico
- Coordinates: 31°48′2″N 107°45′16″W
- Country: United States
- State: New Mexico
- County: Luna
- Elevation: 4,347 ft (1,325 m)
- Time zone: UTC-7 (Mountain (MST))
  - Summer (DST): UTC-6 (MDT)
- Area code: 575
- GNIS feature ID: 898575

Mimbres was an unincorporated community in Luna County, New Mexico, United States.
