= New Mexico State Road 549 =

Highway in New Mexico

State Road 549
- NM 549 highlighted in red

Route information
- Maintained by NMDOT
- Length: 31.430 mi (50.582 km)
- Existed: 1988–present
- History: The entire highway is a former section of US 70 and US 80

Major junctions
- West end: I-10 BL in Deming
- East end: I-10 near Burris

Location
- Country: United States
- State: New Mexico
- Counties: Luna, Doña Ana

Highway system
- New Mexico State Highway System; Interstate; US; State; Scenic
← NM 547	→ US 550

State Road 549 (NM 549) is a 31.430-mile-long (50.582 km), paved state highway in Luna and Doña Ana counties in the U.S. state of New Mexico. NM 549's western terminus is within the city of Deming at the road's junction with I-10 Business. The road's eastern terminus is at the junction with I-10 west of Burris.

== Route description ==
NM 549 largely follows the path of the old US 80 built in late 1920-early 1930s. NM 549 begins at the junction with I-10 Business (Business Loop 22) on the Deming's east side as a four-lane, divided highway, right across from the Deming Municipal Airport. The road starts out by heading east for about 0.35 miles (0.56 km) before turning southeast, and intersecting NM 377. The road travels through unincorporated residential area and passes by St Clair Winery at a 3-mile mark. Continuing southeast the road intersects NM 143 at which point the highway is reduced to two lanes. The road slowly turns east, skirting the Little Florida Mountains from the north, and for the next 11 miles (18 km) traverses sparsely populated desert plains, passing by occasional agricultural fields, ranches and BLM-owned land. Eventually NM 549 converges on I-10 then passes by Arroyo Seco Motorplex and an interchange with I-10 near ghost town of Akela. From this point, NM 549 continues following I-10 for approximately 2.5 miles (4.0 km) before reaching the railroad tracks of the Union Pacific Railway. The highway turns sharply to the southeast and continues shadowing the railroad for the next 3.5 miles (5.6 km) until it makes another sharp turn to the northeast and crosses the adjacent tracks of the Union Pacific Railway over a 229.0-foot-long (69.8 m) timber bridge, built in 1930, near the community of Cambray. The highway continues travelling northeast through the arid desert for about 7 miles (11 km) before reaching its eastern terminus at the juncture with Frontage Road (FR 1028) on the south side of the I-10 exit 116 interchange.

== History ==
The road occupied by the modern day NM 549 is largely a segment of the old highway US 80 built in the 1930s. In the 1950s and 1960s, sections of US 70/US 80 east of Deming were improved and widened in anticipation of future I-10 being routed through them. However, when I-10 was finally built, it was routed farther north, largely following the tracks of the Union Pacific Railway all the way to Deming. In 1988, NMDOT went through a radical road renumbering program, and a stretch of US 80 between Deming and an I-10 interchange near Akela was designated as NM 549. In the 1990s, the highway was extended farther east over the remaining section of US 80 all the way to exit 116 of I-10. In 1991, old US 80 was completely decommissioned by the state of New Mexico.

== Major intersections ==
County	Location	mi	km	Destinations	Notes
Luna	Deming	0.000	0.000	I-10 BL – Deming	Western terminus
Luna	Deming	1.780	2.865	NM 377 east	Western terminus of NM 377
Luna	Deming	4.165	6.703	NM 143 south – Rockhound State Park	Northern terminus of NM 143
Luna	Akela	17.88	28.78	I-10 – Deming, Las Cruces	I-10 exit 102
Doña Ana		31.430	50.582	I-10 – Deming, Las Cruces	Eastern terminus, I-10 exit 116
1.000 mi = 1.609 km; 1.000 km = 0.621 mi
