= New Mexico State Road 427 =

State highway in New Mexico, United States

State Road 427
- NM 427 highlighted in red

Route information
- Maintained by NMDOT
- Length: 3.980 mi (6.405 km)

Major junctions
- Western end: NM 418 in Deming
- Eastern end: I-10 BL in Deming

Location
- Country: United States
- State: New Mexico
- Counties: Luna

Highway system
- New Mexico State Highway System; Interstate; US; State; Scenic
← NM 426	→ NM 428

State Road 427 (NM 427) is a 3.980-mile-long (6.405 km) state highway in the US state of New Mexico. NM 427's western terminus is at NM 418 in Deming, and the eastern terminus is at Interstate 10 Business (I-10 Bus.) in Deming.

== Major intersections ==
The entire route is in Deming, Luna County.

mi	km	Destinations	Notes
0.000	0.000	NM 418	Western terminus
3.980	6.405	I-10 BL	Eastern terminus
1.000 mi = 1.609 km; 1.000 km = 0.621 mi
