= Florida Mountains =

Mountain range in New Mexico, United States

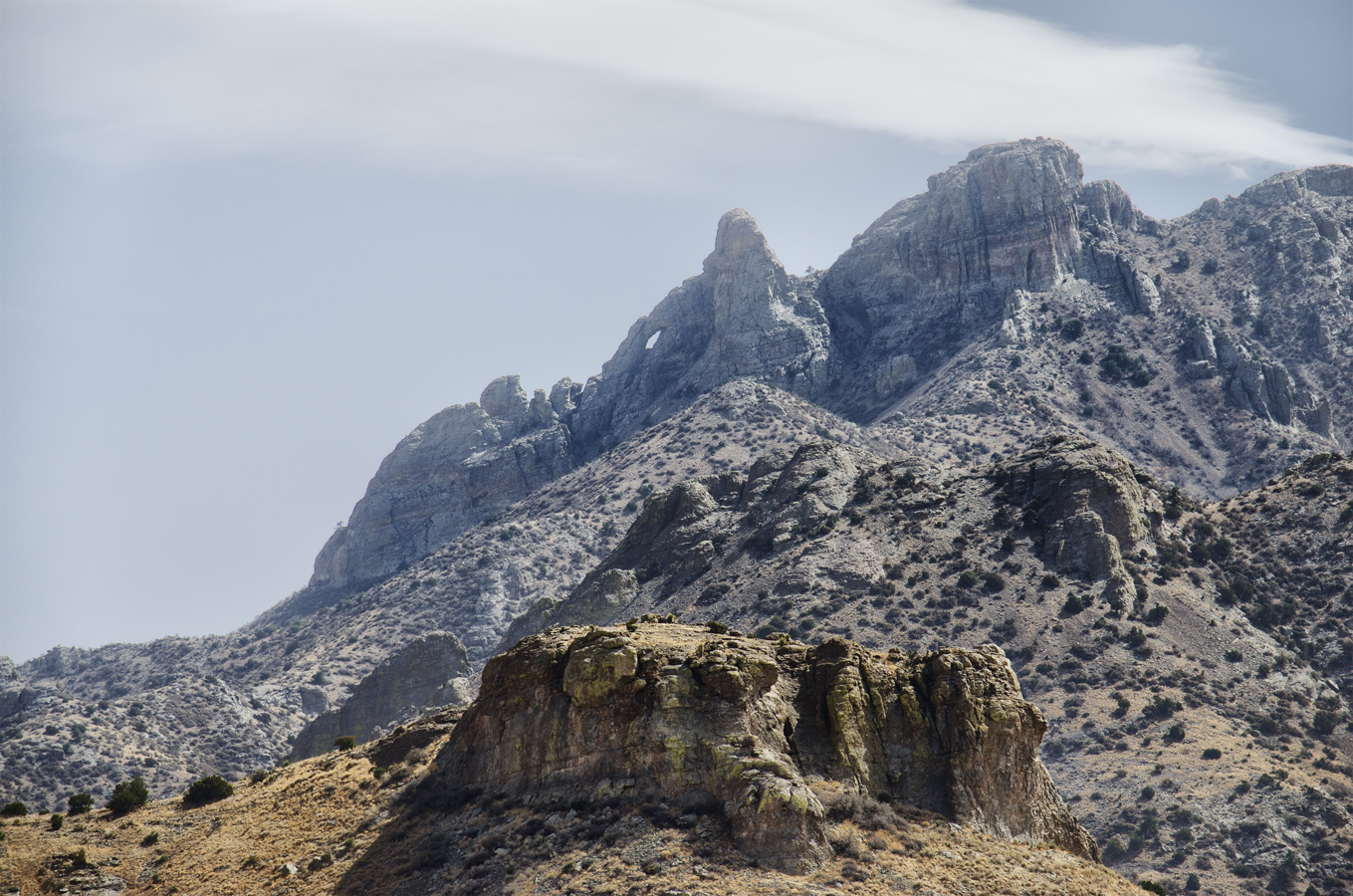
- Needle's Eye, east side of range

Highest point
- Peak: Florida Peak, Florida Mountains-(north)
- Elevation: 7,295 ft (2,224 m)
- Coordinates: 32°07′27″N 107°37′18″W

Dimensions
- Length: 12 mi (19 km) NNW-SSE
- Width: 6 mi (9.7 km)

Geography
- Location within New Mexico
- Country: United States
- State: New Mexico
- Region: (northwest)-Chihuahuan Desert
- County: Luna
- Cities & Towns: Deming, Sunshine, Waterloo, Columbus, Carne and Myndus
- Range coordinates: 32°05′20″N 107°37′26″W
- Borders on: Deming, NM & Cookes Range-N; West Potrillo Mountains-E; Cedar Mountain Range-WSW
- Topo map: USGS Gym Peak

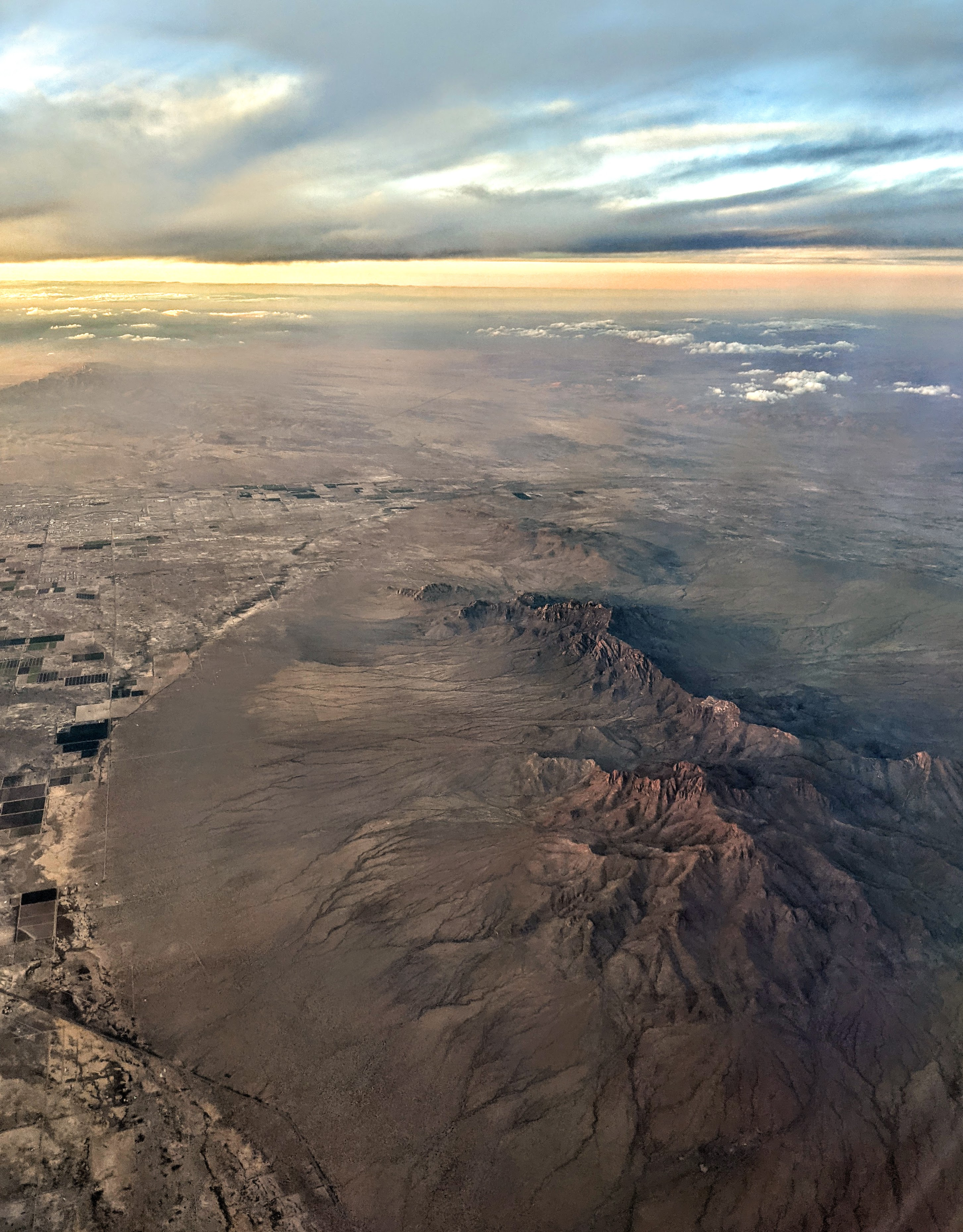
Aerial view of the Florida Mountains and vicinity at sunset

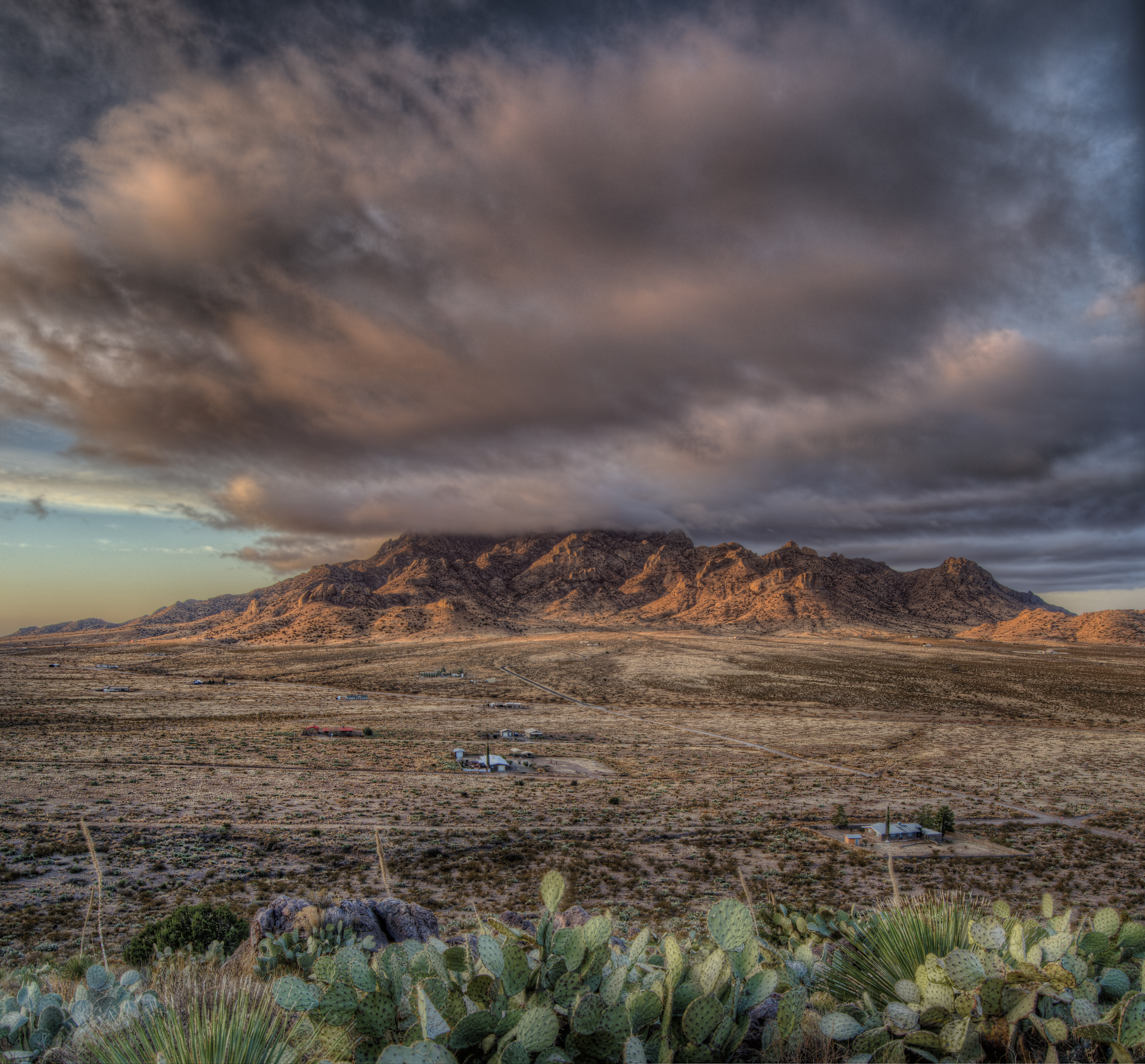
Sunrise on Florida Peak

The Florida Mountains are a small 12-mile (19 km) long, mountain range in New Mexico. The mountains lie in southern Luna County about 15 miles (24 km) southeast of Deming, and 20 miles (32 km) north of the state of Chihuahua, Mexico; the range lies in the north of the Chihuahuan Desert region, and extreme southwestern New Mexico.

The Florida Mountains are east and adjacent to New Mexico State Road 11, the north–south route to Chihuahua; it becomes Highway 23 in Chihuahua and connects to Mexican Federal Highway 2, the major east–west route of the north Chihuahuan Desert adjacent the U.S.-Mexico border.

== Description ==
The Florida Mountains are a small, compact range about 12 miles (19 km) long, with various peaks from 5,000 to 7,000 feet (1,524 to 2,134 m). The range highpoint is Florida Peak, 7,295 feet (2,224 m), which lies near the north. Other high peaks in the center-south, are Gym, Baldy, and South Peak. Four other peaks are in the extreme northwest; besides Florida Peak, the tallest of the other four is Capitol Dome, at 5,962 feet (1,817 m).

Most of the land surrounding the prominent rise of the mountain range are flatlands. Deming, and its suburbs directly south, form the northwest and west border of the range's minor foothills. Populated flatlands are northeast, with open flatlands to the east and southeast.

New Mexico 198 lies at the range's north, the location of Rockhound State Park. The park is nestled between the Florida Mountains, and a 3-mile (5 km) long mountain range called the Little Florida Mountains.

=== Environment and ecology ===
Persian (Bezoar) Ibex (Capra aegagrus aegagrus) have been introduced into the region, and have an established population.

== See also ==
- List of peaks named Baldy
- Battle of the Florida Mountains
