= Sunshine, New Mexico =

- Census-designated place
- Location within New Mexico Location within the United States
- Coordinates: 32°07′48″N 107°47′00″W
- Country: United States
- State: New Mexico
- County: Luna

Area
  - Total: 17.63 sq mi (45.67 km^{2})
  - Land: 17.63 sq mi (45.67 km^{2})
  - Water: 0 sq mi (0.00 km^{2})
- Elevation: 4,265 ft (1,300 m)

Population (2020)
  - Total: 487
  - Density: 27.6/sq mi (10.66/km^{2})
- Time zone: UTC-7 (Mountain (MST))
  - Summer (DST): UTC-6 (MDT)
- Area code: 575
- GNIS feature ID: 2584221

Sunshine is a census-designated place in Luna County, New Mexico, United States. As of the 2020 census, Sunshine had a population of 487. New Mexico State Road 11 passes through the community.

== Geography ==
According to the U.S. Census Bureau, the community has an area of 17.635 square miles (45.67 km^{2}), all land.

== Demographics ==
Historical population
Census	Pop.	Note	%±
2020	487		—
U.S. Decennial Census

== Education ==
Like other areas in Luna County, the community is in the Deming Public Schools school district.
