= Mountain View, Luna County, New Mexico =

Mountain View, New Mexico
- Census-designated place
- Location within New Mexico Location within the United States
- Coordinates: 32°13′44″N 107°44′55″W
- Country: United States
- State: New Mexico
- County: Luna

Area
  - Total: 0.305 sq mi (0.79 km^{2})
  - Land: 0.305 sq mi (0.79 km^{2})
  - Water: 0 sq mi (0 km^{2})
- Elevation: 4,301 ft (1,311 m)

Population (2010)
  - Total: 122
  - Density: 400/sq mi (154/km^{2})
- Time zone: UTC-7 (Mountain (MST))
  - Summer (DST): UTC-6 (MDT)
- Area code: 575
- GNIS feature ID: 2584158

Mountain View is a census-designated place in Luna County, New Mexico, United States. Its population was 122 as of the 2010 census. Mountain View had a post office from 1911 to 1914.

Like other areas in Luna County, the community is in the Deming Public Schools school district.
