= Mountain View Farm =

Mountain View Farm may refer to:

- Mountain View Farm (Plainview, Arkansas), listed on the National Register of Historic Places (NRHP) in Arkansas
- Mountain View Farm (Dublin, New Hampshire), listed on the NRHP in Cheshire County, New Hampshire
- Mountain View Stock Farm, Benson, Vermont, listed on the National Register of Historic Places in Rutland County, Vermont
- Mountain View Farm (Clifford, Virginia), listed on the NRHP in Amherst County, Virginia
- Mountain View Farm (Lexington, Virginia), listed on the NRHP in Rockbridge County, Virginia
