= Mountain View Hotel (Centennial, Wyoming) =

- U.S. National Register of Historic Places
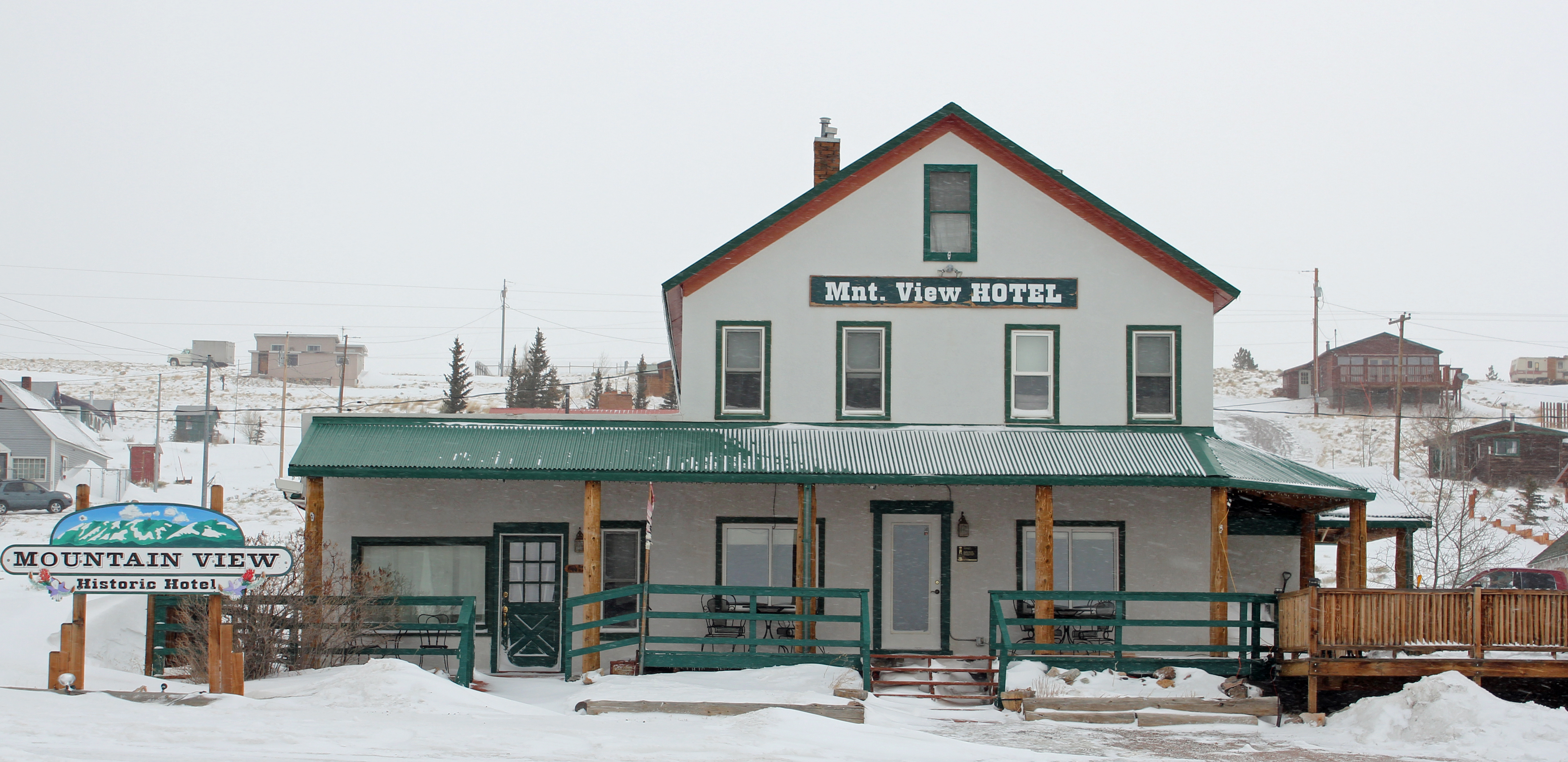
- Mountain View Hotel in 2014

- Location within Wyoming
- Location: 2747 WY 130, Centennial, Wyoming
- Coordinates: 41°17′52″N 106°8′24″W
- Area: less than one acre
- Built: 1907
- Architectural style: Folk Victorian
- NRHP reference No.: 07000541
- Added to NRHP: June 7, 2007

The Mountain View Hotel is a historic hotel near Centennial, Wyoming. It was built in 1907 as the railroad arrived in Centennial in the declining years of a gold mining boom. The hotel was part of a community development plan to develop businesses that did not depend on mining. featured 20 rooms and three baths, but the bathrooms were originally located in a separate stable building. The hotel was bought by Gustav and Anna Sundby in 1914, who operated the hotel into the 1940s. In the 1950s the hotel became an apartment house.

The hotel was restored in the 2000s and is once more a hotel. It was placed on the National Register of Historic Places on June 7, 2007.
