= Mountain View Farm (Dublin, New Hampshire) =

Historic house in New Hampshire, United States

- U.S. National Register of Historic Places
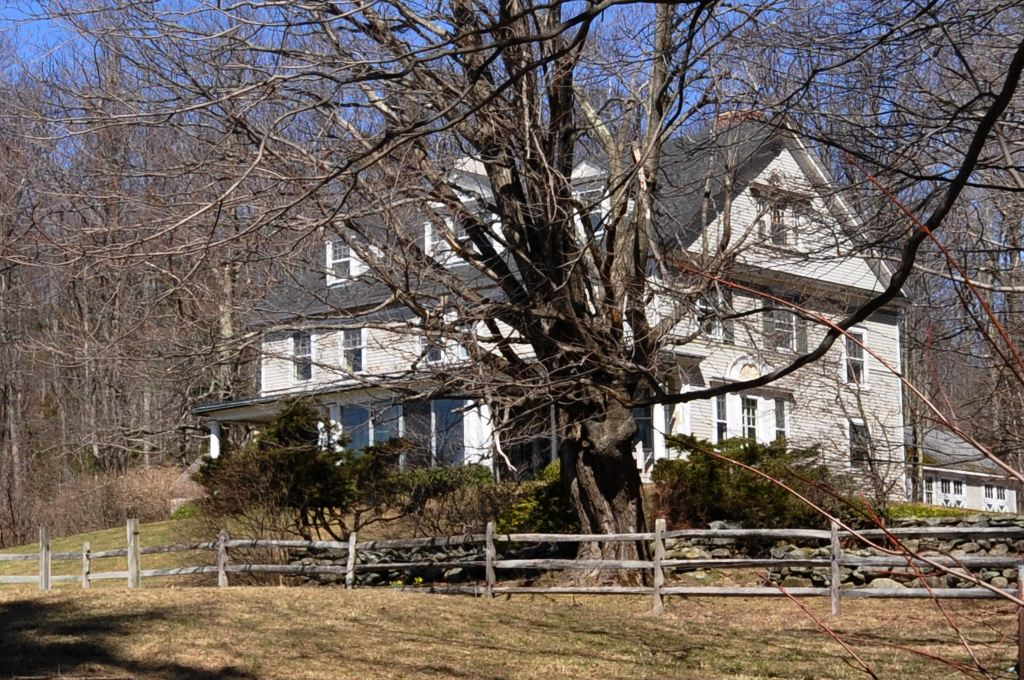

- Location within New Hampshire Location within the United States
- Location: Upper Jaffrey Rd., Dublin, New Hampshire
- Coordinates: 42°53′20″N 72°4′3″W
- Area: 2.6 acres (1.1 ha)
- Built: 1780
- Built by: Nathan Bixby (original house)
- Architect: John Lawrence Mauran (1903 addition)
- Architectural style: Colonial Revival, Georgian
- MPS: Dublin MRA
- NRHP reference No.: 83004057
- Added to NRHP: December 18, 1983

Mountain View Farm is a historic farmhouse on Close Road, off Upper Jaffrey Road in Dublin, New Hampshire. Built about 1780 and enlarged in 1903, it encapsulates both Dublin's early residential history, and its early 20th-century period as a summer retreat area. The house was listed on the National Register of Historic Places in 1983.

== Description and history ==
Mountain View Farm stands in an isolated rural setting south of Dublin village, on the eastern slope of Mount Monadnock. It is at the end of Close Road, its access drive from Upper Jaffrey Road. The house consists of two parts. The main portion is a two-story wood-frame structure, with a gabled roof and clapboarded exterior. It has a nearly symmetrical six-bay facade, with a hip-roofed single-story porch extending across its width, and three gabled dormers projecting from the roof. Attached is an older 1 1/2-story ell, whose exterior has been altered to match that of the main block, but whose interior retains many original 18th-century features.

The ell was built about 1780 by Nathan Bixby, a major landowner, Revolutionary War veteran, and prominent citizen of the town. In the late 19th century the house was acquired by George and Alice Upton, who in 1903 commissioned John Lawrence Mauran, a prominent Chicago architect, to design a Georgian Revival summer house, to which the older house was attached as a wing. The best-known occupant of the house was Mark Twain, who rented it for his second visit to Dublin in 1906.

== See also ==
- National Register of Historic Places listings in Cheshire County, New Hampshire
