= Mountain View (Morganton, North Carolina) =

Historic house in North Carolina, United States

- U.S. National Register of Historic Places
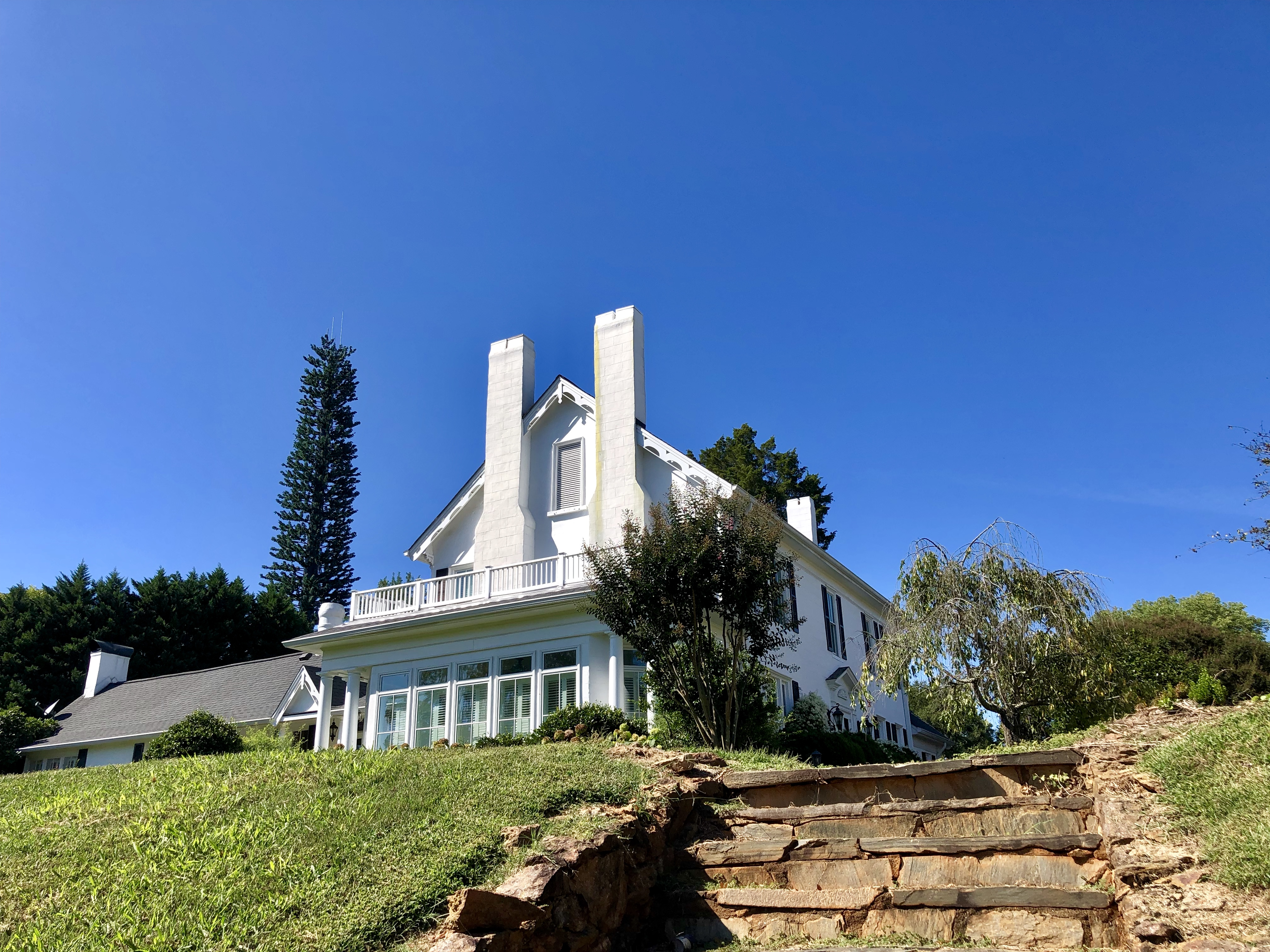
- Mountain View, August 2019

- Location within North Carolina Location within the United States
- Location: 604 W. Union St., Morganton, North Carolina
- Coordinates: 35°44′23″N 81°41′50″W
- Area: 1.6 acres (0.65 ha)
- Built: c. 1815
- Architectural style: Federal
- NRHP reference No.: 84000076
- Added to NRHP: October 11, 1984

Mountain View is a historic plantation house at Morganton, Burke County, North Carolina. It was built about 1815, and is a 2 1/2-story, five-bay, Federal-style brick house. It was remodeled in the 1870s in the Gothic Revival style. It features a two-story gabled porch with decorative bargeboards. Later remodelings added Victorian- and Colonial Revival-style decorative elements.

It was listed on the National Register of Historic Places in 1984.
