= Luna County, New Mexico =

County in New Mexico, United States

- County
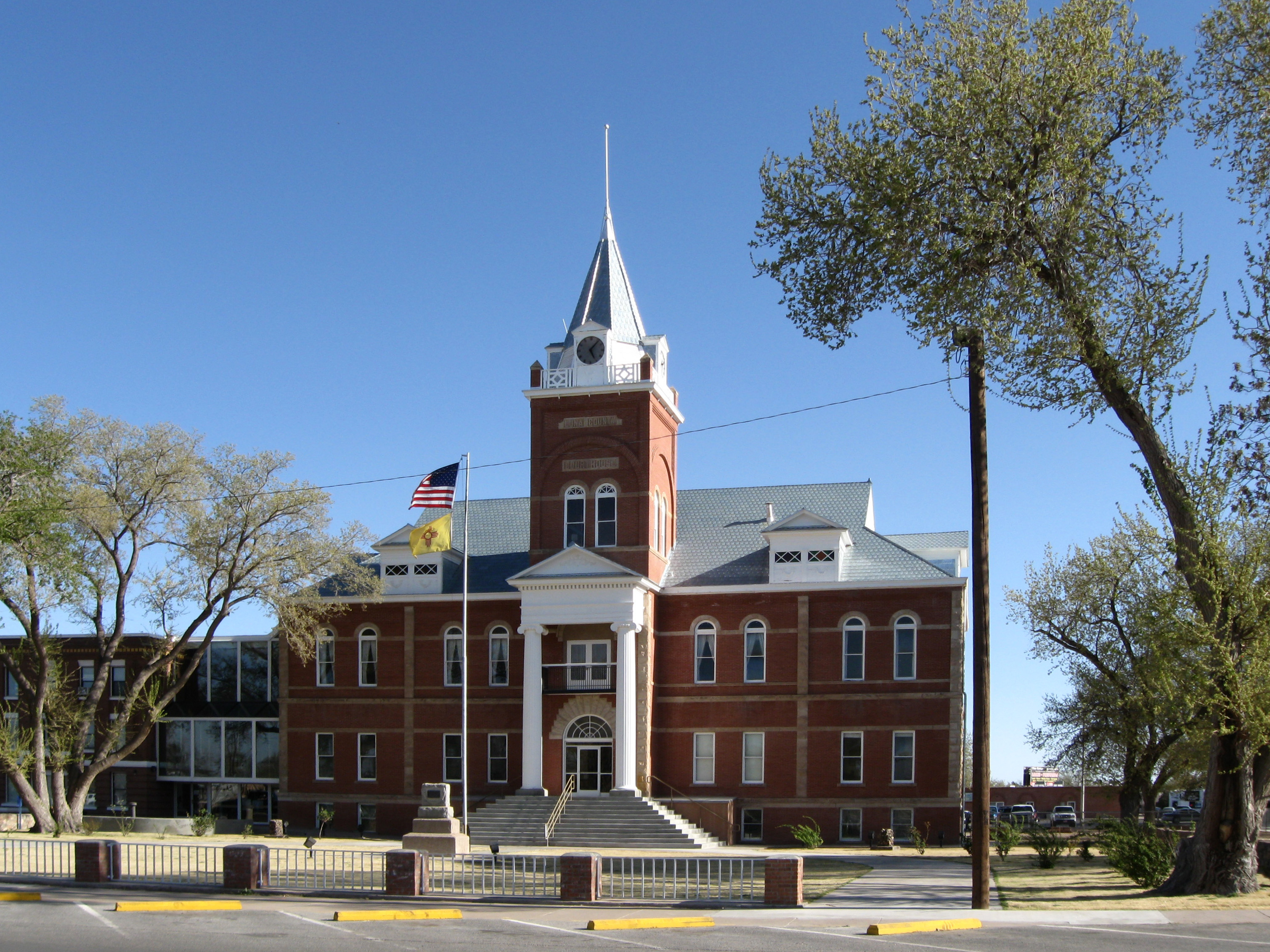
- Luna County Courthouse in Deming

- Location within the U.S. state of New Mexico
- Coordinates: 32°11′N 107°45′W
- Country: United States
- State: New Mexico
- Founded: March 16, 1901
- Named for: Solomon Luna
- Seat: Deming
- Largest city: Deming

Area
  - Total: 2,965 sq mi (7,680 km^{2})
  - Land: 2,965 sq mi (7,680 km^{2})
  - Water: 0.2 sq mi (0.52 km^{2}) 0.0%

Population (2020)
  - Total: 25,427
  - Estimate (2025): 25,407 ▼
  - Density: 8.576/sq mi (3.311/km^{2})
- Time zone: UTC−7 (Mountain)
  - Summer (DST): UTC−6 (MDT)
- Congressional district: 2nd
- Website: www.lunacounty.gov

Luna County (Spanish: Condado de Luna) is a county located in the U.S. state of New Mexico. As of the 2020 census, the population was 25,427. Its county seat is Deming. This county abuts the Mexican border. Luna County comprises the Deming, NM Micropolitan Statistical Area.

== History ==
Luna County was formed from parts of Grant County and Doña Ana County by the New Mexico Legislature on March 16, 1901. It was named for Solomon Luna, a politician who advocated for independence of the county, following a strong rivalry between the cities of Deming and Silver City, both of which were at the time in Grant County.

Before dawn on March 16, 1916, Mexican revolutionary Pancho Villa led several hundred of his rebel soldiers across the Mexican border into the village of Columbus in the southern part of the county. The invaders raided and burned much of the town, causing many residents to flee to the desert. Although the raid took the town by surprise, it also awakened 350 United States Army soldiers stationed at Camp Furlong at the edge of town. These soldiers defended Columbus with two machine guns. The fighting continued until dawn, when Villa fled back across the Mexican border, five hours after the initial invasion and approximately ninety minutes after attacking the town. Despite the U.S. Army's subsequent "Mexican Expedition" into Mexico, Villa was never captured. The United States' involvement in World War I soon diverted attention away from the pursuit of Villa. He was assassinated seven years later. The raid resulted in the deaths of eighteen Columbus residents and U.S. soldiers, while approximately seventy-five of Villa's soldiers were killed.

In 1917, striking copper miners from Bisbee, Arizona were forcibly deported to this county.

Construction of an improved barrier on the border with Mexico was expedited in 2019 with waivers of environmental and other laws. The waivers are for 27 laws, including protection of endangered species, archaeological sites, and historic places.

Today, Pancho Villa State Park is located in the village of Columbus. It features cacti and the ruins of "the U.S. Army's first greaserack".

== Geography ==
According to the U.S. Census Bureau, the county has a total area of 2,965 square miles (7,680 km^{2}), virtually all of which is land. The bulk of the county is flat lowland, either grassland or desert scrub, but it also contains three mountain ranges: Cooke's Range in the north, the Florida Mountains on the southeastern side of Deming near the center of the county, and the Tres Hermanas Mountains in the southern part of the county near Columbus.

=== Adjacent counties and municipality ===
- Sierra County – northeast
- Doña Ana County – east
- Grant County – west
- Hidalgo County – west
- Ascensión, Chihuahua, Mexico – south

=== Major highways ===
- I-10 / US 70
  - I-10 BL (Deming)
- US 180
- NM 9
- NM 11
- NM 26
- NM 27
- NM 61
- NM 143
- NM 198
- NM 377
- NM 418
- NM 427
- NM 549

== Demographics ==
Historical population
Census	Pop.	Note	%±
1910	3,913		—
1920	12,270		213.6%
1930	6,247		−49.1%
1940	6,457		3.4%
1950	8,753		35.6%
1960	9,839		12.4%
1970	11,706		19.0%
1980	15,585		33.1%
1990	18,110		16.2%
2000	25,016		38.1%
2010	25,095		0.3%
2020	25,427		1.3%
2025 (est.)	25,407	▼	−0.1%
U.S. Decennial Census; 1790-1960 1900-1990; 1990-2000 2010

=== 2020 census ===
As of the 2020 census, the county had a population of 25,427. The median age was 39.8 years. 24.8% of residents were under the age of 18 and 21.7% of residents were 65 years of age or older. For every 100 females there were 99.1 males, and for every 100 females age 18 and over there were 97.5 males age 18 and over.

Luna County, New Mexico – Racial and ethnic composition Note: the US Census treats Hispanic/Latino as an ethnic category. This table excludes Latinos from the racial categories and assigns them to a separate category. Hispanics/Latinos may be of any race.
Race / Ethnicity (NH = Non-Hispanic)	Pop 2000	Pop 2010	Pop 2020	% 2000	% 2010	% 2020
White alone (NH)	9,921	8,997	7,671	39.66%	35.85%	30.17%
Black or African American alone (NH)	183	189	228	0.73%	0.75%	0.90%
Native American or Alaska Native alone (NH)	156	144	143	0.62%	0.57%	0.56%
Asian alone (NH)	78	112	160	0.31%	0.45%	0.63%
Pacific Islander alone (NH)	1	2	12	0.00%	0.01%	0.05%
Other race alone (NH)	29	33	50	0.12%	0.13%	0.20%
Mixed race or Multiracial (NH)	213	195	493	0.85%	0.78%	1.94%
Hispanic or Latino (any race)	14,435	15,423	16,670	57.70%	61.46%	65.56%
Total	25,016	25,095	25,427	100.00%	100.00%	100.00%

The racial makeup of the county was 50.3% White, 1.2% Black or African American, 1.4% American Indian and Alaska Native, 0.7% Asian, 0.1% Native Hawaiian and Pacific Islander, 21.5% from some other race, and 24.9% from two or more races. Hispanic or Latino residents of any race comprised 65.6% of the population.

58.7% of residents lived in urban areas, while 41.3% lived in rural areas.

There were 9,822 households in the county, of which 31.2% had children under the age of 18 living with them and 29.9% had a female householder with no spouse or partner present. About 30.9% of all households were made up of individuals and 16.7% had someone living alone who was 65 years of age or older.

There were 11,508 housing units, of which 14.7% were vacant. Among occupied housing units, 67.5% were owner-occupied and 32.5% were renter-occupied. The homeowner vacancy rate was 2.9% and the rental vacancy rate was 10.0%.

=== 2010 census ===
As of the 2010 census, there were 25,095 people, 9,593 households, and 6,484 families living in the county. The population density was 8.5 inhabitants per square mile (3.3/km^{2}). There were 10,999 housing units at an average density of 3.7 units per square mile (1.4 units/km^{2}). The racial makeup of the county was 77.7% white, 1.3% American Indian, 1.1% black or African American, 0.5% Asian, 0.1% Pacific islander, 16.6% from other races, and 2.6% from two or more races. Those of Hispanic or Latino origin made up 61.5% of the population. In terms of ancestry, 9.7% were German, 7.4% were English, 7.3% were Irish, and 2.4% were American.

Of the 9,593 households, 34.0% had children under the age of 18 living with them, 47.6% were married couples living together, 14.5% had a female householder with no husband present, 32.4% were non-families, and 27.8% of all households were made up of individuals. The average household size was 2.56 and the average family size was 3.13. The median age was 39.5 years.

The median income for a household in the county was $27,997 and the median income for a family was $33,312. Males had a median income of $31,905 versus $19,865 for females. The per capita income for the county was $15,687. About 26.2% of families and 32.8% of the population were below the poverty line, including 50.2% of those under age 18 and 20.3% of those age 65 or over.

=== 2000 census ===
As of the 2000 census, there were 25,016 people, 9,397 households, and 6,596 families living in the county. The population density was 8 people per square mile (3.1 people/km^{2}). There were 11,291 housing units at an average density of 4 units per square mile (1.5/km^{2}). The racial makeup of the county was 74.30% White, 0.94% Black or African American, 1.11% Native American, 0.34% Asian, 20.23% from other races, and 3.08% from two or more races. 57.70% of the population were Hispanic or Latino of any race.

There were 9,397 households, out of which 33.90% had children under the age of 18 living with them, 53.60% were married couples living together, 12.40% had a female householder with no husband present, and 29.80% were non-families. 26.40% of all households were made up of individuals, and 14.00% had someone living alone who was 65 years of age or older. The average household size was 2.64 and the average family size was 3.20.

In the county, the population was spread out, with 30.00% under the age of 18, 7.60% from 18 to 24, 22.70% from 25 to 44, 21.50% from 45 to 64, and 18.20% who were 65 years of age or older. The median age was 37 years. For every 100 females there were 95.20 males. For every 100 females age 18 and over, there were 93.20 males.

The median income for a household in the county was $20,784, and the median income for a family was $24,252. Males had a median income of $25,008 versus $16,883 for females. The per capita income for the county was $11,218. About 27.20% of families and 32.90% of the population were below the poverty line, including 46.80% of those under age 18 and 15.80% of those age 65 or over.

== Education ==
Residents in all parts of the county are zoned to Deming Public Schools.

== Communities ==
=== City ===
- Deming (county seat)

=== Village ===
- Columbus

=== Census-designated places ===
- City of the Sun
- Keeler Farm
- La Hacienda
- Mountain View
- Old Town
- Pecan Park
- Pulpotio Bareas
- Sunshine
- Ventura

=== Ghost towns ===
- Gage
- Mimbres
- Mowry City
- Myndus
- Nutt
- Ojo de Vaca Station

== Politics ==
Luna County is a Republican-leaning county in presidential elections. However, it has voted for Democrats 3 times since 1964.

United States presidential election results for Luna County, New Mexico
Year	Republican		Democratic		Third party(ies)	
Year	No.	%	No.	%	No.	%
1912	81	9.89%	461	56.29%	277	33.82%
1916	418	33.10%	796	63.02%	49	3.88%
1920	834	44.65%	1,000	53.53%	34	1.82%
1924	709	43.28%	596	36.39%	333	20.33%
1928	860	56.80%	647	42.73%	7	0.46%
1932	641	28.04%	1,605	70.21%	40	1.75%
1936	806	34.05%	1,500	63.37%	61	2.58%
1940	1,066	43.33%	1,388	56.42%	6	0.24%
1944	1,074	43.68%	1,383	56.24%	2	0.08%
1948	941	36.42%	1,629	63.04%	14	0.54%
1952	1,729	55.86%	1,332	43.04%	34	1.10%
1956	1,526	49.76%	1,506	49.10%	35	1.14%
1960	1,583	47.88%	1,708	51.66%	15	0.45%
1964	1,665	41.95%	2,286	57.60%	18	0.45%
1968	1,952	50.10%	1,438	36.91%	506	12.99%
1972	2,958	63.25%	1,560	33.35%	159	3.40%
1976	2,966	50.25%	2,872	48.65%	65	1.10%
1980	3,636	57.30%	2,443	38.50%	267	4.21%
1984	4,145	61.17%	2,557	37.74%	74	1.09%
1988	3,415	51.46%	3,066	46.20%	155	2.34%
1992	2,166	34.53%	2,637	42.04%	1,469	23.42%
1996	2,616	41.35%	3,001	47.44%	709	11.21%
2000	3,395	51.35%	2,975	44.99%	242	3.66%
2004	4,164	54.84%	3,340	43.99%	89	1.17%
2008	3,870	46.40%	4,311	51.69%	159	1.91%
2012	3,670	48.93%	3,583	47.77%	247	3.29%
2016	3,478	47.68%	3,195	43.80%	622	8.53%
2020	4,408	54.40%	3,563	43.97%	132	1.63%
2024	4,698	58.32%	3,176	39.42%	182	2.26%

== See also ==
- Luna, New Mexico, a community in Catron County
- National Register of Historic Places listings in Luna County, New Mexico
