= Monument Valley High School =

Monument Valley High School may refer to:

- Monument Valley High School (Arizona)
- Monument Valley High School (Utah)
