= Mountain View Homestead and General Store =

Mountain View Homestead
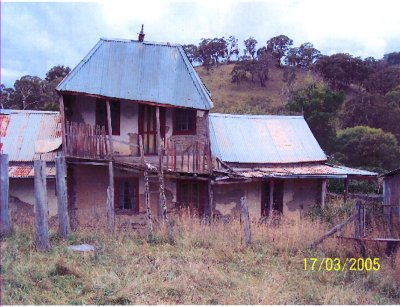
- Mountain View Homestead and General Store, 2005

- Location within New South Wales Location within Australia
- 33.6557036°S 149.6979321°E
- Location: Wisemans Creek, Oberon Shire, New South Wales, Australia

History
- Built: 1880–1894

Site notes
- Architect: David Smith Todd

New South Wales Heritage Register
- Official name: Mountain View Homestead and General Store
- Type: state heritage (built)
- Designated: 10 March 2006
- Reference no.: 1743
- Type: House
- Category: Residential buildings (private)
- Builders: David Smith Todd

Mountain View Homestead and General Store is a heritage-listed homestead and general store at Wisemans Creek, Oberon Shire, New South Wales, Australia. It was designed by David Smith Todd, who built the homestead from 1880 to 1894. It was added to the New South Wales State Heritage Register on 10 March 2006.

== History ==
=== Aboriginal people and colonisation ===
Aboriginal occupation of the Blue Mountains area dates back at least 12,000 years and appears to have intensified some 3000–4000 years ago. In pre-colonial times the area now known as Bathurst was inhabited by Aboriginal people of the Wiradjuri linguistic group. The clan associated with Bathurst occupied on a seasonal basis most of the Macquarie River area. They moved regularly in small groups but preferred the open land and used the waterways for a variety of food. There are numerous river flats where debris from recurrent camps accumulated over a long period. European settlement in this region after the first documented white expedition west of the Blue Mountains in 1813 was tentative because of apprehensions about resistance from Aboriginal people. There was some contact, witnessed by sporadic hostility and by the quantity of surviving artefacts manufactured by the Aborigines from European glass. By 1840 there was widespread dislocation of Aboriginal culture, aggravated after 1850 by the goldrush to the region.

Prior to European settlement in Australia, the Wiradjuri Aboriginal group lived in the upper Macquarie Valley. Bathurst was proclaimed a town by Lachlan Macquarie on 7 May 1815, named after Lord Bathurst, Principal Secretary of State for the Colonies. Bathurst is Australia's oldest inland township.

=== Bathurst ===
Governor Macquarie chose the site of the future town of Bathurst on 7 May 1815 during his tour over the Blue Mountains, on the road already completed by convict labour supervised by William Cox. Macquarie marked out the boundaries near the depot established by surveyor George Evans and reserved a site for a government house and domain. Reluctant to open the rich Bathurst Plains to a large settlement, Macquarie authorised few grants there initially, one of the first being 1000 acres to William Lawson, one of the three European explorers who crossed the mountains in 1813. The road-maker William Cox was another early grantee but later had to move his establishment to Kelso on the non-government side of the Macquarie River.

A modest release of land in February 1818 occurred when ten men were chosen to take up 50 acre farms and 2 acre town allotments across the river from the government buildings. When corruption by government supervisor Richard Lewis and acting Commandant William Cox caused their dismissal, they were replaced by Lieutenant William Lawson who became Commandant of the settlement in 1818.

Macquarie continued to restrict Bathurst settlement and reserved all land on the south side of the Macquarie River for government buildings and stock, a situation that prevailed until 1826. In December 1819 Bathurst had a population of only 120 people in 30 houses, two thirds being in the township of Kelso on the eastern side of the river and the remainder scattered on rural landholdings nearby. The official report in 1820 numbered Bathurst settlers at 114, including only 14 women and 15 children. The government buildings comprised a brick house for the commandant, brick barracks for the military detachment and houses for the stock keeper, and log houses for the 50 convicts who worked the government farm. Never successful, the government farm was closed by Governor Darling in 1828.

Governor Darling, arriving in Sydney in 1825, promptly commenced a review of colonial administration and subsequently introduced vigorous reforms. On advice from Viscount Goderich, Darling divided colonial expenditure into two parts: one to cover civil administration, funded by New South Wales; the other for the convict system, funded by Britain.

By this time, J McBrien and Robert Hoddle had surveyed the existing grants in the vicinity. Surveyor James Bym Richards began work on the south side of the river in 1826. But the town was apparently designed by Thomas Mitchell in 1830 and did not open until late 1833 after Richards had completed the layout of the streets with their two-road allotments. The first sales were held in 1831 before the survey was complete.

In 1832 the new Governor, Major General Sir Richard Bourke, visited Bathurst in October. He instructed the Surveyor General Major Thomas L. Mitchell to make arrangements for "opening the town of Bathurst without delay" and he in turn instructed the Assistant Surveyor at Bathurst J. B. Richards to lay out the blocks and streets. This was done in September 1833. It is believed that Major Mitchell named the streets, with George Street being named after King George III.

=== Mountain View ===
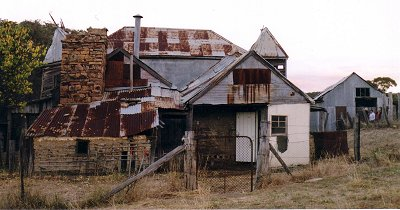
View from another side

David Smith Todd's family settled at Wiseman's Creek in 1854 after arriving in Australia from England several years earlier. William Todd farmed and ran a General Store. When David turned 21 years old he took up land a further 2 miles upstream from his father's farm and store, on Stoney Creek. David married Letitia Connelly in 1865 and the couple built their first home of timber slab construction next to their General Store. The original home was demolished in 1907. During the years of the gold rush and mining activity in the area (c. 1873 - late 1880s) the subdivision lots of portion 43 DP757039 were leased out to Chinese and some European miners and prospectors by David Todd. Later owner Betty Somerville stated "It was said that 400 people lived between the house and the junction of Sewells and Brisbane Creeks in those days."

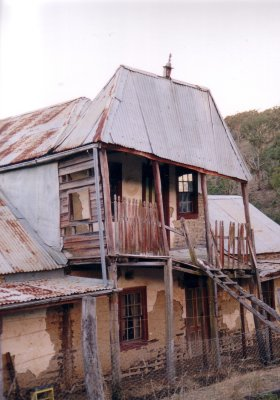
Two storey structure with stairs

In the 1880s David began construction of Mountain View homestead on Lot 51. The two-storey wattle and daub building constructed using materials from the property was finished in 1894 as evidenced in the date printed over the front door. Its highly decorative features, and the grand scale of its rooms and levels indicate the status and character of David Todd who, as well as running the General Store and farming his land, was apparently a romantic and artistic man and active local citizen. Todd wrote poetry, painted, regularly delivered public lectures on various topics and ran in the Macquarie seat elections in 1889.

The General Store operated as early as 1868 when the local school teacher boarded in a room at the rear of the store and held classes at Mountain View. The General store clientele included local farmers as well as gold prospectors, miners and Chinese who arrived in the Wiseman's Creek area from 1873. The 1880s saw the most active and prosperous fossicking and silver, gold and copper mining activity in the area with such activity dwindling away during the 1890s. The General Store was later converted to a shearing shed.

The Mountain View property was large and included acreage on the western and eastern sides of Stoney Creek. He grazed sheep on the hills and had quite extensive orchards, located in Lots 45, 46, 47, 48, 49, 50 and wheat fields, located on Lots 58–61. The house block, Lots 51 and 52, contained a vegetable garden "in the S bend of the creek", according to notes on history compiled by Betty Somerville (née McKinney). Betty's efforts to maintain this vegetable garden enabled David, Letitia and their seven children to be relatively self-sufficient.

David Todd died in 1929 and the majority of the property passed to his daughter Alice Davina Gunning (née Todd). Alice's son Cecil Gunning inherited Mountain View from his mother and sold it to the McKinneys in 1973. From 1974 Ross and Betty McKinney (now Betty Somerville) lived in the house with their two children, Heather and Barrie. Following the untimely death of Ross McKinney, Betty remarried and in 1983 the Somervilles bought more of the original Mountain View property which had a more modern dwelling. Betty recalls that it was "terrific" living in the Mountain View homestead - a vast change from her previous life in the city. The house did not have electricity and she used the old cast iron stove for cooking, until her father in law gave Ross and Betty a generator. Betty used the old mangle to wash clothes and battled the dust with a broom in the absence of a vacuum cleaner.

In c. 1974 the wall paper in the downstairs of the house was replaced.

As well as trying to make a living from farming in difficult times, Betty organised for the Anglican Church to set up the Camp Howard Country camps on the property. The organisation built a camp hall on Lot 44. In 1989 the wool industry went into decline and Betty decided to put more energy into developing the tourism values of the property. She organised many activities including horse riding and in 1991 was an early participant in the Japanese Farm Stay Scheme.

In 2003 the Mountain View property was put up for sale and half the property, Portions 201, 264, and 84, was sold to Morris Lyda and his wife who lived in Sydney. The other half of the property, Portions 85, 44, and 43, including the Mountain View homestead, is still owned by Mrs Betty Sommerville but leased under contract of sale to Morris Lyda and his wife.

== Description ==
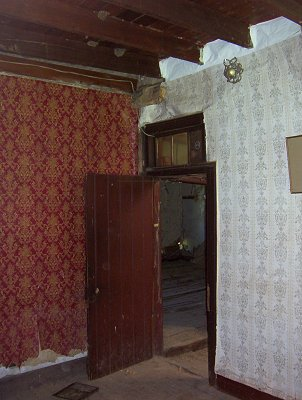
Homestead interior

Mountain View is a two-storey wattle and daub dwelling comprising 6 ground floor rooms - 4 bedrooms, a lounge room, a kitchen and adjacent bakehouse. The kitchen contains a large open fireplace and stone chimney. There are two decorative fireplaces and associated stone chimneys. One of these is in the lounge room and the other in one of the downstairs bedrooms.

The upstairs level comprises two large rooms; a bedroom and a rumpus room. The construction of the dwelling uses the half log technique where vertical poles were placed at about 400–600 mm apart with lath nailed crosswise to these and completed with mud and stone infill. The timber was harvested from the property and each pole was roughly axed flat. The mud was dug from nearby Levy's gully. Bullocks were driven around a revolving pole to mix the mud to the correct consistency.

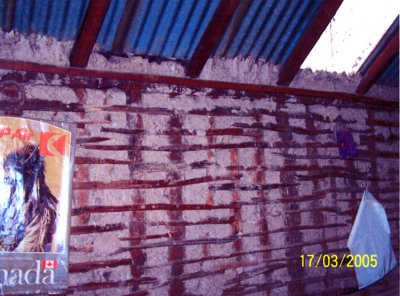
Wattle and daub construction

The external walls were rendered with lime plaster, concealing the framework and mud infill and giving the dwelling a less primitive appearance than many homes constructed using similar techniques and materials. The downstairs internal walls were wall papered. The upstairs internal walls were timber lined and painted with some sections having been replaced with fibro cladding. Some ceilings are lined with fibro and others with calico. A timber ladder provides access between ground and first floors.

On the north west and south east of the upstairs there are covered timber balconies featuring unusual French influenced hipped roofs with handmade decorative finials, timber balustrades and other highly artistic and decorative features. The French influence in the design was suggested by the late Professor Max Freeland who cited the gables and also the colours used in the four panelled doors featured through the house as specifically influenced by the French Renaissance style of architecture. In his opinion Mountain View was probably the only two storey wattle and daub building in Australia.

The ground storey of the house is encircled on 3 sides by a generous veranda with decorative timber posts and a carved timber valance. The windows at the front of the house are large timber framed sash windows with unusual decorative features in the architrave and sill board. Internal and external doors feature fanlights

Some of the floors have been replaced, and fibro cladding has been added as has an extra bathroom with gas heater.

Alongside the dwelling to the north west lies the General Store, a timber framed corrugated iron clad building which David Todd operated as a General Store from the 1860s until some time after the late 1880s when the local gold and silver rush diminished. Parts of the signage for the store are still visible. It was later used as a shearing shed and remnants of shearing equipment are still in situ.

The building was reported to be in need of stabilisation and conservation as at 28 April 2005. Much of the protective render had fallen away from the walls, the upstairs balcony floors and associated roof of the lower verandas were subsiding although recent work had been done to prop them while awaiting extensive remediation. Some internal walls needed repair as did the roof and some of the timbers in the house were threatened by termite damage. An enthusiastic group of local heritage volunteers and others interested in conservation and earthen dwellings had started the job of stabilising the dwelling and are investigating funding sources to assist in this.

== Heritage listing ==
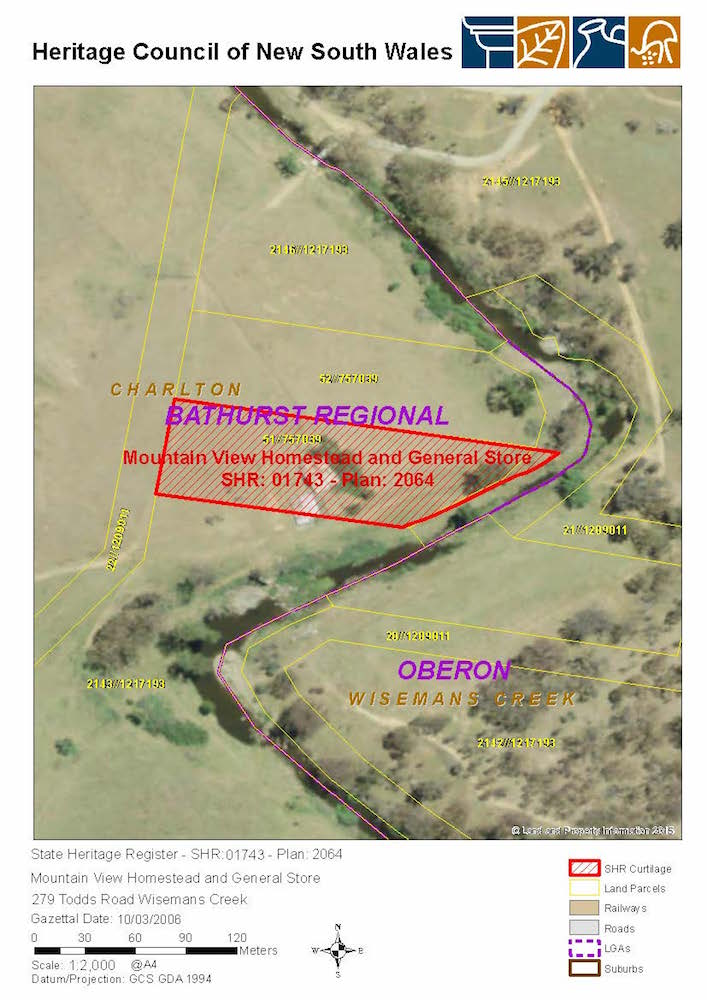
Heritage boundaries

Mountain View Homestead and General Store is of State significance for its historic and aesthetic and technical merits.

The Homestead is a rare and unusual example of a two-storey wattle and daub dwelling still in its original context including the adjacent timber slab General Store which was run by the original owner, David Todd. It is of State significance for the rarity and uniqueness of the homestead building which lies in the marriage of relatively primitive construction methods and materials and its numerous highly decorative features and finishes in the French Renaissance style. It contains decorative balconies, and veranda valences as well as an unusually roof complete with hand made finials. Mountain View Homestead is probably the only two storey wattle and daub building in Australia.

The Mountain View Homestead and General Store is likely to be of State significance as it demonstrates the historic lifestyle of a rural settler in the Victorian era when rural life was still a matter of isolation and resourcefulness. This aspect is reflected in the construction techniques and materials used. At the same time the large size of the wattle and daub dwelling and the "artistic" architectural features of the building utilising French Renaissance style influences in its design and finishes indicate the development off a more secure and comfortable rural life for settlers at the end of the nineteenth century than that of earlier pioneering settlers . This lifestyle change was made possible as the rural economy developed through agriculture and the development of other industries (mining and prospecting in this area). The General Store associated with the Homestead demonstrates the way in which entrepreneurial settlers of the Victorian era in rural NSW developed the economic opportunities that arose during gold/silver rush era in NSW.

In addition Mountain View Homestead and General Store provides an important insight into the early construction techniques and is a fine example of a dwelling built using the half log construction techniques of the time. This adds to the State heritage significance of this item.

Mountain View Homestead was listed on the New South Wales State Heritage Register on 10 March 2006 having satisfied the following criteria.

The place is important in demonstrating the course, or pattern, of cultural or natural history in New South Wales.

Mountain View homestead and General Store is likely to be historically significant as it demonstrates the pattern of settlement and development in rural NSW in the late 1800s. The land on which the homestead and store are located are part of the original subdivision of Crown land in the area. The development of the store and the unusually elaborate homestead on Lot 51 portion 43 DP 757039 was facilitated by the local gold rush and development of mining in the area.

The combination of primitive constructions and techniques with the grand proportions of the dwelling, its architectural features including external rendering made this dwelling more than a simple shelter . The house is/was also a marker of the family's status and life situation. As such the homestead and General Store demonstrates the development of a rural lifestyle that was not preoccupied with pioneering survival but the establishment of a more comfortable and sophisticated pastoral and rural community lifestyle. The buildings tell the story of a significant phase in the development of rural NSW.

The place has a strong or special association with a person, or group of persons, of importance of cultural or natural history of New South Wales's history.

The Mountain View homestead and General Store has significance at a local level through its association with David Smith Todd an unusual man who contributed to the cultural life of the growing local community through his writings, public lectures and political activities which included standing for the Seat of Macquarie elections in 1898 on a ticket advocating free trade, the advancement of agriculture, Federation and suffrage for women.

The place is important in demonstrating aesthetic characteristics and/or a high degree of creative or technical achievement in New South Wales.

Mountain View homestead and General Store is likely to have aesthetical and technical heritage significance at a State level as the only known two storey wattle and daub dwelling in NSW. Its unusual attention to the details of decorative features demonstrates the creative and innovative achievement of David Todd who built the dwelling in the French Renaissance style. It is unusual in its marriage of crude construction techniques and locally obtained materials with highly decorative architectural features.

The architectural features include the timber upstairs balconies, with their hipped roofs and finials and timber balustrades, the carved timber veranda valances and posts, the decorative features and colours in architraves and render mountings and fanlights above all internal doors. All these features are highly unusual in a wattle and daub constructed dwelling.

The construction methods are well demonstrated despite deterioration, with the timber posts placed 400–600 mm apart, crossed with lathe and infilled with mud and stone . The timbers for the dwelling were milled from timber on the property and the mud was obtained from a nearby gulley. The walls were rendered with lime plaster, concealing the framework and mud infill and giving the dwelling a less primitive appearance than many homes constructed using similar techniques and materials.

The place has potential to yield information that will contribute to an understanding of the cultural or natural history of New South Wales.

The Mountain View homestead and General Store is likely to be of State significance as it provides a clear demonstration of early construction techniques. It also provides a unique insight into the development of these techniques and architectural development in the late colonial period.

The place possesses uncommon, rare or endangered aspects of the cultural or natural history of New South Wales.

The Mountain View homestead and adjoining General Store is likely to be of State significance as the only known two storey wattle and daub dwelling in the state if not Australia and is thus a rare example of its type.
