= Monte Vista, California =

Monte Vista, California may refer to:

- Monte Vista, Placer County, California

== See also ==
- Monta Vista, Cupertino, California
- Monte Vista, an area of Southwestern San Bernardino County was incorporated (1956) and renamed (1958) as Montclair, California
