= Monte Vista (Philadelphia, Pennsylvania) =

- U.S. National Register of Historic Places
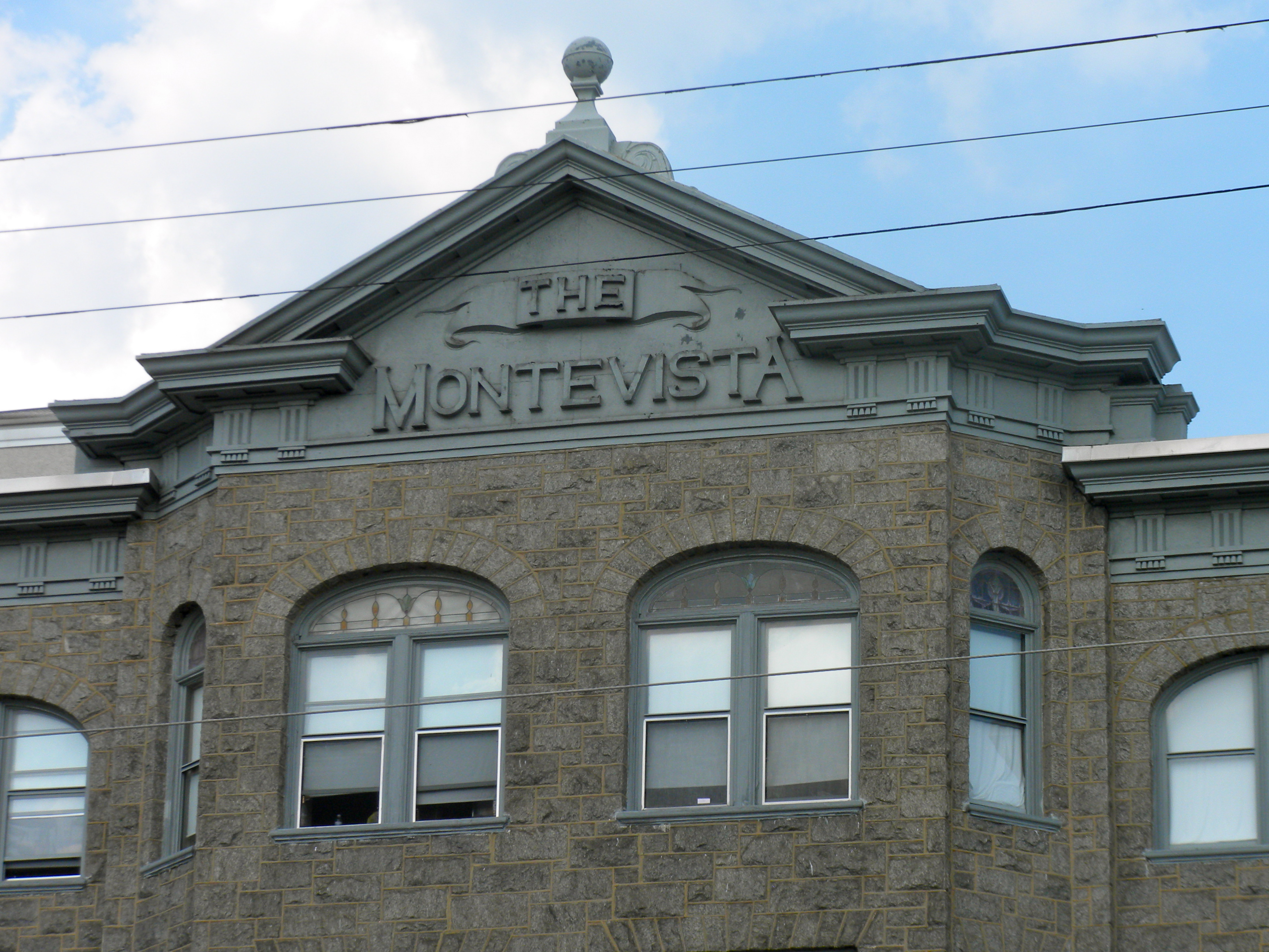
- Monte Vista Apartments detail, June 2010

- Location within Philadelphia Location within Pennsylvania Location within the United States
- Location: 917-931 N. 63rd St., 6154-6160 Oxford St., 6151-6157 Nasseau St., Philadelphia, Pennsylvania
- Coordinates: 39°58′45″N 75°14′46″W
- Area: 2 acres (0.81 ha)
- Built: 1910-1921
- Architect: Crawford, Daniel, Jr.; Fernald, James C.
- NRHP reference No.: 83002275
- Added to NRHP: March 3, 1983

Monte Vista is a historic apartment complex located in the Overbrook neighborhood of Philadelphia, Pennsylvania. The complex consists of four, four-story stone buildings constructed in 1910, 1915, 1916, and 1921.

It was added to the National Register of Historic Places in 1983.
