= Mountain View (Chatham, Virginia) =

Historic house in Virginia, United States

- U.S. National Register of Historic Places
- Virginia Landmarks Register
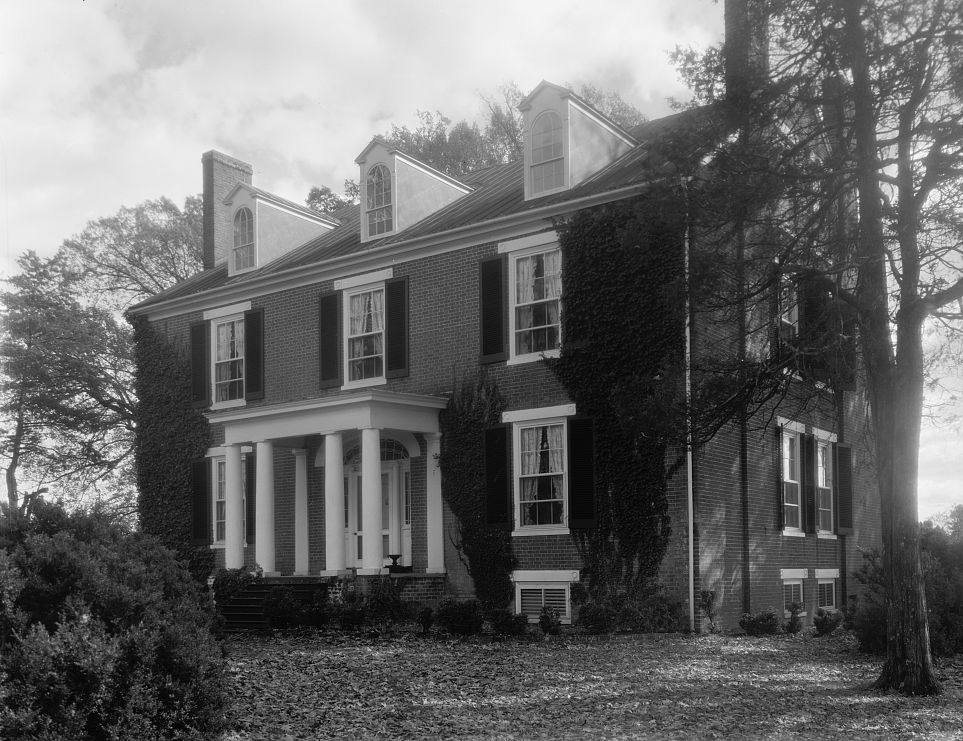
- Front of the house

- Location within Virginia Location within the United States
- Location: 2 mi. S of Chatham on VA 703, near Chatham, Virginia
- Coordinates: 36°47′00″N 79°24′13″W
- Area: 44 acres (18 ha)
- Built: c. 1840-1842
- Built by: Dejarnett, James
- Architectural style: Federal
- NRHP reference No.: 79003066
- VLR No.: 071-0025

Significant dates
- Added to NRHP: September 10, 1979
- Designated VLR: June 19, 1979

Mountain View is a historic home near Chatham, Pittsylvania County, Virginia. The house was built about 1840–1842, and is a 2 1/2-story, Late Federal-style brick dwelling. It is topped by a gable roof and has a double-pile central-hall plan. Also on the property are the contributing original kitchen building, schoolhouse, office, smokehouse, and corn crib. The property also contains remnants of an elaborate 19th-century formal garden, a feature characteristic of the region's finer estates.

It was listed on the National Register of Historic Places in 1979.
