= Mountain View Elementary School =

Mountain View Elementary School may refer to:

Canada

- Mountain View Elementary School - Coquitlam, British Columbia - School District 43 Coquitlam
- Mountain View Elementary School - Nanaimo, British Columbia - School District 68 Nanaimo-Ladysmith
- Mountain View Elementary School - Revelstoke, British Columbia - School District 19 Revelstoke
- Mountain View Elementary School - Sparwood, British Columbia - School District 5 Southeast Kootenay
- Mountain View Elementary School - Collingwood, Ontario - Simcoe County District School Board
- Mountainview Elementary School - Otterburn Park, Quebec - Riverside School Board

United States

- Mountain View Elementary School - Goleta, California - Goleta Union School District
- Mountain View Elementary School - Visalia, California - Visalia Unified School District
- Mountain View Elementary School - Flanders, New Jersey - Mount Olive Township School District
- Mountain View Elementary School - Hays, North Carolina - Wilkes County Schools
- Mountain View Elementary School - Kingsley, Pennsylvania - Mountain View School District
- Mountain View Elementary School - Charlottesville, Virginia postal address - Albemarle County Public Schools
- Mountain View Elementary School - Purcellville, Virginia - Loudoun County Public Schools
- Mountain View Elementary School - Harrisonburg, Virginia - Rockingham County Public Schools

== See also ==
- Mountainview Elementary School
- Mountain View School - Ontario, California - Mountain View School District
- Mountain View School - Sullivan, Maine - Regional School Unit 24
