= Monte Vista High School =

Monte Vista High School may refer to:

- Monte Vista High School (Danville, California)
- Monte Vista High School (Spring Valley, California)
- Monte Vista Christian School, Watsonville, California
- Monte Vista High School in Whittier, California, from 1964 to 1979
- Monte Vista High School (Colorado)

== See also ==
- Monta Vista High School in Cupertino, California
