= Mount View High School =

Mount View High School may refer to:

- Mount View High School (Maine) in Thorndike, Maine
- Mount View Elementary School (Tennessee) in Nashville, Tennessee
- Mount View High School (West Virginia) in Welch, West Virginia
- Mount View High School (Cessnock) in Cessnock, New South Wales
- Mount View High School (1931–1974) in Greater Victoria, BC
