= Elk Mountain Hotel =

- U.S. National Register of Historic Places
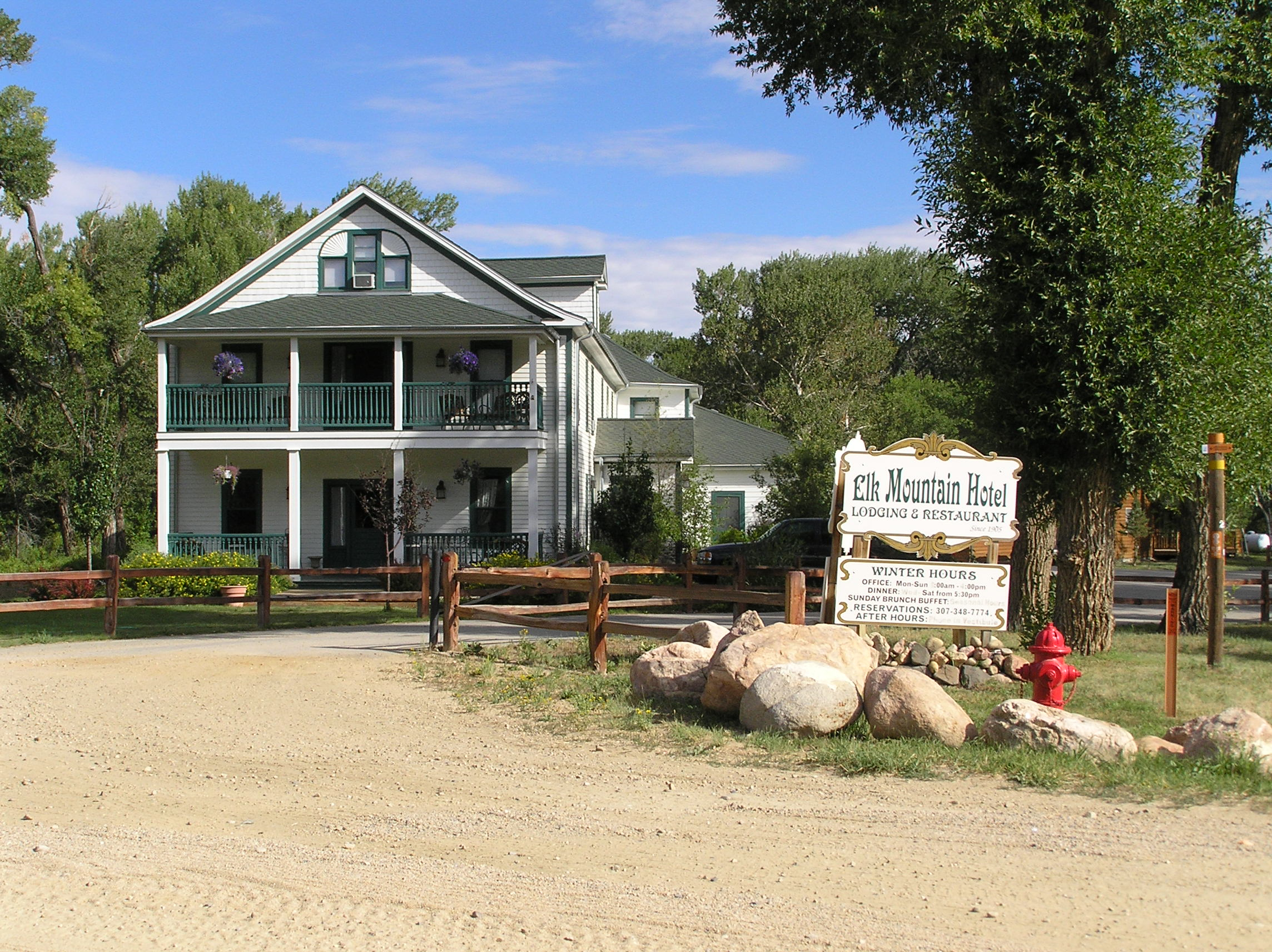
- Elk Mountain Hotel in 2006

- Location within Wyoming
- Location: Bridge St. and CR 402, Elk Mountain, Wyoming
- Coordinates: 41°41′15″N 106°24′40″W
- Area: 2.5 acres (1.0 ha)
- Built: 1905
- Built by: John S. Evans
- NRHP reference No.: 86003233
- Added to NRHP: October 10, 1986

The Elk Mountain Hotel, also known as the John S. Evans Hotel, Mountain View Hotel and Grandview Hotel was built in 1905 in Elk Mountain, Wyoming on the bank of the Medicine Bow River. The two-story wood-frame building was built next to the 1880 Garden Spot Pavilion, a dance hall that was a social center in an otherwise isolated portion of Wyoming. The hotel was built by John Evans, the owner of the Elk Mountain Saloon, who in 1903 had acquired the Pavilion. Evans catered to the mining trade through the 1930s. By that time better roads allowed tourism to increase, and the hotel provided accommodation to hunters and tourists. Evans sold the property in 1947 to Mark and Lucille Jackson, who remodeled the hotel and the pavilion.

The hotel features a two-story porch on the narrow front facade. Guest rooms are primarily on the second floor, with public rooms below.

The Garden Spot Pavilion was built in 1880 by John S. Jones and expanded in 1920 by Evans. The pavilion attracted major bands during the Big Band Era as well as country and western musicians. Despite the town's isolation patrons would travel up to 200 miles (320 km) and bands would play to a packed house. The pavilion featured a sprung dance floor, accomplished by laying the finish floor over widely spaced pine logs, encircled by seating areas. The exterior featured a stepped false front that concealed the gabled roof. Performers playing at the Garden Spot included Lawrence Welk, Tommy Dorsey, Louis Armstrong, Hank Thompson and Jim Reeves. The pavilion was demolished in the early 2000s after it had become deteriorated.

The Elk Mountain Hotel and the now-demolished Garden Spot Pavilion were placed on the National Register of Historic Places on October 10, 1986.
