= Rockhound State Park =

State park in New Mexico, United States

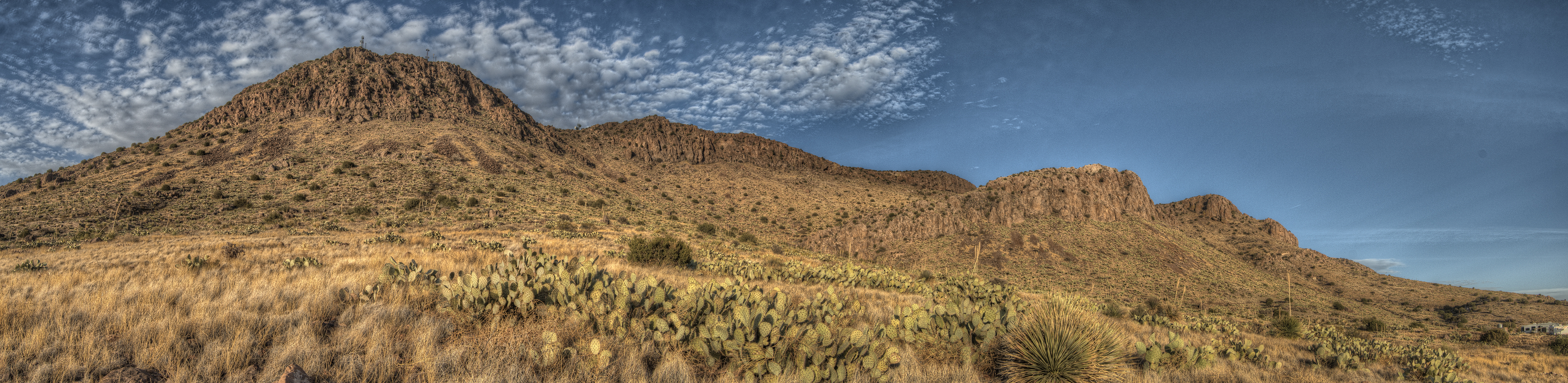

- Location within New Mexico
- Location: Luna County, New Mexico, United States
- Coordinates: 32°11′09″N 107°36′43″W
- Area: 1,100 acres (450 ha)
- Elevation: 4,520–5,400 ft (1,380–1,650 m)
- Established: 1965
- Administrator: New Mexico State Parks Division
- Website: Official website

Rockhound State Park is a state park of New Mexico, United States, located 7 miles (11 km) southeast of Deming. It is named for the abundance of minerals in the area, and visitors can search for quartz crystals, geodes, jasper, perlite, and many other minerals. When the park opened in 1966, it was the first park in the United States to allow collection of rocks and minerals for personal use.

The park consists of two units. The main park is located in the Little Florida Mountains and includes camping areas. The Spring Canyon Recreation Area is located to the southwest in the northern Florida Mountains and is open only for day use.

== Geology ==
Both units of the park are located in areas of Tertiary volcanic rock. The Little Florida Mountains, where the main unit is located, was covered with volcanic ash around 33.5 million years ago. This may be Oak Creek Tuff erupted from the Juniper caldera in the Animas Mountains to the west. Other vents, now impossible to find, erupted andesite over the tuff 28.5 million years ago. These rock beds, and associated beds of fanglomerate (coarse debris eroded from the volcanic rock), were intruded by small volumes of rhyolite between 26 and 24 million years ago.

Though volcanism was brief and limited, hydrothermal circulation continued for a long time after the eruptions, producing mineral veins, geodes, "thunder eggs", and other interesting and valuable mineral resources. The area was mined for precious metals, copper, lead, manganese, and fluorite from about 1880 to 1956.

== Gallery ==
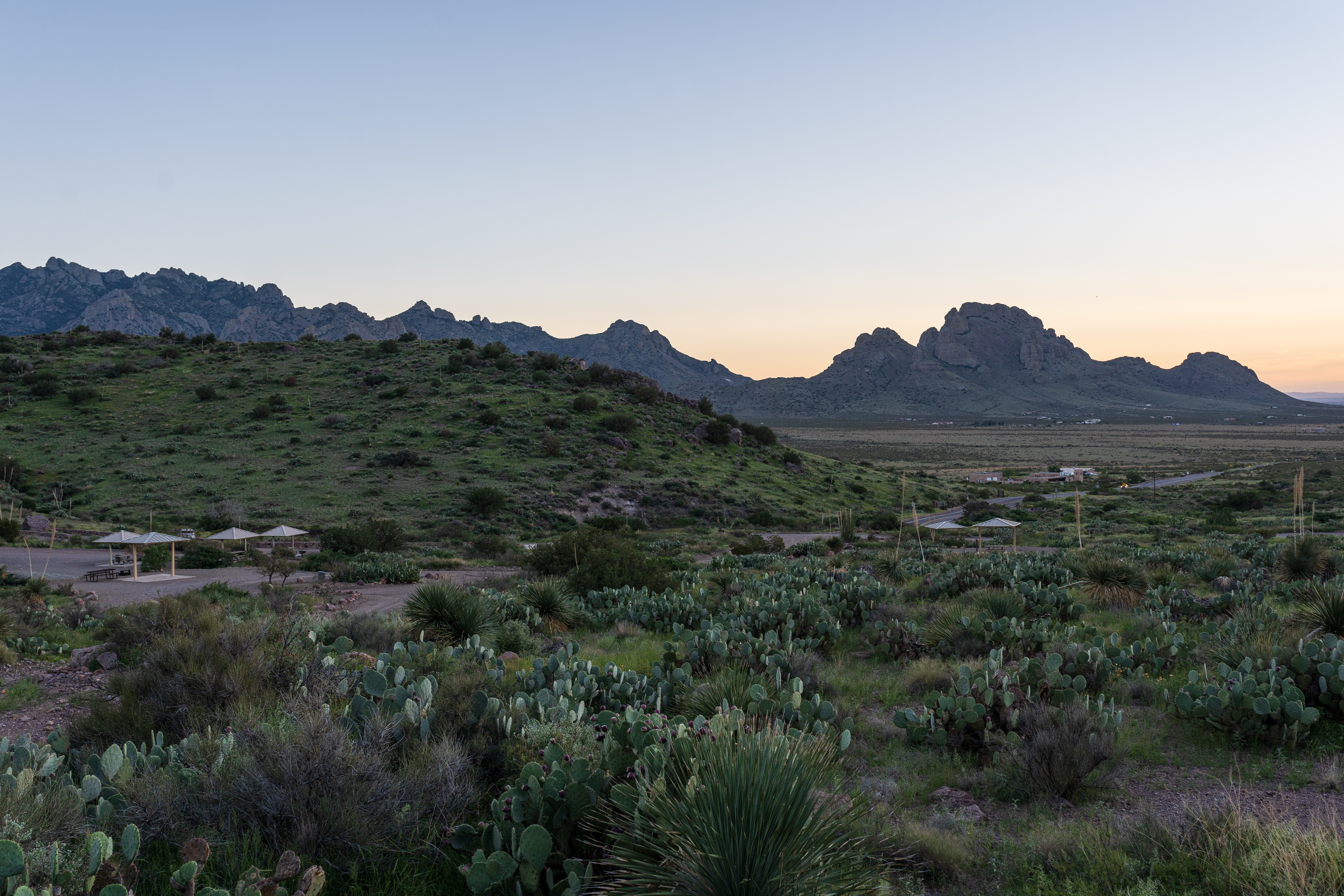
Looking out over the non-electric site camping area, day use area, and visitors center. Dragon Ridge is visible in the background

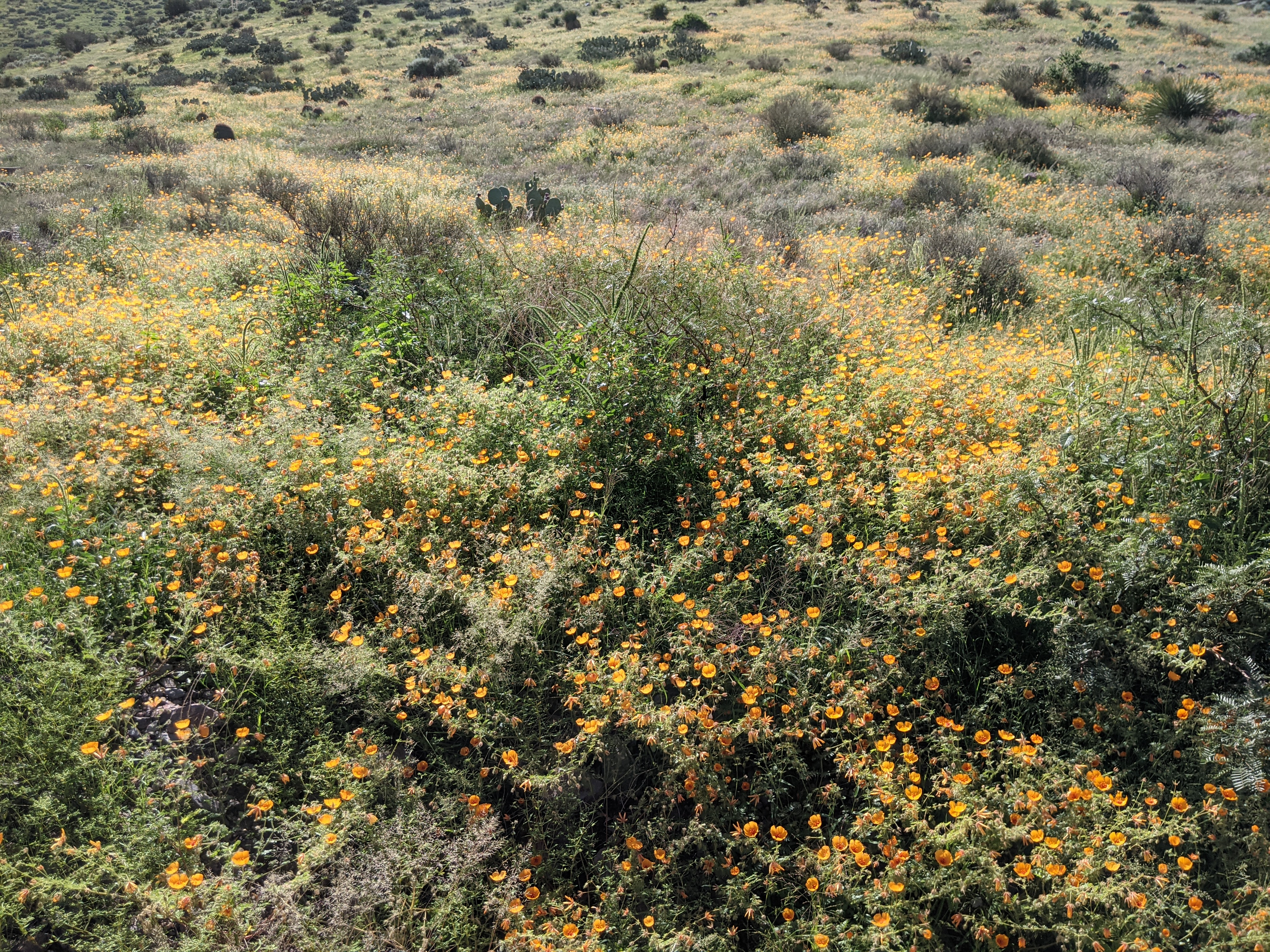
Kallstroemia grandiflora spreads out across a hillside at Rockhound State Park
