= Deming Public Schools =

Public school district in New Mexico, US

Deming Public Schools is a public school district headquartered in Deming, New Mexico, United States.

The district serves the city of Deming and the village of Columbus as well as all other areas in Luna County.

== Services to residents of Palomas, Chihuahua ==
Deming Public Schools buses U.S. citizen students residing in Mexico (including the city of Palomas) from the United States-Mexico border to Columbus Elementary and to upper grades in Deming. As of the 2013–2014 school year, 421 residents of Palomas attend the schools of Deming Public Schools. Many children living in Palomas are U.S. citizens because the U.S. federal and New Mexico state policies allow women in Palomas to give birth in the nearest hospital, which is in Deming, on the U.S. side of the border. Being born in the United States automatically confers citizenship. Due to the school fees at the public schools in Palomas, the English-language education, and the higher quality facilities in the Deming Public Schools campuses, many parents resident in Palomas prefer to send their children to the schools in the United States.

To avoid having children travel down a two-lane road, the superintendent of the Deming Public Schools ordered school buses to park at the border. Many of the parents of these students are unable to get visas into the United States and therefore are unable to travel to their children's schools or attend school functions. Viridiana Chacon, the principal of Columbus Elementary, used Skype to communicate with parents living in Mexico.

The first border crossings to American schools began in 1949. The tradition began when the principal of the elementary school in Columbus allowed children of one father living in Mexico to send his children to the school, and the school district began accepting students living in Mexico. At first, the district allowed non-U.S. citizens to attend. Around the 1970s Luna County began requiring U.S. citizenship in order for children to attend schools, but the district continued accepting children not living in Luna County.

== Schools ==
All schools, except for Columbus Elementary, are located in Deming. Columbus Elementary is located in Columbus, New Mexico.

=== Secondary schools ===
==== Zoned schools ====
- Deming Intermediate School (6)
- Red Mountain Middle School (7–8)
- Deming High School (9–12)
- Early College High School (9–12)
- Mimbres Valley High School (9-12)

==== Charter schools ====
- Deming Cesar Chavez Charter High School (9–12)

=== Primary schools ===
==== PK–5 ====
- Bataan Elementary School
- Bell Elementary School
- Chaparral Elementary School
- Columbus Elementary School
  - Of the district's schools, this one is the closest to the United States-Mexico border. As of 2013, the school has 570 students. The school uses a dual immersion program where classes are taught in a pattern where they are entirely English in one day and entirely in Spanish in another day. Almost 75% of the school's students live in Palomas, Chihuahua and have parents who are Mexicans. Almost all of the students are classified as English learners. About 94% of the students are classified as low income.
- Memorial Elementary School
- Ruben S Torres Elementary School

=== 3/4DD ===
- My Little School

== School Quality Scores ==
The State of New Mexico Public Education Department rates all school districts on a scale of A through F.
Scores for this district can be found at this web site:
http://aae.ped.state.nm.us/
