= National Register of Historic Places listings in Lea County, New Mexico =

Location of Lea County in New Mexico

This is a list of the National Register of Historic Places listings in Lea County, New Mexico.

This is intended to be a complete list of the properties and districts on the National Register of Historic Places in Lea County, New Mexico, United States. Latitude and longitude coordinates are provided for many National Register properties and districts; these locations may be seen together in a map.

There are 6 properties and 1 district listed on the National Register in the county. All of the places within the county on the National Register are also listed on the State Register of Cultural Properties.

This National Park Service list is complete through NPS recent listings posted March 14, 2025.

Contents: NRHP in New Mexico by county
Bernalillo – Catron – Chaves – Cibola – Colfax – Curry – De Baca – Doña Ana – Eddy – Grant – Guadalupe – Harding – Hidalgo – Lea – Lincoln – Los Alamos – Luna – McKinley – Mora – Otero – Quay – Rio Arriba – Roosevelt – San Juan – San Miguel – Sandoval – Santa Fe – Sierra – Socorro – Taos – Torrance – Union – Valencia

== Current listings ==
	Name on the Register	Image	Date listed	Location	City or town	Description
1	Laguna Plata Archeological District	Laguna Plata Archeological District	September 14, 1989 (#89001209)	Address Restricted	Hobbs	
2	Lea County Courthouse	Lea County Courthouse	December 7, 1987 (#87000880)	100 block of Main St. 32°56′46″N 103°20′51″W	Lovington	
3	Lea Theater	Lea Theater	January 17, 2007 (#06001251)	106 E. Central St. 32°56′59″N 103°20′54″W	Lovington	
4	Lovington Fire Department Building		July 2, 2008 (#08000574)	209 S Love St. 32°56′49″N 103°20′51″W	Lovington	part of the New Deal in New Mexico Multiple Property Submission
5	Pyburn House		December 13, 1995 (#95001429)	203 4th St. 32°56′58″N 103°21′13″W	Lovington	
6	Mathew Elmore Sewalt House		July 19, 2006 (#06000634)	121 E. Jefferson Ave. 32°57′12″N 103°20′52″W	Lovington	

== See also ==
- List of National Historic Landmarks in New Mexico
- National Register of Historic Places listings in New Mexico
