= National Register of Historic Places listings in Union County, New Mexico =

Location of Union County in New Mexico

This is a list of the National Register of Historic Places listings in Union County, New Mexico.

This is intended to be a complete list of the properties and districts on the National Register of Historic Places in Union County, New Mexico, United States. Latitude and longitude coordinates are provided for many National Register properties and districts; these locations may be seen together in a map.

There are 11 properties and districts listed on the National Register in the county, including 1 National Historic Landmark. One former site on the Register is located within the county. All of the places within the county on the National Register are also listed on the State Register of Cultural Properties.

This National Park Service list is complete through NPS recent listings posted February 27, 2026.

Contents: NRHP in New Mexico by county
Bernalillo – Catron – Chaves – Cibola – Colfax – Curry – De Baca – Doña Ana – Eddy – Grant – Guadalupe – Harding – Hidalgo – Lea – Lincoln – Los Alamos – Luna – McKinley – Mora – Otero – Quay – Rio Arriba – Roosevelt – San Juan – San Miguel – Sandoval – Santa Fe – Sierra – Socorro – Taos – Torrance – Union – Valencia

== Current listings ==
	Name on the Register	Image	Date listed	Location	City or town	Description
1	Amistad Gymnasium	Amistad Gymnasium	March 15, 1996 (#96000264)	0.5 miles east of State Road 402; 35°55′12″N 103°09′13″W	Amistad	Capulin Volcano National Monument Historic District, 46 Volcano Highway, Capulin, MP100012378, LISTED, 12/19/2025
2	Capulin Volcano National Monument Historic District	Capulin Volcano National Monument Historic District	December 19, 2025 (#100012378)	46 Volcano Highway; 36°46′43″N 103°58′47″W	Capulin	Historic district covering Mission 66 facilities at the monument.
3	Clayton Public Library	Clayton Public Library	December 20, 2002 (#02001550)	116 Walnut St. 36°27′03″N 103°10′59″W	Clayton	
4	Clayton Public Schools Historic District	Clayton Public Schools Historic District	March 15, 1996 (#96000269)	Four blocks in southeastern Clayton centered on 6th and Cedar Sts. 36°26′59″N 103°10′33″W	Clayton	
5	Eklund Hotel	Eklund Hotel	January 17, 2002 (#01001470)	15 Main St. 36°27′06″N 103°11′03″W	Clayton	
6	Folsom Hotel	Folsom Hotel	May 14, 1987 (#87000726)	Southwestern corner of the junction of Grand Ave. and Wall St. 36°50′41″N 103°55′08″W	Folsom	
7	Gate, Fence and Hollow Tree Shelter Designed by Dionicio Rodriguez	Gate, Fence and Hollow Tree Shelter Designed by Dionicio Rodriguez	November 25, 2008 (#08001138)	320 Oak St. 36°27′01″N 103°10′49″W	Clayton	
8	Goodson Memorial School	Goodson Memorial School	January 8, 2003 (#02001693)	State Road 456, approximately 4 miles west of its junction with State Road 406; 36°55′07″N 103°05′30″W	Seneca	
9	Luna Theater	Luna Theater	January 17, 2007 (#06001252)	2-6 Main St. 36°27′11″N 103°11′07″W	Clayton	
10	Rabbit Ears	Rabbit Ears	October 15, 1966 (#66000499)	Northwest of Clayton; 36°35′32″N 103°13′28″W	Clayton	
11	Union County Courthouse	Union County Courthouse	December 7, 1987 (#87000891)	Court St. 36°26′58″N 103°11′13″W	Clayton	

== Former listing ==
	Name on the Register	Image	Date listed	Date removed	Location	City or town	Description
1	McNees Crossing Site		October 6, 1970 (#70000903)	March 25, 1971	N. Canadian River near State Road 18	Seneca	Delisted due to duplication of the site in the Rabbit Ears listing.

== See also ==
- List of National Historic Landmarks in New Mexico
- National Register of Historic Places listings in New Mexico
