= Texas State Highway 102 =

State highway in Texas

State Highway 102
- SH 102, highlighted in red

Route information
- Maintained by TxDOT
- Length: 22.761 mi (36.630 km)
- Existed: 1990 (signed in 1955)–present

Major junctions
- West end: NM 421 near Sedan, NM
- East end: US 87 near Dalhart

Location
- Country: United States
- State: Texas
- Counties: Dallam

Highway system
- Highways in Texas; Interstate; US; State; Former; Toll; Loops; Spurs; FM/RM; Park; Rec
← SH 101	→ SH 103

State Highway 102 (SH 102) is a state highway in the U.S. state of Texas maintained by the Texas Department of Transportation (TxDOT). The highway begins at the New Mexico state line near Sedan, New Mexico as a continuation of New Mexico State Road 421 ending at U.S. Route 87 near Dalhart. SH 102 is located in southwestern and south central Dallam County and does not pass through any cities or towns. The highway was first designated in 1948 as a Farm to Market Road before eventually being upgraded to its current highway designation.

== Route description ==
SH 102 begins where NM 421, an 8.1-mile (13.0 km) route approaching from NM 402 between Clayton, New Mexico and Amistad, New Mexico, crosses the state line near Sedan. SH 102 intersects FM 296 to Texline just east of the state line. The highway has a short concurrency with FM 3110 before terminating at US 87 7.0 miles (11.3 km) northwest of Dalhart.

The 27.7-mile (44.6 km) rural highway passes through no cities or towns and intersects no major highways between its termini. SH 102 travels in a straight line for almost its entire length encountering only flat High Plains terrain.

== History ==
SH 102 was originally designated on February 17, 1925, from Claude to Panhandle. On May 4, 1925, SH 102 was also designated over a route from Taylor via Lexington to Caldwell in Williamson, Milam, Lee, and Burleson counties. On March 18, 1927, the route from Claude to Panhandle was renumbered as part of a new SH 117, leaving only one SH 102 from Taylor via Lexington to Caldwell. On October 20, 1931, SH 102 was cancelled. On March 2, 1932, SH 102 was restored from Taylor to Lexington only. This route was renamed FM 112 on October 24, 1944.

The current highway was first designated as Farm to Market Road 808 from the eastern terminus at US 87 to a point 13.3 miles (21.4 km) westward on July 20, 1948, along with FM 807 in the same county. The road was extended to the New Mexico state line on December 16, 1948. During the 1950s, NM 102 was extended eastward from Sedan to the state line meeting FM 808. On March 30, 1955, the Texas highway department began signing the road as SH 102 in conformance at that time with the New Mexico numbering, but the road officially retained its FM 808 designation. The portion of NM 102 approaching the state line was renumbered NM 421 in 1988. The road officially achieved its SH 102 designation on August 29, 1990, and the FM 808 designation was decommissioned.

== Major intersections ==
The entire route is in Dallam County.

Location	mi	km	Destinations	Notes
	0.0	0.0	NM 421 – Sedan, NM	Western terminus where roadway continues as NM 421 into Union County, NM
	0.0	0.0	FM 296 – Texline	
	9.3	15.0	FM 3110 south	Western end of FM 3110 concurrency
	9.4	15.1	FM 3110 north	Eastern end of FM 3110 concurrency
	22.7	36.5	US 87 – Dalhart, Texline	Eastern terminus
1.000 mi = 1.609 km; 1.000 km = 0.621 mi: Concurrency terminus
