= Goodson Memorial School =

- U.S. National Register of Historic Places
- NM State Register of Cultural Properties
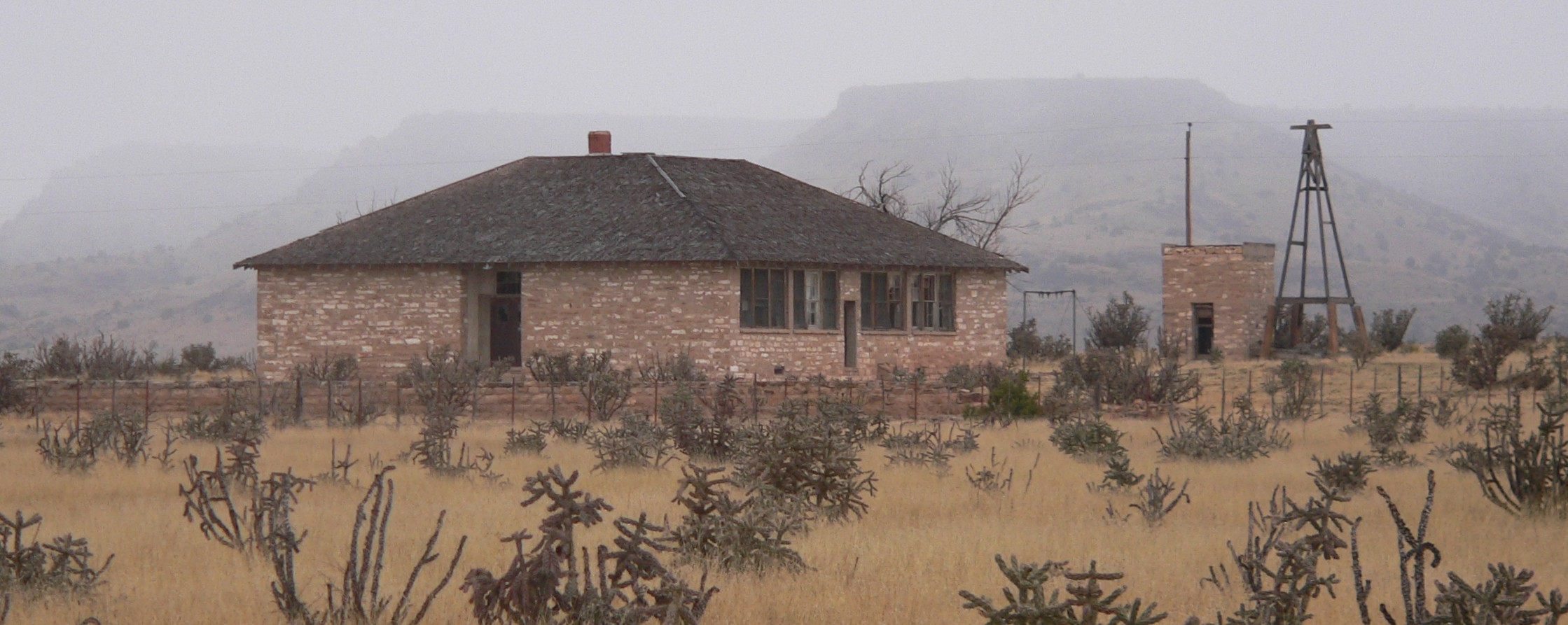
- View from Southeast

- Location within New Mexico
- Location: State Road 456, approximately 4 miles west of its junction with State Road 406
- Nearest city: Seneca, New Mexico
- Coordinates: 36°55′07″N 103°05′30″W
- Area: 2 acres (0.81 ha)
- Built: 1936
- Built by: Works Progress Administration
- MPS: New Deal in New Mexico MPS
- NRHP reference No.: 02001693
- NMSRCP No.: 1806

Significant dates
- Added to NRHP: January 8, 2003
- Designated NMSRCP: February 1, 2002

The Goodson Memorial School, in Union County, New Mexico near Seneca was built in 1936 by the Works Progress Administration. It has also been known as the Goodson School. It was listed on the National Register of Historic Places in 2003; the listing included one contributing building, three other contributing structures, and one contributing site.

It was deemed significant as one of few surviving WPA school buildings in northeast New Mexico. The school was a four-room building built at cost of $6,000 which provided construction jobs, and which achieved consolidation of three former rural schools in the Dry Cimarron Valley. It was rural itself and at one point served 50 to 60 students in grades 1-10. It served until the 1960s when busing students to a larger school in Clayton became feasible. It was named for Felix Emmett Goodson, the county commissioner who achieved construction of the school, who was also a rancher; he managed Roberts Ranch, located just to the northeast of the school site; his wife Stella Goodson was a teacher at one of the schools consolidated. The school became a local community center; the community came to be called Goodson; the school was last used for voting in 1962 and has since been empty.

== See also ==
- National Register of Historic Places listings in Union County, New Mexico
