= National Register of Historic Places listings in Harding County, New Mexico =

Location of Harding County in New Mexico

This is a list of the National Register of Historic Places listings in Harding County, New Mexico.

This is intended to be a complete list of the properties and districts on the National Register of Historic Places in Harding County, New Mexico, United States. Latitude and longitude coordinates are provided for many National Register properties and districts; these locations may be seen together in a map.

There are 2 properties listed on the National Register in the county. Both of the places within the county on the National Register are also listed on the State Register of Cultural Properties.

This National Park Service list is complete through NPS recent listings posted June 6, 2026.

Contents: NRHP in New Mexico by county
Bernalillo – Catron – Chaves – Cibola – Colfax – Curry – De Baca – Doña Ana – Eddy – Grant – Guadalupe – Harding – Hidalgo – Lea – Lincoln – Los Alamos – Luna – McKinley – Mora – Otero – Quay – Rio Arriba – Roosevelt – San Juan – San Miguel – Sandoval – Santa Fe – Sierra – Socorro – Taos – Torrance – Union – Valencia

== Current listings ==
	Name on the Register	Image	Date listed	Location	City or town	Description
1	Bueyeros School		March 15, 1996 (#96000265)	State Road 102, 0.25 miles west of Bueyeros Church; 35°58′49″N 103°41′12″W	Bueyeros	
2	Harding County Courthouse	Harding County Courthouse	December 7, 1987 (#87000895)	Pine St. 35°46′30″N 103°57′24″W	Mosquero	

== See also ==
- List of National Historic Landmarks in New Mexico
- National Register of Historic Places listings in New Mexico
