= New Mexico State Road 421 =

State highway in New Mexico, United States

State Road 421
- NM 421 highlighted in red

Route information
- Maintained by NMDOT
- Length: 8.101 mi (13.037 km)
- Existed: 1988–present

Major junctions
- West end: NM 402 near Sedan
- East end: SH 102 at the Texas state line

Location
- Country: United States
- State: New Mexico
- Counties: Union

Highway system
- New Mexico State Highway System; Interstate; US; State; Scenic
← NM 420	→ NM 423

State Road 421 (NM 421) is a 8.101-mile-long (13.037 km) state highway in the U.S. state of New Mexico maintained by the New Mexico Department of Transportation (NMDOT). The road, located in southeastern Union County, begins at NM 402 between Amistad and Clayton and passes eastward through the town of Sedan to the Texas state line where the roadway continues as Texas State Highway 102 (SH 102) to U.S. Route 87 (US 87) near Dalhart, Texas. Before 1988, the road was part of a much longer NM 102.

== Route description ==
The 8.1-mile (13.0 km) two-lane road begins at a t-intersection with NM 402 south of Clayton and west of Sedan in rural Union County. The highway passes through farmland as it travels east before it enters the small town of Sedan, serving as the town's main east-west road. After leaving Sedan, the highway traverses more farmland before terminating at the New Mexico–Texas state line just west of Farm to Market Road 296 (FM 296). The highway continues east into Dallam County, Texas as Texas State Highway 102 (SH 102) until it terminates at US 87 northwest of Dalhart.

== History ==

NM 421 was originally designated as NM 102 between the current NM 402, then part of a northern extension of NM 18, and Sedan in the 1940s. In the following decade, the road was extended southward along NM 18 then westward through Bueyeros and eastward to the state line meeting up with Texas's FM 808 which was then re-signed continuously as SH 102 in 1955. Both NM 421 and NM 402 received their current designations during the 1988 renumbering of the New Mexico highway system.

== Major intersections ==
The entire route is in Union County.

Location	mi	km	Destinations	Notes
	0.000	0.000	NM 402 – Amistad, Clayton	Western terminus
	8.101	13.037	SH 102 – Dalhart	Eastern terminus, roadway continues as SH 102
1.000 mi = 1.609 km; 1.000 km = 0.621 mi
