= Wheeless, Oklahoma =

Unincorporated community in Oklahoma, US

- Unincorporated community
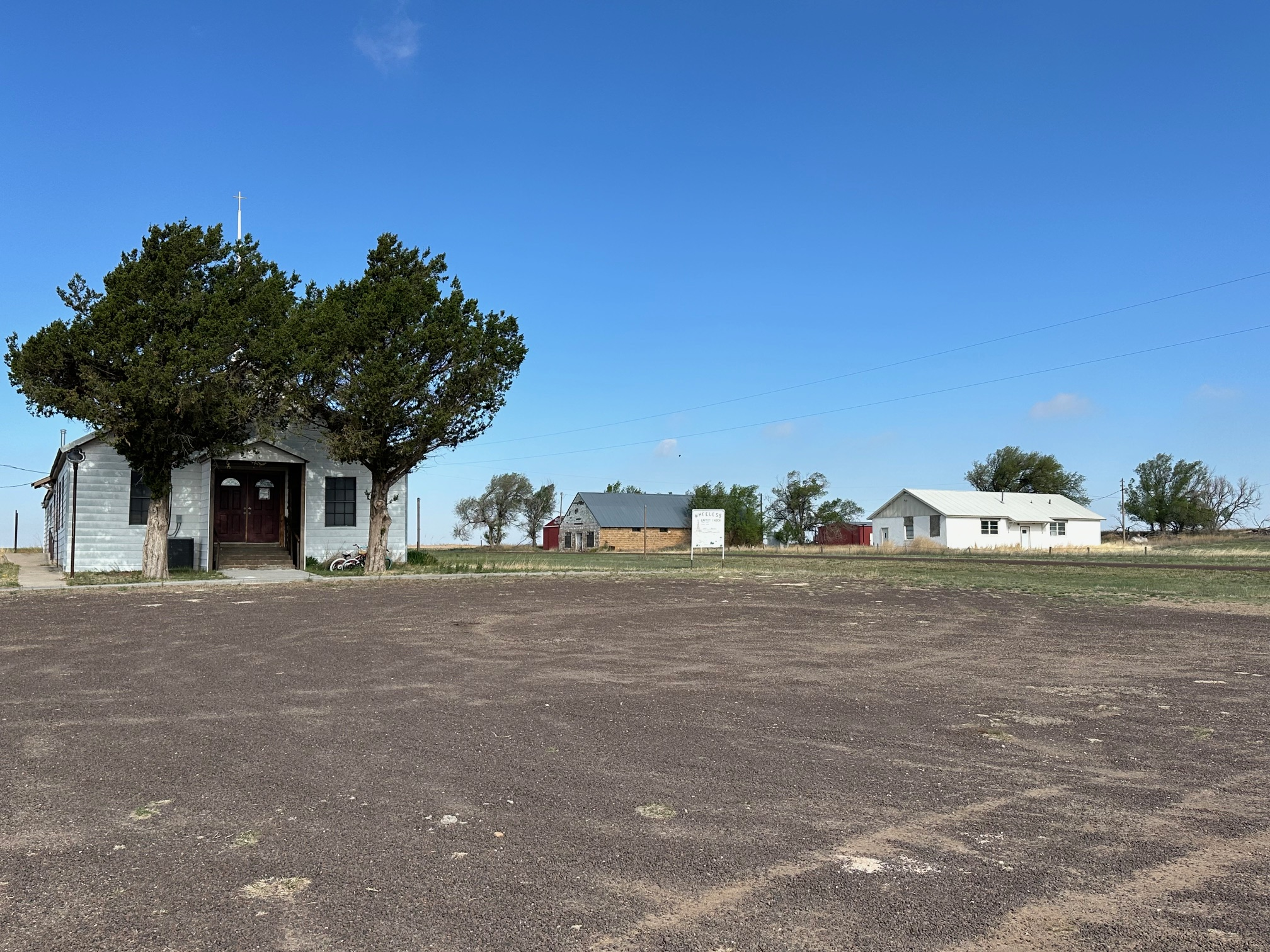
- Wheeless in April 2024

- Location within the state of Oklahoma Wheeless (the United States)
- Coordinates: 36°43′9″N 102°53′40″W
- Country: United States
- State: Oklahoma
- County: Cimarron
- Elevation: 4,675 ft (1,425 m)
- Time zone: UTC-6 (Central (CST))
  - Summer (DST): UTC-5 (CDT)
- GNIS feature ID: 1100935

Wheeless is an unincorporated community in Cimarron County, Oklahoma, United States. The post office was established February 12, 1907, and discontinued September 27, 1963. Nearby are the ruins of Camp Nichols, a military encampment on the Santa Fe Trail, which is a National Historic Landmark.

Wheeless is on E0200 Road; the New Mexico border is about 6 miles west. The closest highway access points are east and then north to Oklahoma State Highway 325 at the curve where that road turns north after running west from Boise City, or west and then south to the very short New Mexico State Road 410, which links to New Mexico State Road 406, about two miles to the west. The Texhomex benchmark, being the meeting point of Texas, Oklahoma, and New Mexico, is south-southwest of town.
