= New Mexico State Road 417 =

State highway in New Mexico, United States

State Road 417

Route information
- Maintained by NMDOT
- Length: 4.75 mi (7.64 km)

Major junctions
- Western end: NM 402 near Nara Visa
- Eastern end: RM 3296 near Nara Visa

Location
- Country: United States
- State: New Mexico
- Counties: Union

Highway system
- New Mexico State Highway System; Interstate; US; State; Scenic
← NM 416	→ NM 418

State Road 417 (NM 417) is a 4.75-mile-long (7.64 km) state highway in the US state of New Mexico. NM 417's western terminus is at NM 402 north of Nara Visa, and the eastern terminus is a continuation as Ranch to Market Road 3296 (RM 3296) at the Texas/ New Mexico border north-northeast of Nara Visa.

== Major intersections ==
The entire route is in Union County.

Location	mi	km	Destinations	Notes
	0.000	0.000	NM 402	Western terminus
	4.750	7.644	RM 3296	Eastern terminus, continues east as RM 3296
1.000 mi = 1.609 km; 1.000 km = 0.621 mi
