= New Mexico State Road 420 =

State highway in New Mexico, United States

State Road 420

Route information
- Maintained by NMDOT
- Length: 30.473 mi (49.042 km)

Major junctions
- West end: NM 102 ENE of Mosquero
- East end: NM 402 S of Amistad

Location
- Country: United States
- State: New Mexico
- Counties: Harding, Union

Highway system
- New Mexico State Highway System; Interstate; US; State; Scenic
← NM 419	→ NM 421

State Road 420 (NM 420) is a state highway in the US state of New Mexico. Its total length is approximately 30.4 miles (48.9 km). NM 420's western terminus is at NM 102 east-northeast of Mosquero, and the eastern terminus is at NM 402 south of Amistad.

== Major intersections ==
County	Location	mi	km	Destinations	Notes
Harding		0.000	0.000	NM 102	Western terminus
Union		30.473	49.042	NM 402	Eastern terminus
1.000 mi = 1.609 km; 1.000 km = 0.621 mi
