= James Magoffin =

James Magoffin may refer to:

- James Harrison Magoffin (1808–1885), farmer and original resident of the circa 1865 James Magoffin House (10748 Main Street, Clarence, New York)
- James Wiley Magoffin (1799–1868), land owner from Texas who tried to claim exclusive access to the Bottomless Lakes, an attempt foiled by the passage of New Mexico Statutes chapter 72, article 11, section 72-11-1
