= Bueyeros School =

- U.S. National Register of Historic Places
- NM State Register of Cultural Properties
- Location within New Mexico Location within the United States
- Location: NM 102, 0.25 mi. W of Bueyeros Church, Bueyeros, New Mexico
- Coordinates: 35°58′49″N 103°41′12″W
- Area: 1 acre (0.40 ha)
- Built: 1936
- Built by: WPA
- Architectural style: Mission/Spanish Revival
- MPS: New Deal in New Mexico MPS
- NRHP reference No.: 96000265
- NMSRCP No.: 1621

Significant dates
- Added to NRHP: March 15, 1996
- Designated NMSRCP: January 26, 1996

The Bueyeros School is a historic school building located on State Road 102 in Bueyeros, New Mexico. The school was built in 1936 by the Works Progress Administration as part of its efforts to combat rural unemployment in New Mexico. The Bueyeros area was part of New Mexico's section of the Dust Bowl, making the school project especially important to the area. The school was one of many rural schools built by the WPA in New Mexico; as may rural school districts lacked adequate facilities, school projects were a large and necessary part of the WPA's work in the state. The school has a plain Pueblo Revival design with a stucco exterior and stone drainage spouts on the east side.

The school was added to the National Register of Historic Places on March 15, 1996.

== See also ==
- National Register of Historic Places listings in Harding County, New Mexico
