= New Mexico State Road 409 =

State highway in New Mexico, United States

State Road 409
- NM 409 highlighted in red

Route information
- Maintained by NMDOT
- Length: 13.2 mi (21.2 km)

Major junctions
- South end: Bottomless Lakes State Park
- North end: US 380 near Roswell

Location
- Country: United States
- State: New Mexico
- Counties: Chaves

Highway system
- New Mexico State Highway System; Interstate; US; State; Scenic
← NM 408	→ NM 410

State Road 409 (NM 409) is a 13.2-mile-long (21.2 km) state highway in the US state of New Mexico. NM 409's southern terminus is at Bottomless Lakes State Park, and the northern terminus is at U.S. Route 380 (US 380) east of Roswell.

== Major intersections ==
The entire route is in Chaves County.

Location	mi	km	Destinations	Notes
	0.000	0.000	US 380	Northern terminus
	13.200	21.243	Bottomless Lakes State Park	Southern terminus
1.000 mi = 1.609 km; 1.000 km = 0.621 mi
