= Fort Nichols =

Fort Nichols could refer to:

- Fort Nichols (Massachusetts), a former fort in the state
- Fort Nichols (Oklahoma), another name for Camp Nichols
