= New Mexico State Road 32 =

State highway in New Mexico, United States

State Road 32
- NM 32 highlighted in red

Route information
- Maintained by NMDOT
- Length: 41.323 mi (66.503 km)

Major junctions
- South end: NM 12 in Apache Creek
- NM 103
- North end: US 60 in Quemado

Location
- Country: United States
- State: New Mexico
- Counties: Catron

Highway system
- New Mexico State Highway System; Interstate; US; State; Scenic
← NM 31	→ NM 34

State Road 32 (NM 32) is a 41.323-mile-long (66.503 km) state highway in Catron County in the U.S. state of New Mexico. It stretches from NM 12 in Apache Creek northward to U.S. Route 60 (US 60) in Quemado.

== Route description ==
Much of NM 32 runs through the Apache-Sitgreaves National Forest. Its southern terminus is at an intersection with NM 12 in the community of Apache Creek. From there, the road heads north, winding through the Gallo Mountains, before reaching its northern terminus in the town of Quemado at an intersection with US 60.

== History ==
When the state highways were first posted in the early 20th century, NM 32 was originally much longer, extending as far north as Shiprock. When the U.S. Highway System was established in 1926, much of this route was taken over by U.S. Route 666 (now U.S. Route 491). What is now NM 32 is a remnant of the former route that was not renumbered as a U.S. Highway.

== Major intersections ==
The entire route is in Catron County.

Location	mi	km	Destinations	Notes
Apache Creek	0.000	0.000	NM 12	Southern terminus
	33.912	54.576	NM 103 east	Western terminus of NM 103; to Quemado Lake
Quemado	41.323	66.503	US 60	Northern terminus
1.000 mi = 1.609 km; 1.000 km = 0.621 mi
