= Nara Visa School =

- U.S. National Register of Historic Places
- NM State Register of Cultural Properties
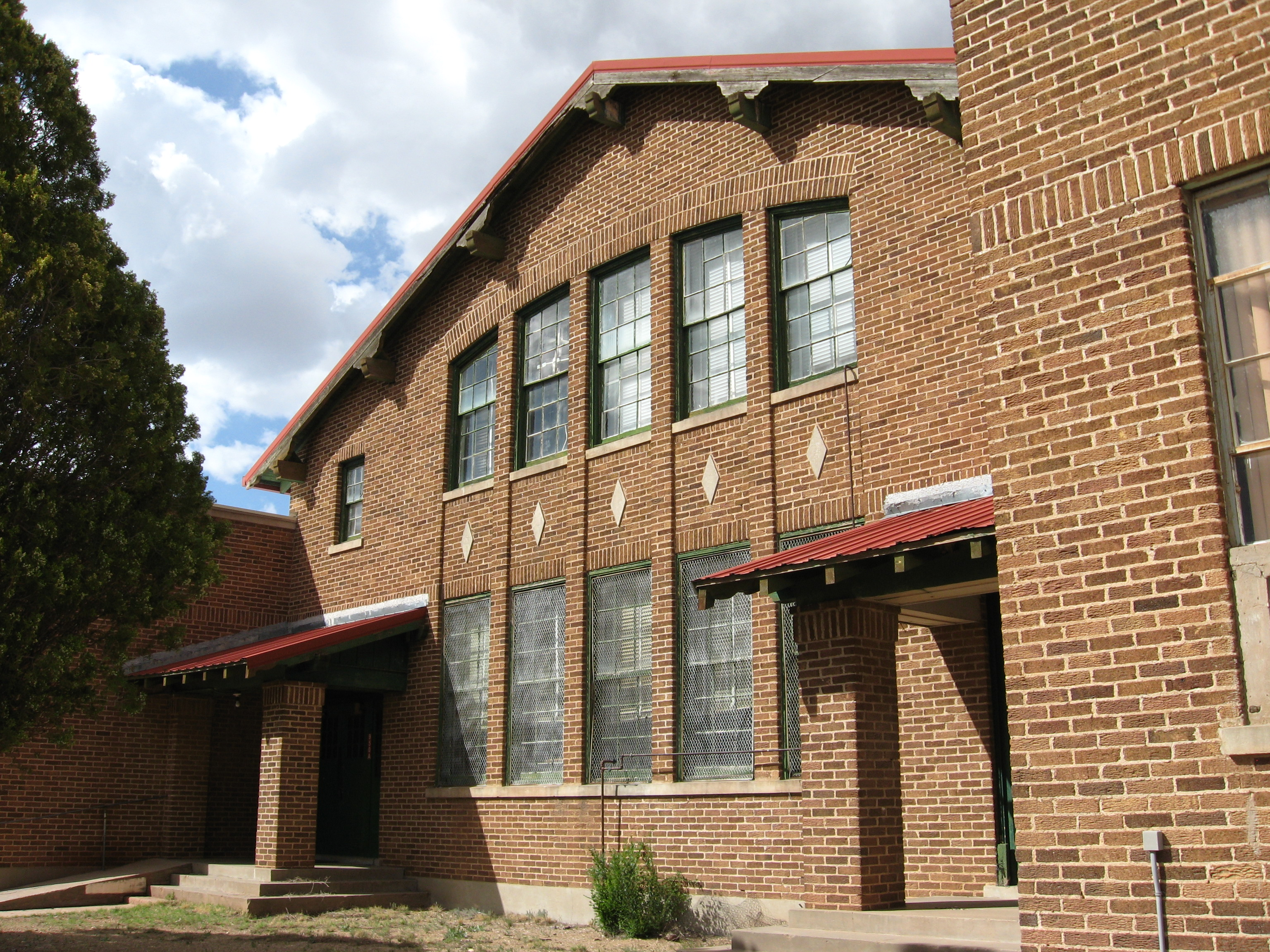
- Main building at Nara Visa School

- Location within New Mexico
- Location: US 54, Nara Visa, New Mexico
- Coordinates: 35°36′51″N 103°5′53″W
- Area: 4.5 acres (1.8 ha)
- Built: 1937
- Architect: Joseph Champ Berry
- NRHP reference No.: 83004151
- NMSRCP No.: 930

Significant dates
- Added to NRHP: October 31, 1983
- Designated NMSRCP: August 25, 1983

The Nara Visa School is a historic school building in Nara Visa, New Mexico. The school was built in 1921 during the settlement of eastern New Mexico. Architect Joseph Champ Berry, noted for his work in the Texas Panhandle, designed the Mission Revival building. While the building's plain facade and red tile roof are typical of the Mission Revival style, the wood corbel brackets along the roof reflect local vernacular designs and American Craftsman influences. A gymnasium built by the Works Progress Administration and several contributing outbuildings are also on the property. The school closed in 1968 and the building is now a community center. The site was added to the National Register of Historic Places in 1983.

== See also ==
- National Register of Historic Places in Quay County, New Mexico
