= Folsom Hotel =

- U.S. National Register of Historic Places
- NM State Register of Cultural Properties
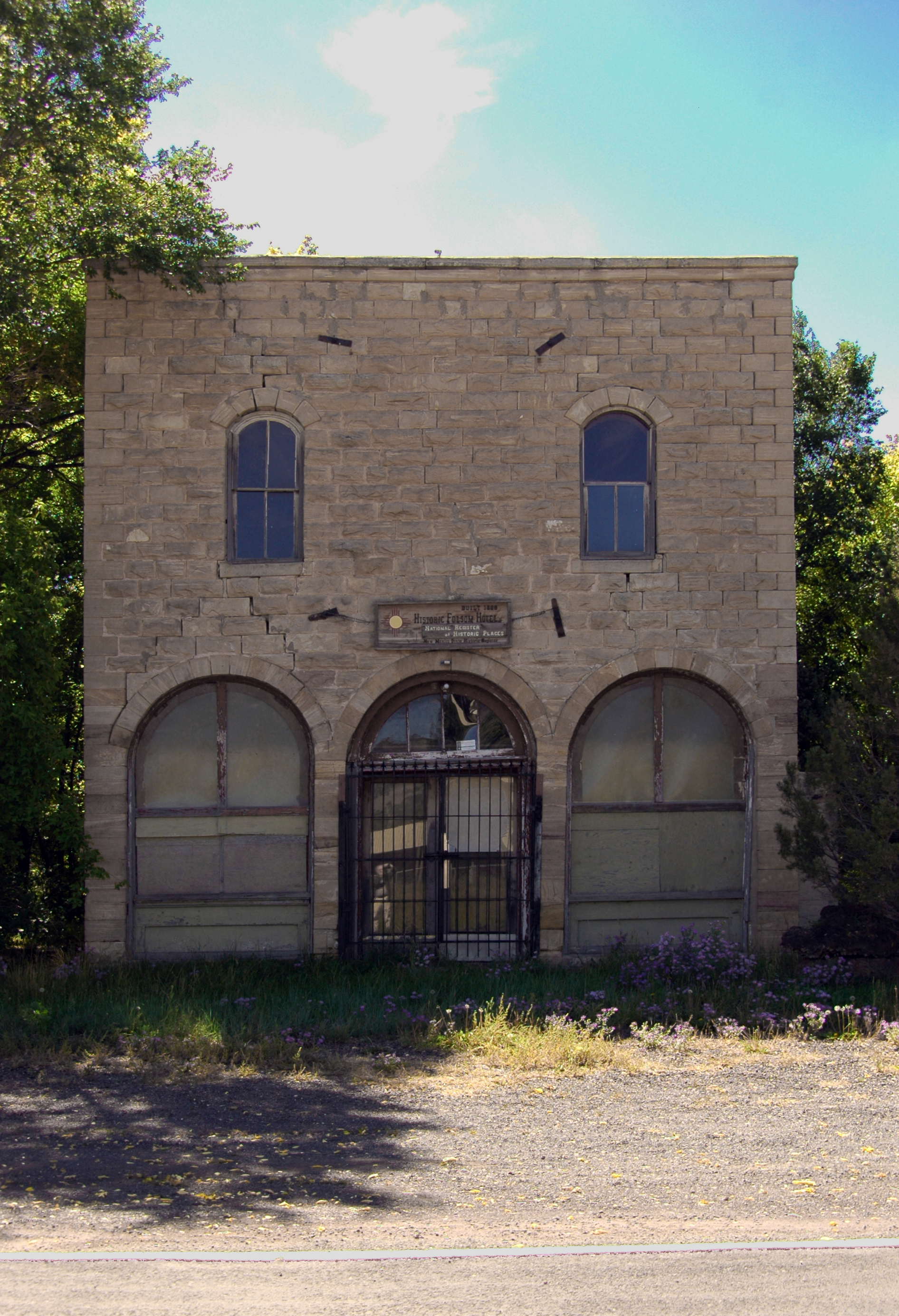

- Location within New Mexico
- Location: SW Jct. of Grand Ave. and Wall St., Folsom, New Mexico
- Coordinates: 36°50′41″N 103°55′8″W
- Area: less than one acre
- Built: 1888
- Built by: N. E. Quest, Jacinto Flores
- NRHP reference No.: 87000726
- NMSRCP No.: 85

Significant dates
- Added to NRHP: May 14, 1987
- Designated NMSRCP: July 18, 1969

The Folsom Hotel, at southwest of junction of Grand Ave. and Wall St. in Folsom, New Mexico, is a historic stone building built in 1888 that served as a department store and as a hotel. It was listed on the U.S. National Register of Historic Places in 1987.

The hotel was originally the Drew & Phillips General Mercantile Store; it was modified by John Odell in 1910 to serve as a hotel.

In 2009 it appeared long-abandoned. In another set of photos, undated, it appears to have been converted to a private residence.

== See also ==
- National Register of Historic Places listings in Union County, New Mexico
