= New Mexico State Road 410 =

State highway in New Mexico, United States

State Road 410

Route information
- Maintained by NMDOT
- Length: 1.942 mi (3.125 km)

Major junctions
- West end: NM 406 near Seneca
- East end: Oklahoma State Line Road at the Oklahoma/ New Mexico border

Location
- Country: United States
- State: New Mexico
- Counties: Union

Highway system
- New Mexico State Highway System; Interstate; US; State; Scenic
| ← NM 409 | → NM 411 |

State Road 410 (NM 410) is a 1.942-mile-long (3.125 km) state highway in the US state of New Mexico. NM 410's western terminus is at NM 406 northeast of Seneca, and the eastern terminus is a continuation as Oklahoma State Line Road at the Oklahoma/ New Mexico border.

== Major intersections ==
The entire route is in Union County.

| Location | mi | km | Destinations | Notes |
|---|---|---|---|---|
| | 0.000 | 0.000 | NM 406 | Western terminus |
| | 1.942 | 3.125 | Oklahoma State Line Road | Eastern terminus, continues as Oklahoma State Line Road |
1.000 mi = 1.609 km; 1.000 km = 0.621 mi
