= New Mexico State Road 103 =

State highway in New Mexico, United States

State Road 103
- NM 103 highlighted in red

Route information
- Maintained by NMDOT
- Length: 3.900 mi (6.276 km)

Major junctions
- West end: NM 32
- East end: End of state maintenance, FS 13?

Location
- Country: United States
- State: New Mexico
- Counties: Catron

Highway system
- New Mexico State Highway System; Interstate; US; State; Scenic
← NM 102	→ NM 104

State Road 103 (NM 103) is a state highway in the US state of New Mexico. Its total length is approximately 3.9 miles (6.3 km). NM 103's western terminus is NM 32 and the eastern terminus is where the state maintenance ends by Quemado Lake.

== Major intersections ==
The entire route is in Catron County.

Location	mi	km	Destinations	Notes
	0.000	0.000	NM 32	Western terminus
	3.900	6.276	End of state maintenance	Eastern terminus
1.000 mi = 1.609 km; 1.000 km = 0.621 mi
