= Amistad Gymnasium =

- U.S. National Register of Historic Places
- NM State Register of Cultural Properties
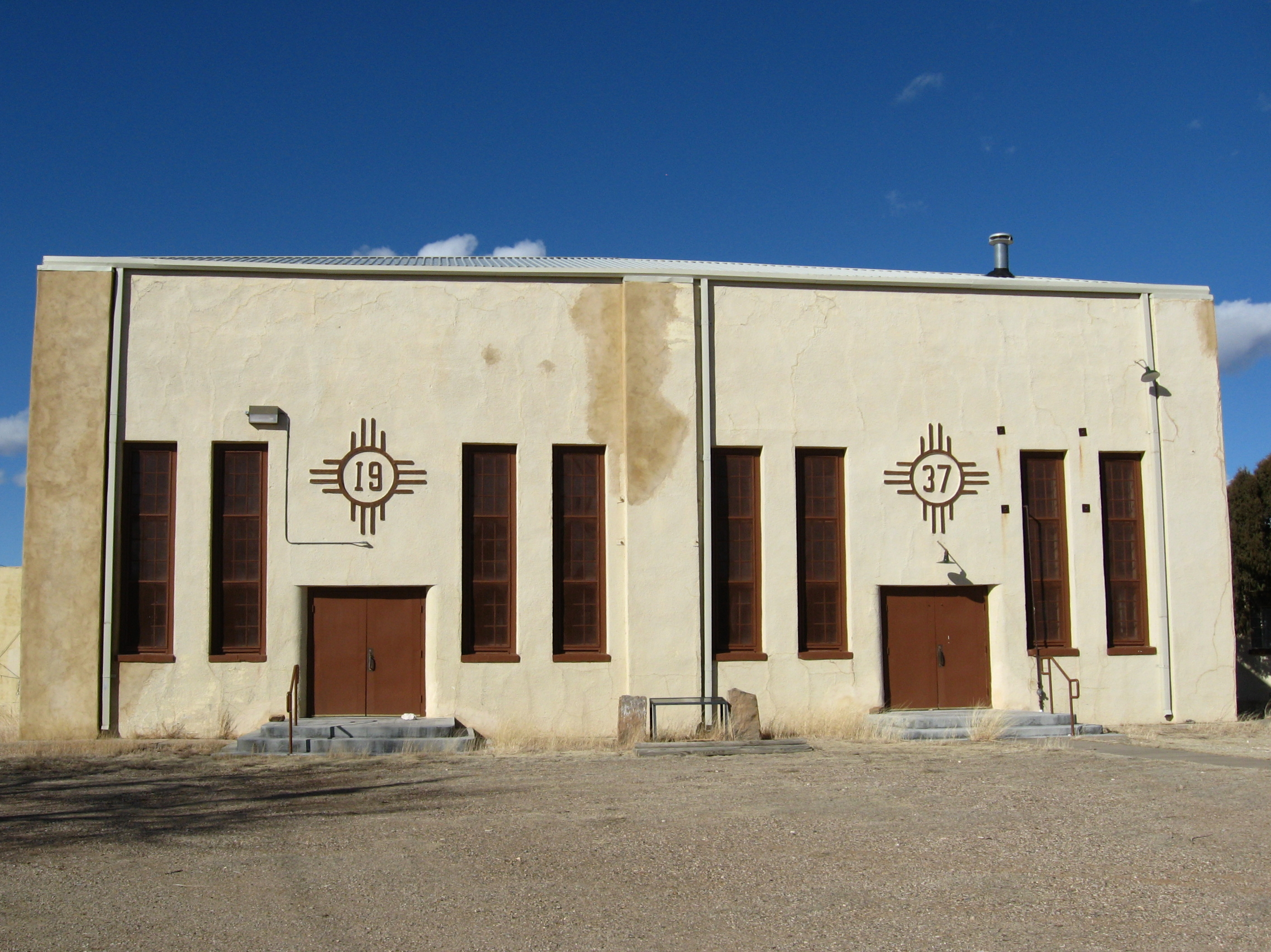
- Amistad Gymnasium

- Location within New Mexico
- Location: 0.5 mi. E of NM 402, Amistad, New Mexico
- Coordinates: 35°55′12″N 103°9′13″W
- Area: 1 acre (0.40 ha)
- Built: 1937
- Built by: WPA
- Architect: J. R. Islar
- Architectural style: Mission/Spanish Revival
- MPS: New Deal in New Mexico MPS
- NRHP reference No.: 96000264
- NMSRCP No.: 1622

Significant dates
- Added to NRHP: March 15, 1996
- Designated NMSRCP: January 26, 1996

The Amistad Gymnasium is a historic gymnasium located in Amistad, New Mexico. The gymnasium was proposed in 1935 by the Works Progress Administration; construction was completed in 1937. The WPA built many gymnasiums in rural New Mexico during the Great Depression, as these projects provided jobs and a community meeting place to residents. The gymnasium in Amistad was no different, as it created roughly 50 construction jobs and hosted community dances, gatherings, and sporting events. The building has a Pueblo Revival style design with Art Deco influences, reflecting the WPA's tradition of incorporating local styles into modern designs. Two Zia sun symbols on the front of the building denote its year of completion.

The gymnasium was added to the National Register of Historic Places in 1996.

== See also ==
- National Register of Historic Places listings in Union County, New Mexico
