= New Mexico State Road 562 =

Highway in New Mexico

State Road 562
- NM 562 highlighted in red

Route information
- Maintained by NMDOT
- Length: 19.562 mi (31.482 km)

Major junctions
- West end: End of state maintenance in Clapham
- East end: NM 402 near Clayton

Location
- Country: United States
- State: New Mexico
- Counties: Union

Highway system
- New Mexico State Highway System; Interstate; US; State; Scenic
← NM 560	→ NM 564

State Road 562 (NM 562) is a 19.562-mile-long (31.482 km) state highway in the US state of New Mexico. NM 562's western terminus is at the end of state maintenance in Clapham, and the eastern terminus is at NM 402 south of Clayton.

== Major intersections ==
The entire route is in Union County.

Location	mi	km	Destinations	Notes
Clapham	0.000	0.000	End of state maintenance	Western terminus
	19.562	31.482	NM 402	Eastern terminus
1.000 mi = 1.609 km; 1.000 km = 0.621 mi
