= New Mexico State Road 411 =

Highway in New Mexico

State Road 411

Route information
- Maintained by NMDOT
- Length: 3.965 mi (6.381 km)

Major junctions
- Western end: NM 406 near Clayton
- Eastern end: CR A077 near Clayton

Location
- Country: United States
- State: New Mexico
- Counties: Union

Highway system
- New Mexico State Highway System; Interstate; US; State; Scenic
| ← NM 410 | → US 412 |

State Road 411 (NM 411) is a 3.965-mile-long (6.381 km) state highway in the US state of New Mexico. NM 411's western terminus is at NM 406 northeast of Clayton, and the eastern terminus is at County Route A077 northeast of Clayton.

== Major intersections ==
The entire route is in Union County.

| Location | mi | km | Destinations | Notes |
|---|---|---|---|---|
| | 0.000 | 0.000 | NM 406 | Western terminus |
| | 3.965 | 6.381 | CR A077 | Eastern terminus |
1.000 mi = 1.609 km; 1.000 km = 0.621 mi
