= Blue Hole (New Mexico) =

Sinkhole used for scubadiving in New Mexico, United States

Blue Hole New Mexico
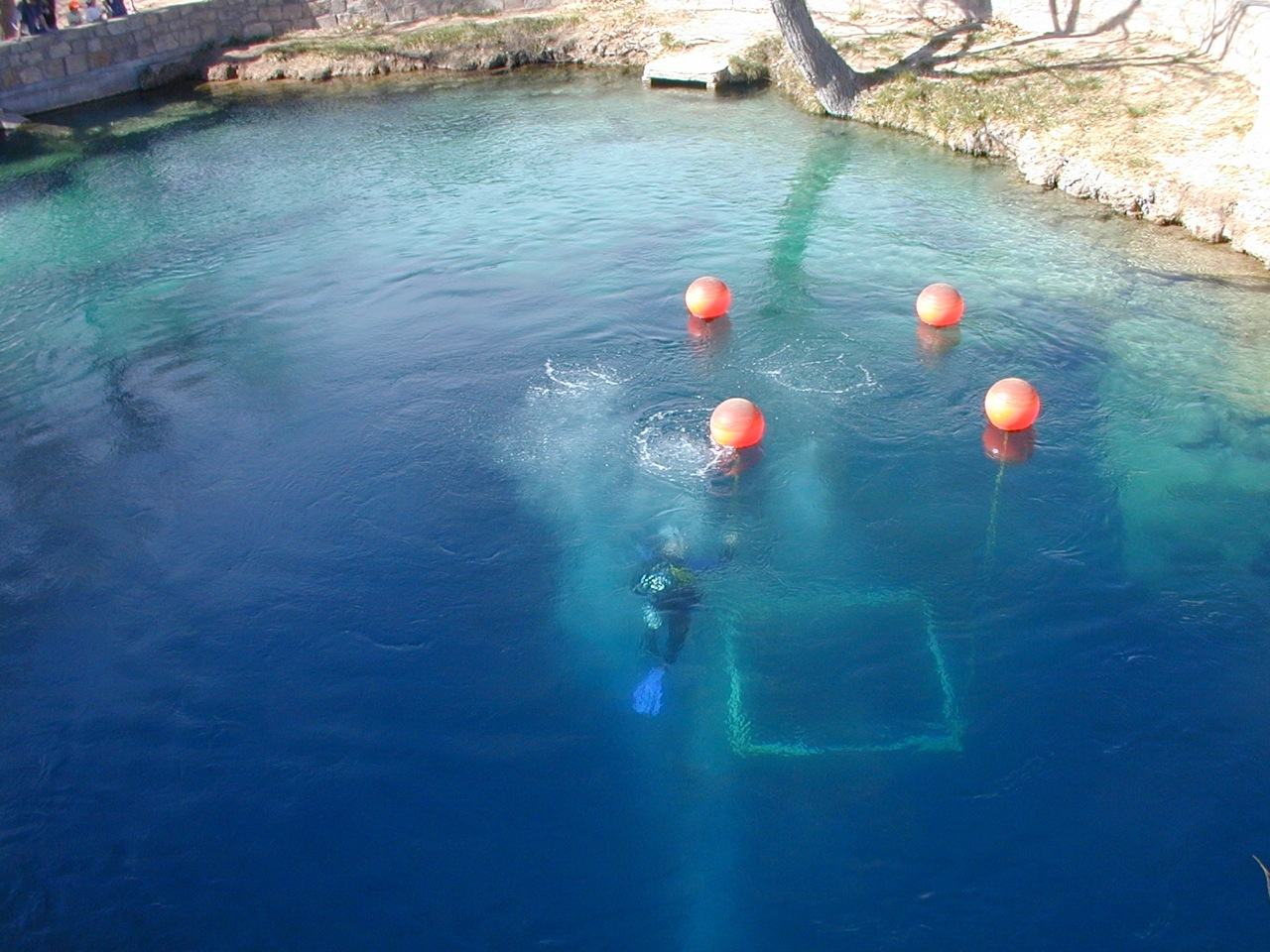

- Location within New Mexico Location within the United States
- Location: Guadalupe County, near Santa Rosa, New Mexico
- Coordinates: 34.940447°N 104.673239°W
- Basin countries: United States
- Max. width: 80 ft (24 m)
- Max. depth: >80 ft (24 m)
- Surface elevation: 4,600 ft (1,400 m)
- Frozen: never
- Islands: none

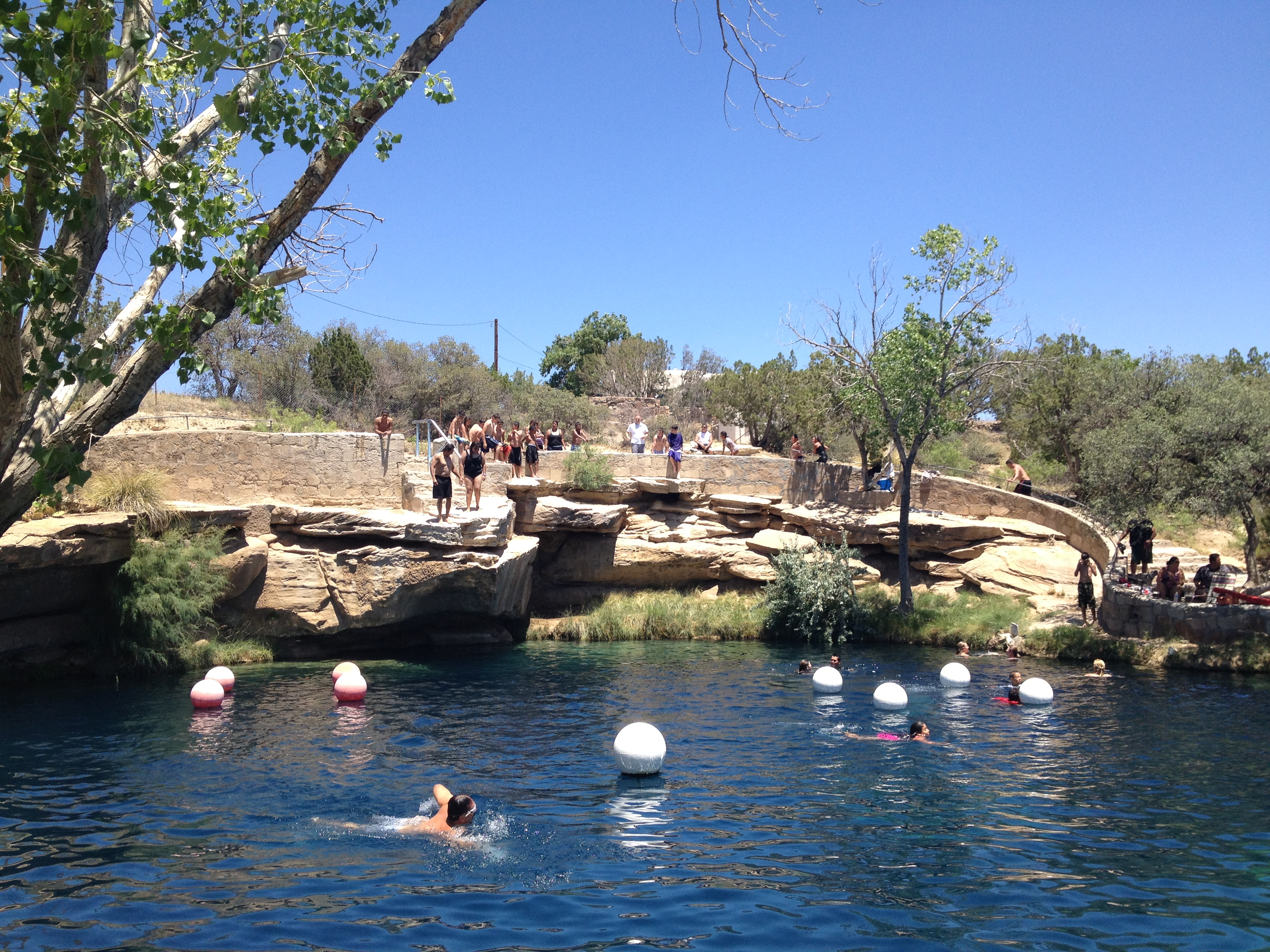
The Blue Hole is popular with divers and swimmers

The Blue Hole of Santa Rosa, or simply the Blue Hole, is a circular, bell-shaped pool or small lake located along Route 66 east of Santa Rosa, New Mexico that is a tourist attraction and swimming venue, and one of the most popular dive destinations in the US for scuba diving and training. The Blue Hole is an artesian well and cenote that was once used as a fish hatchery.

== Description ==
The Blue Hole is a clear blue body of water with a constant 62 °F (17 °C) temperature and constant inflow of 3,000 US gallons per minute (11 m^{3}/min; 2,500 imp gal/min), enough to cycle out the water every six hours. While the surface is 80 feet (24 m) in diameter, it expands to a diameter of 130 feet (40 m) at the bottom. The depth of the main pool is more than 80 feet (24 m) below the surface. The water in the pool originates deep underground below 200 feet (61 m) from the western edge of the Ogallala Aquifer.

The Blue Hole is an example of a natural artesian well, a type of well or spring fed by water under high pressure, and of a cenote, a collapsed cavern exposing groundwater beneath. The cavern was formed by the dissolution of the limestone bedrock by groundwater, carving caverns into the rock until the roof caved in.

At the bottom are large boulders, rubble, bones, masks, a crucifix, and other objects, and the entrance to a labyrinth of cave passages and rooms. The caves extend down to 194 feet (59 m), where they end in a cavern with a rubble-choked floor. The source water for the pool rushes up from the rubble in the floor of this cavern. Beneath this may be more passages. One local legend states that the passages may be connected to Carlsbad Caverns, one of the longest explored cave systems in the United States; however, the surface entrance to that cave system is located over 200 miles to the south.

Since 1976, the cave passages have been sealed off to the public by a metal grate to prevent access by inexperienced divers. It was only allowed to be unsealed for mapping between 2013 and 2016 by the ADM Exploration Foundation, an experienced cave exploration group. Hazards in the passages include frequent cave-ins, zero visibility due to silt, and extreme restrictions. Since Santa Rosa, New Mexico is at an elevation of 4,616 ft (1,407 m), it is necessary for divers to use high-altitude dive tables to compute the dive profile and decompression stops when diving in the Blue Hole.

Fauna present in the Blue Hole include goldfish, koi, carp, and crawdads. At the site are a visitors center, divers' locker rooms, a conference center, picnic tables, restrooms, a diving platform, and a short wall surrounding the pool to prevent surface runoff from fouling the clarity of the water. The pool is open for public use, including picnic, swimming, diving, and snorkeling.

== History ==
=== Early history ===
The Blue Hole was used by nomadic tribes as a reliable water source in the arid plains that surround the area. Cowboys on cattle drives across the Pecos River would also stop by the pool. When Route 66 came through the city in the 1920s, the original alignment brought it right past the property of the Blue Hole. The pool became a popular stop and tourist attraction for motorists on the new highway. In 1932, it became a hatchery for the National Fish Hatchery. Afterward it became the Blue Hole Recreation Area in the 1970s, then the Blue Hole Dive and Conference Center. In the current era of the Interstate, the pool continues to be a popular destination with both locals and divers from around the world.

=== Exploration ===
==== 1976 Recovery operation ====
During their searches for a missing diver in 1976, rescue divers with the New Mexico State Police crudely mapped part of the unexplored cave system and noted the discoveries within. They reported that the system reached a maximum depth of 225 feet (69 m); the actual depth may be closer to 190 feet (58 m) because their depth gauges were not adjusted for the altitude. At the entrance, they encountered a tight restriction that required removing equipment to access, and the exhaust from their SCUBA equipment dislodged rocks and caused cave-ins.

One room was reported at 17 feet (5.2 m) above the cave floor, but the ceiling collapsed as they occupied it; one of the divers was struck and nearly trapped by a falling boulder 3 feet (0.91 m) in diameter. When the divers accessed the second room, they noted formations such as shafts, cracks, and crevasses in the ceiling of the cavern. Another room they explored, dubbed the "Tee-Pee Room", had a ceiling that "looks as though thousands of ice cream cones were hanging invertly", as noted by diver Tom Hawkins. Hawkins also stated of the caves:

“When I went down to the third chamber, I was using a 100,000 candle-power flashlight[...] I could see easily in the chamber, but I couldn’t see to the other side — or the bottom — of the third chamber. Just imagine yourself in Carlsbad Cavern, but filled with water and without light.”

After the recovery operation, the city of Santa Rosa sealed the entrance with a 3 foot (0.91 m) diameter duct and grate "snorkel pipe" to prevent future access to the caverns. Moreover, the Army Corps of Engineers dumped two truckloads of rock and debris into the grate, apparently without the knowledge of city officials.

==== ADM expeditions ====
In 2013, the ADM Exploration Foundation and the city fielded an expedition to explore and map the cave system. With permission from the city, the expedition team removed the snorkel pipe to gain access to the first cavern. However, they were unaware of the debris dumped into the grate by the army, which prevented further exploration. Although the team was able to remove tons of rock and debris from the cavern floor, significantly increasing the water discharge rate, they were ultimately stopped by a boulder blocking the entrance to the second room.

After the expedition, the city installed another grate to prevent access to the exposed cave entrance. Over the next three years, the team worked with state police and APD divers to dredge and remove the remaining debris and open up the passages.

In March 2016, the ADM team returned for another expedition to map and explore the entirety of the cave system. The team explored down to a depth of 194 feet (59 m), where the water was found filtering up through tons of rock debris covering the cavern floor. Another fatality occurred during this expedition, outlined in the next section of this article. After the expedition, the team announced that all accessible areas of the system have been explored and mapped, and recommended to the city that the entrance remain closed to the public. Once again, the city installed a snorkel pipe to prevent further access. As of March 2021, no one has entered the caves since the expedition. On April 15, 2024, the snorkel pipe was removed and replaced with a grate.

=== Incidents ===
Three people are reported to have died there: two divers in 1976 and one more 40 years later.

On March 10, 1976, a team of student divers from Oklahoma were training in the pool. Mike Godard (22) and David Gregg (21) became separated from the group and failed to surface. State police rescue divers began a search of the unexplored caves and on the first day, they found David's body in the first chamber. Divers continued searching the passages for the next six weeks until Mike's body was found deep within the cave system. This incident prompted the city to seal the caves from the public.

On March 26, 2016, 43-year-old California diver Shane Thompson, a Navy veteran from the ADM Exploration Foundation with over 20 years of diving experience, including search and rescue and recovery operations, was exploring passageways when he became separated from his partner Mike Young after their tether broke. After taking a wrong turn in low visibility, Thompson became trapped in a dead end passage 160 feet (49 m) below the surface. By the time Young had located Thompson, he had already drowned. Young returned the next day to recover the body.

== See also ==
- List of sinkholes of the United States
- Bottomless Lakes State Park, similar water bodies in New Mexico
