= Harding County Courthouse =

- U.S. National Register of Historic Places
- NM State Register of Cultural Properties
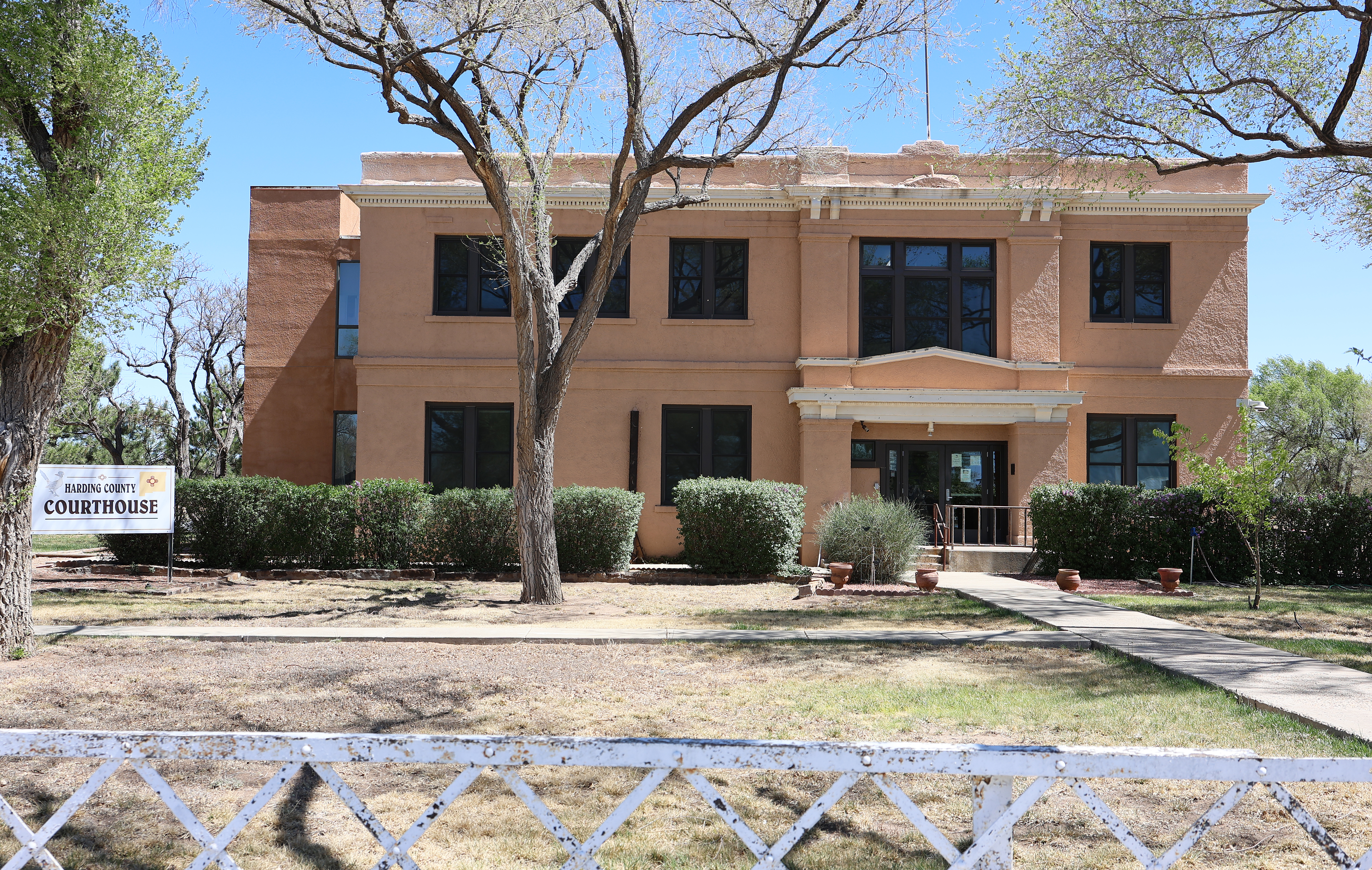
- The courthouse in 2026

- Location within New Mexico Location within the United States
- Location: Pine St., Mosquero, New Mexico
- Coordinates: 35°46′30″N 103°57′24″W
- Area: 1.5 acres (0.61 ha)
- Built: 1922
- Architectural style: Greek Revival, Modified Greek Revival
- MPS: County Courthouses of New Mexico TR
- NRHP reference No.: 87000895
- NMSRCP No.: 1268

Significant dates
- Added to NRHP: December 7, 1987
- Designated NMSRCP: May 9, 1986

The Harding County Courthouse, located on Pine St. in Mosquero, is the county courthouse in Harding County, New Mexico. The courthouse was completed in 1922; while the building had existed previously as a school, it was extensively remodeled to become the county courthouse. It is considered the grandest public building ever built in the county, the smallest in the state by population. The two-story building has a Classical Revival design with modest decoration; its main features include an entrance framed by piers and a cornice, pilasters above the entrance, and an egg and dart entablature. The courthouse grounds make up one of the only two dedicated public spaces in the county, along with the public square in Roy.

The courthouse was added to the National Register of Historic Places on December 7, 1987. It is one of 14 New Mexico county courthouses that were reviewed for their historical significance in 1987.

== See also ==
- National Register of Historic Places listings in Harding County, New Mexico
