= Lovington Fire Department Building =

- U.S. National Register of Historic Places
- NM State Register of Cultural Properties
- Location within New Mexico Location within the United States
- Location: 209 S Love St, Lovington, New Mexico
- Coordinates: 32°56′49″N 103°20′51″W
- Area: less than one acre
- Built: 1941-42
- Architectural style: International Style
- MPS: New Deal in New Mexico MPS
- NRHP reference No.: 08000574
- NMSRCP No.: 1926

Significant dates
- Added to NRHP: July 2, 2008
- Designated NMSRCP: April 4, 2008

The Lovington Fire Department Building, also known as the Lovington Fire Station, is a fire station in Lovington, New Mexico which was built in 1941. It was listed on the National Register of Historic Places in 2008.

It is a one-story building with two fire engine bays. It was built as a Works Progress Administration project during 1941-42 and served as Lovington's city hall, as well as its fire station.

It is optimistically described as having International Style architecture.

A new fire and police department building was constructed in 1984, just to the south; the historic building continued to serve by providing space for training and as a repair shop.
