= Pyburn House =

Historic house in New Mexico, United States

- U.S. National Register of Historic Places
- NM State Register of Cultural Properties
- Location within New Mexico Location within the United States
- Location: 203 Fourth St., Lovington, New Mexico
- Coordinates: 32°56′58″N 103°21′13″W
- Area: less than one acre
- Built: 1935
- Built by: John Wesley Pyburn
- Architectural style: Folk architecture
- NRHP reference No.: 95001429
- NMSRCP No.: 1593

Significant dates
- Added to NRHP: December 13, 1995
- Designated NMSRCP: July 7, 1994

Pyburn House, at 203 Fourth Street in Lovington, New Mexico, is an unusual building which was built during 1935–1937. It has also been known as Pyburn Apartments and as the Cornerstone Inn. It was listed on the National Register of Historic Places in 1995.

It was a work of John Wesley Pyburn in Folk architecture. Pyburn was superintendent of the schools in Lovington during 1930 to 1938, a period when population and the schools were growing rapidly. He was a mason and built the house during the summers of 1935, 1936, and 1937, intending for it to be home for his family plus also to serve as boarding house for teachers. Ethel Pyburn, his wife, managed the apartments serving boarders until her death in 1986 at the age of 96.
