= Mathew Elmore Sewalt House =

Historic house in New Mexico, United States

- U.S. National Register of Historic Places
- NM State Register of Cultural Properties
- Location within New Mexico Location within the United States
- Location: 121 E. Jefferson Ave., Lovington, New Mexico
- Coordinates: 32°57′12″N 103°20′52″W
- Area: less than one acre
- Built: 1909, 1916
- Built by: Mathew Elmore Sewalt
- Architectural style: Bungalow/craftsman
- NRHP reference No.: 06000634
- NMSRCP No.: 1883

Significant dates
- Added to NRHP: July 19, 2006
- Designated NMSRCP: October 14, 2005

The Mathew Elmore Sewalt House, on E. Jefferson Avenue in Lovington, New Mexico, was listed on the National Register of Historic Places in 2006. It was built in two phases in 1909 and 1916 and has also been known as the Sewalt House and as the Sewalt-Waits House.

It is a one-and-a-half-story adobe house with concrete stucco. It was started by Ham Bishop as an adobe pyramidal roof house. It was bought by "up-and-coming rancher" Mathew Sewalt in 1916, and he expanded it. It has Craftsman details including exposed rafter ends and a low shed-roof dormer.

Unfortunately Sewalt died young, in the 1918 influenza epidemic, but he had contributed "much to Lovington's improvement, including organizing corporations that founded the town's first bank and financed its first modem hotel." The house is significant as one of the better examples of a town home in Lovington "and reflects the shortlived prosperity of the town and the rancher who owned it."
