= Camp Nichols =

- U.S. National Register of Historic Places
- U.S. National Historic Landmark
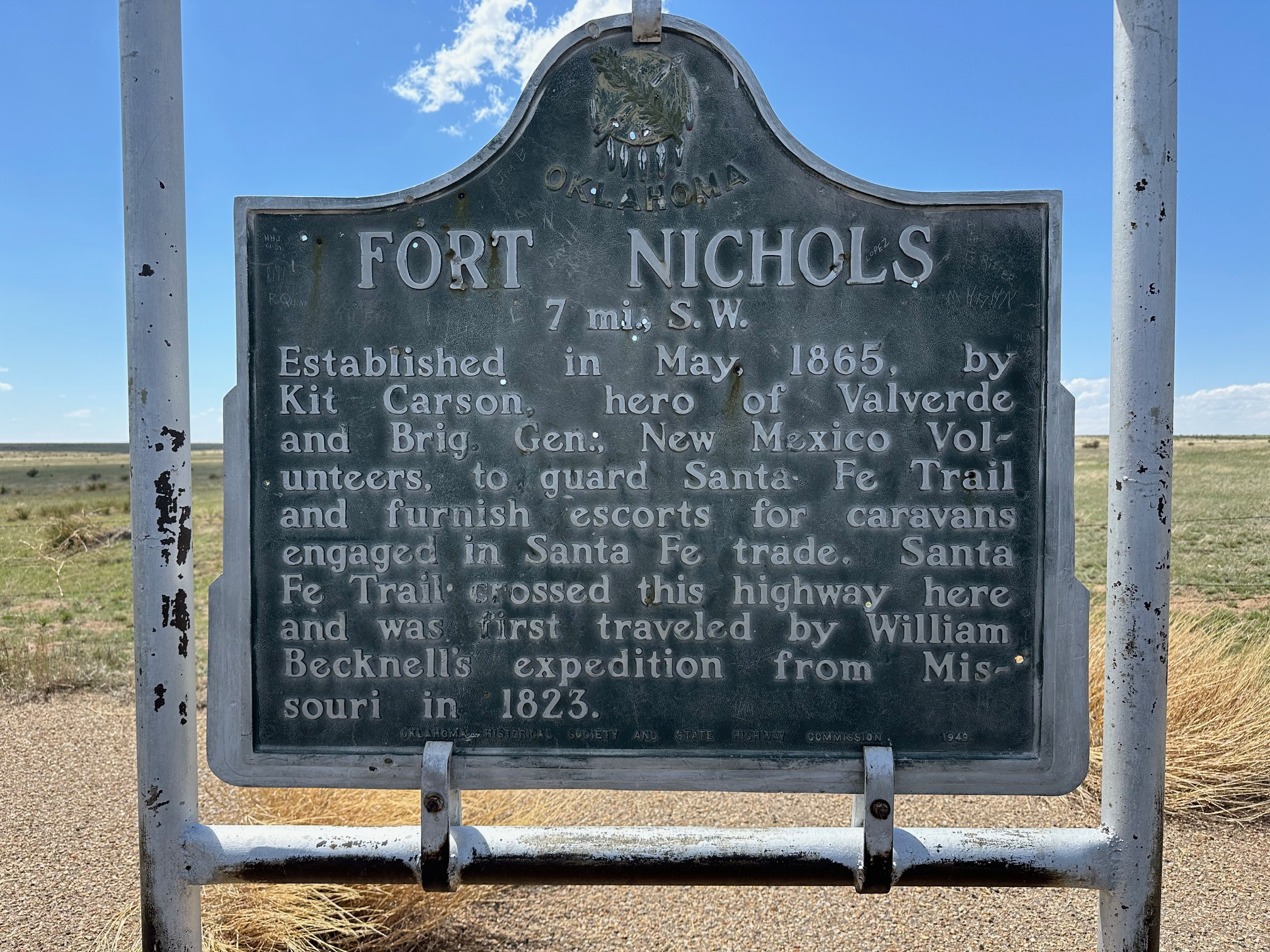
- Fort Nichols plaque, April 2024, off OK-325

- Location within Oklahoma Location within the United States
- Location: Cimarron County, Oklahoma, USA
- Nearest city: Wheeless, Oklahoma
- Coordinates: 36°45′14.22″N 102°55′35.15″W
- Area: 7 acres (2.8 ha)
- Built: 1865
- NRHP reference No.: 66000628

Significant dates
- Added to NRHP: October 15, 1966
- Designated NHL: May 23, 1963

Camp Nichols, also known as Fort Nichols or Camp Nichols Ranch, was a short-lived historic fortification located in present-day Cimarron County, Oklahoma, about 3 miles (4.8 km) northwest of the community of Wheeless, Oklahoma. It was built by New Mexico and California volunteers under the command of Col. Kit Carson to protect travelers on the most dangerous part of the Cimarron Cut-off of the Santa Fe Trail from raids by the Kiowa and Comanche Indians. Established in May 1865 and abandoned in September 1865, it was the only human-made structure along the Cimarron Cut-off while it was an active route. It is believed to have been named for Captain Charles P. Nichols of the First California Cavalry.

The site was about halfway (150 miles (240 km)) between Fort Union and the Cimarron Crossing of the Arkansas River. The camp was originally a stockaded fort, measuring 200 feet (61 m) by 200 feet (61 m). There were six stone buildings that served as officers' quarters, one building that was the quartermaster's store and an unknown number of stone walled tents housing the soldiers. The facility was surrounded by earth and stone breastworks. Only ruins remain; much of the stone has been removed by people wishing to use it in building other structures. The site is on private property and is not accessible to the public.

Cedar Spring, about 0.25 miles (0.4) km west of the fort, provided fresh water for the camp and for passing wagon trains. The remains of the Cimarron Cutoff are about 0.5 miles (0.80 km) south of the camp, and are said to be the most impressive remains of the entire trail.

The site was declared a National Historic Landmark in 1963 and subsequently listed on the National Register of Historic Places.

== See also ==
- List of National Historic Landmarks in Oklahoma
- National Register of Historic Places listings in Cimarron County, Oklahoma
