= Bueyeros, New Mexico =

- Unincorporated community
- Location within New Mexico Location within the United States
- Coordinates: 35°58′46″N 103°41′14″W
- Country: United States
- State: New Mexico
- County: Harding
- Elevation: 4,547 ft (1,386 m)
- Time zone: UTC-7 (Mountain (MST))
  - Summer (DST): UTC-6 (MDT)
- Area code: 505
- GNIS feature ID: 902189

Bueyeros is an unincorporated community in Harding County, New Mexico, United States. The community is located on New Mexico State Road 102, 20.5 miles (33.0 km) northeast of Mosquero. Its name comes from a Spanish word meaning "ox drivers".

The Bueyeros School, which is listed on the National Register of Historic Places, is located in Bueyeros.
