= Union County, New Mexico =

County in New Mexico, United States

- County
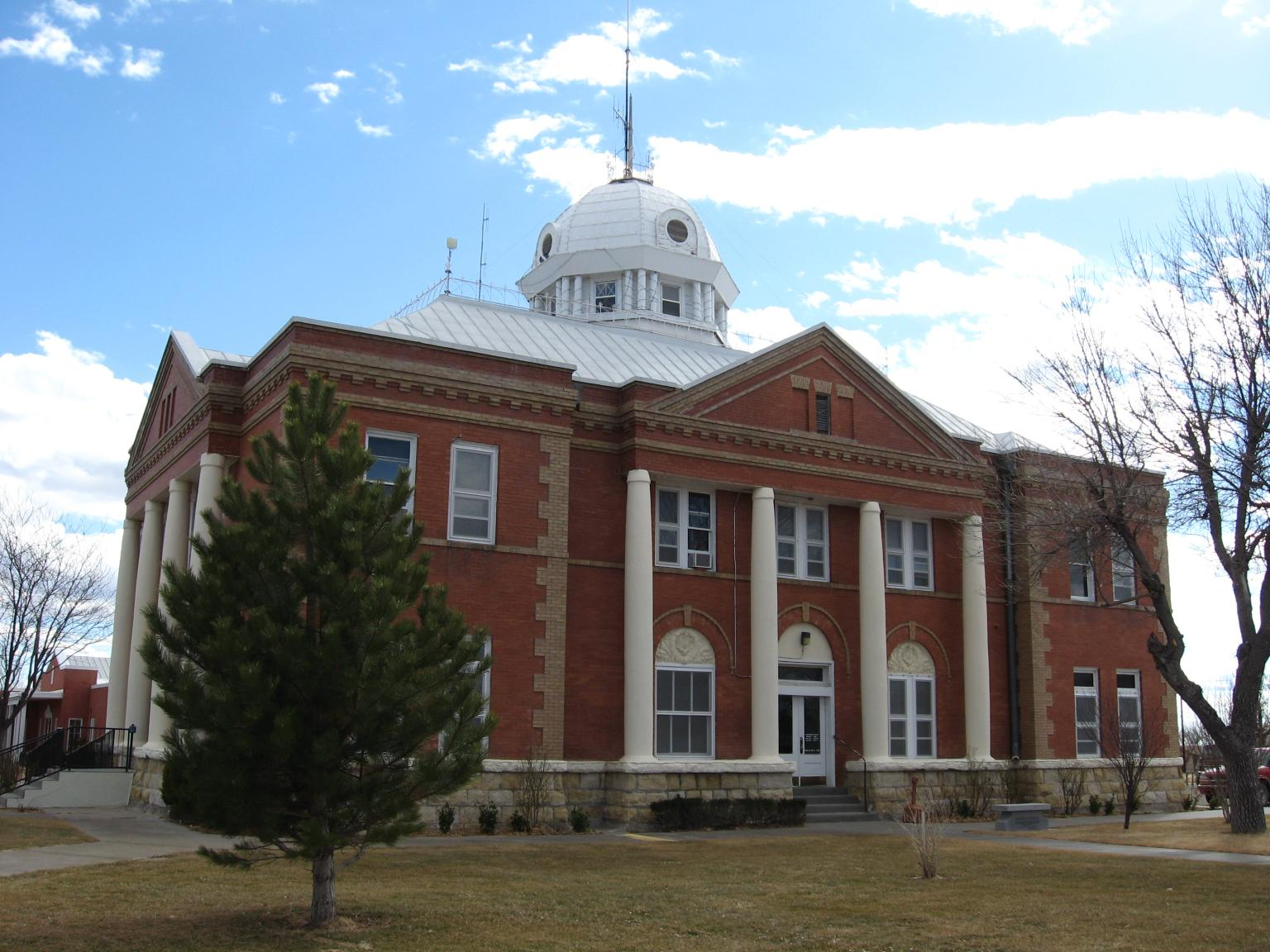
- Union County Courthouse in Clayton

- Location within the U.S. state of New Mexico
- Coordinates: 36°29′N 103°28′W
- Country: United States
- State: New Mexico
- Founded: January 1, 1894
- Seat: Clayton
- Largest town: Clayton

Area
  - Total: 3,831 sq mi (9,920 km^{2})
  - Land: 3,824 sq mi (9,900 km^{2})
  - Water: 7.1 sq mi (18 km^{2}) 0.2%

Population (2020)
  - Total: 4,079
  - Estimate (2025): 3,844 ▼
  - Density: 1.1/sq mi (0.42/km^{2})
- Time zone: UTC−7 (Mountain)
  - Summer (DST): UTC−6 (MDT)
- Congressional district: 3rd
- Website: unionnm.us

Union County (Spanish: Condado de la Unión) is the easternmost county in the U.S. state of New Mexico. As of the 2020 census, the population was 4,079, making it the fourth-least populous county in New Mexico. Its county seat is Clayton. The county was formed in 1894. Union County borders Colorado to the north, and Oklahoma and Texas to the east.

== History ==
Union County, was created by an act of the territorial legislation in 1893 and was officially recognized on January 1, 1894, when the first slate of elected county officials received their oaths of office. The county is named “Union” because the citizens were united in their desire for the creation of a new county out of three existing New Mexico counties. Union County was subsequently “carved up” by the creation of additional counties, Quay in 1903 and Harding in 1920. At one time, Union County had a population of over 20,000. There were a number of bustling communities such as Amistad, Hayden, Sedan, Pasamonte, Gladstone, Mt Dora, Grenville, Des Moines, Folsom, and Dedman (now known as Capulin).

== Geography ==
According to the U.S. Census Bureau, the county has a total area of 3,831 square miles (9,920 km^{2}), of which 3,824 square miles (9,900 km^{2}) is land and 7.1 square miles (18 km^{2}) (0.2%) is water.

=== Adjacent counties ===
- Las Animas County, Colorado (northwest)
- Baca County, Colorado (north)
- Cimarron County, Oklahoma (east/Central Time border)
- Dallam County, Texas (east/Central Time border)
- Hartley County, Texas (southeast/Central Time border)
- Quay County (south)
- Harding County (south)
- Colfax County (west)

Union County is one of the few counties in the U.S. to border counties from four different states. One of its neighbors is Cimarron County, Oklahoma, the only US county to border counties from five different states.

=== National protected areas ===
- Capulin Volcano National Monument
- Kiowa National Grassland (part)

== Demographics ==
Historical population
Census	Pop.	Note	%±
1900	4,528		—
1910	11,404		151.9%
1920	16,680		46.3%
1930	11,036		−33.8%
1940	9,095		−17.6%
1950	7,372		−18.9%
1960	6,068		−17.7%
1970	4,925		−18.8%
1980	4,725		−4.1%
1990	4,124		−12.7%
2000	4,174		1.2%
2010	4,549		9.0%
2020	4,079		−10.3%
2025 (est.)	3,844	▼	−5.8%
U.S. Decennial Census; 1790-1960 1900-1990; 1990-2000 2010

=== 2020 census ===
As of the 2020 census, the county had a population of 4,079, and the median age was 43.6 years. 20.1% of residents were under the age of 18, and 20.8% were 65 years of age or older. For every 100 females there were 123.1 males, and for every 100 females age 18 and over there were 126.1 males age 18 and over.

Union County, New Mexico – Racial and ethnic composition Note: the US Census treats Hispanic/Latino as an ethnic category. This table excludes Latinos from the racial categories and assigns them to a separate category. Hispanics/Latinos may be of any race.
Race / Ethnicity (NH = Non-Hispanic)	Pop 2000	Pop 2010	Pop 2020	% 2000	% 2010	% 2020
White alone (NH)	2,618	2,549	2,234	62.72%	56.03%	54.77%
Black or African American alone (NH)	0	74	65	0.00%	1.63%	1.59%
Native American or Alaska Native alone (NH)	11	50	57	0.26%	1.10%	1.40%
Asian alone (NH)	14	22	6	0.34%	0.48%	0.15%
Pacific Islander alone (NH)	5	1	4	0.12%	0.02%	0.10%
Other race alone (NH)	11	5	15	0.26%	0.11%	0.37%
Mixed race or Multiracial (NH)	50	43	102	1.20%	0.95%	2.50%
Hispanic or Latino (any race)	1,465	1,805	1,596	35.10%	39.68%	39.13%
Total	4,174	4,549	4,079	100.00%	100.00%	100.00%

The racial makeup of the county was 66.5% White, 1.6% Black or African American, 2.1% American Indian and Alaska Native, 0.2% Asian, 0.1% Native Hawaiian and Pacific Islander, 9.0% from some other race, and 20.5% from two or more races. Hispanic or Latino residents of any race comprised 39.1% of the population.

0.0% of residents lived in urban areas, while 100.0% lived in rural areas.

There were 1,552 households in the county, of which 27.1% had children under the age of 18 living with them and 26.4% had a female householder with no spouse or partner present. About 29.5% of all households were made up of individuals and 14.9% had someone living alone who was 65 years of age or older. There were 2,077 housing units, of which 25.3% were vacant. Among occupied housing units, 65.5% were owner-occupied and 34.5% were renter-occupied. The homeowner vacancy rate was 2.8% and the rental vacancy rate was 10.1%.

=== 2010 census ===
As of the 2010 census, there were 4,549 people, 1,695 households, and 1,073 families living in the county. The population density was 1.2 inhabitants per square mile (0.46/km^{2}). There were 2,305 housing units at an average density of 0.6 per square mile (0.23/km^{2}). The racial makeup of the county was 81.7% white, 2.0% American Indian, 1.8% black or African American, 0.5% Asian, 11.7% from other races, and 2.3% from two or more races. Those of Hispanic or Latino origin made up 39.7% of the population. In terms of ancestry, 13.6% were German, 10.3% were Irish, 7.4% were English, and 7.0% were American.

Of the 1,695 households, 28.8% had children under the age of 18 living with them, 48.8% were married couples living together, 10.1% had a female householder with no husband present, 36.7% were non-families, and 33.2% of all households were made up of individuals. The average household size was 2.29 and the average family size was 2.90. The median age was 40.9 years.

The median income for a household in the county was $39,975 and the median income for a family was $41,687. Males had a median income of $29,388 versus $23,333 for females. The per capita income for the county was $19,228. About 6.9% of families and 9.8% of the population were below the poverty line, including 10.5% of those under age 18 and 9.3% of those age 65 or over.

=== 2000 census ===
As of the 2000 census, there were 4,174 people, 1,733 households, and 1,176 families living in the county. The population density was 1.1 people per square mile (0.42 people/km^{2}). There were 2,225 housing units at an average density of 1 per square mile (0.39/km^{2}). The racial makeup of the county was 80.38% White, 0.96% Native American, 0.34% Asian, 0.12% Pacific Islander, 16.00% from other races, and 2.20% from two or more races. 35.10% of the population were Hispanic or Latino of any race.

There were 1,733 households, out of which 31.10% had children under the age of 18 living with them, 54.70% were married couples living together, 9.10% had a female householder with no husband present, and 32.10% were non-families. 30.00% of all households were made up of individuals, and 14.90% had someone living alone who was 65 years of age or older. The average household size was 2.40 and the average family size was 2.99.

In the county, the population was spread out, with 27.30% under the age of 18, 6.30% from 18 to 24, 24.60% from 25 to 44, 24.10% from 45 to 64, and 17.80% who were 65 years of age or older. The median age was 40 years. For every 100 females there were 97.00 males. For every 100 females age 18 and over, there were 96.30 males.

The median income for a household in the county was $28,080, and the median income for a family was $35,313. Males had a median income of $26,364 versus $18,711 for females. The per capita income for Union county was $14,700. About 14.20% of families and 18.10% of the population were below the poverty line, including 31.40% of those under age 18 and 8.30% of those age 65 or over.

== Communities ==
Area affected by 1930s Dust Bowl

=== Town ===
- Clayton (county seat)

=== Villages ===
- Des Moines
- Folsom
- Grenville

=== Census-designated place ===
- Capulin

=== Other communities ===
- Amistad
- Gladstone
- Hayden
- Mount Dora
- Sedan
- Seneca
- Sofia
- Stead

== Politics ==
Like all of Eastern New Mexico, Union County is heavily Republican. The county has not voted for a Democratic presidential candidate since 1948. Hillary Clinton in 2016 received the worst showing for a Democrat in the county's history – but this was partially due to a large migration towards third-party candidates such as New Mexico native and former governor Gary Johnson, who ran as a libertarian.

United States presidential election results for Union County, New Mexico
Year	Republican		Democratic		Third party(ies)	
Year	No.	%	No.	%	No.	%
1912	815	31.21%	1,119	42.86%	677	25.93%
1916	1,495	39.88%	1,996	53.24%	258	6.88%
1920	2,930	54.38%	2,273	42.19%	185	3.43%
1924	1,415	37.77%	1,735	46.32%	596	15.91%
1928	2,081	61.21%	1,306	38.41%	13	0.38%
1932	1,173	26.95%	3,117	71.61%	63	1.45%
1936	1,625	38.08%	2,605	61.05%	37	0.87%
1940	1,900	48.73%	1,987	50.96%	12	0.31%
1944	1,604	54.21%	1,350	45.62%	5	0.17%
1948	1,246	43.73%	1,590	55.81%	13	0.46%
1952	1,988	63.39%	1,142	36.42%	6	0.19%
1956	1,649	60.83%	1,061	39.14%	1	0.04%
1960	1,686	61.18%	1,068	38.75%	2	0.07%
1964	1,232	51.31%	1,159	48.27%	10	0.42%
1968	1,217	55.42%	678	30.87%	301	13.71%
1972	1,545	72.50%	496	23.28%	90	4.22%
1976	1,146	53.30%	975	45.35%	29	1.35%
1980	1,407	65.87%	675	31.60%	54	2.53%
1984	1,503	74.44%	488	24.17%	28	1.39%
1988	1,291	65.87%	638	32.55%	31	1.58%
1992	975	52.59%	519	27.99%	360	19.42%
1996	995	60.30%	519	31.45%	136	8.24%
2000	1,269	72.31%	452	25.75%	34	1.94%
2004	1,454	77.30%	411	21.85%	16	0.85%
2008	1,227	70.44%	492	28.24%	23	1.32%
2012	1,236	70.27%	472	26.83%	51	2.90%
2016	1,216	71.45%	320	18.80%	166	9.75%
2020	1,388	77.59%	383	21.41%	18	1.01%
2024	1,247	74.89%	378	22.70%	40	2.40%

== Transportation ==
=== Major highways ===
- US 56 / US 412
- US 64
- US 87
- NM 72
- NM 102
- NM 120
- NM 325
- NM 370
- NM 402
- NM 406
- NM 410
- NM 411
- NM 417
- NM 420
- NM 421
- NM 453
- NM 456
- NM 551
- NM 562

== See also ==
- Folsom Falls
- National Register of Historic Places listings in Union County, New Mexico
