= Laguna Plata Archeological District =

Historic district in New Mexico, United States

- U.S. National Register of Historic Places
- U.S. Historic district
- Nearest city: Hobbs, New Mexico
- Area: 3,360 acres (13.6 km^{2})
- NRHP reference No.: 89001209
- Added to NRHP: September 14, 1989

The Laguna Plata Archeological District is a 3,360 acres (13.6 km^{2}) historic district in Lea County, New Mexico, near Hobbs, New Mexico, which was listed on the National Register of Historic Places in 1989. It included 26 contributing sites.

Field investigation was conducted by archeologists in April 2010. It is a seasonal use camp site which had usage by native people in three periods: 200/400–1100 A.D., 1100–1300 A.D., and 1300–1450 A.D.
