= Lea Theater =

- U.S. National Register of Historic Places
- NM State Register of Cultural Properties
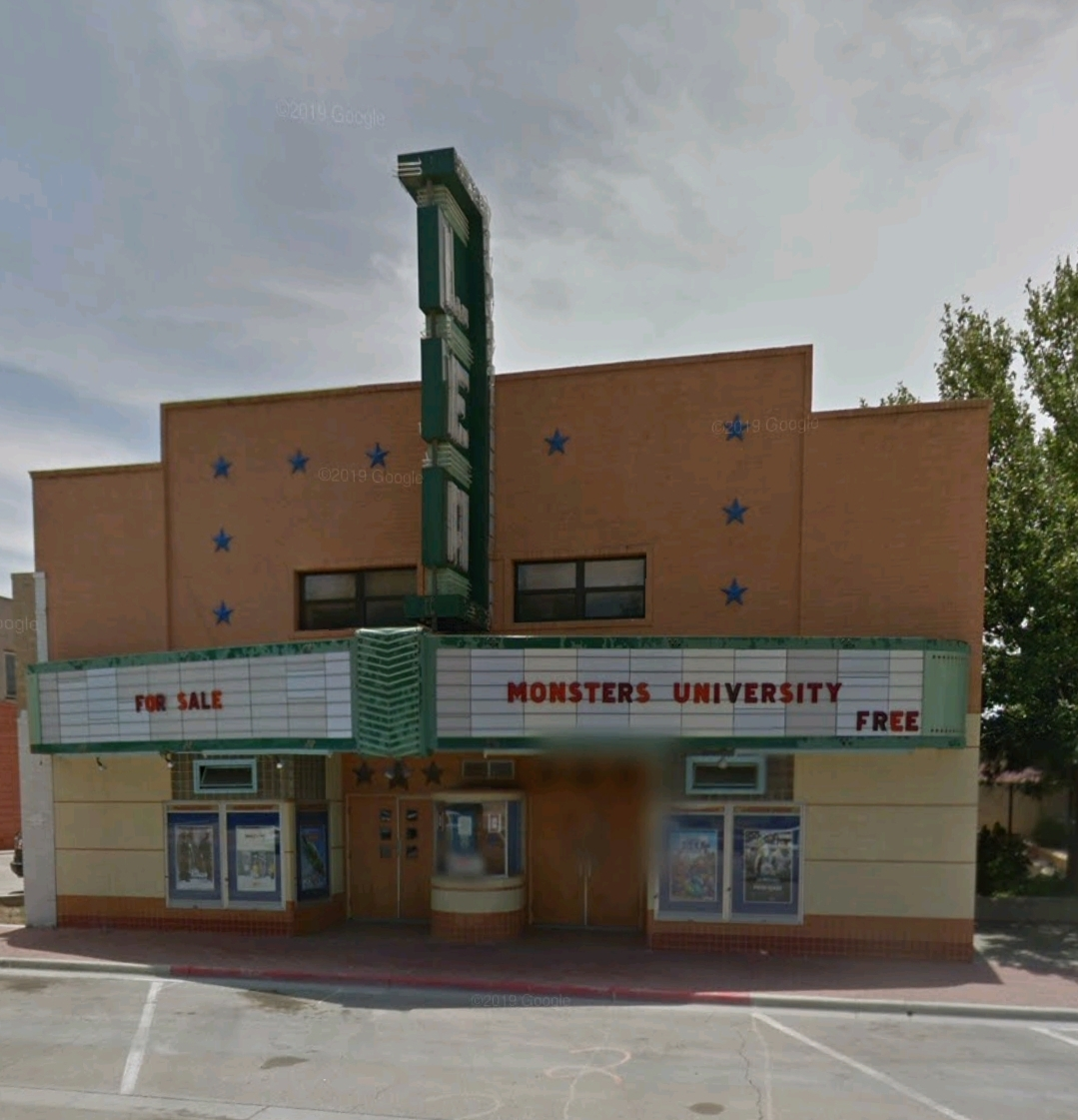

- Location within New Mexico Location within the United States
- Location: 106 E. Central St., Lovington, New Mexico
- Coordinates: 32°56′59″N 103°20′54″W
- Area: less than one acre
- Built: 1948
- Architectural style: Art Deco
- MPS: Movie Theaters in New Mexico MPS
- NRHP reference No.: 06001251
- NMSRCP No.: 1895

Significant dates
- Added to NRHP: January 17, 2007
- Designated NMSRCP: August 11, 2006

The Lea Theater, an Art Deco theater in Lovington, New Mexico, was built in 1948. It was listed on the National Register of Historic Places in 2007. Renovations to the historic theater began on January 27, 2020 with updates to the Lobby and Concession area.

It is a two-story building with a brick and ceramic tile facade and a triangular marquee overhanging the sidewalk. The theater is on the south side of Lea County's courthouse square.

Its 50 by 100 feet (15 m × 30 m) auditorium interior seats 400. The interior includes murals painted in the 1990s by local artist Albert Perea which show Plains Indians and cowboys.
