= Nara Visa, New Mexico =

- Unincorporated community
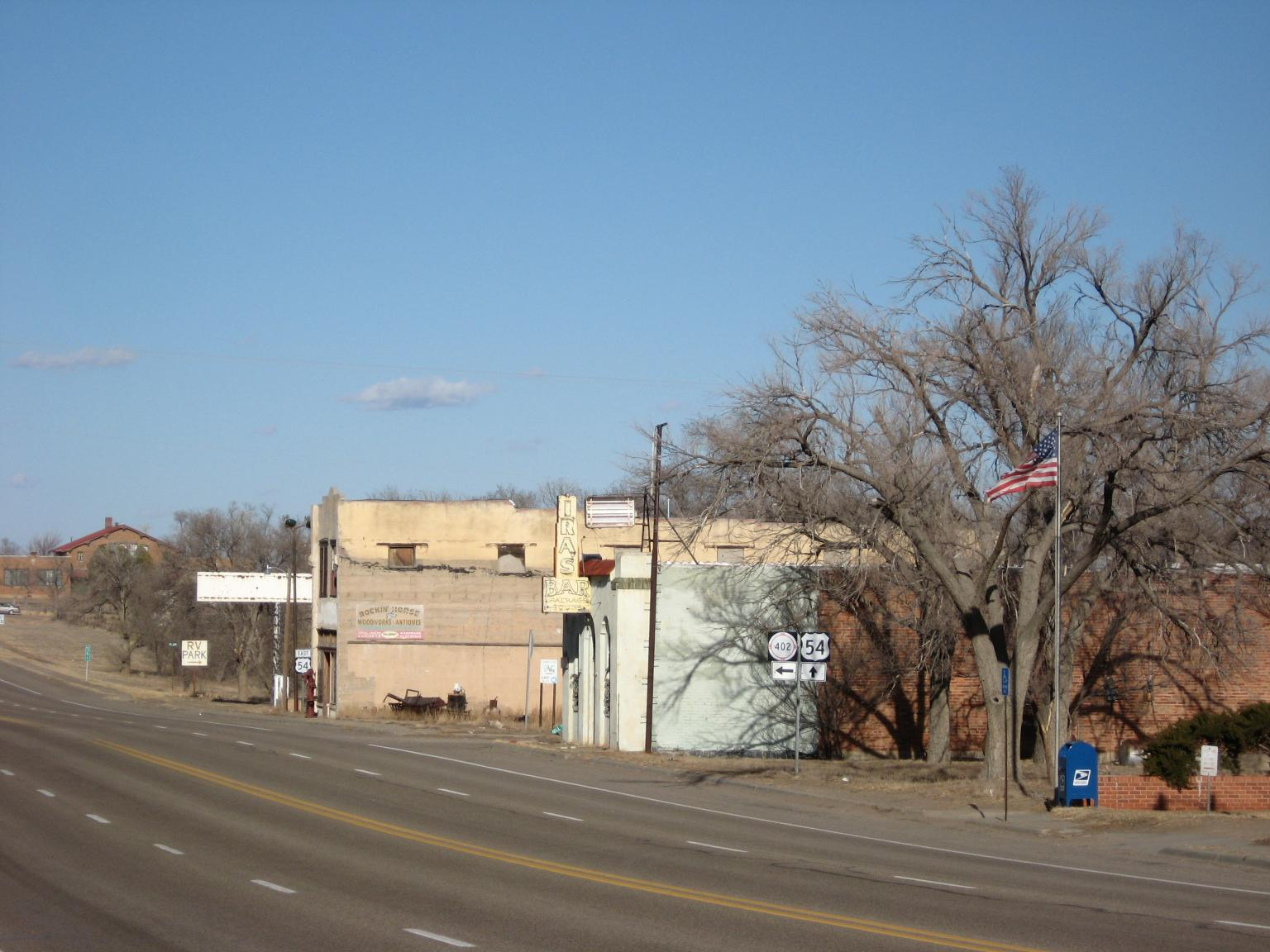
- Looking east along U.S. Route 54 in 2008

- Location within New Mexico Location within the United States
- Coordinates: 35°36′55″N 103°06′35″W
- Country: United States
- State: New Mexico
- County: Quay

Area
  - Total: 7.05 sq mi (18.27 km^{2})
  - Land: 7.05 sq mi (18.27 km^{2})
  - Water: 0 sq mi (0.00 km^{2})
- Elevation: 4,177 ft (1,273 m)

Population (2020)
  - Total: 51
  - Density: 7.2/sq mi (2.79/km^{2})
- Time zone: UTC-7 (MST)
  - Summer (DST): UTC-6 (MDT)
- ZIP Code: 88430
- Area code: 575
- FIPS code: 35-51140
- GNIS ID: 2584161

Nara Visa is an unincorporated community and census-designated place in Quay County, New Mexico, United States. It has the post office serving the ZIP code of 88430. The population was 51 as of the 2020 census.

== History ==
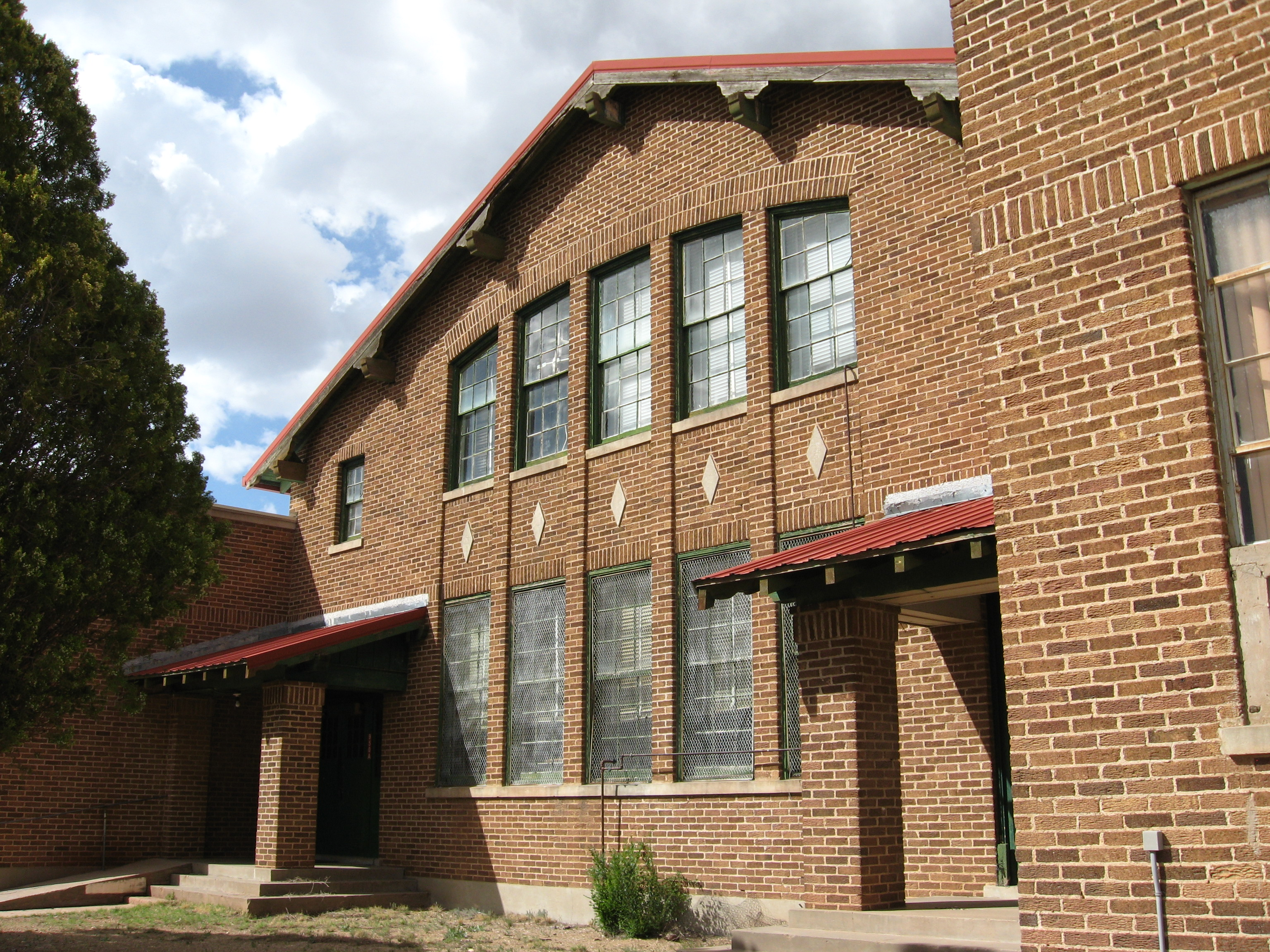
Nara Visa School, 2008

Nara Visa traces its beginnings to brothers Sim and Fred McFarland of La Veta, Colorado. The brothers originally came to New Mexico to work on their uncle's cattle ranch. When word came that the Rock Island Railroad would be building a track through the area, the McFarlands moved to a location near the proposed route. The community was first known as Narvaez, named after the Narvaez family, who lived in the area in the 1880s. English-speaking settlers changed the name into its current name Nara Visa.

Henry F. King came to the site in November 1901 to be the first section foreman, when the town was founded. At that time, there were no structures aside from the depot. He and his wife lived in a boxcar where they boarded trainmen, section men, and occasionally cowboys. In January 1902, the section house was constructed. Soon two small stores were built.

The community's first school was constructed in 1906. By 1910, there were a total of four active churches. In 1919, Nara Visa had eight saloons, at least three dance halls, drugs stores, general merchandise stores, a barber shop, butcher shops, millinery shops, auto suppliers, hotels, garages, and a bank.

In 1921, the Nara Visa School was constructed. It closed and currently is a community center.

== Demographics ==
Historical population
Census	Pop.	Note	%±
2020	51		—
U.S. Decennial Census

== Transportation ==
U.S. Route 54 passes through this community. NM 402 ends at Nara Visa.

The Union Pacific Railroad passes through Nara Visa, but there are no sidings.

== See also ==
- National Register of Historic Places listings in New Mexico
