= Union County Courthouse (New Mexico) =

- U.S. National Register of Historic Places
- NM State Register of Cultural Properties
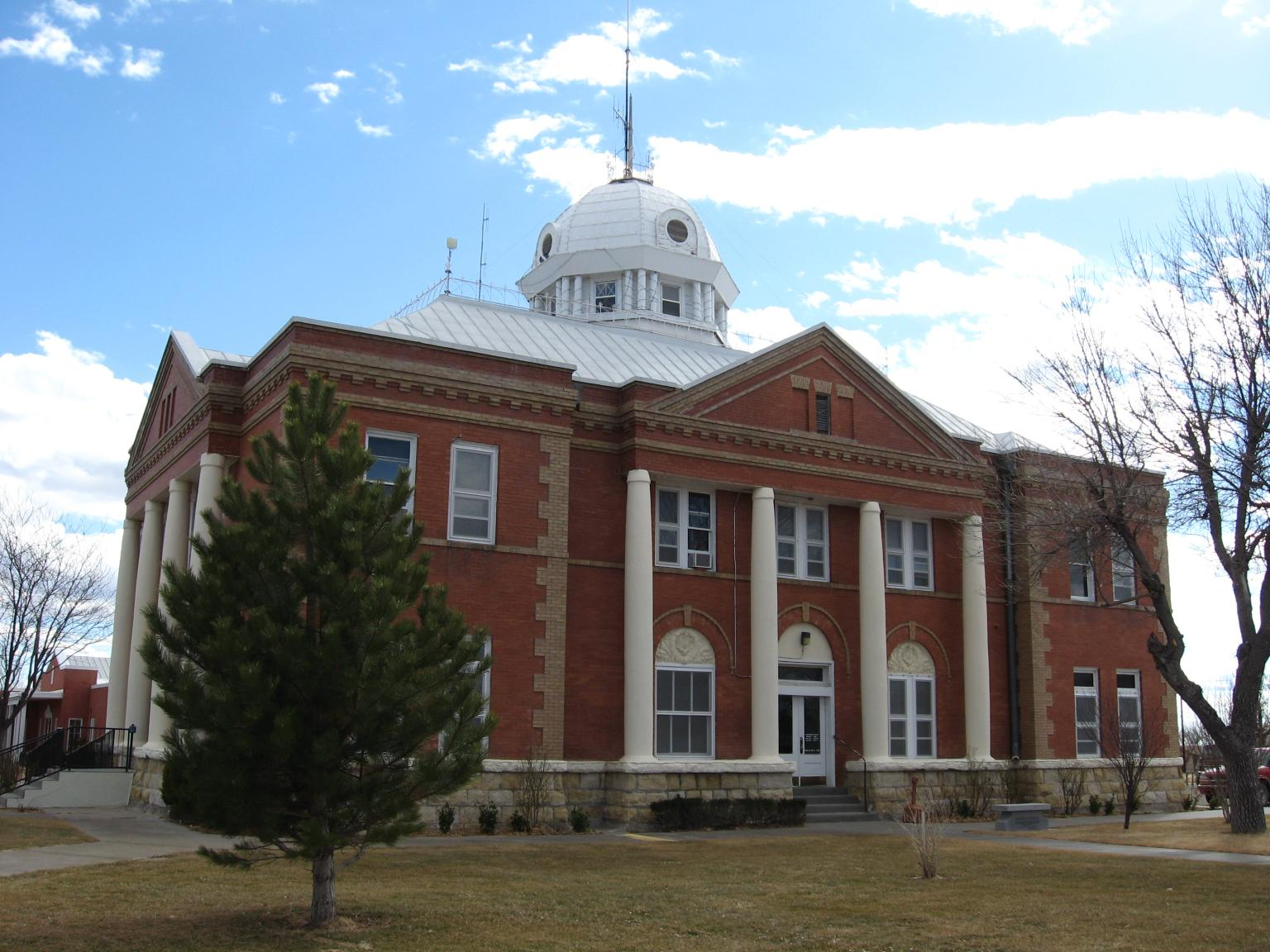
- Photo in 2008

- Location within New Mexico
- Location: Court St., Clayton, New Mexico
- Coordinates: 36°26′58″N 103°11′13″W
- Area: 3 acres (1.2 ha)
- Built: 1909
- Built by: Wooten & Bundy
- Architect: D.P. Kaufman & Son
- Architectural style: World's Fair Classic Style
- MPS: County Courthouses of New Mexico TR
- NRHP reference No.: 87000891
- NMSRCP No.: 408

Significant dates
- Added to NRHP: December 7, 1987
- Designated NMSRCP: August 22, 1975

The Union County Courthouse on Court St. in Clayton, New Mexico is a historic building built in 1909. It has been described as having World's Fair Classic Style architecture. It was listed on the National Register of Historic Places in 1987.

The courthouse was one of 14 studied in a 1987 review of historic courthouses in New Mexico.

== See also ==
- National Register of Historic Places listings in Union County, New Mexico
