= Sedan, New Mexico =

Unincorporated community in New Mexico, United States

Sedan
- Unincorporated community
- Location within the state of New Mexico Sedan (the United States)
- Coordinates: 36°08′40″N 103°07′50″W
- Country: United States
- State: New Mexico
- County: Union
- Elevation: 4,590 ft (1,400 m)
- Time zone: UTC-07:00 (MST)
  - Summer (DST): UTC-06:00 (MDT)
- ZIP codes: 88436
- Area code: 575
- GNIS feature ID: 910917

Sedan is an unincorporated community located in Union County, New Mexico, United States. The community is located on New Mexico State Road 421, 21.4 miles (34.4 km) south of Clayton. Sedan has a post office with ZIP code 88436.

The community was named after Sedan, Kansas, the native home of a large share of the first settlers.
