= Bottomless Lakes State Park =

State park in New Mexico, United States

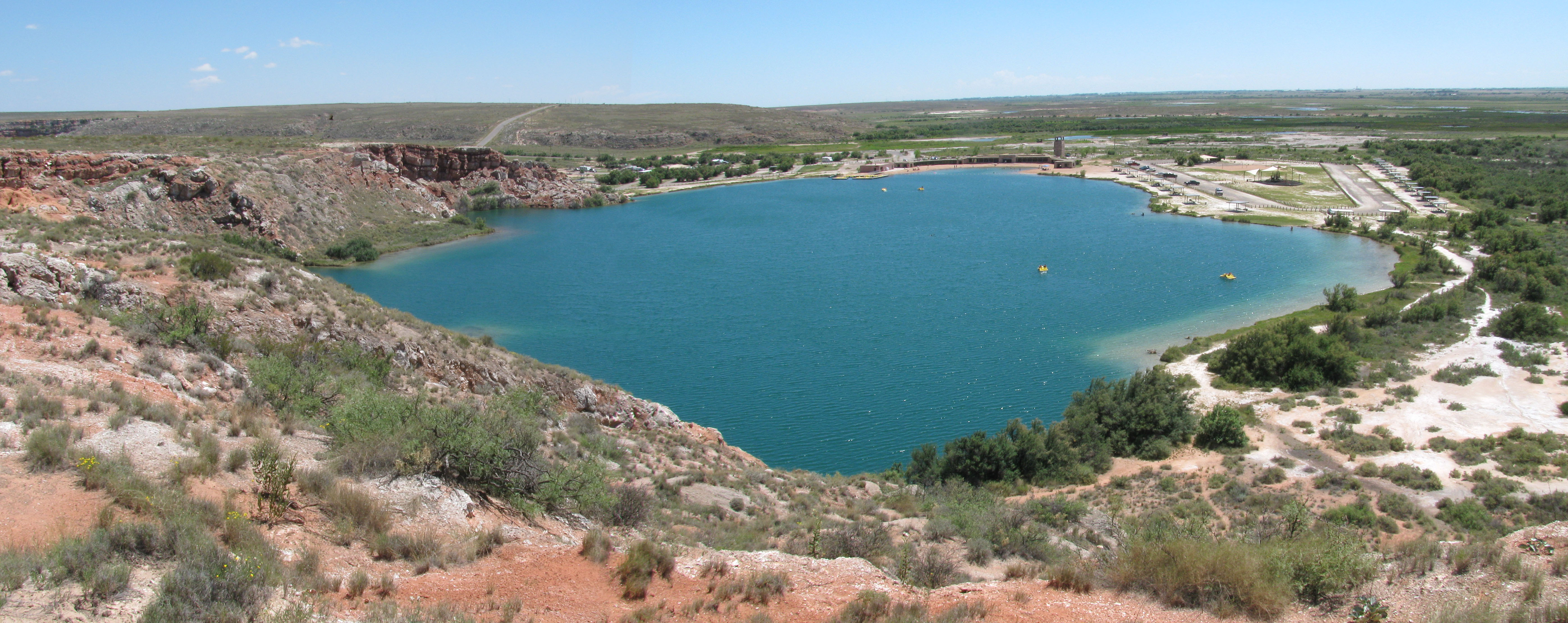
- View of Lea Lake from the overlook above the lake

- Location within New Mexico
- Interactive map of Bottomless Lakes State Park
- Location: Chaves County, New Mexico, United States
- Coordinates: 33°20′17″N 104°20′04″W
- Area: 1,400 acres (570 ha)
- Elevation: 3,617 ft (1,102 m)
- Established: 1933
- Administrator: New Mexico State Parks Division
- Website: Official website

Bottomless Lakes State Park is a state park in New Mexico, located along the Pecos River about 15 miles (24 km) southeast of Roswell. Established in 1933, it was the first state park in New Mexico. It takes its name from nine small, deep lakes located along the eastern escarpment of the Pecos River valley.

== Lakes ==
The lakes are not fed by streams, and the evaporation rate in the hot desert climate exceeds the rate at which rainwater refills them. The lakes are fed by underground water percolating through the rocks and into the lakes. The high evaporation rate produces brackish water in the lakes.

Seven of the lakes are protected, although in recent years the lakes have been contaminated by trash that has been thrown into the lakes by careless visitors. The southernmost lake, Dimmitt Lake, is not a part of the state park and is owned by the Fin and Feather Club, a local hunting and fishing club.

Most of the nine lakes are almost completely surrounded by cliffs, with the notable exceptions being Lea Lake and Lazy Lagoon. Lea Lake has a large, sandy shoreline on the western side and tall cliffs on the eastern side. The cliffs around Lazy Lagoon have been eroded away by the Pecos River, and the lake sits in a former channel of the river.

Lake	Maximum depth	Surface area	Notes
Lazy Lagoon	90 feet (27 m)	26.1 acres (10.6 ha)	Largest by area
Cottonwood Lake	27.5 feet (8.4 m)	0.52 acres (0.21 ha)	
Mirror Lake (north)	32.8 feet (10.0 m)	3 acres (1.2 ha)	
Mirror Lake (south)	43.3 feet (13.2 m)	0.44 acres (0.18 ha)	
Devil's Inkwell	28.2 feet (8.6 m)	0.36 acres (0.15 ha)	Smallest; dark algae color
Figure Eight Lake (north)	37 feet (11 m)	1.46 acres (0.59 ha)	
Figure Eight Lake (south)	22 feet (6.7 m)	0.76 acres (0.31 ha)	
Pasture Lake	18 feet (5.5 m)	0.76 acres (0.31 ha)	Shallowest
Lost Lake	—	0.1 acres (0.040 ha)	"less than 1 acre (0.40 ha)"
Lea Lake	90 feet (27 m)	15 acres (6.1 ha)	Only lake allowing swimming. Daily spring flow of about 2,500,000 US gallons (2,100,000 imp gal; 9,500 m^{3}).
Dimmitt Lake	—	10 acres (4.0 ha)	Private lake made up of two basins covering about 10 acres (4.0 ha).

Lazy Lagoon is the largest of the lakes, with a surface area of approximately 26.1 acres (10.6 ha). Although it is a single lake, it is made up of three separate sinkholes. The surface of the Lazy Lagoon is nearly level with the surrounding salt flats, which makes it look very shallow. The deepest of its three sinkholes is 90 feet (27 m) deep.

Lea Lake is the only lake in which swimming is allowed. It has a beach and concession area that is popular in the summer. Devil's Inkwell is the smallest lake with a surface area of 0.36 acres (0.15 ha). Its name stems from the water's dark color, caused by the steep sides of the cenote and algae growth within the lake. In pure geologic terms, Figure Eight Lake is two lakes separated by a thin strip of land. When the water is very high the strip of land is covered, and the two nearly circular lakes join and take the shape of a figure eight. Irrigation in the Pecos valley has lowered the water table, so the two lakes of Figure Eight lake rarely join to form a single lake anymore.

=== Geology ===
The Bottomless Lakes occur at the base of an escarpment formed by the gypsum-rich Seven Rivers Formation. Ground water in the underlying San Andres artisian aquifer rises along faults at the escarpment and dissolves the gypsum thereby creating sinkholes or cenotes.

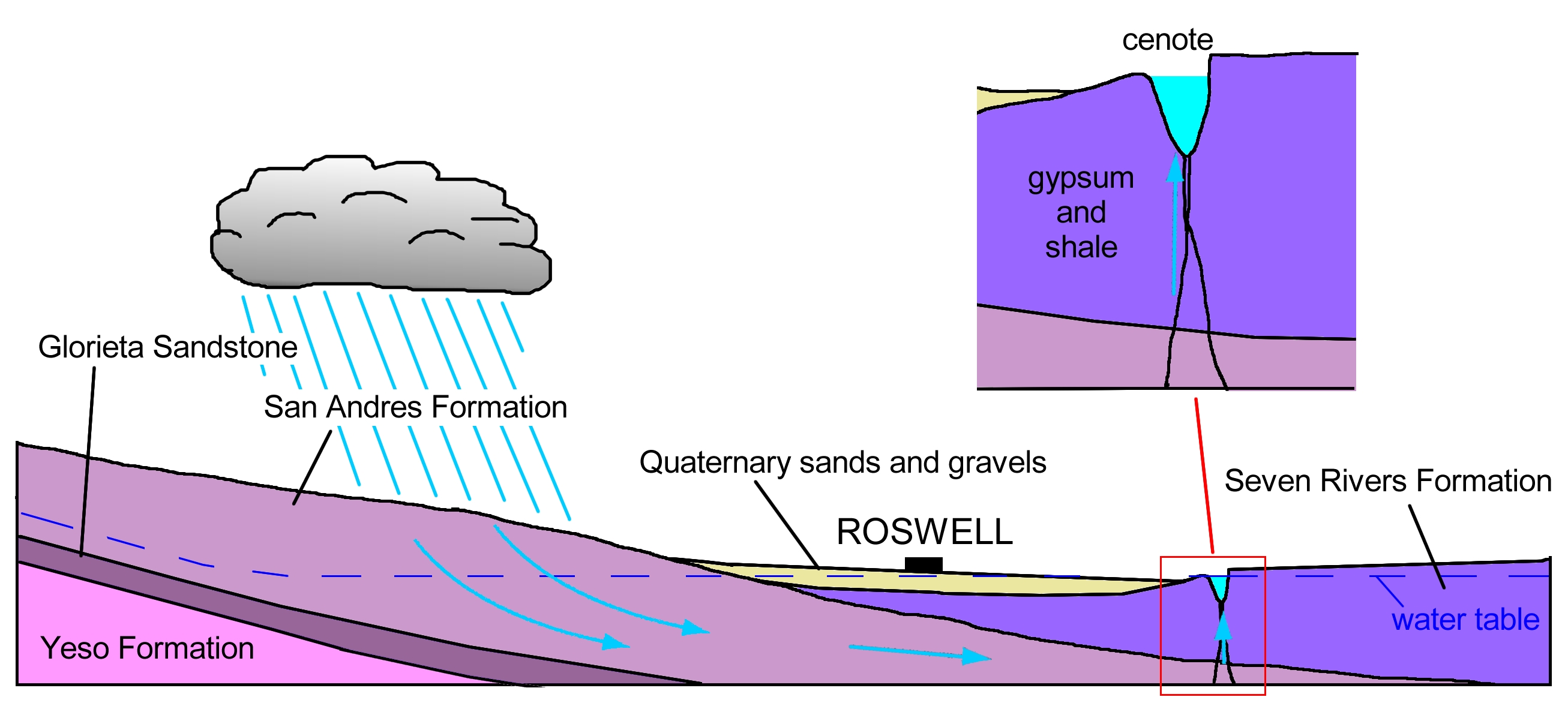
Simplified model of how the water from the San Andres aquifer rises along faults to dissolve the gypsum of the Seven Rivers Formation producing the cenotes or sinkholes.

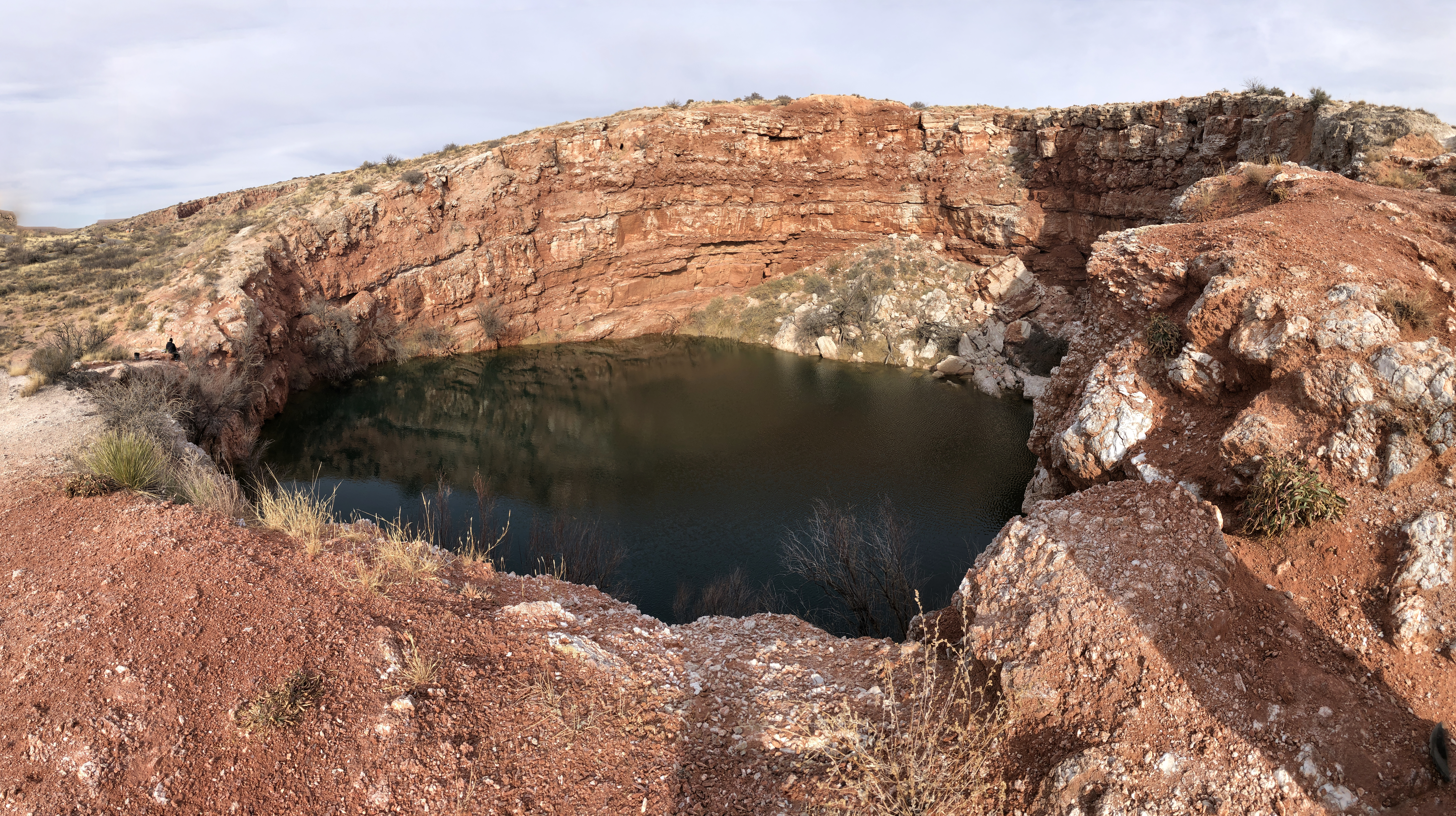
Devil's Inkwell cenote

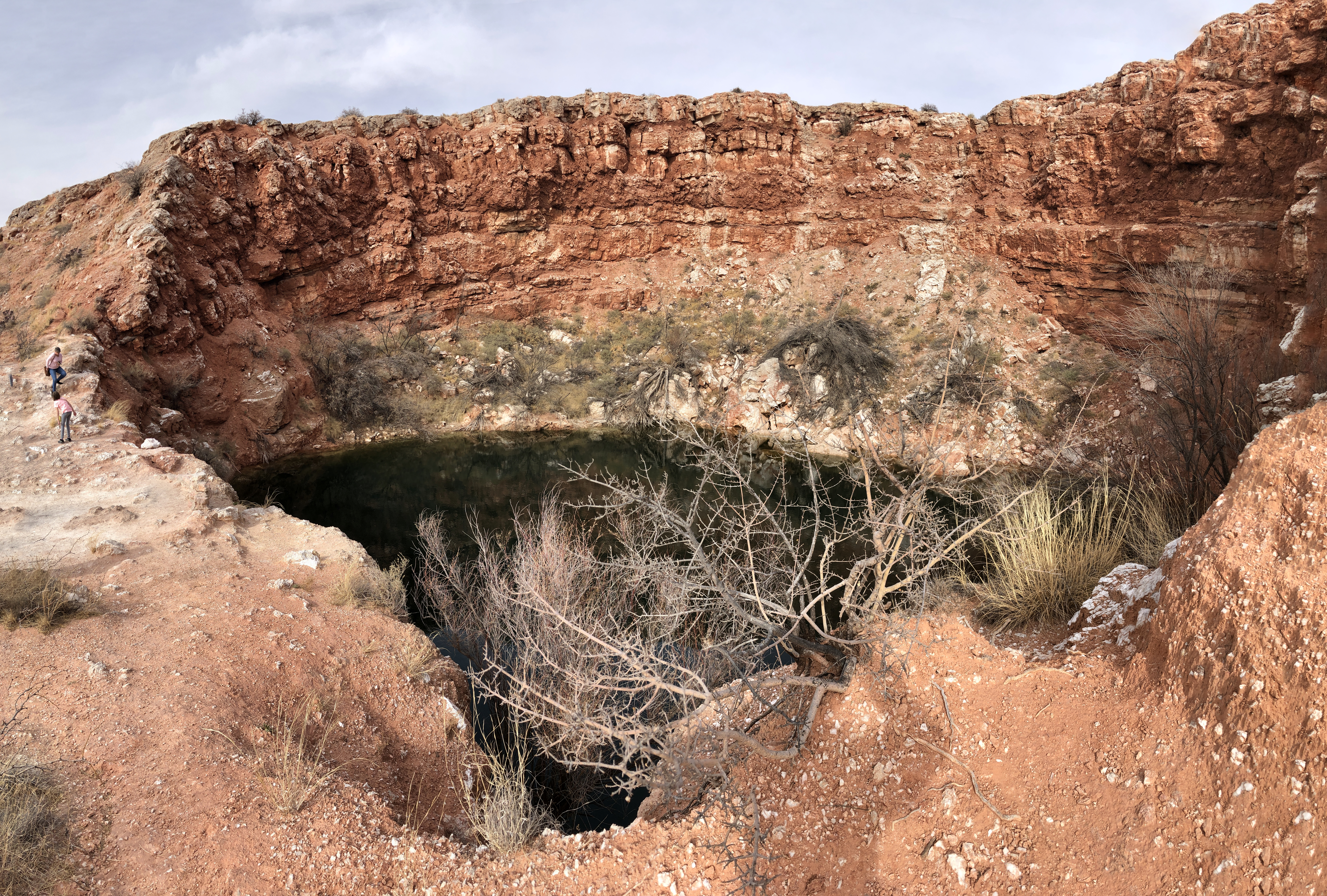
Cottonwood Lake cenote

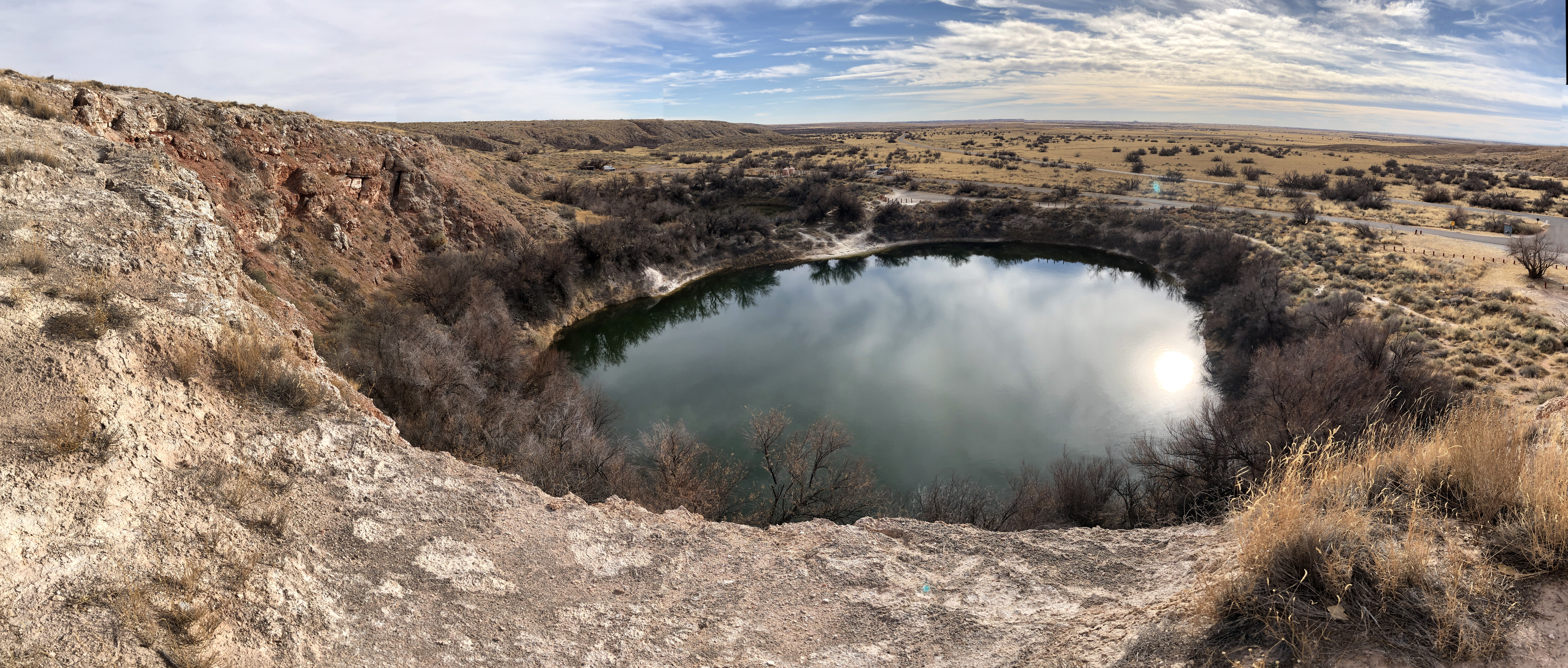
Figure Eight cenote

== Wildlife ==
Four endangered species can be found in the park—the Pecos pupfish, the Rainwater killifish, the cricket frog, and the Eastern Barking Frog. In the winter, Devil's Inkwell and Cottonwood Lake are both stocked with Rainbow Trout. Additional species include Cougar, Gray fox, Coyote, Striped skunk, Collared peccary, North American porcupine, Desert cottontail, Black-tailed jackrabbit, Bobcat, Mule deer, Badger, Raccoon, Rattlesnake, Pituophis catenifer, Teiidae, and occasionally Pronghorn. Bird species include Roadrunner, Common raven, Chihuahuan raven, Swainson's hawk, Northern harrier, Great horned owl, American white pelican, Mallard, Mexican duck, teal, Ash-throated flycatcher, Vermilion flycatcher, Great blue heron, Black-crowned night heron, Plover, Sandhill crane, and Wilson's phalarope.

== See also ==
- List of sinkholes of the United States
- The Blue Hole, a similar waterbody in New Mexico
