= New Mexico State Road 402 =

State highway in New Mexico, United States

State Road 402

Route information
- Maintained by NMDOT
- Length: 62.852 mi (101.150 km)

Major junctions
- South end: US 54 in Nara Visa
- NM 102 near Sedan
- North end: US 56 in Clayton

Location
- Country: United States
- State: New Mexico
- Counties: Quay, Union

Highway system
- New Mexico State Highway System; Interstate; US; State; Scenic
← NM 401	→ NM 403

State Road 402 (NM 402) is a 62.9-mile-long (101.2 km) state highway in the US state of New Mexico. NM 402's southern terminus is at U.S. Route 54 (US 54) in Nara Visa, and the northern terminus is at US 56 in Clayton.

== Major intersections ==
County	Location	mi	km	Destinations	Notes
Quay	Nara Visa	0.000	0.000	US 54	Southern terminus
Union		13.600	21.887	NM 417 east	Western terminus of NM 417
Union		19.400	31.221	NM 420 west	Eastern terminus of NM 420
Union		31.100	50.051	NM 102 west	Eastern terminus of NM 102
Union		41.568	66.897	NM 421 east	Western terminus of NM 421
Union		50.610	81.449	NM 562 west	Eastern terminus of NM 562
Union	Clayton	62.852	101.150	US 56	Northern terminus
1.000 mi = 1.609 km; 1.000 km = 0.621 mi
