= New Mexico State Road 102 =

State highway in New Mexico, United States

State Road 102

Route information
- Maintained by NMDOT
- Length: 46.318 mi (74.542 km)

Major junctions
- West end: NM 39 near Mosquero
- NM 420 near Mosquero
- East end: NM 402 near Amistad

Location
- Country: United States
- State: New Mexico
- Counties: Harding, Union

Highway system
- New Mexico State Highway System; Interstate; US; State; Scenic
← NM 101	→ NM 103

State Road 102 (NM 102) is a state highway in the US state of New Mexico. Its total length is approximately 46.3 miles (74.5 km). NM 102's western terminus is at NM 39 east-southeast of Mosquero, and the eastern terminus is north of Amistad at NM 402.

== History ==
New Mexico State Road 102 originally went between the current NM 402 (then NM 18) and Sedan in the 1940s. In the following decade, the road was extended southward over old NM 57 and old NM 171, overlapping then-NM 18, then westward through Bueyeros and eastward to the state line meeting up with Texas's SH 102. In 1988 during the New Mexico highway system renumbering, NM 102 took over old NM-65 (which is now NM 420) and the former portion of the route from NM 402 to the Texas state line became NM 421.

== Major intersections ==
County	Location	mi	km	Destinations	Notes
Harding		0.000	0.000	NM 39	Western terminus
Harding		8.283	13.330	NM 420 east	Western terminus of NM 420
Union		46.318	74.542	NM 402	Eastern terminus
1.000 mi = 1.609 km; 1.000 km = 0.621 mi
