= Seneca, New Mexico =

Unincorporated community in New Mexico, United States

- Unincorporated community
- Location within New Mexico
- Coordinates: 36°37′42″N 103°07′36″W
- Country: United States
- State: New Mexico
- County: Union
- Elevation: 4,990 ft (1,520 m)
- Time zone: UTC-7 (Mountain (MST))
  - Summer (DST): UTC-6 (MDT)
- Area code: 575
- GNIS feature ID: 910940

Seneca is an unincorporated community in Union County, New Mexico, United States. Seneca is located on New Mexico State Road 406, 12.6 miles (20.3 km) north-northeast of Clayton. Originally known as Cienaga, the name was corrupted by Anglophone settlers after the Civil War. The first postmaster was Flora Blackwell.
