= New Mexico State Road 406 =

State highway in Union County, New Mexico, United States

State Road 406
- NM 406 highlighted in red

Route information
- Maintained by NMDOT
- Length: 35.145 mi (56.560 km)

Major junctions
- South end: US 56 / US 64 / US 412 near Clayton
- NM 411; NM 410 near Moses
- North end: NM 456 west of Kenton, OK

Location
- Country: United States
- State: New Mexico
- Counties: Union

Highway system
- New Mexico State Highway System; Interstate; US; State; Scenic
← NM 404	→ NM 408

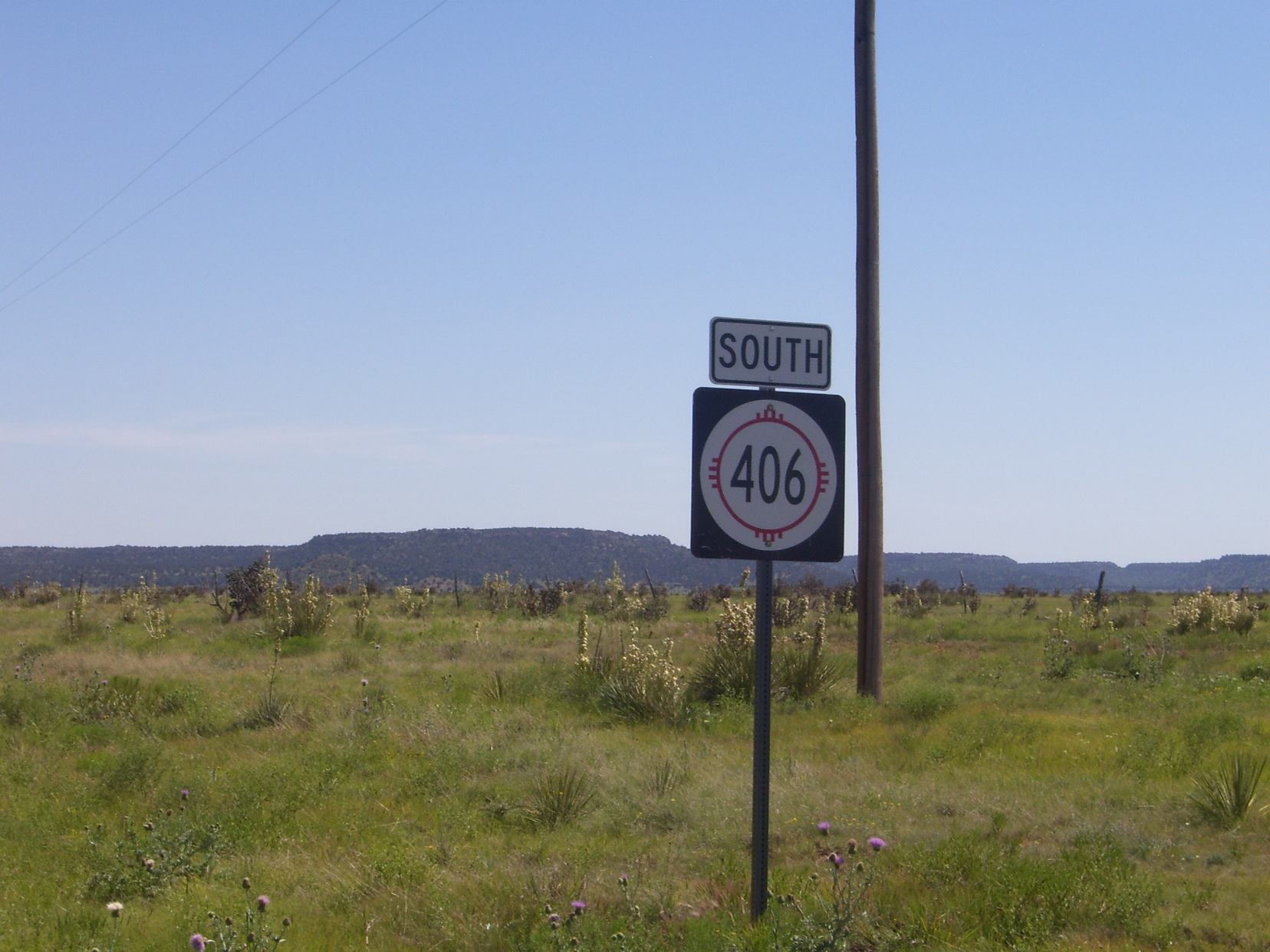
NM 406 southbound just south of its northern terminus.

State Road 406 (NM 406) is a 35.145-mile-long (56.560 km) state highway in Union County, New Mexico, United States. NM 406's southern terminus is at U.S. Route 56/64/412 near Clayton, and its northern terminus is at NM 456 near the Oklahoma border. The route stays entirely within Union County.

== Route description ==
SR 406 begins at an intersection with US 56, US 64, and US 412 in a concurrency. The road then heads north, passing a few farms. At an intersection with County Route A055, the route turns right toward the Oklahoma border. The road zigzags northward and eastward again to an intersection with SR 410, which heads east toward Wheeless, Oklahoma. At SR 410, SR 406 again turns back north and hugs the Oklahoma border. The road then winds slightly passing through mountainous terrain. It terminates at SR 456, which heads east as Oklahoma State Highway 325 toward Kenton.

== Major intersections ==
The entire route is in Union County.

Location	mi	km	Destinations	Notes
	0.000	0.000	US 56 / US 64 / US 412 / Santa Fe Trail Scenic Byway – Clayton, Boise City	Southern terminus
	3.212	5.169	NM 411 east	Western terminus of NM 411
	21.489	34.583	NM 410 east / Santa Fe Trail Scenic Byway – Wheeless	Western terminus of NM 410
	35.145	56.560	NM 456 – Folsom, Kenton	Northern terminus
1.000 mi = 1.609 km; 1.000 km = 0.621 mi
