= Amistad, New Mexico =

Unincorporated community in Union County, New Mexico, United States

- Unincorporated comumunity
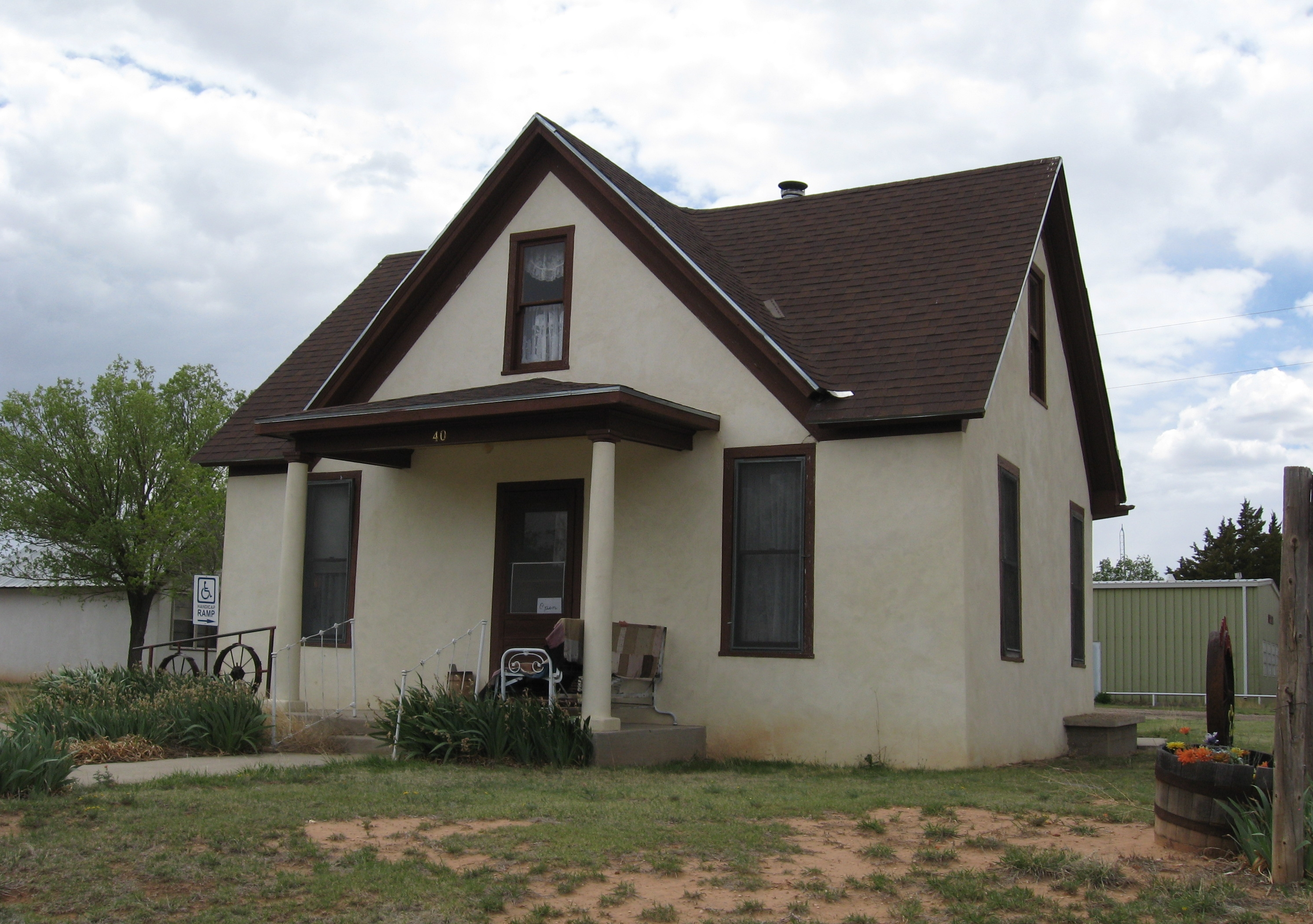
- Amistad Museum, May 2008

- Location within New Mexico Location within the United States
- Coordinates: 35°55′08″N 103°09′14″W
- Country: United States
- State: New Mexico
- County: Union
- Elevation: 4,472 ft (1,363 m)

Population
  - Total: 137
- Time zone: UTC-7 (MST)
  - Summer (DST): UTC-6 (MDT)
- ZIP Code: 88410
- Area code: 575
- GNIS feature ID: 898619

Amistad is an unincorporated community in Union County, New Mexico, United States. It is located approximately 39 miles south of Clayton on State Route 402.

== History ==
Amistad was a stop for cattle drives during the late 19th century. In 1906, Henry S. Wannamaker, a Congregational minister, promoted homesteading by placing ads in church newspapers. This led to more than 40 older ministers staking claims in Amistad. They formed "The Improvement Association" and named the community Amistad, after the Spanish word for friendship. A post office was established in 1907. At one time there were two newspapers in Amistad. The population declined in later years, but Amistad is still inhabited.

== Climate ==
According to the Köppen Climate Classification system, Amistad has a cold semi-arid climate, abbreviated "BSk" on climate maps. The hottest temperature recorded in Amistad was 108 °F (42.2 °C) on June 29, 1957 and June 16, 1977, while the coldest temperature recorded was −20 °F (−28.9 °C) on February 1, 1951, and January 4, 1959.

Climate data for Amistad, New Mexico, 1991–2020 normals, extremes 1934–present
Month	Jan	Feb	Mar	Apr	May	Jun	Jul	Aug	Sep	Oct	Nov	Dec	Year
Record high °F (°C)	80 (27)	83 (28)	91 (33)	95 (35)	101 (38)	108 (42)	107 (42)	105 (41)	103 (39)	97 (36)	89 (32)	81 (27)	108 (42)
Mean maximum °F (°C)	69.3 (20.7)	72.8 (22.7)	81.1 (27.3)	85.2 (29.6)	92.1 (33.4)	100.0 (37.8)	100.4 (38.0)	98.2 (36.8)	94.7 (34.8)	87.9 (31.1)	78.1 (25.6)	70.1 (21.2)	102.1 (38.9)
Mean daily maximum °F (°C)	48.7 (9.3)	52.4 (11.3)	60.9 (16.1)	68.5 (20.3)	77.6 (25.3)	87.7 (30.9)	90.9 (32.7)	88.2 (31.2)	81.6 (27.6)	70.4 (21.3)	58.4 (14.7)	48.5 (9.2)	69.5 (20.8)
Daily mean °F (°C)	34.3 (1.3)	37.4 (3.0)	45.3 (7.4)	52.7 (11.5)	62.6 (17.0)	72.8 (22.7)	76.9 (24.9)	74.6 (23.7)	67.3 (19.6)	55.0 (12.8)	43.5 (6.4)	34.5 (1.4)	54.7 (12.6)
Mean daily minimum °F (°C)	19.8 (−6.8)	22.5 (−5.3)	29.6 (−1.3)	36.9 (2.7)	47.6 (8.7)	57.9 (14.4)	62.8 (17.1)	61.0 (16.1)	52.9 (11.6)	39.6 (4.2)	28.5 (−1.9)	20.4 (−6.4)	40.0 (4.4)
Mean minimum °F (°C)	4.2 (−15.4)	7.3 (−13.7)	13.1 (−10.5)	22.9 (−5.1)	32.6 (0.3)	46.9 (8.3)	54.8 (12.7)	53.4 (11.9)	39.8 (4.3)	24.3 (−4.3)	12.6 (−10.8)	4.3 (−15.4)	−0.5 (−18.1)
Record low °F (°C)	−20 (−29)	−20 (−29)	−6 (−21)	9 (−13)	20 (−7)	37 (3)	44 (7)	42 (6)	26 (−3)	6 (−14)	−11 (−24)	−12 (−24)	−20 (−29)
Average precipitation inches (mm)	0.37 (9.4)	0.32 (8.1)	0.71 (18)	0.96 (24)	1.78 (45)	1.87 (47)	2.51 (64)	2.78 (71)	1.77 (45)	1.60 (41)	0.51 (13)	0.48 (12)	15.66 (397.5)
Average snowfall inches (cm)	3.5 (8.9)	1.8 (4.6)	2.6 (6.6)	0.6 (1.5)	0.1 (0.25)	0.0 (0.0)	0.0 (0.0)	0.0 (0.0)	0.0 (0.0)	0.5 (1.3)	1.1 (2.8)	3.9 (9.9)	14.1 (35.85)
Average precipitation days (≥ 0.01 in)	2.0	2.1	3.4	3.9	5.3	6.0	6.7	7.4	5.0	4.2	2.6	2.4	51.0
Average snowy days (≥ 0.1 in)	1.4	1.2	0.9	0.4	0.0	0.0	0.0	0.0	0.0	0.3	0.8	1.7	6.7
Source 1: NOAA
Source 2: xmACIS2

== See also ==
- Amistad Gymnasium
- Category:Unincorporated communities in New Mexico
