= Carrizo =

Carrizo may refer to:

== Places ==
- Carrizo, Arizona, a place in Gila County, Arizona
- Carrizo Creek (Arizona)
- Carrizo Creek (New Mexico/Texas)
- North Carrizo Creek, a creek formed in Colorado and flowing to Oklahoma
- South Carrizo Creek, a creek in Oklahoma
- East Carrizo Creek, a creek in Colorado
- West Carrizo Creek, a creek in Colorado
- Carrizo Gorge Railway, a passenger and freight railway between Tijuana, Baja California, Mexico, and Plaster City, California, United States
- Carrizo Hill, Texas, a census-designated place located in Dimmit County, Texas, United States
- Carrizo Impact Area, a former United States Navy bombing range in the Anza-Borrego Desert in California, United States
- Carrizo Mountains, a mountain range located on the Colorado Plateau in northeastern Arizona
- Carrizo Peak, a mountain in New Mexico
- Carrizo Plain, a large enclosed plain in eastern San Luis Obispo County, California, United States
- Carrizo de la Ribera, a municipality in León, Spain
- Carrizo Springs, Texas, a city located in Dimmit County, Texas, United States

== People ==
- Amadeo Carrizo (1926–2020), Argentine football goalkeeper
- Antonio Carrizo (1926–2016), Argentine radio and television presenter
- Federico Carrizo (born 1991), Argentine footballer
- Juan Carlos Carrizo (born 1987), Argentine footballer
- Juan Pablo Carrizo (born 1984), Argentine footballer
- Pedro Carrizo (born 1980), Chilean footballer
- Susan Carrizo (born 1984), winner of Miss World Venezuela 2005
- Carrizo people, an Indigenous people of Tamaulipas, Mexico

== Other uses ==
- Carrizo (plant), Spanish vernacular name of several plants found in a carrizal
- AMD Carrizo, a hardware platform from AMD featuring the Excavator microarchitecture
- Comecrudan languages, a group of possibly related languages spoken in the southernmost part of the U.S. state of Texas and in northern Mexico
