= Carrizo Creek and Carrizo Wash =

Carrizo Creek and Carrizo Wash may refer to various streams or washes (arroyos) named Carrizo, the Spanish word for "reeds". Streams and washes of this name include:

== Salton Sea tributaries ==
- Carrizo Creek and Wash (California), a stream and arroyo in San Diego County and Imperial County, California

== Gulf of California tributaries ==
- Carrizo Wash, a wash under the Carrizo Bridges in Arizona
- Carrizo Creek (Arizona), which forms north of Cibecue in Navajo County, Arizona, a tributary of the Salt River

== Gulf of Mexico tributaries ==
- Carrizo Creek (Mescalero Reservation, New Mexico), a tributary of the Rio Ruidoso
- Carrizo Creek (New Mexico/Texas), sometimes termed Carrizo River, a tributary of Rita Blanca Creek
- East Carrizo Creek, formed in Colorado north of Mt. Carrizo
- West Carrizo Creek, formed in Colorado west-southwest of Kim
- North Carrizo Creek, formed in Baca County, Colorado from the confluence of East and West Carrizo Creek, flowing into Oklahoma
- South Carrizo Creek, formed near the Oklahoma/New Mexico state line and flowing into the Cimarron River

== See also ==
- Carrizo Creek Station, a former stagecoach station on Carrizo Creek in California
