= Carrizo Creek (Arizona) =

Stream in Navajo County, Arizona

Location
- Country: United States

Physical characteristics
- Source
  - location: northwest of Cibecue, Arizona
  - coordinates: 33°47′02″N 110°19′36″W
- Mouth: Salt River
  - location: west of Fort Apache, Arizona
  - coordinates: 34°17′33″N 110°39′46″W

Carrizo Creek forms in Arizona north of Cibecue, before flowing generally southeast, being joined by Corduroy Creek around the town of Carrizo, and continuing generally south to join the Salt River.

It is not to be confused with the Carrizo Creek that forms in New Mexico west-southwest of Grenville and flows generally east-southeast into Texas to become a tributary of Rita Blanca Creek around Dalhart.

It is also not to be confused with East, West, North, or South Carrizo Creek. East Carrizo Creek forms in Colorado north of Mt. Carrizo and east of Kim, Colorado, and flows generally southeast before turning south. West Carrizo Creek forms in Colorado west-southwest of Kim, and flows generally east to connect with East Carrizo Creek to form North Carrizo Creek at a point about 6 miles north of the Preston Monument, being the tripoint of Colorado, Oklahoma, and New Mexico. North Carrizo Creek flows from that point in Colorado generally south-southeast into Oklahoma to join the Cimarron River northeast of Kenton, Oklahoma.

South Carrizo Creek forms either just west of the Oklahoma line in New Mexico, or east inside Oklahoma to the northwest of Wheeless, Oklahoma. It travels generally northeast through Black Mesa State Park where it is impounded to form Lake Carl Etling, before being joined by Willow Creek and continuing northeast to flow into the Cimarron River.
