= Oklahoma State Highway 325 =

State highway in Cimarron County, Oklahoma, United States

State Highway 325
- SH-325 highlighted in red

Route information
- Maintained by ODOT
- Length: 38.08 mi (61.28 km)

Major junctions
- West end: NM 456 at the New Mexico state line near Kenton
- East end: US 56 / US 64 / US 385 / US 412 / SH-3 in Boise City

Location
- Country: United States
- State: Oklahoma

Highway system
- Oklahoma State Highway System; Interstate; US; State; Turnpikes
← US 287	→ SH-344

State Highway 325, officially, SH-325, is a 38.08-mile (61.28 km) state highway Cimarron County, Oklahoma, United States, that connects New Mexico State Road 456 (at the New Mexico border west of Kenton) to the traffic circle in Boise City that includes U.S. Route 56, U.S. Route 64, U.S. Route 287, U.S. Route 385, U.S. Route 412 and Oklahoma State Highway 3. Along the way it provides access to Black Mesa State Park, near Black Mesa, the highest point in the state of Oklahoma.

== Route description ==
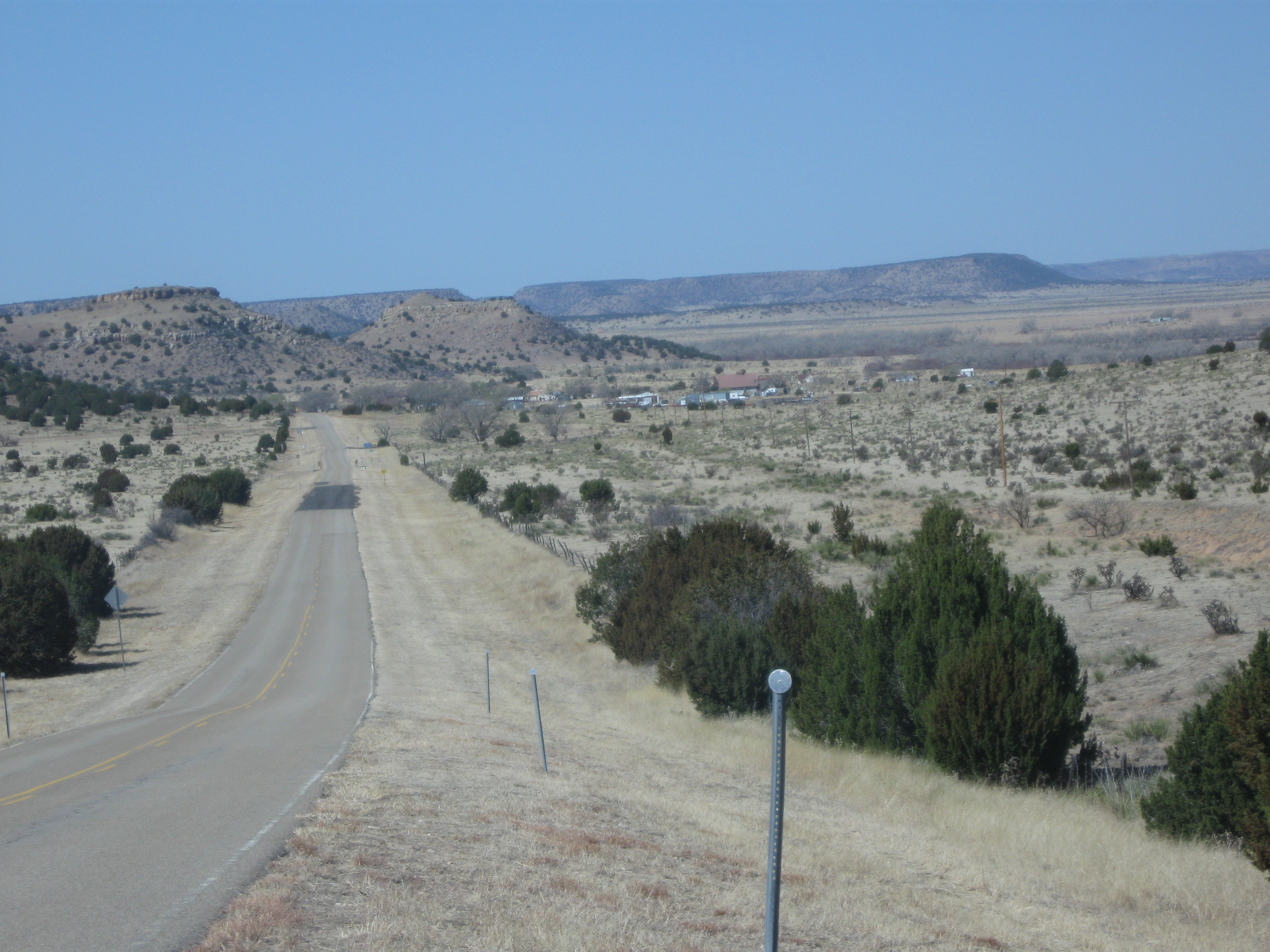
West along SH-325 toward Kenton, March 2009

SH-325 begins at the tip of the Oklahoma Panhandle, where NM 456 crosses into Oklahoma from Union County, New Mexico. Just east of the state line, the highway bridges Carrizozo Creek, just upstream of where it empties into the Cimarron River. Just east of the state line, SH-325 passes through the town of Kenton. Further east of Kenton, the highway crosses over Tesesquite Creek and South Carrizo Creek, both tributaries of the Cimarron River. After crossing South Carrizo Creek, the road gradually curves onto a south–north alignment.

SH-325 heads south for about 12 miles (19 km), crossing the intermittent Cold Springs Creek. The road then turns east. The remainder of the route is a mostly flat, straight shot into Boise City, with a minor curve to the west of town where it crosses a railroad track. The route ends at the traffic circle surrounding the Cimarron County Courthouse in downtown Boise City.

== History ==
The road between Kenton and Boise City that is now SH-325 has carried a bevy of designations, and has been intermittently included and excluded from the state highway system over the years. The road was first numbered as a state route in 1926, when the original SH-11 was extended west from its original terminus in Boise City. At the same time, the U.S. route system was being introduced to Oklahoma, and under this new system, the highway received the additional designation as US-64. On the 1928 official state map, this portion of highway is marked as "Not maintained", though the route continued to carry both highway designations.

By 1930, the road was once again state-maintained, and the old SH-11 designation had been done away with as the U.S. route system established itself and superseded the now-redundant state highway numbers that it replaced. US-64, using the Kenton route, would continue to serve as the only state highway connection to New Mexico until the middle of the century.

On July 7, 1947, US-64 was shifted onto a new road that had opened, extending southwest from Boise City and crossing into New Mexico near the southwest corner of the Panhandle. This left the route to Kenton without a designation, which it would lack for the rest of the 1940s, the 1950s, and most of the 1960s.

Kenton was briefly reconnected to the state highway system when State Highway 134 was designated along the old alignment of US-64. This highway was only shown on the 1963 state highway map, implying that it was commissioned the year before and revoked sometime that year. By the time SH-134 was designated, the highway had been fully paved. When SH-134 was decommissioned, its alignment continued to persist on the state highway map, with the legend "(not on highway system)" and no shields.

The old US-64 route to Kenton finally received its present-day designation in 1973, when it was numbered after the already-existing NM 325, which once extended to the Oklahoma state line.

In December 2021, state senator Bill Coleman proposed renaming three inches of a westbound lane as the "Lincoln Riley Highway" following Riley's departure from the University of Oklahoma to the University of Southern California.

== Junction list ==
The entire route is in Cimarron County.

Location	mi	km	Destinations	Notes
	0.00	0.00	NM 456 – Seneca, Folsom	Continuation west from western terminus
	0.00	0.00	New Mexico state line	Western terminus
Boise City	38.08	61.28	US 56 / US 64 / US 287 / US 385 / US 412 / SH-3 (Cimmaron Avenue) – Denver (Colorado), Guymon, Clayton (New Mexico)	Traffic circle around Cimarron County courthouse; eastern terminus
1.000 mi = 1.609 km; 1.000 km = 0.621 mi

== See also ==
- List of state highways in Oklahoma
