= Carrizo Creek (New Mexico/Texas) =

Location
- Country: United States

Physical characteristics
- Source
  - location: New Mexico
- Mouth
  - location: 36.0679°N 102.5867°W

The Carrizo Creek of New Mexico and Texas is a 145-mile-long (233 km) watercourse. It extends from west of Grenville, New Mexico, into Texas, flowing into Rita Blanca Creek just west of Dalhart, Texas. With Rita Blanca Creek being a tributary of the Canadian River, water from Carrizo Creek eventually travels via the Arkansas and Mississippi rivers to reach the Gulf of Mexico. It is sometimes also known as the Carrizo River.

This is not to be confused with the Carrizo Creek originating within the Mescalero Reservation in New Mexico which forms Mescalero Lake and terminates in the Rio Ruidoso, nor with the Carrizo Creek in Arizona which forms somewhere north of Cibecue, Arizona before flowing generally southeast and then south to join the Salt River. It is also not to be confused with East, West, North, and South Carrizo Creek. East Carrizo Creek forms in Colorado north of Mt. Carrizo and east of Kim, Colorado, and flows generally southeast before turning south. West Carrizo Creek forms in Colorado west-southwest of Kim, and flows generally east to connect with East Carrizo Creek to form North Carrizo Creek at a point about 6 miles north of the Preston Monument, being the tripoint of Colorado, Oklahoma and New Mexico. North Carrizo Creek flows from that point in Colorado generally south-southeast into Oklahoma to join the Cimarron River northeast of Kenton, Oklahoma. South Carrizo Creek forms either just west of the Oklahoma line in New Mexico, or east inside Oklahoma to the northwest of Wheeless, Oklahoma, to travel generally northeast through Black Mesa State Park where it is impounded to form Lake Carl Etling, before being joined by Willow Creek and continuing northeast to flow into the Cimarron River.

== See also ==
- List of rivers of New Mexico
- List of rivers of Texas
