= Mesa de Maya =

Mesa in Colorado, United States

Coordinates: 37.11°N 103.56°W

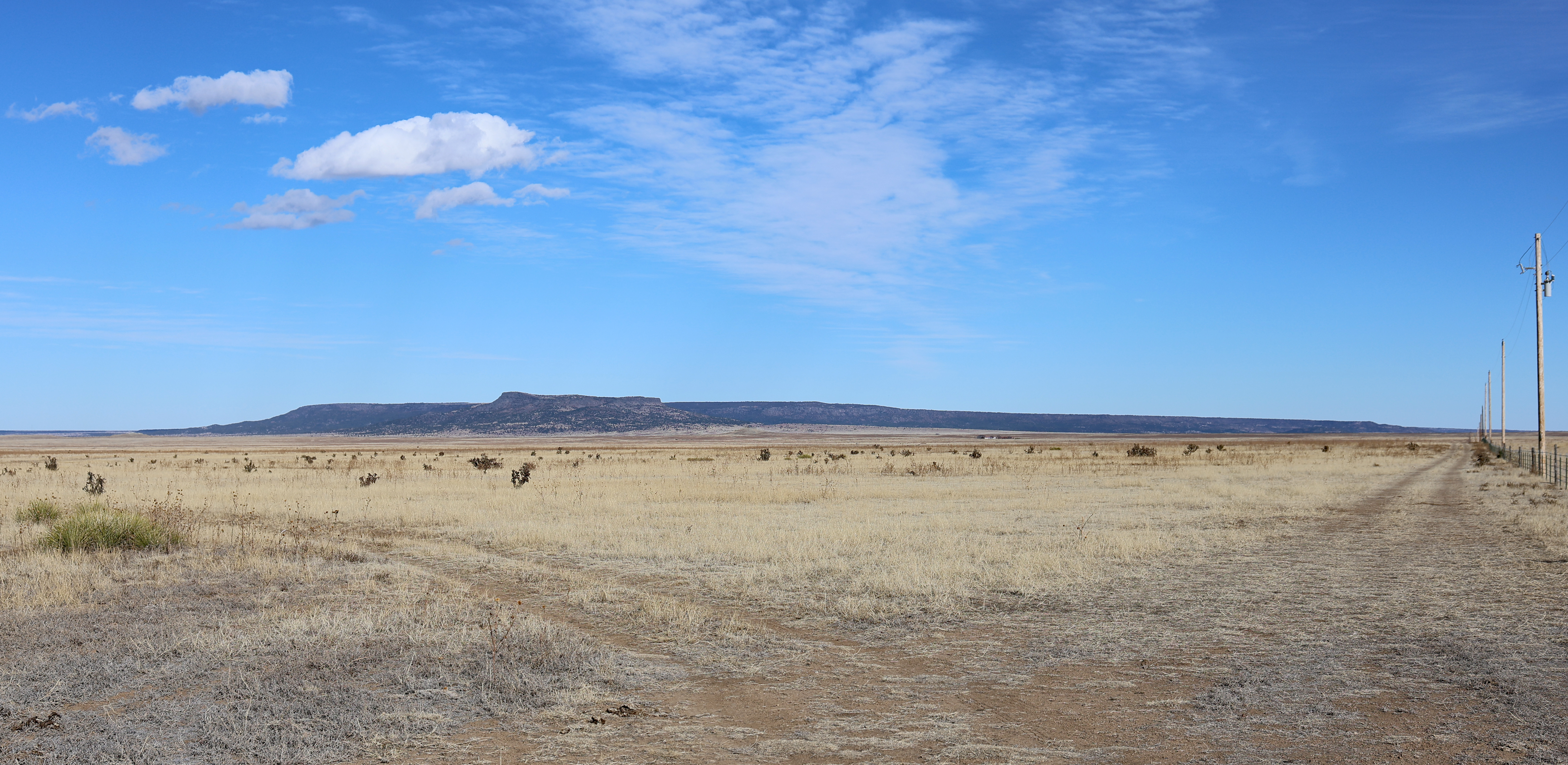
The Mesa de Maya seen from Colorado State Highway 389 east of Trinidad, Colorado, looking east

The Mesa de Maya is a prominent volcanic tableland rising 500 feet (150 m) to 1,200 feet (370 m) above the Great Plains in southeastern Colorado. A narrow finger of the mesa extends eastward through the northeastern corner of New Mexico and a few miles into Oklahoma where it is known as the Black Mesa. The elevation of the Mesa de Maya ranges from 4,800 feet (1,500 m) at its easternmost extension to 6,902 feet (2,104 m) in the west.

The high mesas eastward from Raton, New Mexico and Trinidad, Colorado are sometimes collectively called the Mesa de Maya, Raton Mesas, or the Raton mesa region. All the mesas are volcanic in origin caused by lava flows which solidified into basalt. Over time the softer sedimentary rock surrounding the basalt eroded leaving several distinct large elevated tablelands with precipitous sides which include the Mesa de Maya.

== Description ==
Mesa de Maya originated from a basaltic lava flow 180 million years ago. Originating in Colorado at a place named Piney Mountain, the lava flow measures 55 miles long, from one-half (1 km) to 8 miles (13 km) wide, and 600 feet (180 m) thick. The uneroded portion of the lava flow consists today of the Mesa de Maya and Black Mesa.

Mesa de Maya's westernmost extension is 11 miles northeast of Branson, Colorado in Las Animas County, Colorado. The mesa has two parts. The principal part is about 24 miles long, extending southeast, and six miles wide with elevations from 6,902 feet (2,104 m) sloping downward to the east to 5,600 feet (1,700 m). The top of the mesa is grassland, mostly shortgrass prairie and steppe vegetation; the slopes leading to the top are mostly forested, primarily by juniper and pinyon pine with a few ponderosa pines and quaking aspen in cooler and wetter locations. Mesa de Maya is the only place in Colorado where mesquite is found. North Carrizo Creek has its headwaters on the Mesa de Maya.

From the core area of the Mesa de Maya the second part, a long finger about one mile wide and called Black Mesa, extends another 25 miles (40 km) southeastward into New Mexico and Oklahoma running between North Carrizo Creek and the Cimarron River and terminating at the junction of the two streams. The highest point of Black Mesa in New Mexico is 5,266 feet (1,605 m) and in Oklahoma is 4,973 feet (1,516 m). A Nature Conservancy preserve of 1,600 acres (650 ha) gives access to the summit of Black Mesa in Oklahoma. This is the only part of the Mesa de Maya and Black Mesa that is accessible to the public. All other parts of the Mesa are privately owned cattle ranches.

Wildlife is abundant on and around the Mesa de Maya. Several ranchers supplement their income by permitting hunts of trophy elk on their lands. Mule deer, black bears, cougars, bighorn sheep, pronghorns, and golden eagles are found. Several ranchers also permit bird watchers and naturalists to visit their lands for a daily fee.

Only one public road (dirt) crosses the mesa at approximately its midpoint, and no large towns or cities are nearby. A few ranch families are the only residents near the mesa. The nearest settlements to Mesa de Maya are Kim, Colorado and Kenton, Oklahoma, both of which receive 16.7 inches (420 mm) of precipitation annually, mostly in the three summer months. That total is probably representative of the precipitation on the mesa.

== Piñon Canyon Maneuver Site ==
In 2003, the U.S. Army proposed to expand the existing Piñon Canyon Maneuver Site (PCMS) by as much as 6.9 million acres (27,923 km^{2}) of land owned by private citizens and the Comanche National Grassland in southeastern Colorado. The proposed expansion would include the Mesa de Maya in Colorado and make PCMS three times larger than any other military base in the United States. Two citizens organizations were founded to oppose the expansion: The Pinyon Canyon Expansion Opposition Coalition and Not l More Acre. They characterized the proposed expansion as "one colossal land grab." The impetus for these organizations came from ranchers and local citizens who wished to preserve private property and the traditional ranching economy of southeastern Colorado. In 2013, the Army canceled the proposed PCMS expansion.
