= Carrizozo Creek =

Location
- Country: United States

Physical characteristics
- Source
  - location: Northeast of Grenville, New Mexico
- Mouth
  - location: West of Kenton, Oklahoma
  - coordinates: 36°54′23″N 102°59′11″W

Carrizozo Creek is a watercourse in the northeast corner of New Mexico, with a small portion extending into the northwestern Oklahoma Panhandle. The creek originates northwest of Clayton Lake State Park and northeast of Grenville, New Mexico about halfway to the Colorado border, being just north of Corrumpa Creek and just west of New Mexico State Road 370. It meanders generally east-northeast into Oklahoma, loops northwest heading back into New Mexico, and then turns generally east flowing into Oklahoma again. Where Carrizozo Creek and the Dry Cimarron River come together in Cimarron County, Oklahoma west of Kenton, the Cimarron River is formed.

Despite the name, this creek is nowhere near the town of Carrizozo, New Mexico, which is hundreds of miles to the southwest. Nor should it be confused with New Mexico's Carrizo Creek, which is dozens of miles south of it. Carrizozo Creek should also not be confused with North Carrizo Creek or South Carrizo Creek, each of which separately join the Cimarron River in Oklahoma, but further to the east.

The creek passes through several named canyons in New Mexico, including Road Canyon, Dry Canyon, Black Canyon and Carl Canyon.

== See also ==
- List of rivers of New Mexico
- List of rivers of Oklahoma
