= Carrizal =

Carrizal may refer to:

== Places ==
=== Europe ===
- Cerecinos del Carrizal, municipality of Zamora, Spain

=== North America ===
- Carrizal, Chihuahua, Mexico, a small town between Ciudad Chihuahua and Juarez
  - Battle of Carrizal, battle between United States and Mexico in the Mexican Revolution

=== South America ===
- Carrizal Municipality, municipality of Miranda State, Venezuela
- Carrizal Bajo, Hamlet in Chile through which FPMR smuggled Cuban arms into Chile in 1986
- El Carrizal Dam, dam of Tunuyán River, Argentina

== See also ==
- Carrizo (disambiguation)
