= Carrizo Creek (Mescalero Reservation, New Mexico) =

Stream in New Mexico, United States

Coordinates: 33°19′28″N 105°39′15″W

Carrizo Creek is a stream in Otero and Lincoln counties in the U.S. state of New Mexico. It forms to the southwest of, and feeds into, Mescalero Lake, just inside the north central border of the Mescalero Reservation. Mescalero Lake is stocked with trout, and is the site of a resort & casino. The creek then continues east of the lake. It turns north and then east again, shadowed by Carrizo Canyon Road, before feeding into the Rio Ruidoso south-southeast of Ruidoso, New Mexico.

This should not be confused with the Carrizo Creek extending from west of Grenville, New Mexico, into Rita Blanca Creek just west of Dalhart, Texas, nor with many similarly named Carrizo Creeks in other locations.
