= Time in Oklahoma =

The entirety of the U.S. state of Oklahoma is legally in the Central Time Zone. It observes daylight saving time.

However, the town of Kenton unofficially observes Mountain Time in order to stay in sync with nearby New Mexico.

== IANA time zone database ==
The IANA time zone database identifier for Oklahoma is America/Chicago.
