= West Carrizo Creek =

Location
- Country: United States

Physical characteristics
- Source
  - location: Las Animas County, Colorado
- Mouth
  - location: Baca County, Colorado
  - coordinates: 37°5′28″N 103°1′25″W
  - elevation: 4,564 feet (1,391 m)
- Length: 60 kilometers (37 mi)

Basin features
- Progression: North Carrizo Creek—Cimarron River—Arkansas—Mississippi
- Tributaries
  - left: Colorado Creek; Saltillo Creek; Tecolate Creek; Pintada Creek; Cottonwood Creek
  - right: Tomasa Creek; Owl Roost Creek; Middle Water Creek

West Carrizo Creek rises on the Mesa de Maya in Las Animas County, Colorado west-southwest of Kim, Colorado at an elevation of about 6,600 ft (2,000 m) and flows generally east for about 40 miles (64 km). At an elevation of 4,564 ft (1,391 m), it connects with East Carrizo Creek, which forms in Colorado north of Mt. Carrizo and east of Kim, and which flows generally southeast before turning south to form North Carrizo Creek at a point about six miles north of the Preston Monument, the tripoint of Colorado, Oklahoma and New Mexico.

West Carrizo Creek flows through grassland and mesas with pinyon-juniper forests found on steep hillsides and cottonwoods along the creek. The climate is semi-arid steppe, Bsk in the Köppen Classification system. Most of the land near the creek is privately owned, although a few tracts of land are part of Comanche National Grassland. There are no towns or settlement along or near the creek.

== See also ==
- East Carrizo Creek
- South Carrizo Creek
- Carrizo Creek (New Mexico/Texas)
- Carrizo Creek (Arizona)
