= East Carrizo Creek =

Location
- Country: United States

Physical characteristics
- Source
  - location: Las Animas County, Colorado
- Mouth
  - location: Baca County, Colorado
  - coordinates: 37°5′27″N 103°1′32″W
  - elevation: 4,570 feet (1,390 m)
- Length: 19.3 km (12.0 mi)

Basin features
- Progression: North Carrizo Creek—Cimarron River—Arkansas—Mississippi

East Carrizo Creek rises in Las Animas County, Colorado north of Mt. Carrizo and east of Kim, Colorado, and flows generally southeast before turning south. It joins with West Carrizo Creek at a point about 6 miles north of the Preston Monument to form North Carrizo Creek. North Carrizo Creek then flows generally south-southeast into Oklahoma to join the Cimarron River northeast of Kenton, Oklahoma.

East Carrizo Creek flows through Carrizo Canyon, a small canyon located within the Comanche National Grassland that is dotted with juniper and cottonwood trees, and along which American Indian petroglyphs can be found. The location includes a hiking trail and a picnic area.

== See also ==
- West Carrizo Creek
- South Carrizo Creek
- Carrizo Creek (New Mexico/Texas)
- Carrizo Creek (Arizona)
