= Black Mesa (Oklahoma, Colorado, New Mexico) =

Mesa in the U.S. States of Colorado, New Mexico, and Oklahoma

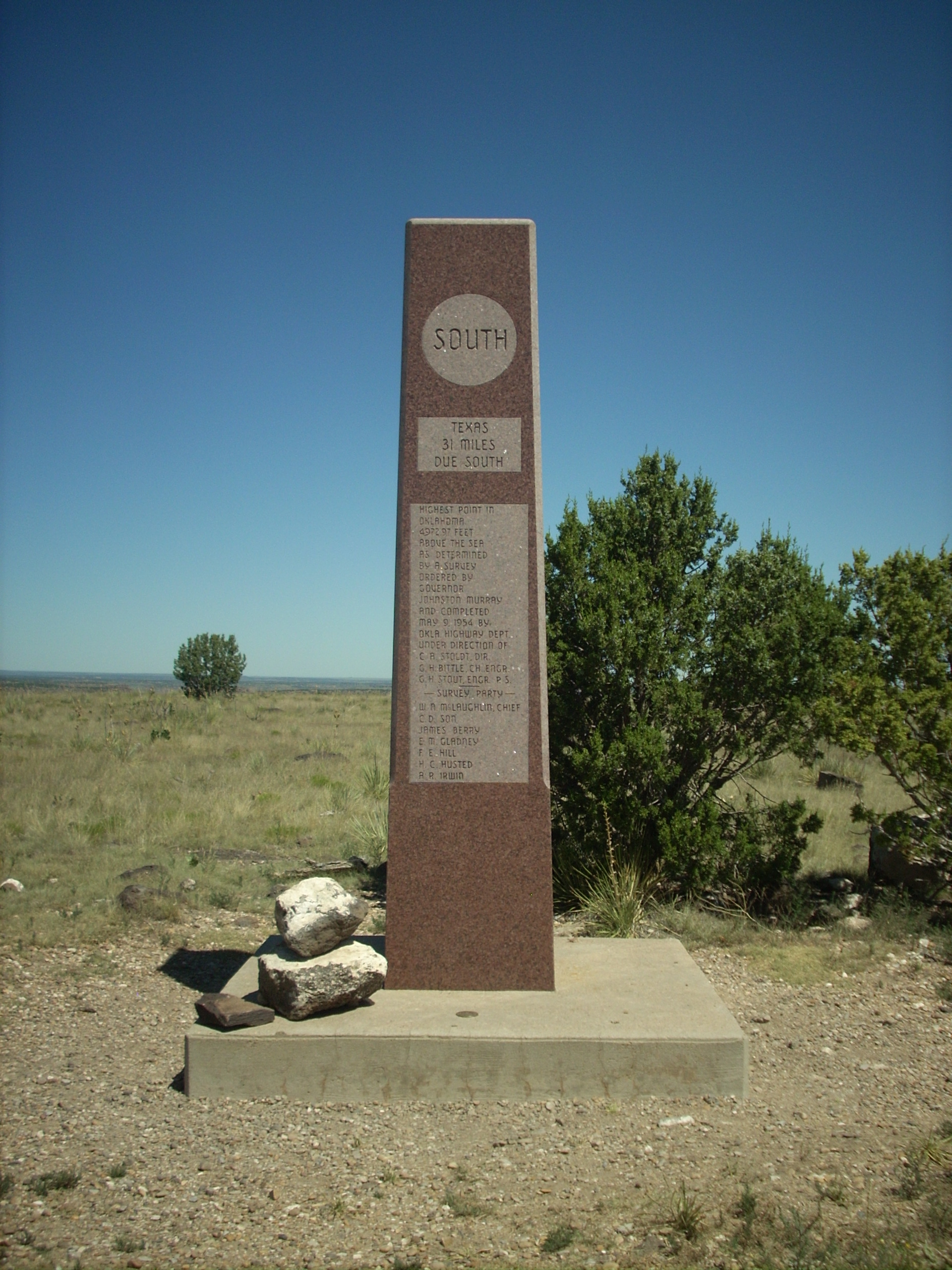
- Black Mesa, highest point in Oklahoma

Highest point
- Elevation: 4,973 ft (1,516 m)
- Listing: U.S. state high point 23rd
- Coordinates: 36°55′55″N 102°59′52″W

Geography
- Location within Oklahoma Location within the United States
- Location: Colorado / New Mexico / Oklahoma, U.S.
- Topo map: USGS Jacks Gap

Geology
- Mountain type: Mesa

Climbing
- Easiest route: Hike

Black Mesa is a mesa located in an area covering parts of the U.S. states of Colorado, New Mexico, and Oklahoma. It extends from Mesa de Maya, Colorado southeasterly 28 miles (45 km) crossing into the northeast corner of New Mexico, and ending in the Oklahoma panhandle along the north bank of the Cimarron River at its confluence with the North Carrizo Creek near Kenton. Its highest elevation is 5,705 feet (1,739 m) in Colorado. The highest point of Black Mesa within New Mexico is 5,239 feet (1,597 m). In northwestern Cimarron County, Oklahoma, Black Mesa reaches 4,973 feet (1,516 m), the highest point in the state of Oklahoma. The plateau that formed at the top of the mesa has been known as a "geological wonder" of North America. There is abundant wildlife in this shortgrass prairie environment, including mountain lions, butterflies, and the Texas horned lizard. (In Colorado, Black Mesa also refers to a summit in Gunnison County and a mountain pass in Dolores County.)

== History ==
The plateau has been home to Plains Indians.

In the late-nineteenth and early twentieth century the area was a hideout for outlaws such as William Coe and Black Jack Ketchum. The outlaws built a fort known as the Robbers' Roost. The stone fort housed a blacksmith shop, gun ports, and a piano. The present-day Oklahoma Panhandle area, which was then considered a no man's land, lacked law enforcement agencies and hence the outlaws found it safe to hide in the region. However, as new settlers arrived in the area for copper and coal mining and also for cattle ranching activities by grazing cattle in the mesa region, law enforcement became more effective, and the outlaws were brought under control. In more recent times, at least one person has claimed to have been abducted by extraterrestrial aliens at Black Mesa.

== Geography ==
The Mesa is situated in Cimarron County in the Oklahoma Panhandle. The Black Mesa plateau is part of the Rocky Mountains and the shortgrass prairie. Some features include the Old Maid Rock, and Devil's Tombstone. The mesa's base includes a 200-foot (61 m) escarpment which is parallel with the Dry Cimarron River's north bank. Its highest elevation is 5,705 feet (1,739 m) in Colorado. The highest point of Black Mesa within New Mexico is 5,239 feet (1,597 m). In northwestern Cimarron County, Oklahoma, Black Mesa reaches 4,973 feet (1,516 m), the highest point in the state of Oklahoma.

A hiking trail of 4.2 miles (6.8 km) leads from the preserve to the summit which rises about 800 feet (240 m) above the level of the surrounding plains, the Nature Conservancy recommends four hours minimum for a round trip; overnight camping is not permitted.

The mesa's highest point within Oklahoma is marked by a granite obelisk, and a visitors' log.

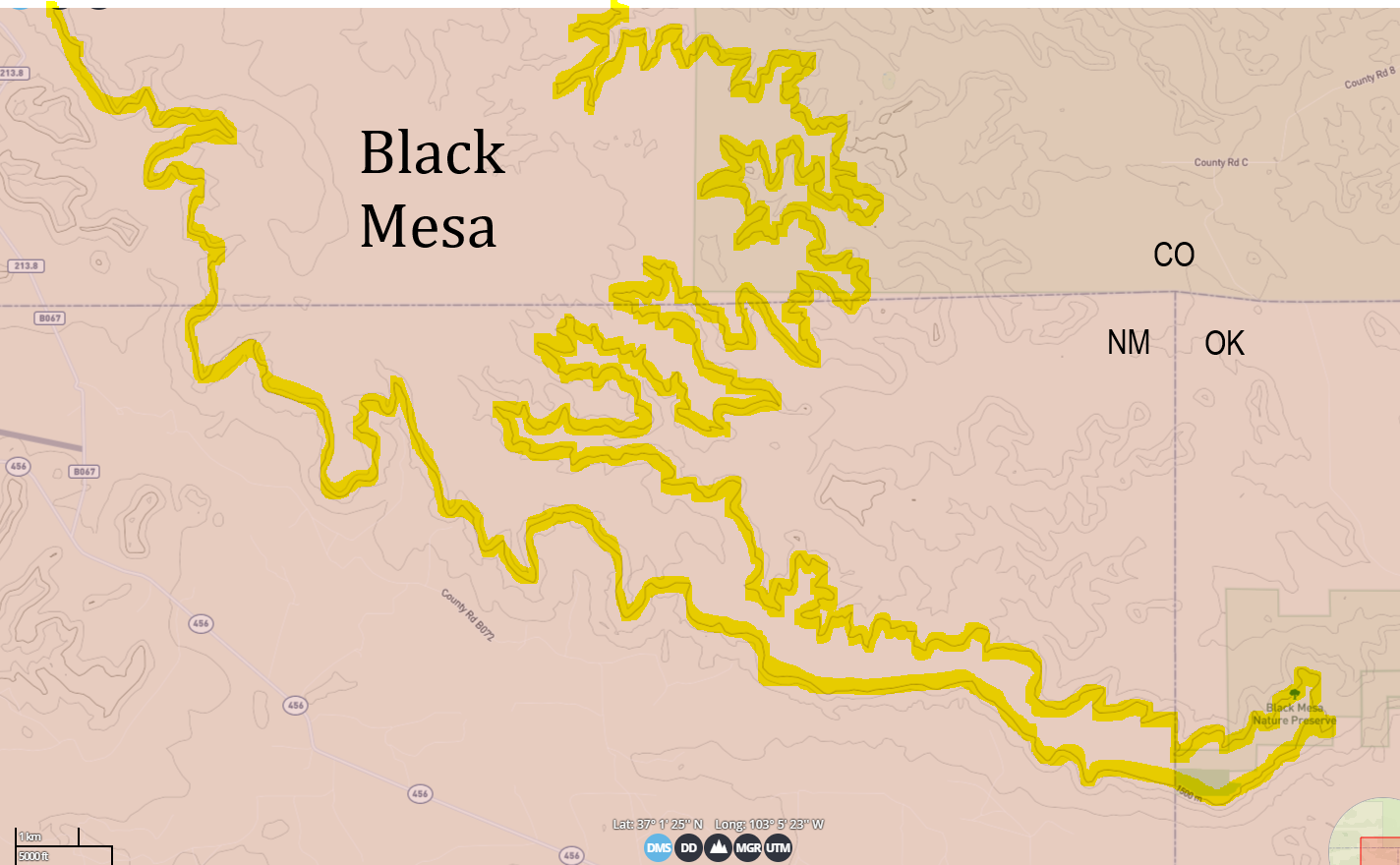
Topographical map of Black Mesa in Oklahoma, New Mexico and part of Colorado, with highlighted meter elevation elevation contour

== Climate ==
Black Mesa is not only the highest point in Oklahoma but it is also the driest, harshest and coldest place in the state. A nearby weather station is located in Kenton.

Climate data for Kenton, Oklahoma (Elevation 4,330ft)
Month	Jan	Feb	Mar	Apr	May	Jun	Jul	Aug	Sep	Oct	Nov	Dec	Year
Record high °F (°C)	83 (28)	86 (30)	89 (32)	97 (36)	102 (39)	109 (43)	108 (42)	108 (42)	107 (42)	99 (37)	89 (32)	84 (29)	109 (43)
Mean daily maximum °F (°C)	50.4 (10.2)	55.1 (12.8)	62.3 (16.8)	70.3 (21.3)	78.8 (26.0)	88.6 (31.4)	92.6 (33.7)	89.9 (32.2)	83.8 (28.8)	73.5 (23.1)	59.7 (15.4)	51.3 (10.7)	71.4 (21.9)
Mean daily minimum °F (°C)	19.7 (−6.8)	23.8 (−4.6)	31.0 (−0.6)	38.7 (3.7)	48.5 (9.2)	57.8 (14.3)	63.1 (17.3)	61.5 (16.4)	53.7 (12.1)	40.6 (4.8)	29.0 (−1.7)	21.6 (−5.8)	40.8 (4.9)
Record low °F (°C)	−23 (−31)	−19 (−28)	−18 (−28)	13 (−11)	27 (−3)	39 (4)	47 (8)	44 (7)	27 (−3)	6 (−14)	−15 (−26)	−17 (−27)	−23 (−31)
Average precipitation inches (mm)	0.40 (10)	0.33 (8.4)	0.96 (24)	1.48 (38)	2.47 (63)	2.18 (55)	3.10 (79)	2.67 (68)	1.58 (40)	0.99 (25)	0.67 (17)	0.35 (8.9)	17.18 (436.3)
Average snowfall inches (cm)	4.9 (12)	3.6 (9.1)	6.4 (16)	1.3 (3.3)	0.2 (0.51)	0 (0)	0 (0)	0 (0)	0.2 (0.51)	0.5 (1.3)	2.8 (7.1)	4.1 (10)	24 (59.82)
Source: NOAA

== Geology ==
The visual and map view appearance of Black Mesa is as an "inverted valley" because erosion has removed the relatively soft sedimentary strata from either side of the resistant Raton basalt of the lava which originally had occupied and filled a river valley. The mesa is capped by erosion-resistant basaltic lava formed by a volcanic eruption 3 to 5 million years ago. The lava erupted from a vent in the Raton-Clayton volcanic field in northeastern New Mexico and southeastern Colorado. The volcanic cap to the mesa is 600 feet (180 m) thick, 55 miles (89 km) long and from 0.5 miles to 8 miles wide, which is 65 miles (105 km) to the north-northwest of Oklahoma. The erupting lava filled a stream channel in the Pliocene age Ogallala Formation. During the years since the eruption, the adjacent rock of the Ogallala and older formations have been removed leaving the valley-filling basalt perched atop a long ridge. Strata exposed along the mesa below the basalt and Ogallala include the Cretaceous Dakota Sandstone and the Jurassic Morrison Formation.

Beginning in 1935, geologists and paleontologists have searched the mesa's outcroppings, finding dinosaur fossils in the Jurassic and Triassic strata. A large quantity of dinosaur bones has been recovered from the Black Mesa locale; totaling over eighteen tonnes. These remains were split between several species, including stegosaurus, camptosaurus, diplodocus, and edmontosaurus. Clear fossil physical evidence, a distinct line of footprints believed to have been made by an allosaurus, has been found juxtaposed with the Carrizo Creek, which runs around the modern-day northern edge of the mesa.

== Protected area ==
View from the summit

The mesa lies in the protected area known as the Black Mesa Nature Preserve which was established in 1991, covering 1,600 acres (6.5 km^{2}). The preserve protects 60% of the area of the mesa peak. The peak is accessible along an 8-mile-long (13 km) trail.

Apart from the nature reserve, there is also the Black Mesa State Park encompassing 549 acres (2.22 km^{2}), with a 200 acres (0.81 km^{2}) lake known as Lake Carl Etling. The park is a recreational area with many facilities for camping, hiking and many other outdoor activities. The park is about 15 miles away from the peak.

== Wildlife ==
The flora and fauna and terrain of Black Mesa are unique in Oklahoma, more typical of the semi-arid grasslands and rocky buttes of eastern Colorado and New Mexico. Many species reach their easternmost or westernmost limits of their ranges here.

Black Mesa Nature Preserve in particular covers around 60% of the flat portion of the mesa in Oklahoma. Wildlife reported in the park and the reserve are golden eagles, piñon jays, red-tailed hawks, and mule deer, part from a bird area for bird watchers.

=== Flora ===
The vegetation of the preserve is mostly shortgrass prairie with scattered juniper trees and Cholla cactus. The summit plateau is vegetatively classified as a "Bluestem-grama shortgrass community". The preserve contains 23 plant species listed by the state as "rare".

=== Fauna ===
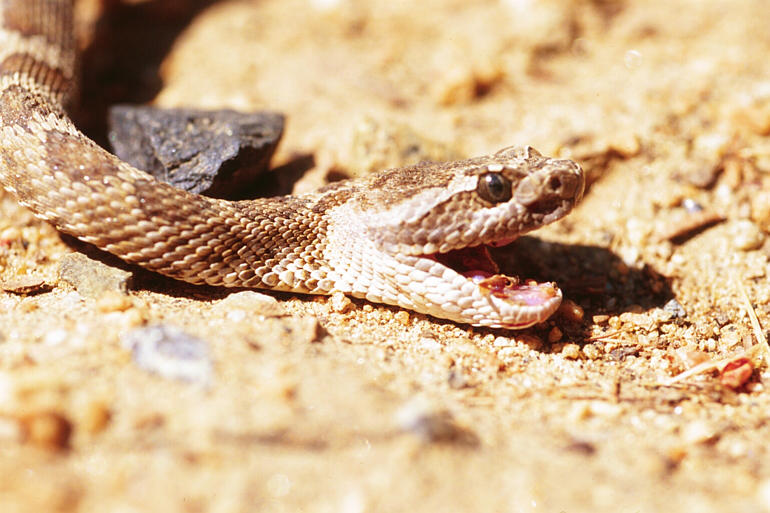
The prairie rattlesnake is well adapted to Black Mesa's dry environment.

The indigenous top predator is the mountain lion; its cousin, the smaller bobcat, is also present. The more omnivorous American black bear is present, along with a variety of prey species including bighorn sheep, mule deer, and pronghorn. Eight native species of animal are state-level designated as "rare". Two lagomorphs are present, the eastern cottontail (Sylvilagus floridanus), and the black-tailed jackrabbit (Lepus californicus). Other mammals include the dog-like coyote, as well as the much smaller prairie dog and a species of badger.

Nine snake species are found in this arid environment: the plains hog-nosed snake, western coachwhip, bullsnake, longnose snake, plains blackhead snake, blackneck garter snake, plains garter snake, lined snake, and prairie rattlesnake. The broad-headed skink, prairie racerunner, red-lipped plateau lizard, northern earless lizard, eastern collared lizard, and Texas horned lizard are also indigenous to the area. Two types of turtle, the ornate box turtle and the yellow mud turtle have been found in the Black Mesa preserve. Only one frog is found in this semi-arid habitat, the American bullfrog, but there are six other species of amphibians; the Great Plains narrowmouth toad, New Mexico spadefoot, plains spadefoot, Woodhouse's toad, red-spotted toad, and the western green toad, all toads.

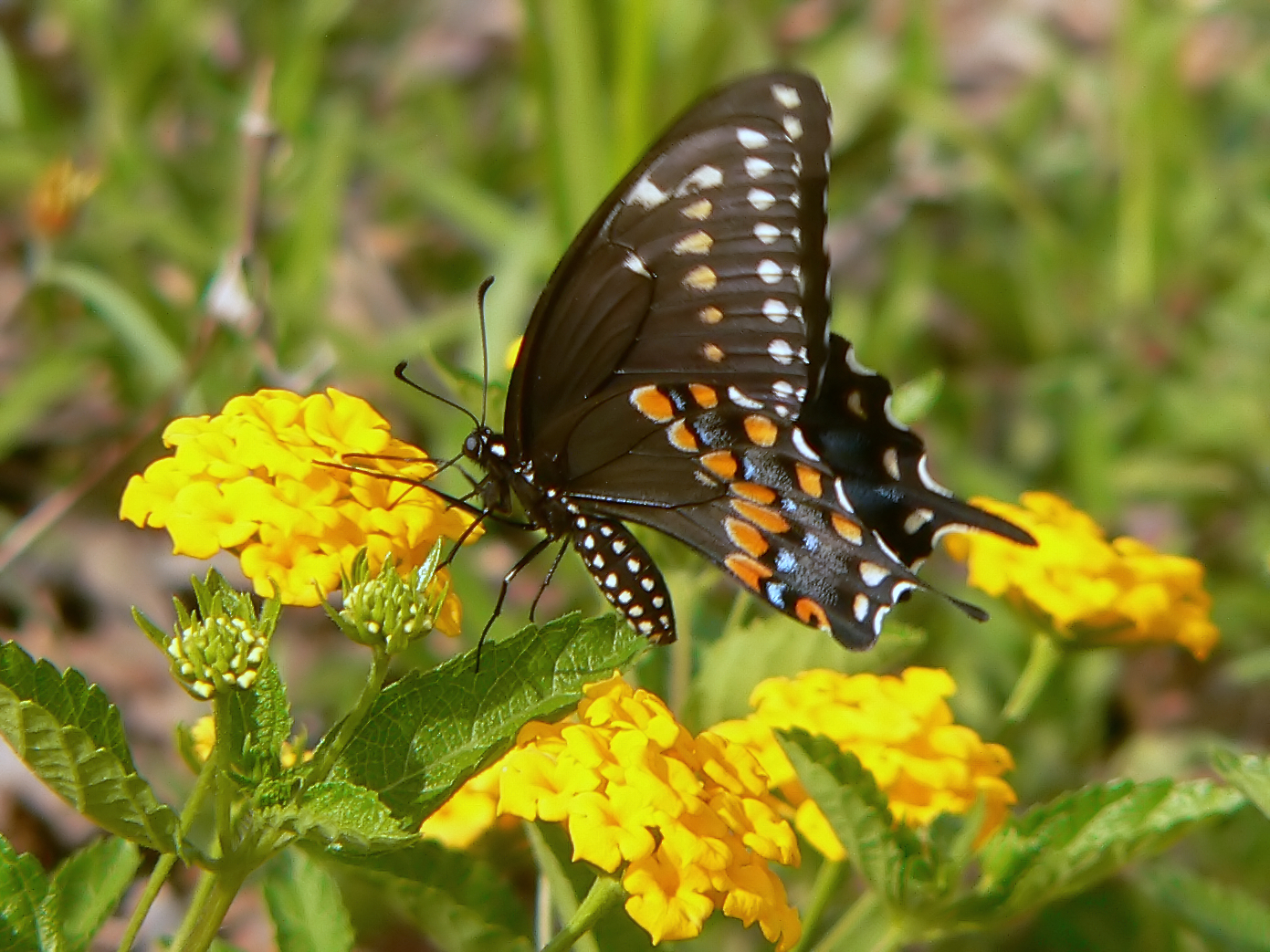
Papilio polyxenes, the state butterfly of Oklahoma, is found on Black Mesa.

Birds are common, and there are 59 species present during at least some years. Seven different raptors are found, the turkey vulture, American kestrel, golden eagle, ferruginous hawk, red-tailed hawk, Mississippi kite, and the prairie falcon, all of which are classed as being of least concern according to the IUCN. There is one other bird of prey, the western screech-owl. There are no waterfowl found on Black Mesa. The mourning dove, greater roadrunner, common nighthawk, common poorwill, ladder-backed woodpecker, red-shafted flicker, olive-sided flycatcher, Say's phoebe, ash-throated flycatcher, Cassin's kingbird, and western kingbird are also found. There are five corvids; the black-billed magpie, pinyon jay, American crow, and common raven, as well as the more local Chihuahuan raven. 61 species of butterfly are found in the preserve, including seventeen skippers, three swallowtails, four hairstreaks, a copper, four whites, nine true brushfoots, two satyrs, and a leafwing.

There are 91 species of moths on Black Mesa. No species of fish are found on Black Mesa.

== Culture ==
A permanent exhibit in the Sam Noble Museum is a diorama of the Black Mesa. It covers 2,000 square feet (190 m^{2}) and is housed in the Hall of Natural Wonders. Funds for its creation were provided by the Whitten-Newman Foundation. The diorama is touchscreen computerized and interactive and is set within the boundaries of the mesa. It is a replication of the real shape and form of the mesa and is modeled to a suitable scale which brings out the short-grass prairie habitat next to a rivulet. Stuffed and mounted animals on display are the ones found in the mesa, including eagle, vulture, mule deer, pronghorn antelope, mountain lion, prairie dog, jackrabbit and badger. An ephemeral lake is also on display in a cross section format. Star gazers gather each October near Black Mesa for the annual Okie-Tex Star Party. A life-size mule deer sculpture by acclaimed wildlife sculptor Daniel Parker, called "Black Mesa Muley", is on display at River Park in Tulsa, Oklahoma.
