= Folsom Falls =

Coordinates: 36°52′22″N 103°52′51″W

Folsom Falls is a small waterfall located on the Cimarron River in Union County in northeastern New Mexico, east of the city of Raton. It is about 3 miles northeast of the town of Folsom, New Mexico, along New Mexico State Highway 456.

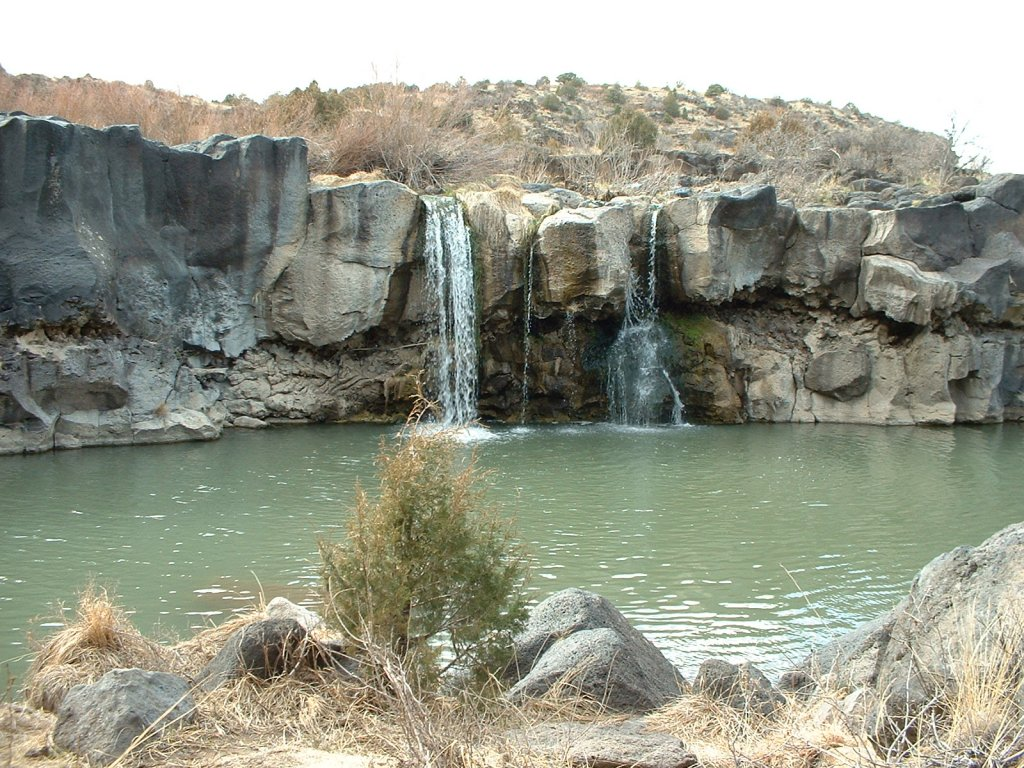

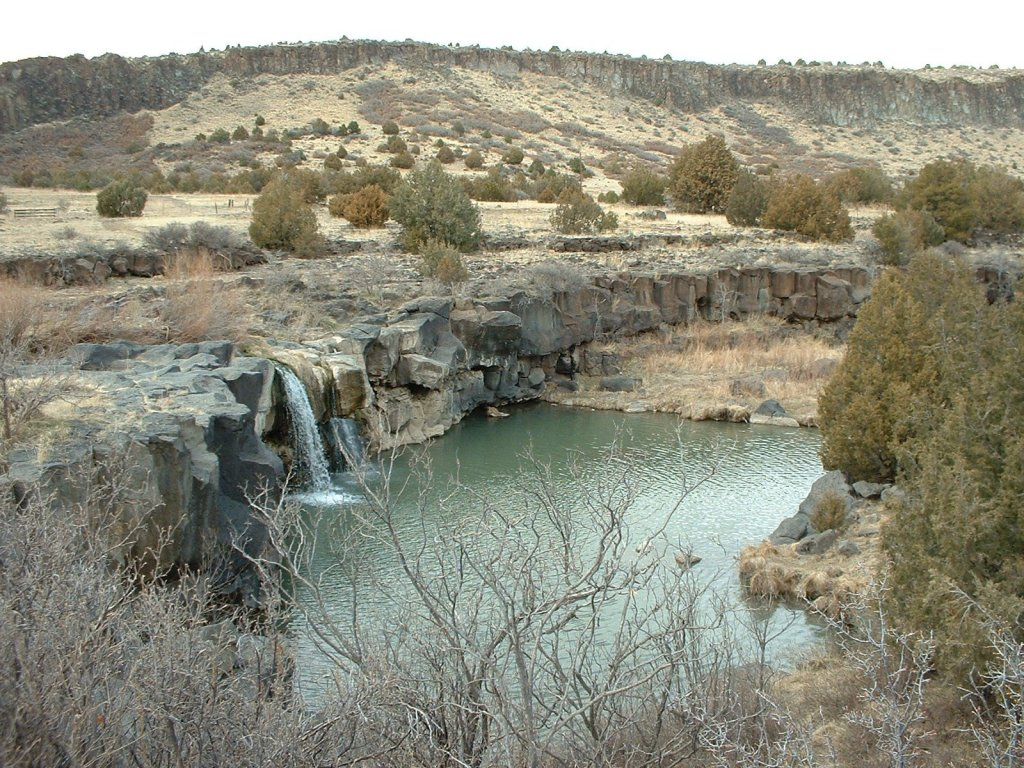

== See also ==
- List of waterfalls
