= Carrizo Peak =

Mountain in New Mexico, United States

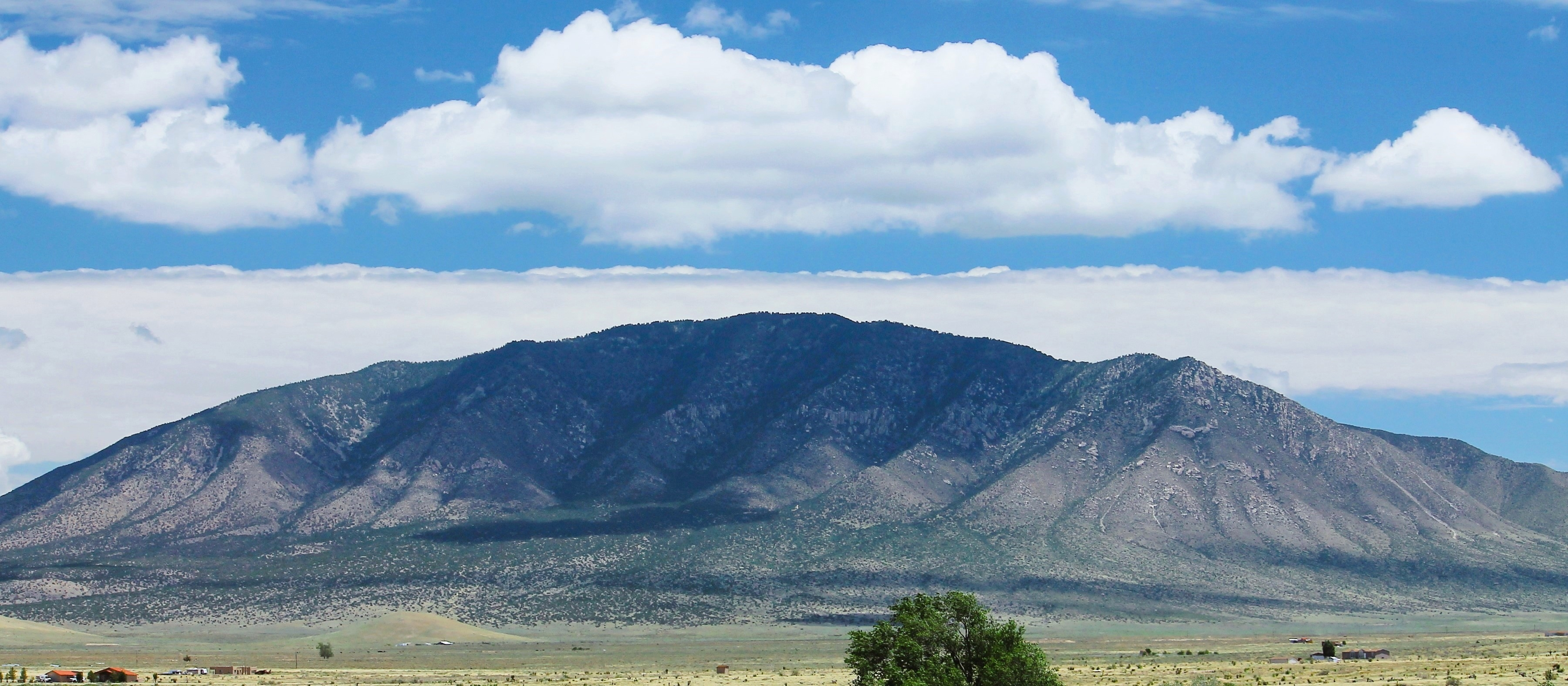
- West aspect

Highest point
- Elevation: 9,626 ft (2,934 m)
- Prominence: 2,633 ft (803 m)
- Parent peak: Nogal Peak
- Isolation: 14.18 mi (22.82 km)
- Coordinates: 33°41′26″N 105°43′42″W

Naming
- Etymology: Carrizo

Geography
- Location within New Mexico Location within the United States
- Country: United States
- State: New Mexico
- County: Lincoln
- Protected area: Lincoln National Forest
- Parent range: Sacramento Mountains
- Topo map: USGS White Oaks South

Geology
- Mountain type: Stock
- Rock type(s): Rhyolite, Quartz monzonite

Climbing
- Easiest route: trail class 1+

Carrizo Peak is a 9,626-foot-elevation (2,934-meter) mountain summit in Lincoln County, New Mexico, United States.

== Description ==
Carrizo Peak is a prominent mountain located nine miles (14 km) east-northeast of Carrizozo, New Mexico, and can be seen from highways 54 and 380. Topographic relief is significant as the summit rises 3,600 feet (1,097 meters) above surrounding terrain in 2.5 miles (4.0 km). Access to the summit is via the Carrizo Peak Trail which is 2.5 miles long. The nearest higher mountain is Nogal Peak, 13.67 miles (22.00 km) to the south-southwest. Precipitation runoff from the mountain drains into the Rio Grande watershed. This landform's toponym has been officially adopted by the United States Board on Geographic Names. Carrizo Peak is the highest point of Carrizo Mountain, and should not be confused with the Carrizo Mountains of Arizona.

== Climate ==
According to the Köppen climate classification system, Carrizo Peak is located in a cool semiarid climate zone (Köppen BSk). The summers are hot during the day, but the high altitude and low humidity mean that nights remain distinctly cool. Most rain falls in the summer from afternoon thunderstorms, and winter snow is common and sometimes heavy.

== See also ==
- Basin and Range Province
