= Cerecinos del Carrizal =

Coordinates: 41°41′N 5°39′W

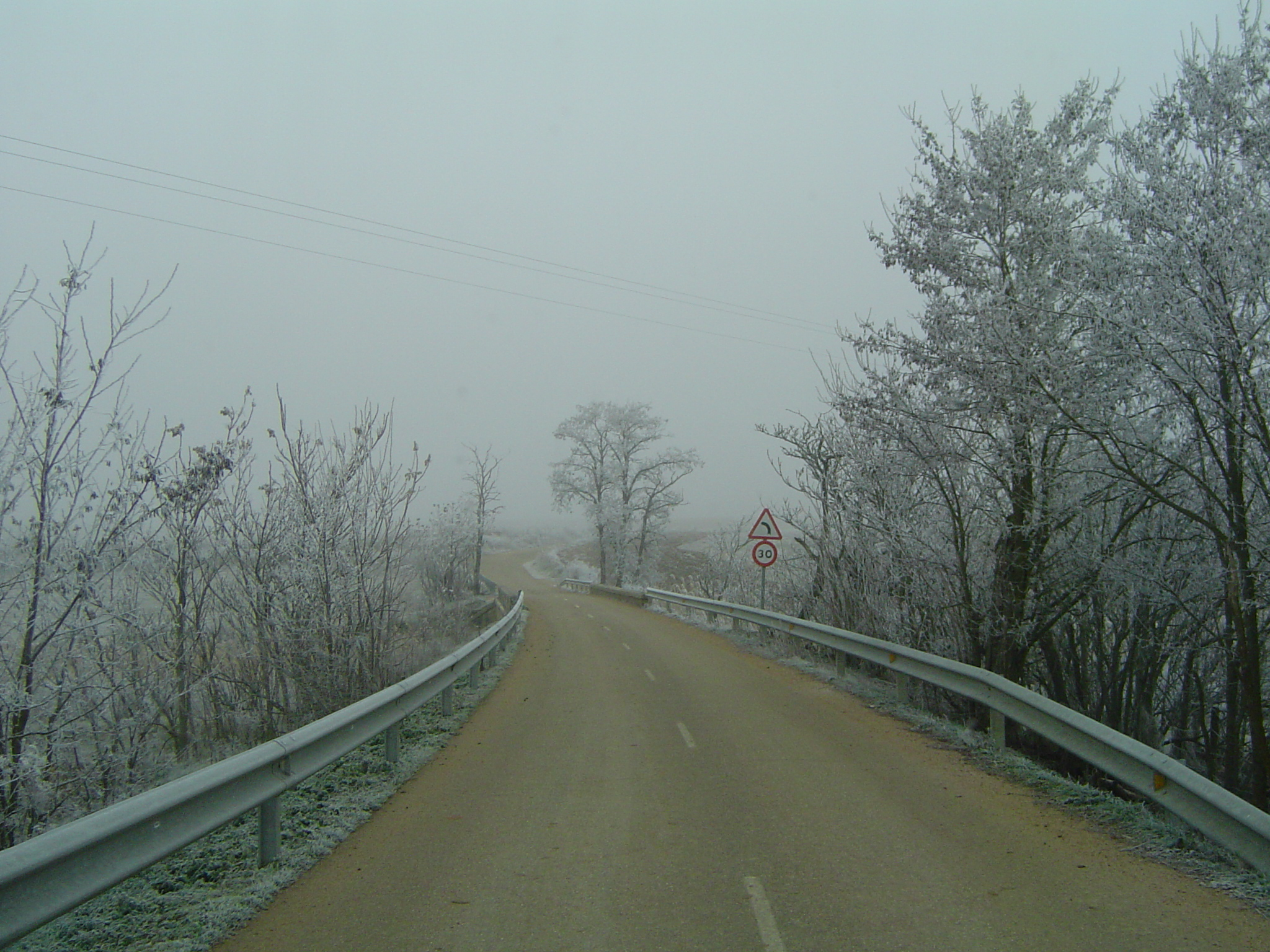

- Flag Coat of arms
- Interactive map of Cerecinos del Carrizal
- Country: Spain
- Autonomous community: Castile and León
- Province: Zamora
- Municipality: Cerecinos del Carrizal

Area
  - Total: 17 km^{2} (6.6 sq mi)

Population (2025-01-01)
  - Total: 111
  - Density: 6.5/km^{2} (17/sq mi)
- Time zone: UTC+1 (CET)
  - Summer (DST): UTC+2 (CEST)
- Climate: BSk

Cerecinos del Carrizal is a municipality located in the province of Zamora, Castile and León, Spain. According to the 2009 census (INE), the municipality has a population of 143 inhabitants.
