= Carrizo (plant) =

Carrizo ("reed") is the Spanish vernacular name of the following plants found in a carrizal ("reed bed"):

- Ammophila arenaria
- Arundo donax
- Elytrigia repens
- Phragmites australis
