= Black Mesa State Park =

State park in Oklahoma, United States

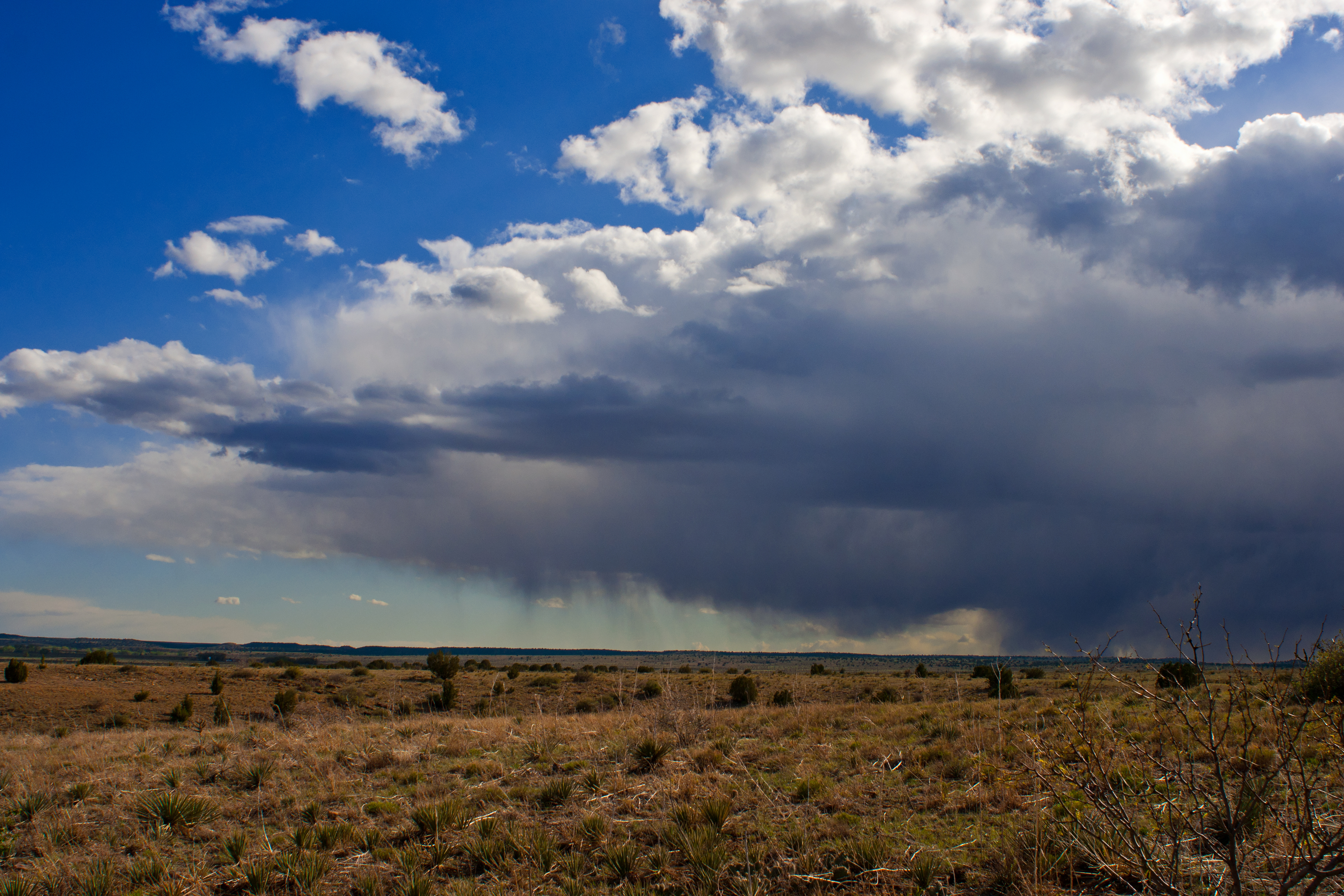
- Storm at Black Mesa State Park, April 2012

- Location within Oklahoma
- Location: Cimarron County, Oklahoma, United States
- Nearest city: Boise City, OK
- Coordinates: 36.8458550°N 102.8802025°W
- Area: 349 acres (141 ha)
- Governing body: Oklahoma Tourism and Recreation Department
- Website: www.travelok.com/listings/view.profile/id.631

Black Mesa State Park is an Oklahoma state park in Cimarron County, near the western border of the Oklahoma panhandle and New Mexico. The park is located about 15 miles (24 km) away from its namesake, Black Mesa, the highest point in Oklahoma (4,973 feet (1,516 m) above sea level). The mesa was named for the layer of black lava rock that coats it.

The associated nature preserve is open to hiking and contains 1,600 acres (6.5 km^{2}) and is home to 23 rare plants and 8 rare animal species.

The nearest community is Kenton, Oklahoma. The nearest town is Boise City, Oklahoma.

The park is the darkest sky for any state park site in Oklahoma; the site is a Bortle 1 zone, thus making the park a big attraction for astronomers to view the night sky.

== Lake Carl Etling ==
Lake Carl Etling, also called Carl Etling Lake, was formed in 1959 by a dam built on South Carrizo Creek and is contained within Black Mesa State Park. It has a surface area of 159 acres, a shoreline of 5 miles (8.0 km), and an average depth of 11 feet (3.4 m), with a maximum depth of 38 feet (12 m).
