= North Carrizo Creek =

Location
- Country: United States

Physical characteristics
- Source
  - location: Baca County, Colorado
  - coordinates: 37°05′22″N 103°01′24″W
  - elevation: 4,564 feet (1,391 m)
- Mouth
  - location: Cimarron County, Oklahoma
  - coordinates: 36°56′06″N 102°56′32″W
  - elevation: 4,262 feet (1,299 m)

Basin features
- Progression: Cimarron River—Arkansas—Mississippi

North Carrizo Creek forms in Baca County, Colorado at the confluence of East Carrizo Creek and West Carrizo Creek, at a point about 6 miles north of the Preston Monument, the tripoint of Colorado, Oklahoma and New Mexico. North Carrizo Creek then flows generally south-southeast into Oklahoma to join the Cimarron River northeast of Kenton, Oklahoma and near Black Mesa. The creek is about 12 miles (19 km) long in straight-line distance from its head to its mouth. Most of the land near the creek is privately owned, although a few tracts of land in Colorado are part of Comanche National Grassland. There are no towns and only a few ranches along or near the creek.

North Carrizo Creek flows through an area characterized by mesas and narrow valleys. The climate is semi-arid steppe, Bsk in the Köppen Classification. Vegetation is mostly grassland although pinyon and juniper woodland is found in canyons and on steep slopes. Precipitation in Kenton averages 17.15 in (436 mm) annually. July and August are the rainiest months. Elevations along the creek range from 4,262 ft (1,299 m) at its mouth to about 4,564 ft (1,391 m) at its source.

The creek has also been known as Carrizo Creek, Carrizozo Creek, Carrizzo Creek, and North Carrizozo Creek. (There is a Carrizozo Creek in the area, but it joins the Cimarron River to the west.) Carrizo means reed in Spanish.

== See also ==
- Carrizozo Creek
- Carrizo Creek (New Mexico/Texas)
- Carrizo Creek (Arizona)
- South Carrizo Creek
- West Carrizo Creek
