= Lake Carl Etling =

Lake in Oklahoma, United States

- Lake Carl G. Etling; Carl Etling Lake
- Location within Oklahoma Location within the United States
- Interactive map of Lake Carl Etling
- Location: Kenton, Oklahoma
- Coordinates: 36°50′54″N 102°52′31″W
- Type: Artificial lake
- Part of: Black Mesa State Park
- River sources: South Carrizo Creek
- Basin countries: United States
- Managing agency: Oklahoma Wildlife Department
- Built: 1958
- Surface area: 159 acres (64 ha)
- Average depth: 11 ft (3.4 m)
- Max. depth: 38 ft (12 m)
- Shore length^{1}: 5 mi (8.0 km)
- Surface elevation: 4,311 ft (1,314 m)
- ^{1} Shore length is not a well-defined measure.

Lake Carl Etling, elevation 4,311 feet (1,314 meters), also called Lake Carl G. Etling and Carl Etling Lake, is located southeast of Kenton, Oklahoma in Cimarron County, Oklahoma, inside Black Mesa State Park. Fed by South Carrizo Creek, it is 159 acres (64 ha) in size and has 5 mi (8.0 km) of shoreline. It has an average depth of 11 ft (3.4 m), with a maximum depth of 38 ft (12 m). The lake was constructed in 1958.

Operated by the Oklahoma Wildlife Department, it is stocked with largemouth bass, flathead catfish, walleye, and smallmouth bass. Boat ramps are located on the east and south sides of the lake, but water sport activities are not allowed. Camping facilities are available within the Park.
