= Rita Blanca Creek =

Coordinates: 35.6621°N 102.4825°W

Location
- Country: United States

Physical characteristics
- Source
  - location: Texas

Rita Blanca Creek, also known as Mustang Creek, begins at the confluence of East Rita Blanca Creek and West Rita Blanca Creek southeast of Texline. Rita Blanca Creek then continues about sixty-two miles generally southeast to flow into Punta de Agua Creek.

== See also ==
- List of rivers of Texas
