= Grenville, New Mexico =

- Village
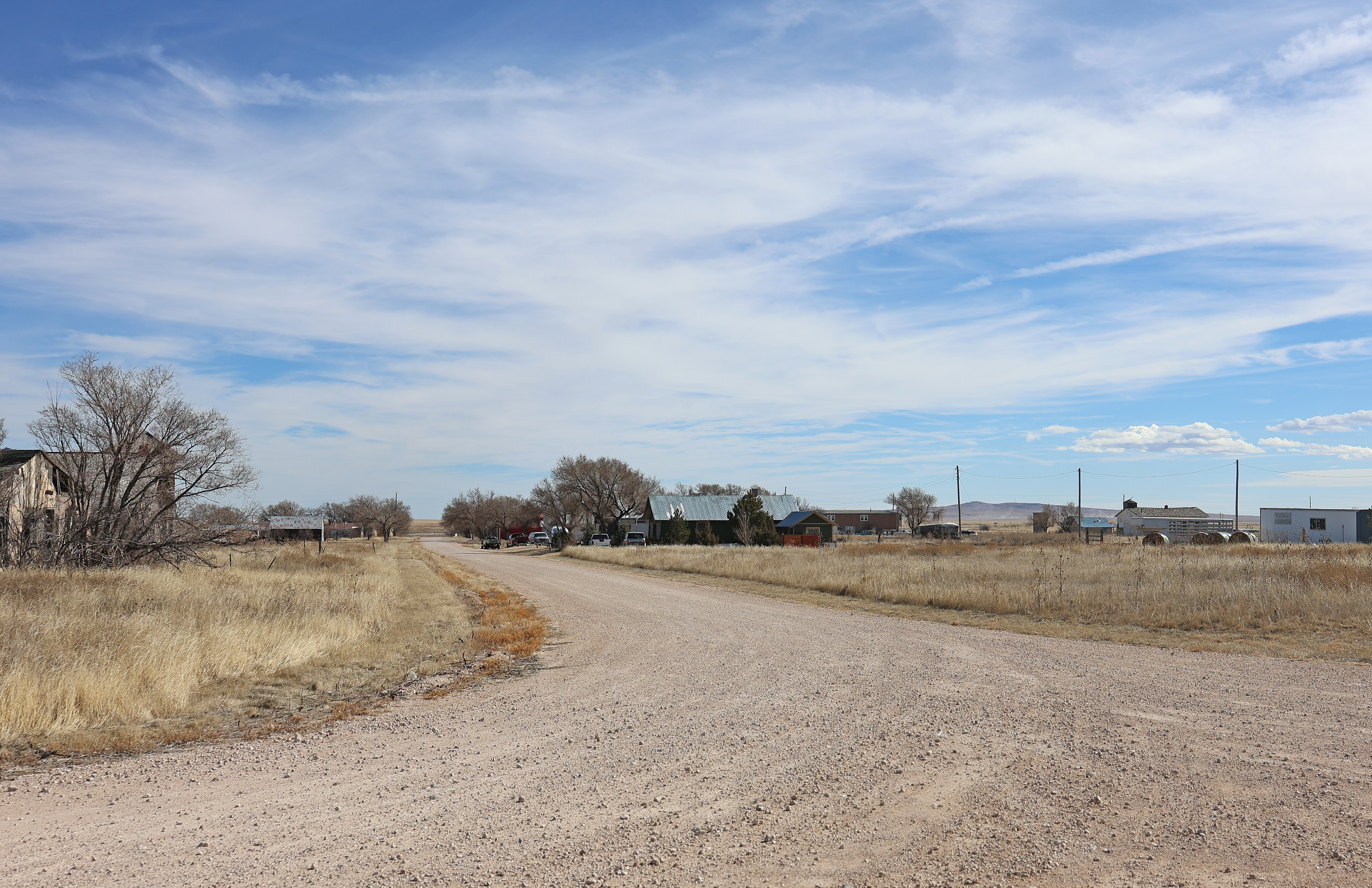
- Main Street in Grenville

- Location of Grenville, New Mexico

- Location in the United States
- Coordinates: 36°35′26″N 103°36′52″W
- Country: United States
- State: New Mexico
- County: Union

Area
  - Total: 0.38 sq mi (0.98 km^{2})
  - Land: 0.38 sq mi (0.98 km^{2})
  - Water: 0 sq mi (0.00 km^{2})
- Elevation: 5,971 ft (1,820 m)

Population (2020)
  - Total: 22
  - Density: 58.1/sq mi (22.43/km^{2})
- Time zone: UTC-7 (Mountain (MST))
  - Summer (DST): UTC-6 (MDT)
- ZIP code: 88424
- Area code: 575
- FIPS code: 35-30770
- GNIS feature ID: 2413556

Grenville is a village in Union County, New Mexico, United States. As of the 2020 census, Grenville had a population of 22.

== Geography ==
According to the United States Census Bureau, the village has a total area of 0.6 square miles (1.6 km^{2}), all land.

=== Climate ===
Climate data for Grenville, New Mexico (1991–2020 normals, extremes 1940–2022)
| Month | Jan | Feb | Mar | Apr | May | Jun | Jul | Aug | Sep | Oct | Nov | Dec | Year |
|---|---|---|---|---|---|---|---|---|---|---|---|---|---|
| Record high °F (°C) | 77 (25) | 77 (25) | 82 (28) | 88 (31) | 99 (37) | 104 (40) | 100 (38) | 100 (38) | 100 (38) | 91 (33) | 82 (28) | 76 (24) | 104 (40) |
| Mean daily maximum °F (°C) | 47.0 (8.3) | 49.9 (9.9) | 58.1 (14.5) | 65.1 (18.4) | 73.8 (23.2) | 83.3 (28.5) | 86.4 (30.2) | 83.6 (28.7) | 78.1 (25.6) | 67.6 (19.8) | 56.2 (13.4) | 46.7 (8.2) | 66.3 (19.1) |
| Daily mean °F (°C) | 33.5 (0.8) | 35.5 (1.9) | 42.9 (6.1) | 49.6 (9.8) | 58.7 (14.8) | 68.2 (20.1) | 72.1 (22.3) | 70.1 (21.2) | 63.9 (17.7) | 52.9 (11.6) | 41.8 (5.4) | 33.5 (0.8) | 51.9 (11.0) |
| Mean daily minimum °F (°C) | 19.9 (−6.7) | 21.0 (−6.1) | 27.7 (−2.4) | 34.1 (1.2) | 43.5 (6.4) | 53.1 (11.7) | 57.7 (14.3) | 56.6 (13.7) | 49.8 (9.9) | 38.2 (3.4) | 27.4 (−2.6) | 20.2 (−6.6) | 37.4 (3.0) |
| Record low °F (°C) | −26 (−32) | −24 (−31) | −15 (−26) | 6 (−14) | 19 (−7) | 31 (−1) | 41 (5) | 38 (3) | 19 (−7) | 2 (−17) | −20 (−29) | −15 (−26) | −26 (−32) |
| Average precipitation inches (mm) | 0.38 (9.7) | 0.40 (10) | 0.80 (20) | 1.07 (27) | 1.65 (42) | 1.88 (48) | 3.64 (92) | 3.15 (80) | 1.77 (45) | 0.99 (25) | 0.41 (10) | 0.46 (12) | 16.60 (422) |
| Average snowfall inches (cm) | 3.2 (8.1) | 3.3 (8.4) | 2.1 (5.3) | 1.3 (3.3) | 0.0 (0.0) | 0.0 (0.0) | 0.0 (0.0) | 0.0 (0.0) | 0.0 (0.0) | 0.7 (1.8) | 2.2 (5.6) | 5.1 (13) | 17.9 (45.5) |
| Average precipitation days (≥ 0.01 in) | 2.4 | 2.4 | 3.3 | 4.7 | 6.0 | 6.8 | 9.1 | 8.9 | 4.8 | 2.9 | 2.7 | 2.4 | 56.4 |
| Average snowy days (≥ 0.1 in) | 1.7 | 1.5 | 0.8 | 0.5 | 0.0 | 0.0 | 0.0 | 0.0 | 0.0 | 0.3 | 1.0 | 1.5 | 7.3 |
Source 1: NOAA
Source 2: xmACIS2

== Demographics ==
Historical population
| Census | Pop. | Note | %± |
|---|---|---|---|
| 1930 | 231 | | — |
| 1940 | 143 | | −38.1% |
| 1950 | 102 | | −28.7% |
| 1960 | 55 | | −46.1% |
| 1970 | 21 | | −61.8% |
| 1980 | 39 | | 85.7% |
| 1990 | 24 | | −38.5% |
| 2000 | 25 | | 4.2% |
| 2010 | 38 | | 52.0% |
| 2020 | 22 | | −42.1% |
U.S. Decennial Census

As of the census of 2000, there were 25 people, 9 households, and 6 families residing in the village. The population density was 39.8 inhabitants per square mile (15.4/km^{2}). There were 14 housing units at an average density of 22.3 units per square mile (8.6 units/km^{2}). The racial makeup of the village was 100.00% White.

There were 9 households, out of which 33.3% had children under the age of 18 living with them, 66.7% were married couples living together, and 33.3% were non-families. 33.3% of all households were made up of individuals, and 33.3% had someone living alone who was 65 years of age or older. The average household size was 2.78 and the average family size was 3.67.

In the village, the population was spread out, with 32.0% under the age of 18, 4.0% from 18 to 24, 20.0% from 25 to 44, 16.0% from 45 to 64, and 28.0% who were 65 years of age or older. The median age was 40 years. For every 100 females, there were 108.3 males. For every 100 females age 18 and over, there were 70.0 males.

The median income for a household in the village was $54,375, and the median income for a family was $58,125. Males had a median income of $0 versus $0 for females. The per capita income for the village was $21,536. None of the population and none of the families were below the poverty line.
