= Kim, Colorado =

Town in Colorado, United States

- Town
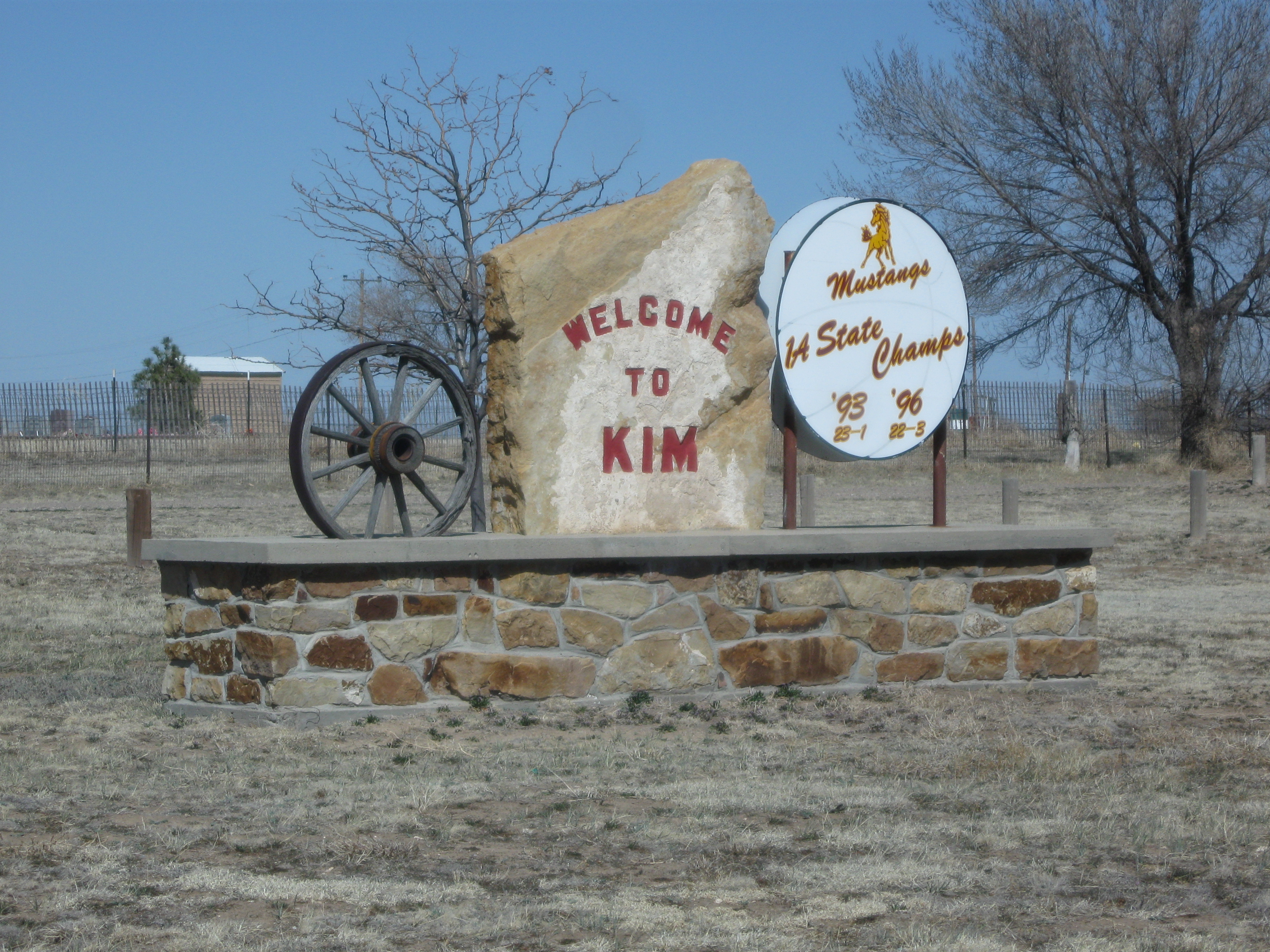
- Welcome Sign (2009)

- Location within Las Animas County and Colorado
- Coordinates: 37°14′58″N 103°21′12″W
- Country: United States
- State: Colorado
- County: Las Animas County
- Incorporated (town): 1974

Government
  - Type: Statutory Town

Area
  - Total: 0.38 sq mi (0.98 km^{2})
  - Land: 0.38 sq mi (0.98 km^{2})
  - Water: 0 sq mi (0.00 km^{2})
- Elevation: 5,702 ft (1,738 m)

Population (2020)
  - Total: 63
  - Density: 170/sq mi (64/km^{2})
- Time zone: UTC-7 (MST)
  - Summer (DST): UTC-6 (MDT)
- ZIP code: 81049
- Area code: 719
- GNIS feature ID: 2412834
- FIPS code: 08-40570

Kim is a Statutory Town in Las Animas County, Colorado, United States. The population was 63 at the time of the 2020 United States census.

The town was named after the novel Kim by Rudyard Kipling.

As of 2014, the town included a complete school system (grades K-12), a post office, and a general store.

== Geography ==
According to the United States Census Bureau, the town has a total area of 0.3 square miles (0.78 km^{2}), all of it land.

Kim is located on the plains of southeastern Colorado and the elevation is 5690 ft (1734 m).

=== Climate ===
Kim experiences a semi-arid climate with hot summers and cold winters. Due to its high elevation and aridity, temperatures drop sharply after sunset. While daytime summer temperatures often exceed 90 degrees, nights are cool. Spring and Fall are mild. During the winter, temperatures can drop below zero at night, but are usually above freezing during the day. Kim receives most of its precipitation in the spring and late summer. Snow falls several times each winter, but rarely exceeds a few inches. Most snow melts within a few days, even in December or January.

Climate data for Kim, Colorado, 1991–2020 normals, extremes 1988–present
Month	Jan	Feb	Mar	Apr	May	Jun	Jul	Aug	Sep	Oct	Nov	Dec	Year
Record high °F (°C)	77 (25)	81 (27)	94 (34)	90 (32)	96 (36)	103 (39)	101 (38)	100 (38)	98 (37)	92 (33)	84 (29)	77 (25)	103 (39)
Mean maximum °F (°C)	68.1 (20.1)	71.1 (21.7)	78.4 (25.8)	82.8 (28.2)	89.2 (31.8)	95.2 (35.1)	96.7 (35.9)	93.4 (34.1)	90.8 (32.7)	84.7 (29.3)	76.7 (24.8)	68.5 (20.3)	98.0 (36.7)
Mean daily maximum °F (°C)	49.6 (9.8)	52.6 (11.4)	60.2 (15.7)	66.7 (19.3)	76.1 (24.5)	85.1 (29.5)	89.1 (31.7)	86.4 (30.2)	80.1 (26.7)	69.4 (20.8)	58.4 (14.7)	49.5 (9.7)	68.6 (20.3)
Daily mean °F (°C)	35.4 (1.9)	38.1 (3.4)	45.3 (7.4)	52.0 (11.1)	61.6 (16.4)	70.8 (21.6)	75.0 (23.9)	72.8 (22.7)	65.7 (18.7)	54.2 (12.3)	43.6 (6.4)	35.9 (2.2)	54.2 (12.3)
Mean daily minimum °F (°C)	21.3 (−5.9)	23.5 (−4.7)	30.4 (−0.9)	37.2 (2.9)	47.2 (8.4)	56.5 (13.6)	60.9 (16.1)	59.2 (15.1)	51.4 (10.8)	38.7 (3.7)	28.7 (−1.8)	22.2 (−5.4)	39.8 (4.3)
Mean minimum °F (°C)	4.1 (−15.5)	6.4 (−14.2)	13.6 (−10.2)	22.2 (−5.4)	31.9 (−0.1)	43.3 (6.3)	51.0 (10.6)	50.1 (10.1)	37.1 (2.8)	23.4 (−4.8)	12.0 (−11.1)	4.7 (−15.2)	−0.6 (−18.1)
Record low °F (°C)	−17 (−27)	−17 (−27)	−2 (−19)	6 (−14)	23 (−5)	34 (1)	40 (4)	44 (7)	26 (−3)	3 (−16)	−10 (−23)	−17 (−27)	−17 (−27)
Average precipitation inches (mm)	0.36 (9.1)	0.36 (9.1)	0.92 (23)	1.37 (35)	1.92 (49)	2.05 (52)	2.80 (71)	2.89 (73)	1.52 (39)	0.89 (23)	0.48 (12)	0.52 (13)	16.08 (408.2)
Average snowfall inches (cm)	4.2 (11)	2.8 (7.1)	5.0 (13)	4.2 (11)	0.4 (1.0)	0.0 (0.0)	0.0 (0.0)	0.0 (0.0)	0.0 (0.0)	2.1 (5.3)	3.3 (8.4)	4.9 (12)	26.9 (68.8)
Average extreme snow depth inches (cm)	3.5 (8.9)	2.1 (5.3)	2.3 (5.8)	1.9 (4.8)	0.2 (0.51)	0.0 (0.0)	0.0 (0.0)	0.0 (0.0)	0.0 (0.0)	1.4 (3.6)	2.1 (5.3)	3.2 (8.1)	7.3 (19)
Average precipitation days (≥ 0.01 in)	3.1	3.1	4.3	5.8	6.8	6.6	8.8	8.3	4.7	3.2	2.9	3.3	60.9
Average snowy days (≥ 0.1 in)	2.2	2.0	2.1	1.3	0.2	0.0	0.0	0.0	0.0	0.6	1.6	2.3	12.3
Source 1: NOAA
Source 2: National Weather Service

== Demographics ==
Historical population
Census	Pop.	Note	%±
1980	100		—
1990	76		−24.0%
2000	65		−14.5%
2010	74		13.8%
2020	63		−14.9%
U.S. Decennial Census

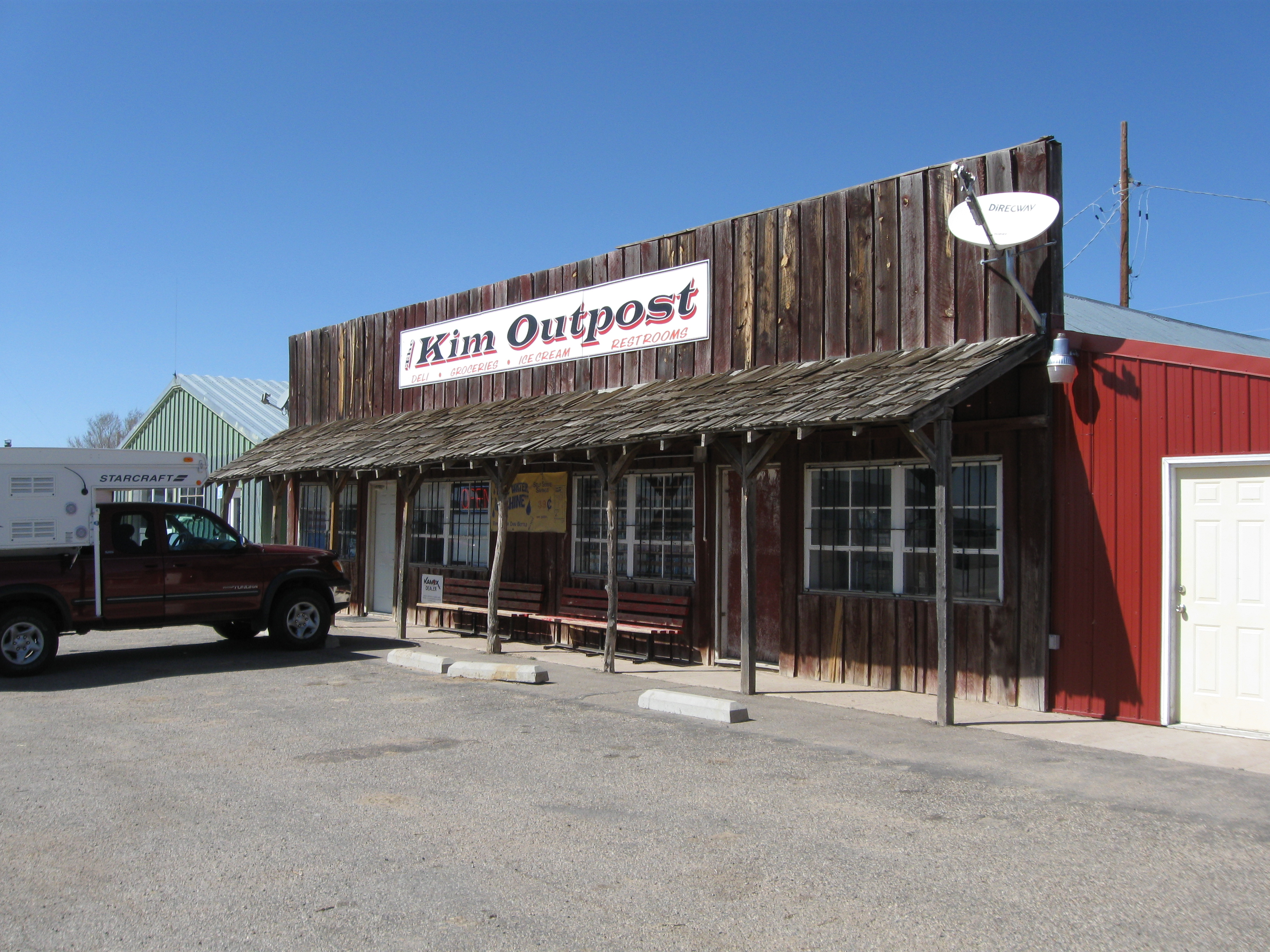
Kim Outpost (2009)

As of the census of 2000, there were 65 people, 38 households, and 15 families residing in the town. The population density was 211.3 inhabitants per square mile (81.6/km^{2}). There were 49 housing units at an average density of 159.3 per square mile (61.5/km^{2}). The racial makeup of the town was 98.46% White, and 1.54% from two or more races. Hispanic or Latino of any race were 15.38% of the population.

There were 38 households, out of which 15.8% had children under the age of 18 living with them, 36.8% were married couples living together, 2.6% had a female householder with no husband present, and 60.5% were non-families. 60.5% of all households were made up of individuals, and 15.8% had someone living alone who was 65 years of age or older. The average household size was 1.71 and the average family size was 2.80.

In the town, the population was spread out, with 16.9% under the age of 18, 3.1% from 18 to 24, 30.8% from 25 to 44, 30.8% from 45 to 64, and 18.5% who were 65 years of age or older. The median age was 44 years. For every 100 females, there were 124.1 males. For every 100 females age 18 and over, there were 107.7 males.

The median income for a household in the town was $25,938, and the median income for a family was $36,667. Males had a median income of $22,500 versus $27,000 for females. The per capita income for the town was $16,343. There were 11.1% of the families and 14.5% of the population living below the poverty line, including none under eighteen and 20.0% of those over 64.

== See also ==
- Colorado cities and towns
  - Colorado municipalities
