= Cimarron River (Arkansas River tributary) =

River in the United States

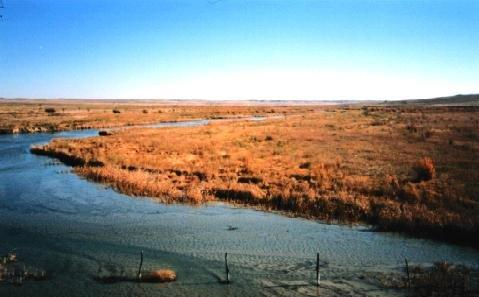
- The Cimarron River, near Forgan, Oklahoma

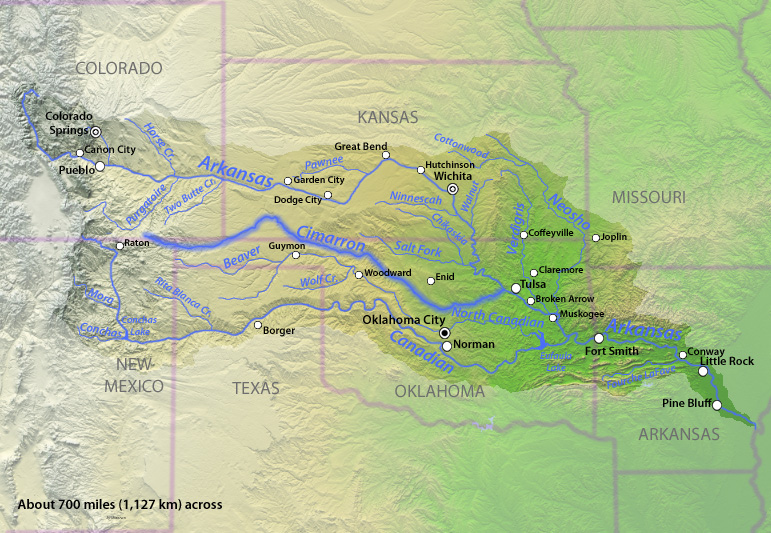
- Map of the Arkansas River basin with the Cimarron River highlighted
- Etymology: Río de los Carneros Cimarrones (Spanish for 'River of the Wild Sheep')
- Native name: Ñíxgu / Ñíhgu (Iowa-Oto); Hotóao'hé'e (Cheyenne)

Location
- Country: United States
- State: Colorado, Kansas, New Mexico, Oklahoma
- Cities: Cushing, Oklahoma, Mannford, Oklahoma, Guthrie, Oklahoma

Physical characteristics
- Source: Confluence of Dry Cimarron River and Carrizozo Creek
  - location: Kenton, Cimarron County, Oklahoma
  - coordinates: 36°54′24″N 102°59′12″W
  - elevation: 4,318 ft (1,316 m)
- Mouth: Arkansas River
  - location: Keystone Lake, at Westport, Pawnee County, Oklahoma
  - coordinates: 36°10′14″N 96°16′19″W
  - elevation: 722 ft (220 m)
- Length: 698 mi (1,123 km)
- Basin size: 18,950 sq mi (49,100 km^{2})
- Discharge
  - location: Guthrie, Oklahoma, 65 miles (105 km) from the mouth
  - average: 1,163 cu ft/s (32.9 m^{3}/s)
  - minimum: 0.3 cu ft/s (0.0085 m^{3}/s)
  - maximum: 158,000 cu ft/s (4,500 m^{3}/s)

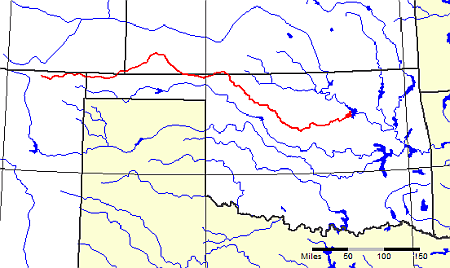
The Cimarron River (highlighted in red) flows through four states in the American West.

The Cimarron River (/ˈsɪmərɒn, -roʊn/ SIM-ə-ro(h)n; Iowa-Oto: Ñíxgu or Ñíhgu, meaning "Salt River"; Cheyenne: Hotóao'hé'e) extends 698 miles (1,123 km) across New Mexico, Oklahoma, Colorado, and Kansas. The headwaters flow from Johnson Mesa west of Folsom in northeastern New Mexico. Much of the river's length lies in Oklahoma, where it either borders or passes through 11 counties. No major cities are along its route. The river enters the Oklahoma Panhandle near Kenton, crosses the corner of southeastern Colorado into Kansas, re-enters the Oklahoma Panhandle, re-enters Kansas, and finally returns to Oklahoma, where it joins the Arkansas River at Keystone Reservoir west of Tulsa, its only impoundment. The drainage basin encompasses about 18,927 square miles (49,020 km^{2}).

== Etymology ==
The river's present name comes from the early Spanish name, Río de los Carneros Cimarrones, which is usually translated as River of the Wild Sheep; previous English names for the river include Grand Saline, Jefferson (in John Melish's 1820 U.S. map), Red Fork, and Salt Fork.

== Description ==
In northeastern New Mexico and far western Oklahoma, the headwater area is known as the Dry Cimarron River because another Cimarron River (Canadian River tributary) that runs wholly in New Mexico has its headwaters nearby in the Sangre de Cristo Mountains. The name is related to the river not being completely dry, but sometimes its water entirely disappears under the sand in the riverbed. The Dry Cimarron Scenic Byway follows the river from Folsom to the Oklahoma border. The waterway becomes the Cimarron River at its confluence with Carrizozo Creek just inside the Oklahoma border, west of Kenton.

In Oklahoma, it is joined by North Carrizo Creek north-northeast of Kenton, Tesesquite Creek east of Kenton, and South Carrizo Creek further east. Tributaries include Cold Springs Creek, Ute Canyon Creek, and Flagg Springs Creek before crossing into Kansas. The river flows along the southern edges of Black Mesa, Oklahoma's highest point. As it first crosses the Kansas border, the river flows through the Cimarron National Grassland.

At Guthrie, the river is joined by Cottonwood Creek at a site known for frequent flooding. The Cimarron's water quality is rated as poor because the river flows through natural mineral deposits, salt plains, and saline springs, where it dissolves large amounts of minerals. It also collects quantities of red soil, which it carries to its terminus. Before the Keystone Dam was built, this silt was sufficient to discolor the Arkansas River downstream.

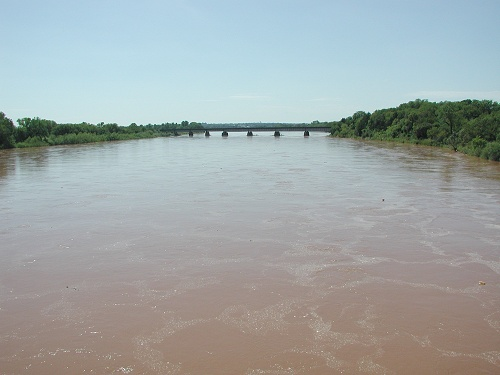
Cimarron River near Guthrie, Oklahoma at flood stage, photo provided by National Weather Service

== History ==
=== Early explorers ===
The first Europeans to see the Cimarron River were apparently Spanish conquistadores led by Francisco Vásquez de Coronado in 1541. The Spanish seem to have done little to exploit the area. The Osage tribe claimed most of the territory west of the confluence of the Cimarron and the Arkansas. In 1819, Thomas Nuttall explored the lower Cimarron and wrote a report describing the flora and fauna that he found there.

In 1821, Mexico threw off Spanish rule, and William Becknell opened the Santa Fe Trail. One branch of the Santa Fe Trail, known variously as the Cimarron Route, the Cimarron Cutoff, and the Middle Crossing (of the Arkansas River), ran through the Cimarron Desert and then along the Cimarron River. Lower Cimarron Spring on the riverbank was an important watering and camping spot. In 1831, Comanches killed Jedediah Smith (a famous hunter, trapper, and explorer) on the Santa Fe Trail near the Cimarron River. His body was never recovered.

In 1834, General Henry Leavenworth established Camp Arbuckle (Fort Arbuckle) at the mouth of the river. Later known as Old Fort Arbuckle, it was active for about a year, and its former site is now submerged beneath the Arkansas River. It should not be confused with the later Fort Arbuckle in Garvin County, Oklahoma. (Note: See History section in Tulsa County, Oklahoma for further explanation of the creation of Old Fort Arbuckle.)

Historic sites along the river include the ruins of Camp Nichols, a stone fort Kit Carson built in 1865 to protect travelers from raids by Plains Indians on the Cimarron Cutoff. It was near present-day Wheeless, Oklahoma. (Note: Wheeless is at the extreme western end of the Oklahoma Panhandle.) The old Chisholm Trail crossed the river at Red Fork Station near present-day Dover, Oklahoma. In the 1890s, the Creek Nation Cave along the river near Ingalls was a hideout for the Doolin gang, which included the teenaged bandits Cattle Annie and Little Britches.

On September 18, 1906, a bridge across the Cimarron near Dover collapsed beneath a Rock Island train bound for Fort Worth, Texas, from Chicago. The bridge was a temporary structure unable to withstand the pressure of debris and high water. The railroad had delayed replacing it with a permanent structure for financial reasons. Several sources report that over 100 people were killed, but the figure is disputed. The true number may be as low as four.

== See also ==
- List of rivers of Colorado
- List of rivers of Kansas
- List of rivers of New Mexico
- List of rivers of Oklahoma
- List of longest rivers of the United States (by main stem)
- Folsom Falls
- Maxwell National Wildlife Refuge
- Point of Rocks (Kansas)
