= Kenton, Oklahoma =

Unincorporated community in Oklahoma, US

- Census-designated place
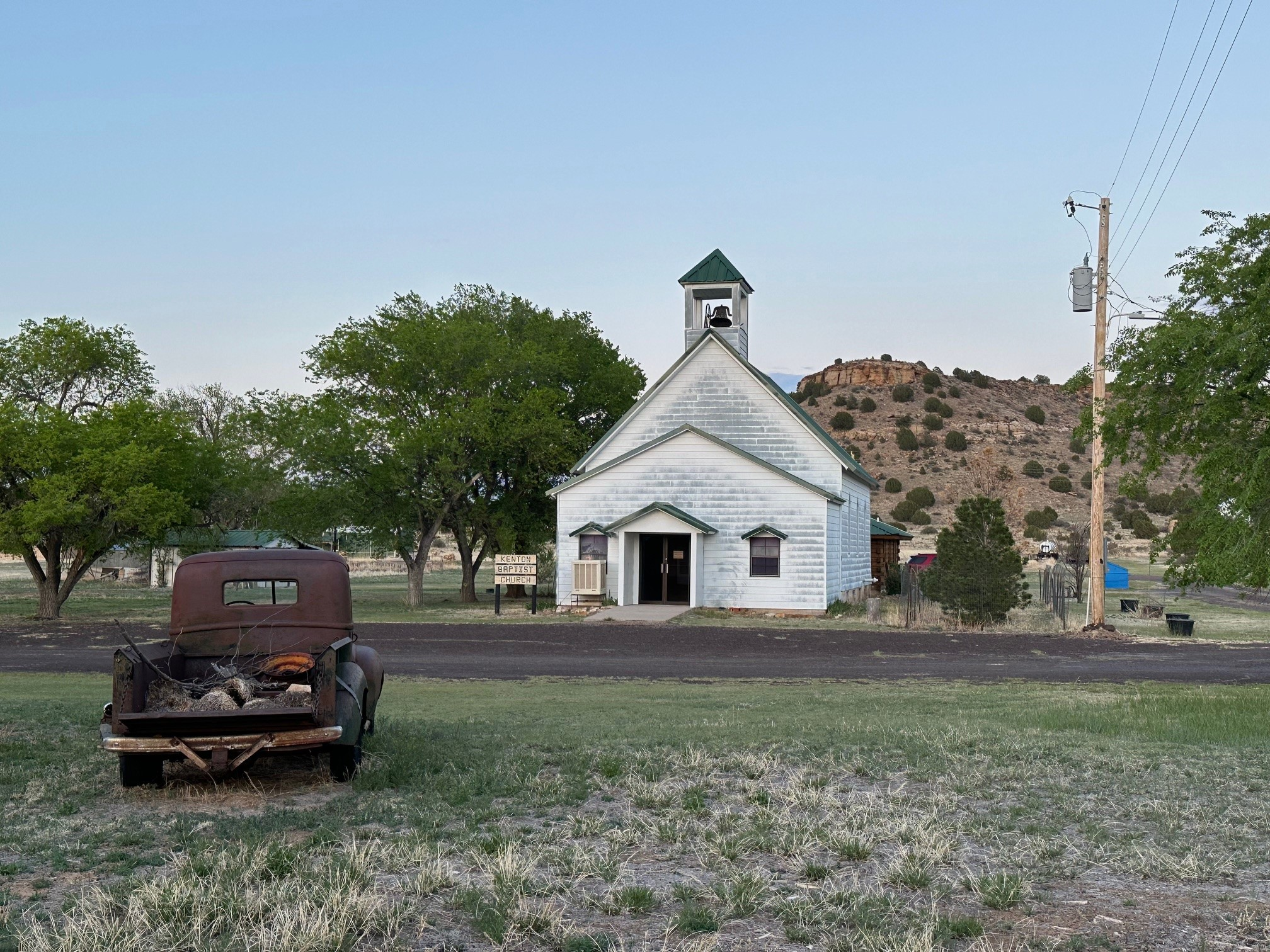
- Church in Kenton, April 2024

- Location in Cimarron County, Oklahoma

- Location in the United States
- Coordinates: 36°54′11″N 102°57′48″W
- Country: United States
- State: Oklahoma
- County: Cimarron

Area
  - Total: 0.71 sq mi (1.85 km^{2})
  - Land: 0.71 sq mi (1.85 km^{2})
  - Water: 0 sq mi (0.00 km^{2})
- Elevation: 4,350 ft (1,326 m)

Population (2020)
  - Total: 31
  - Density: 43.4/sq mi (16.74/km^{2})
- Time zone: UTC-7 (Mountain (MST))
  - Summer (DST): UTC-6 (MDT)
- ZIP codes: 73946
- Area code: 580
- FIPS code: 40-39400
- GNIS feature ID: 1094330
- Website: www.travelok.com/Kenton

Kenton is a census-designated place (CDP) in Cimarron County, Oklahoma, United States. As of the 2020 census, the community had 31 residents.

Kenton, which lies in the Cimarron River valley, is just south of Black Mesa, the highest point in Oklahoma, and serves as an unofficial staging point for visitors to the site. The east end of the mesa features dinosaur tracks which have been preserved in a sandstone strata next to Carrizo Creek. Black Mesa State Park, which contains Lake Carl Etling, is to the southeast. The Preston Monument, at the tripoint of Colorado, New Mexico and Oklahoma, is about 10 driving miles (16 km) north-northwest. Kenton is the closest settlement to Carrizo Canyon, about 22 miles (35 km) north inside Colorado, which is a small gorge in the Comanche National Grassland graced by juniper and cottonwood trees in which American Indian petroglyphs can be found along the walls.

== History ==
The post office for a place named Carrizo was opened September 9, 1886, with the name changed to Florence on April 9, 1890, the location being just over the line in New Mexico. It was, along with a place called Mineral, one of only two significant settlements in the area of the pre-statehood Oklahoma Panhandle. When a nephew of P.T. Barnum by the name of Fairchild B. Drew became postmaster of the place, he moved the post office a bit to the east and changed the name to Kenton in 1893. At the time Oklahoma became a state (on November 16, 1907), it served as the temporary county seat for Cimarron County. The building now known as "The Merc" served as the temporary courthouse and held the county records. The citizens of the county voted to move the seat on June 11, 1908, to Boise City. Kentonites did not want to give up the records, so a group of people from Boise City confiscated the documents before the end of a 30-day waiting period. This started a local legend that Boise City stole the courthouse.

During its heyday, Kenton had two car dealerships, a motel, a bank, and two general stores.

Despite threats of closure over the years, the post office in Kenton remains open.

=== Time zone ===
Kenton is the only Oklahoma community that observes (albeit informally) Mountain Time, reportedly because most of the people who interact with the town are from New Mexico or Colorado. This is despite the fact that officially, the time zone only changes west of the Oklahoma/New Mexico state line. To avoid confusion, "Mountain Time" is often added when giving the time to visitors. Posted business hours all end with "MT" or "MST" to specify Mountain Time.

=== Museum ===
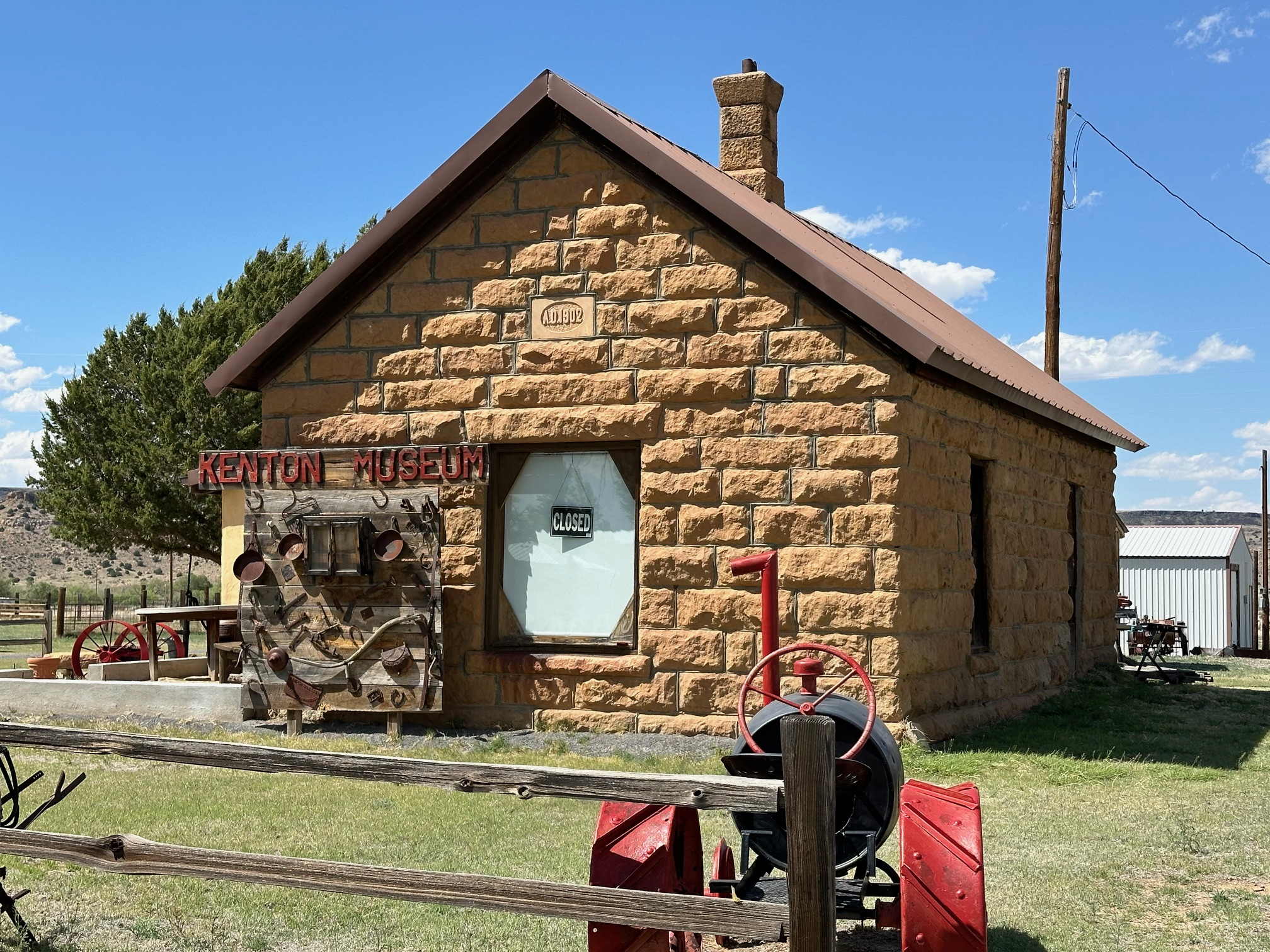
The Kenton Museum in April 2024

The town is home to the Kenton Museum, which is housed in a 1902 native rock former residence. The varied collection includes artifacts that helped settle No Man's Land, and other period photos and antiques.

== Geography ==
Kenton lies in the northwest corner of Cimarron County, approximately 3 miles (5 km) east of the New Mexico state line and 6 miles (10 km) south of the Colorado state line. It is located on the south side of the Cimarron River in the Cimarron River valley.

State Highway 325 serves the community.

Kenton experiences a semi-arid climate (Köppen BSk) with cool, dry winters and very hot, wetter summers.

Climate data for Kenton, Oklahoma (Elevation 4,330ft)
Month	Jan	Feb	Mar	Apr	May	Jun	Jul	Aug	Sep	Oct	Nov	Dec	Year
Record high °F (°C)	83 (28)	86 (30)	89 (32)	97 (36)	102 (39)	109 (43)	108 (42)	108 (42)	107 (42)	99 (37)	89 (32)	84 (29)	109 (43)
Mean daily maximum °F (°C)	50.4 (10.2)	55.1 (12.8)	62.3 (16.8)	70.3 (21.3)	78.8 (26.0)	88.6 (31.4)	92.6 (33.7)	89.9 (32.2)	83.8 (28.8)	73.5 (23.1)	59.7 (15.4)	51.3 (10.7)	71.4 (21.9)
Mean daily minimum °F (°C)	19.7 (−6.8)	23.8 (−4.6)	31.0 (−0.6)	38.7 (3.7)	48.5 (9.2)	57.8 (14.3)	63.1 (17.3)	61.5 (16.4)	53.7 (12.1)	40.6 (4.8)	29.0 (−1.7)	21.6 (−5.8)	40.8 (4.9)
Record low °F (°C)	−23 (−31)	−19 (−28)	−18 (−28)	13 (−11)	27 (−3)	39 (4)	47 (8)	44 (7)	27 (−3)	6 (−14)	−15 (−26)	−17 (−27)	−23 (−31)
Average precipitation inches (mm)	0.40 (10)	0.33 (8.4)	0.96 (24)	1.48 (38)	2.47 (63)	2.18 (55)	3.10 (79)	2.67 (68)	1.58 (40)	0.99 (25)	0.67 (17)	0.35 (8.9)	17.18 (436.3)
Average snowfall inches (cm)	4.9 (12)	3.6 (9.1)	6.4 (16)	1.3 (3.3)	0.2 (0.51)	0 (0)	0 (0)	0 (0)	0.2 (0.51)	0.5 (1.3)	2.8 (7.1)	4.1 (10)	24 (59.82)
Source: NOAA http://cdo.ncdc.noaa.gov/climatenormals/clim20/ok/344766.pdf. Retrieved 20 February 2011.

== Demographics ==
=== 2020 census ===
As of the 2020 census, Kenton had a population of 31. The median age was 67.8 years. 0.0% of residents were under the age of 18 and 54.8% of residents were 65 years of age or older. For every 100 females there were 63.2 males, and for every 100 females age 18 and over there were 63.2 males age 18 and over.

0.0% of residents lived in urban areas, while 100.0% lived in rural areas.

There were 21 households in Kenton, of which 23.8% had children under the age of 18 living in them. Of all households, 38.1% were married-couple households, 28.6% were households with a male householder and no spouse or partner present, and 33.3% were households with a female householder and no spouse or partner present. About 57.2% of all households were made up of individuals and 38.1% had someone living alone who was 65 years of age or older.

There were 31 housing units, of which 32.3% were vacant. The homeowner vacancy rate was 0.0% and the rental vacancy rate was 0.0%.

Racial composition as of the 2020 census
Race	Number	Percent
White	31	100.0%
Black or African American	0	0.0%
American Indian and Alaska Native	0	0.0%
Asian	0	0.0%
Native Hawaiian and Other Pacific Islander	0	0.0%
Some other race	0	0.0%
Two or more races	0	0.0%
Hispanic or Latino (of any race)	0	0.0%

=== 2010 census ===
As of the 2010 United States census, there were 17 people, 9 households, and 6 families residing in the CDP. The racial makeup of the city was 100.0% White. Hispanic or Latino of any race were 11.8% of the population.

There were 9 households, out of which 11.1% had children under the age of 18 living with them, 66.7% were married couples living together, and 33.3% were non-families. 33.3% of all households were made up of individuals, and 11.1% had someone living alone who was 65 years of age or older. The average household size was 1.89 and the average family size was 2.33.

In the CDP the population was spread out, with 11.8% under the age of 18, 0.0% from 18 to 24, 17.6% from 25 to 44, 29.4% from 45 to 64, and 41.2% who were 65 years of age or older. The median age was 58.8 years. For every 100 females there were 88.9 males. For every 100 females age 18 and over, there were 87.5 males.

=== 2013 American Community Survey ===
According to the 2013 American Community Survey, the median income for a household in the CDP was $18,750, and the median income for a family could not be computed because there were not enough sample observations. Median income for males and females could not be computed because there were not enough sample observations. The per capita income for the CDP was $8,320. About 41.7% of families and 68.3% of the population were below the poverty line, including 100.0% of those under age 18. The percentage of those age 65 or over living in poverty could not be computed because there were not enough sample observations.

== Education ==
The school district is Boise City Public Schools.

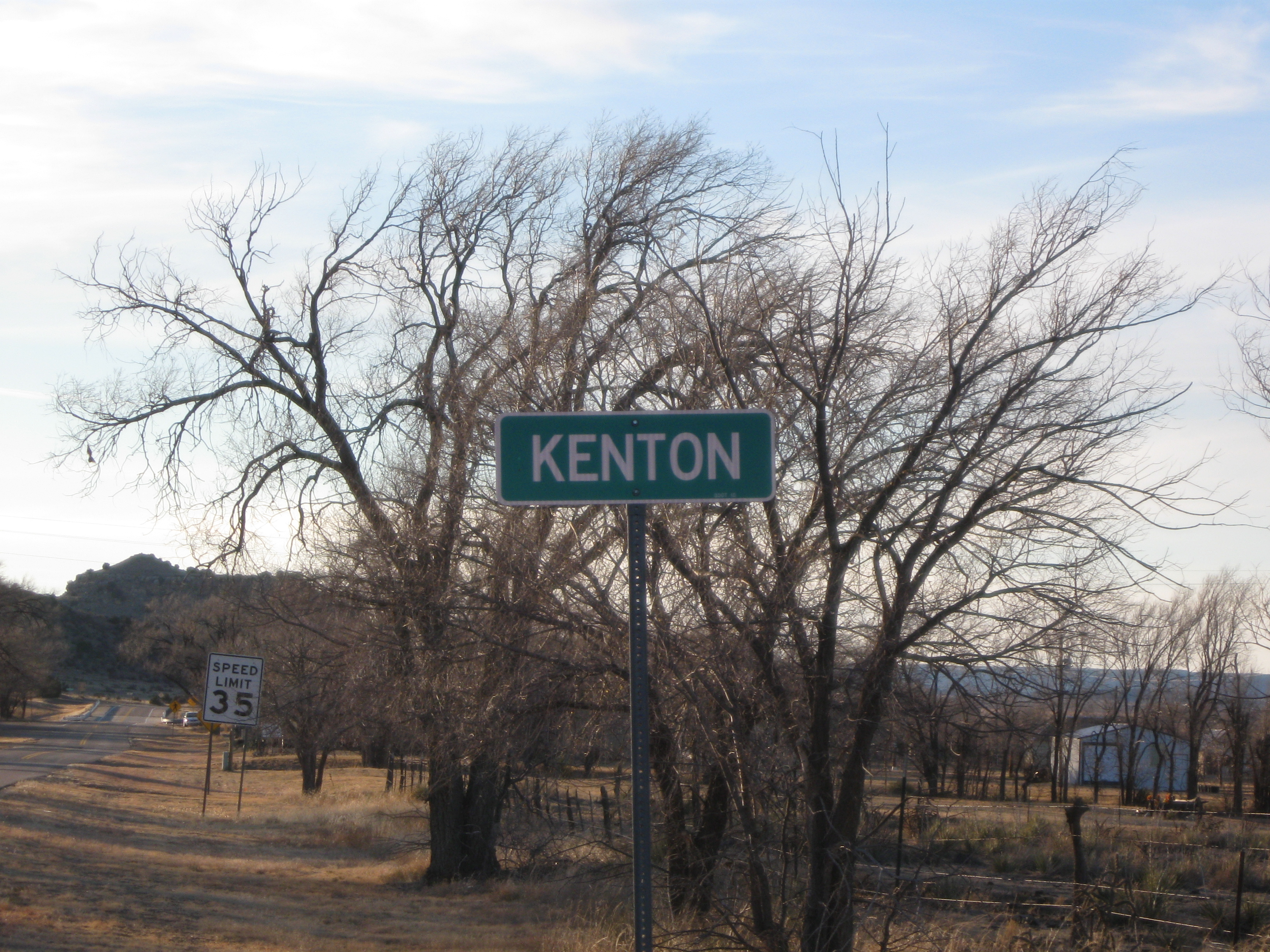
Kenton road sign, November 2011

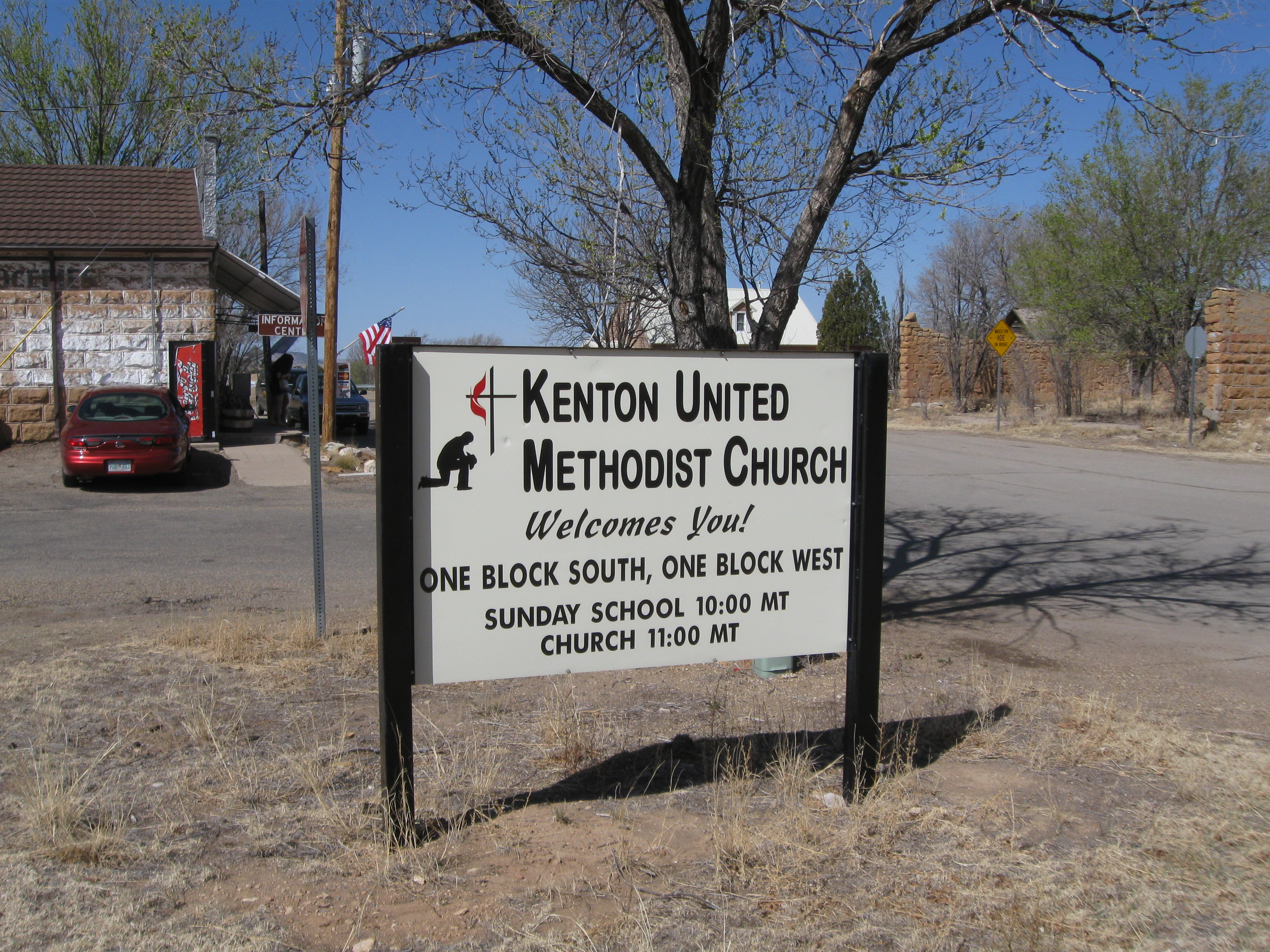
Sign in Kenton showing Mountain Time, March 2009

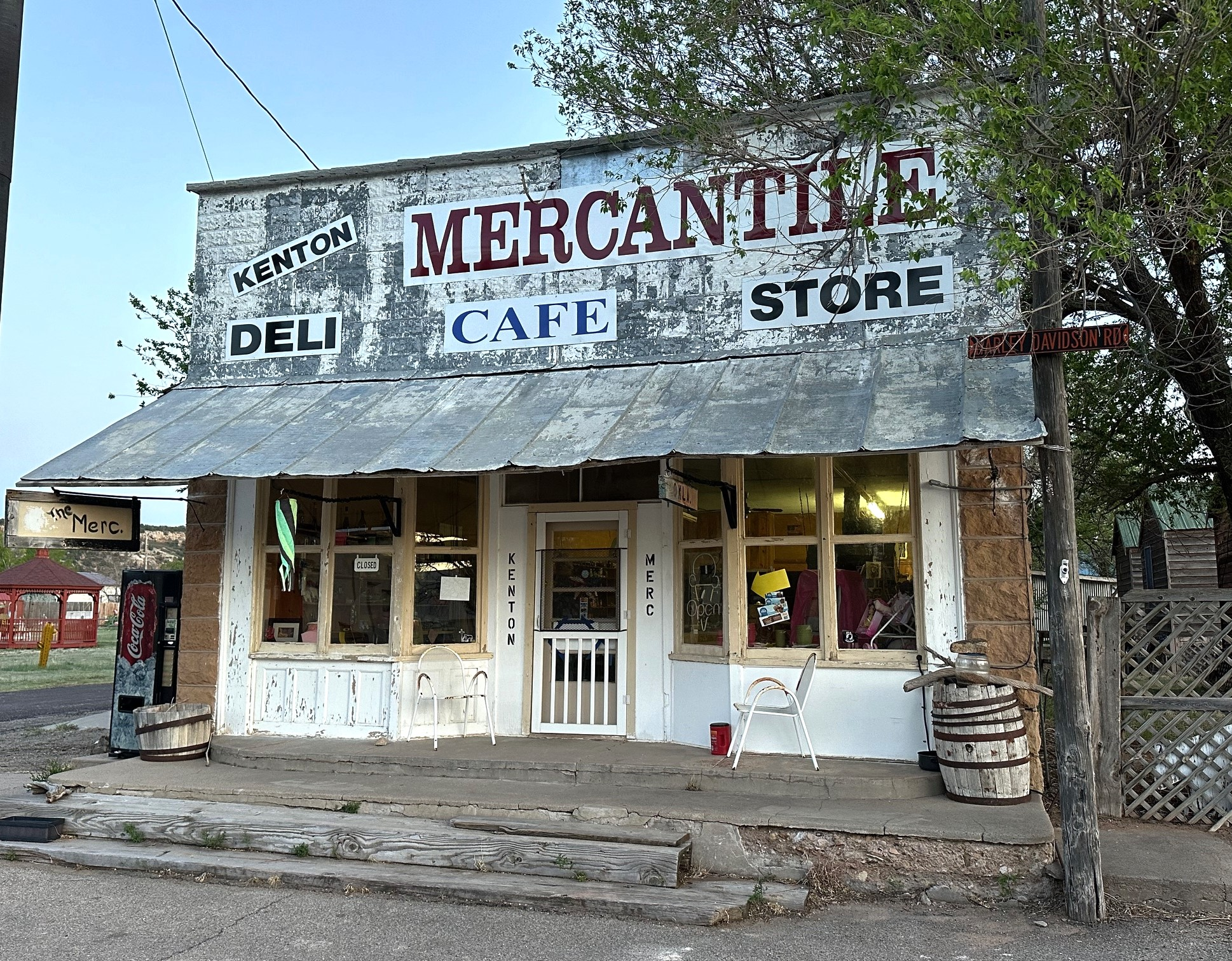
The Merc in April 2024

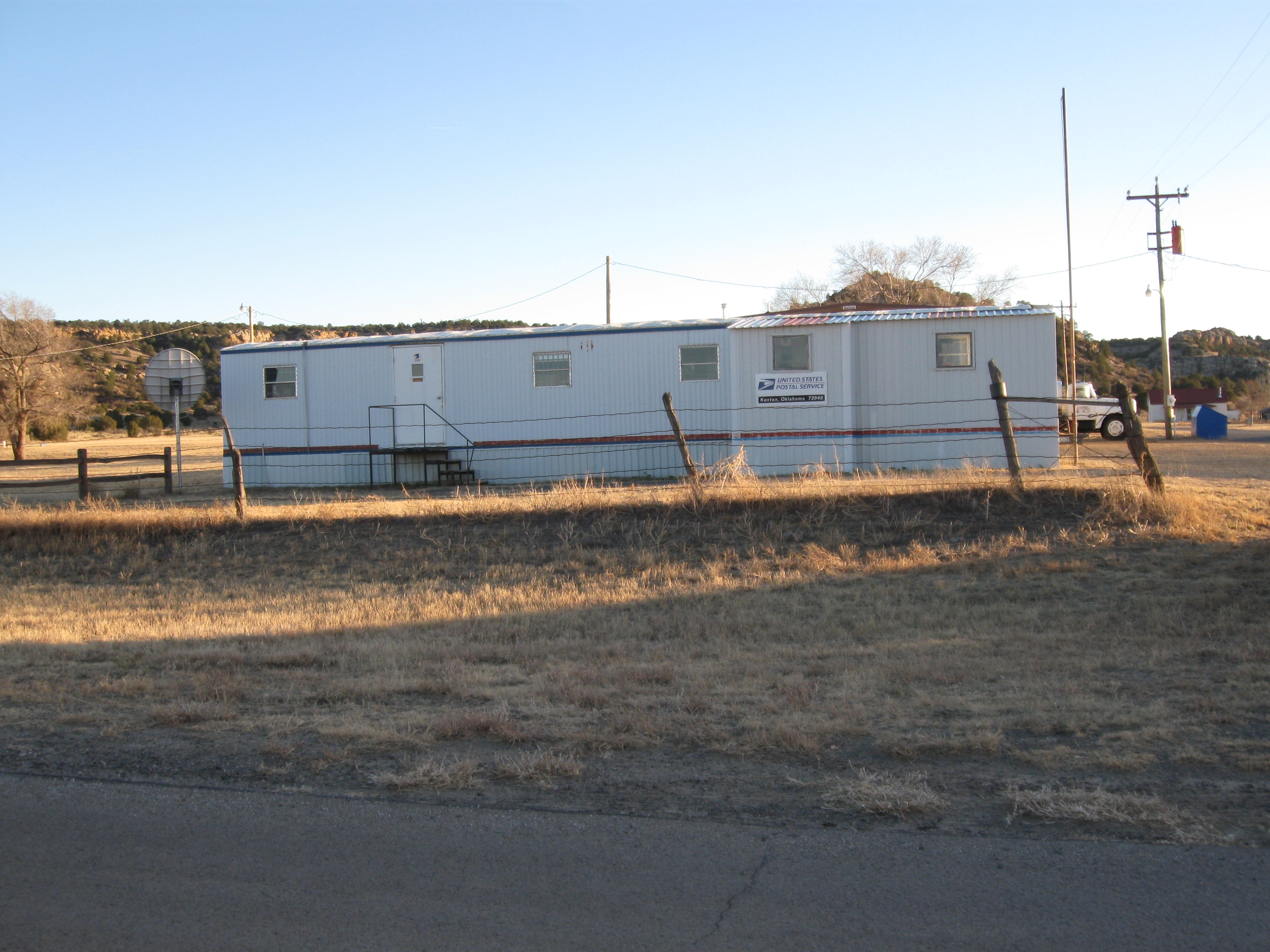
Kenton post office, November 2011

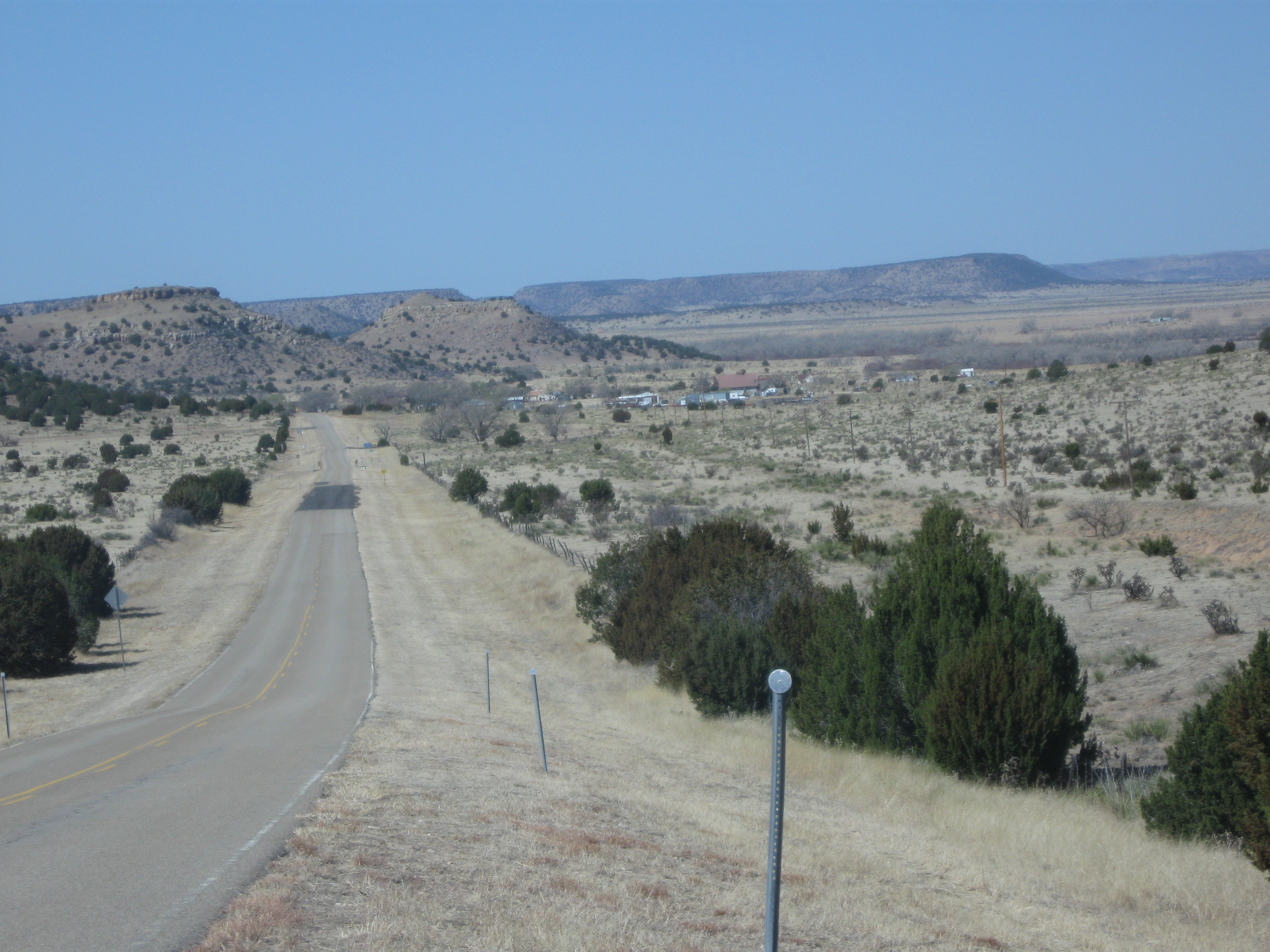
Kenton, Oklahoma, looking west, March 2009

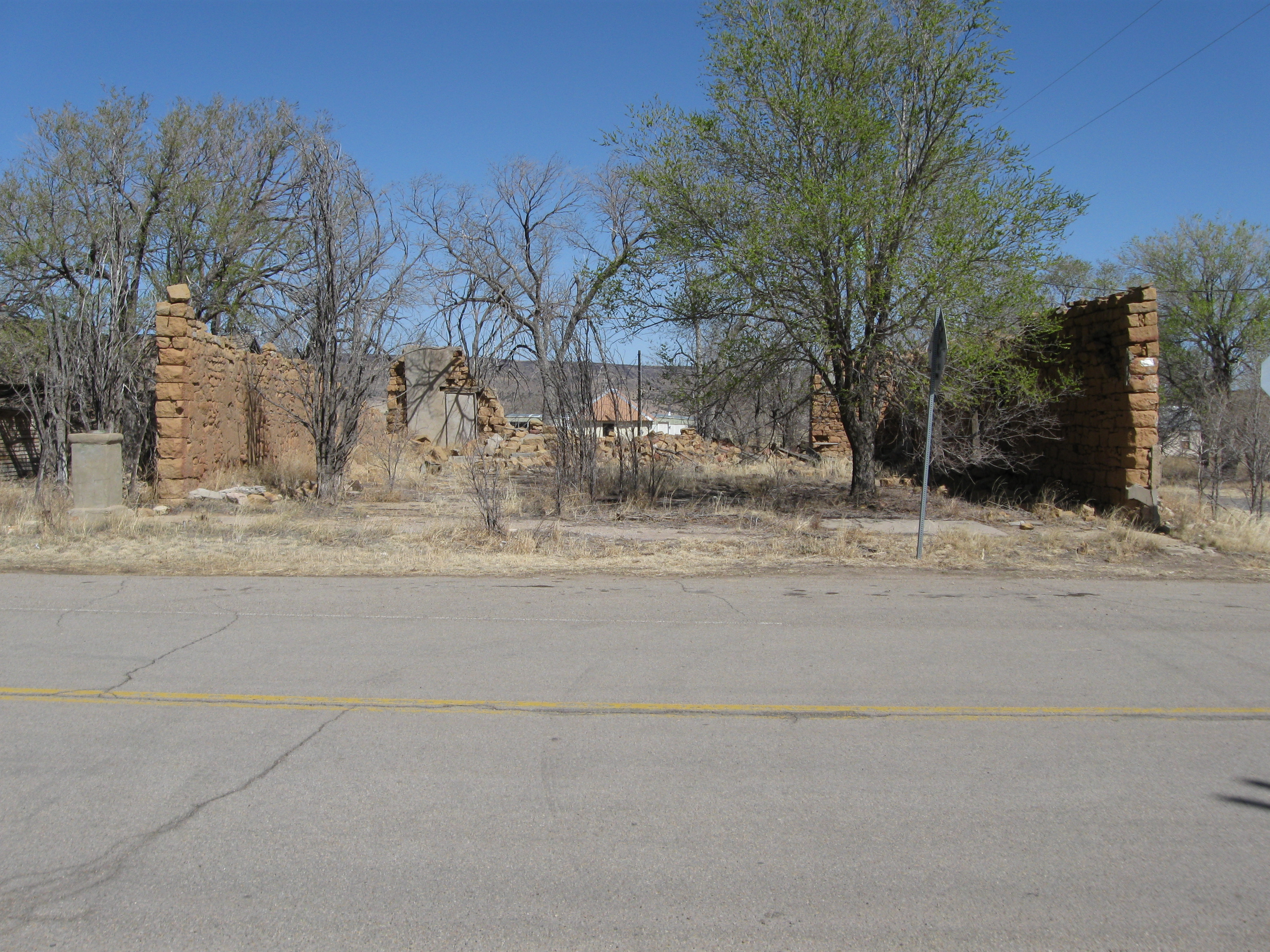
Ruins in Kenton, March 2009

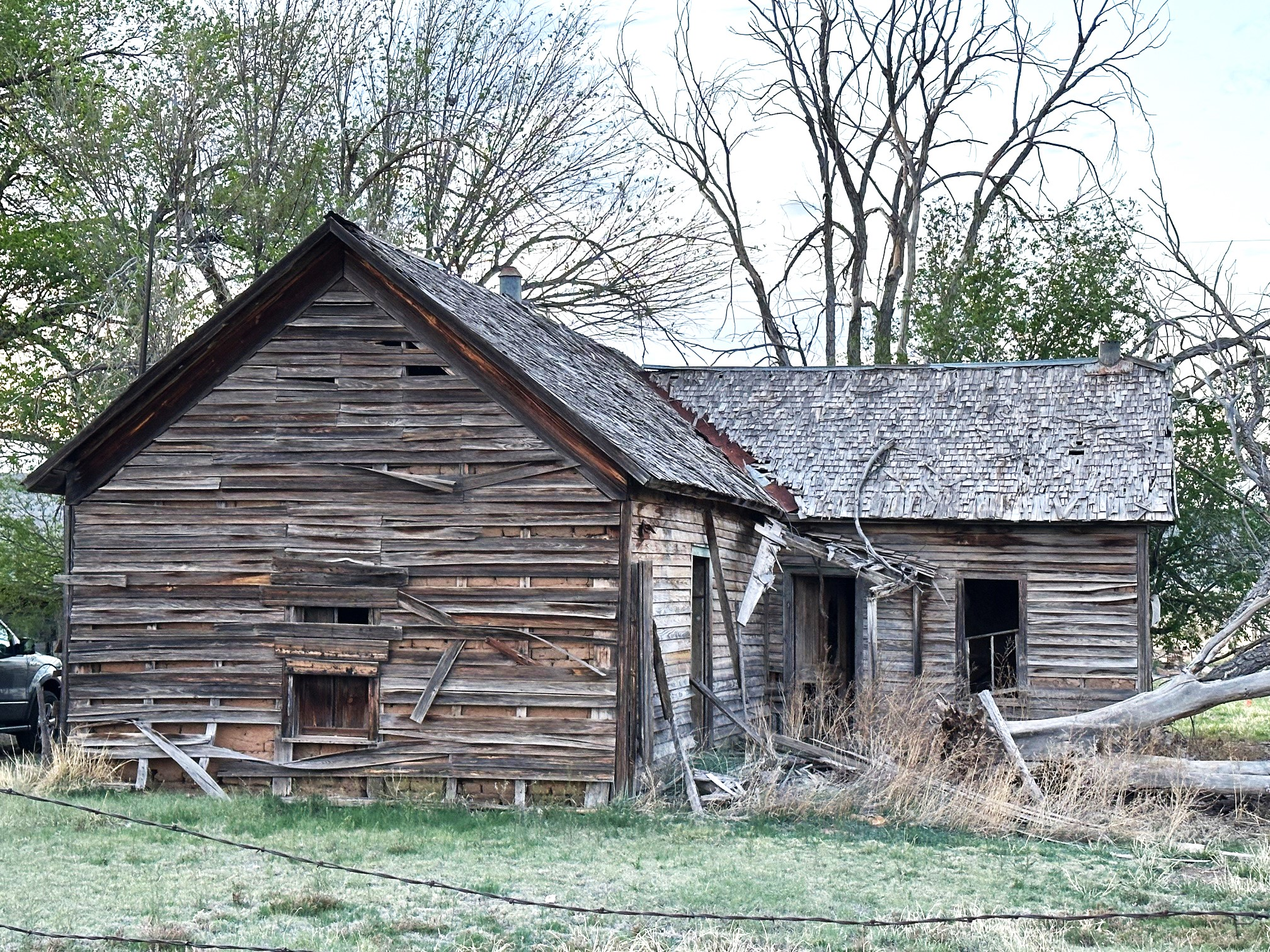
Abandoned house in Kenton, April 2024

== Notable people ==
- Foy Vance, a popular Northern Irish singer-songwriter, spent his early childhood living in Kenton during the late 1970s. His father, Hugh Bailie Vance, was a traveling preacher in the evangelical Churches of Christ.
