= New Mexico State Road 456 =

State highway in New Mexico, United States

State Road 456
- NM 456 highlighted in red

Route information
- Maintained by NMDOT
- Length: 58.784 mi (94.604 km)

Major junctions
- West end: NM 325 in Folsom
- NM 72 in Folsom
- East end: SH-325 west of Kenton, OK

Location
- Country: United States
- State: New Mexico
- Counties: Union

Highway system
- New Mexico State Highway System; Interstate; US; State; Scenic
← NM 455	→ NM 457

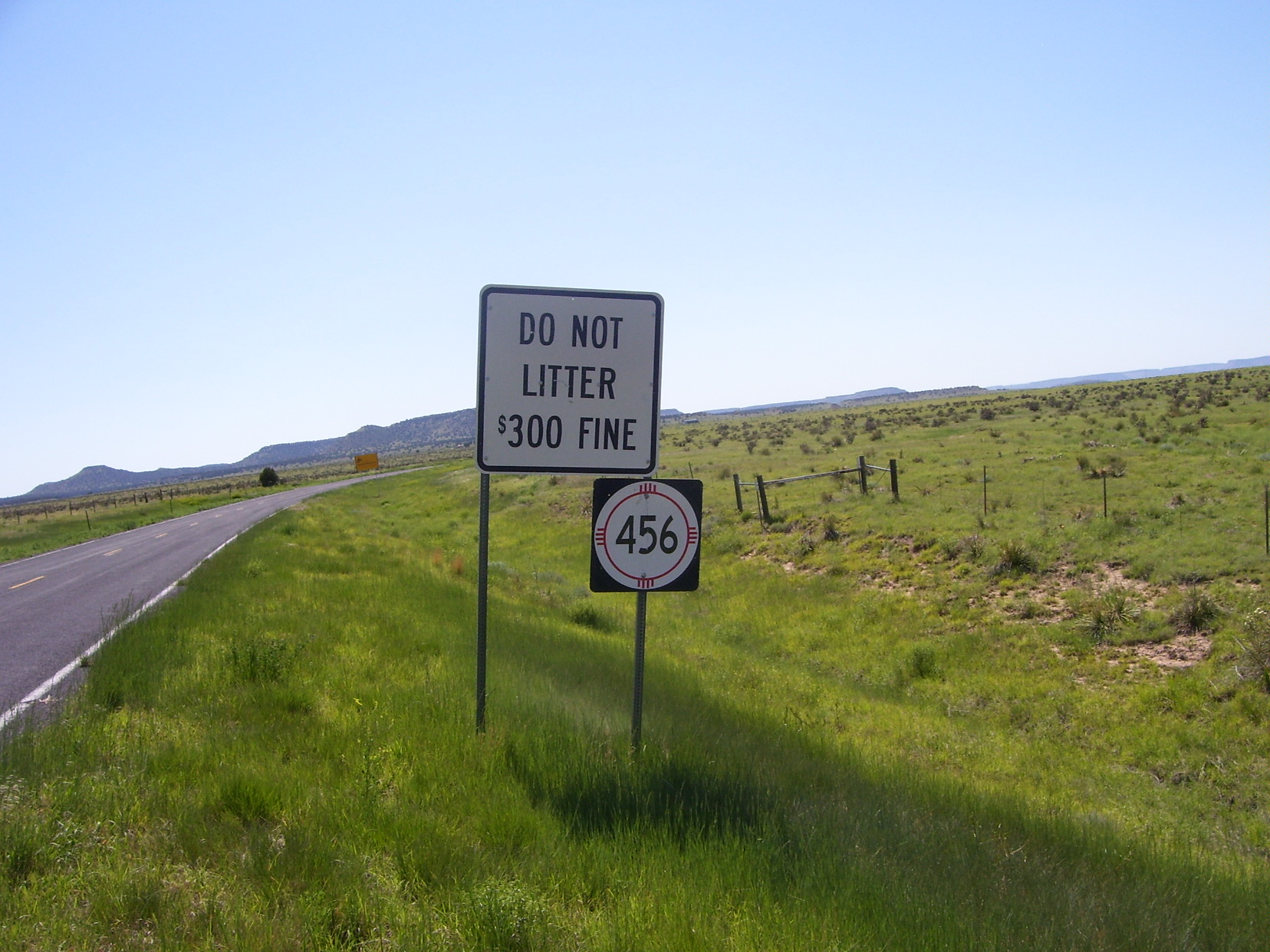
NM 456 just west of the Oklahoma state line.

State Road 456 (NM 456) is a 58.784-mile-long (94.604 km) state highway in northeast New Mexico. NM 456's western terminus is in Folsom, New Mexico at NM 325, and the eastern terminus is at the Oklahoma state line west of Kenton, Oklahoma. At the state line, it becomes Oklahoma State Highway 325 (SH-325).

== Route description ==
NM 456 parallels the Cimarron River for its entire length. It does not leave Union County. It is a former routing of U.S. Route 64 (US 64). Seventeen consecutive miles of it are unpaved, as per signs at each end of the unpaved stretch; their main purpose is to warn of potential impassibility in inclement weather. The stretch does have two spots of pavement, nevertheless: one about eight miles (13 km) in from the west, which is only about 100 feet (30 m) long, and one about fourteen miles (23 km) in from the west, which often confuses drivers since it is so near to the end of the advertised length (its pavement lasts about 0.5 miles (0.80 km)).

== Major intersections ==
The entire route is in Union County.

Location	mi	km	Destinations	Notes
Folsom	0.0	0.0	NM 325 – Capulin, Des Moines	Western terminus
Folsom	0.1	0.16	NM 72 west – Raton	Eastern terminus of NM 72
	7.6	12.2	NM 551 north – Branson, CO	Southern terminus of NM 551
	30.1	48.4	NM 370 south – Clayton	Northern terminus of NM 370
	57.9	93.2	NM 406 south – Seneca	Northern terminus of NM 406
	58.8	94.6	SH-325 east – Kenton	Continuation into Oklahoma
1.000 mi = 1.609 km; 1.000 km = 0.621 mi
