= New Mexico State Road 72 =

State highway in New Mexico, United States

State Road 72

Route information
- Maintained by NMDOT
- Length: 36.001 mi (57.938 km)

Major junctions
- West end: I-25 in Raton
- NM 526 east of Raton
- East end: NM 456 in Folsom

Location
- Country: United States
- State: New Mexico
- Counties: Colfax, Union

Highway system
- New Mexico State Highway System; Interstate; US; State; Scenic
| ← US 70 | → NM 73 |

State Road 72 (NM 72) is a state highway in the US state of New Mexico. Its total length is approximately 36 miles (58 km). NM 72's western terminus is at Interstate 25 (I-25) in Raton, and the eastern terminus is in Folsom at NM 456; in between, it traverses the top of Johnson Mesa. It is the only road by which the general public can access the top of a mesa in the Raton-Clayton volcanic field.

== Major intersections ==
| County | Location | mi | km | Destinations | Notes |
|---|---|---|---|---|---|
| Colfax | Raton | 0.000 | 0.000 | I-25 (US 85) – Raton, Springer, Trinidad | Western terminus; I-25 exit 452; road continues as Cook Avenue |
| Colfax | Ray | 3.896 | 6.270 | NM 526 east – Lake Maloya | Southern terminus of NM 526 |
| Union | Folsom | 36.001 | 57.938 | NM 456 – Branson, Des Moines, Capulin | Eastern terminus |
1.000 mi = 1.609 km; 1.000 km = 0.621 mi
