= New Mexico State Road 370 =

State highway in New Mexico, United States

State Road 370

Route information
- Maintained by NMDOT
- Length: 47.521 mi (76.478 km)

Major junctions
- South end: US 64 / US 87 near Clayton
- North end: NM 456 near Folsom

Location
- Country: United States
- State: New Mexico
- Counties: Union

Highway system
- New Mexico State Highway System; Interstate; US; State; Scenic
← NM 369	→ NM 371

State Road 370 (NM 370) is a 47.5-mile-long (76.4 km) state highway in the US state of New Mexico. NM 370's southern terminus is at U.S. Route 64 (US 64) and US 87 north of Clayton, and the northern terminus is at NM 456 east of Folsom.

== Major intersections ==
The entire route is in Union County.

Location	mi	km	Destinations	Notes
	0.000	0.000	US 64 / US 87	Southern terminus
	10.363	16.678	NM 455 west – Clayton Lake State Park	Eastern terminus of NM 455
	47.521	76.478	NM 456	Northern terminus
1.000 mi = 1.609 km; 1.000 km = 0.621 mi
