= New Mexico State Road 325 =

State highway in New Mexico, United States

State Road 325

Route information
- Maintained by NMDOT
- Length: 16.669 mi (26.826 km)

Major junctions
- West end: US 64 / US 87 in Capulin
- East end: US 64 / US 87 in Des Moines

Location
- Country: United States
- State: New Mexico
- Counties: Union

Highway system
- New Mexico State Highway System; Interstate; US; State; Scenic
| ← NM 322 | → NM 327 |

State Road 325 (NM 325) is a 16.669-mile-long (26.826 km) state highway in the US state of New Mexico. NM 325's western terminus is at U.S. Route 64 and U.S. Route 87 (US 64/87) in Capulin, and the eastern terminus is at US 64/87 in Des Moines.

== Major intersections ==
The entire route is in Union County.

| Location | mi | km | Destinations | Notes |
|---|---|---|---|---|
| Capulin | 0.000 | 0.000 | US 64 / US 87 | Eastern terminus |
| Folsom | 9.207 | 14.817 | NM 456 east | Western terminus of NM 456 |
| Des Moines | 16.669 | 26.826 | US 64 / US 87 | Western terminus |
1.000 mi = 1.609 km; 1.000 km = 0.621 mi
