= New Mexico State Road 453 =

State highway in New Mexico, United States

State Road 453

Route information
- Maintained by NMDOT
- Length: 20.979 mi (33.762 km)

Major junctions
- South end: US 56 / US 412 near Clayton
- North end: US 64 / US 87 in Grenville

Location
- Country: United States
- State: New Mexico
- Counties: Union

Highway system
- New Mexico State Highway System; Interstate; US; State; Scenic
| ← NM 451 | → NM 455 |

State Road 453 (NM 453) is a 20.979-mile-long (33.762 km) state highway in the US state of New Mexico. NM 453's southern terminus is at U.S. Route 56 (US 56) and US 412 west of Clayton, and the northern terminus is at US 64 and US 87 in Grenville.

== Major intersections ==
The entire route is in Union County.

| Location | mi | km | Destinations | Notes |
|---|---|---|---|---|
| | 0.000 | 0.000 | US 56 / US 412 | Southern terminus |
| Grenville | 20.979 | 33.762 | US 64 / US 87 | Northern terminus |
1.000 mi = 1.609 km; 1.000 km = 0.621 mi
