= New Mexico State Road 526 =

State highway in New Mexico, United States

State Road 526
- E. Kelly Mora Memorial Highway

Route information
- Maintained by NMDOT
- Length: 6.339 mi (10.202 km)

Major junctions
- South end: NM 72 near Raton
- North end: CR 85.5 at the Colorado–New Mexico border

Location
- Country: United States
- State: New Mexico
- Counties: Colfax

Highway system
- New Mexico State Highway System; Interstate; US; State; Scenic
← NM 525	→ NM 527

State Road 526 (NM 526) is a 6.339-mile-long (10.202 km) state highway in the US state of New Mexico. NM 526's southern terminus is at NM 72 east-northeast of Raton, and the northern terminus is at County Road 85.5 (CR 85.5) by Lake Moloya at the Colorado–New Mexico border. It follows Chicorica Creek for its entire length.

== Major intersections ==
The entire route is in Colfax County.

Location	mi	km	Destinations	Notes
Ray	0.000	0.000	NM 72 – Raton, Folsom	Southern terminus; highway continues as NM 72 west
Sugarite Canyon State Park	6.339	10.202	CR 85.5 north	Continuation into Colorado
1.000 mi = 1.609 km; 1.000 km = 0.621 mi
