= New Mexico State Road 551 =

State highway in New Mexico, United States

State Road 551
- NM 551 highlighted in red

Route information
- Maintained by NMDOT
- Length: 6.44 mi (10.36 km)

Major junctions
- South end: NM 456 near Folsom
- North end: SH 389 at the Colorado border in Branson, CO

Location
- Country: United States
- State: New Mexico
- Counties: Union

Highway system
- New Mexico State Highway System; Interstate; US; State; Scenic
← US 550	→ NM 552

State Road 551 (NM 551) is a 6.44-mile-long (10.36 km) state highway in the US state of New Mexico. NM 551's southern terminus is at NM 456 northeast of Folsom, and the northern terminus is at Colorado State Highway 389 (SH 389) at the Colorado/ New Mexico border.

== Major intersections ==
The entire route is in Union County.

Location	mi	km	Destinations	Notes
	0.000	0.000	NM 456 – Folsom, Kenton OK	Southern terminus
	6.440	10.364	SH 389 – Branson	Northern terminus, continues as SH 389 at the Colorado border
1.000 mi = 1.609 km; 1.000 km = 0.621 mi
