= New Mexico State Road 455 =

State highway in New Mexico, United States

State Road 455
- NM 455 highlighted in red

Route information
- Maintained by NMDOT
- Length: 1.54 mi (2.48 km)

Major junctions
- West end: Clayton Lake State Park near Clayton
- East end: NM 370 near Clayton

Location
- Country: United States
- State: New Mexico
- Counties: Union

Highway system
- New Mexico State Highway System; Interstate; US; State; Scenic
← NM 453	→ NM 456

State Road 455 (NM 455) is a 1.54-mile-long (2.48 km) state highway in the US state of New Mexico. NM 455's eastern terminus is at NM 370 northwest of Clayton, and the western terminus is at Clayton Lake State Park northwest of Clayton.

== Major intersections ==
The entire route is in Union County.

Location	mi	km	Destinations	Notes
	0.000	0.000	NM 370	Eastern terminus
	1.540	2.478	Clayton Lake State Park	Western terminus
1.000 mi = 1.609 km; 1.000 km = 0.621 mi
