= Clayton Municipal Airport =

Clayton Municipal Airport may refer to:

- Clayton Municipal Airport (Alabama), an airport serving Clayton, Alabama, United States (FAA: 11A)
- Clayton Municipal Airpark, an airport serving Clayton, New Mexico, United States (FAA: CAO)
- L. M. Clayton Airport, an airport serving Wolf Point, Montana, United States (FAA: OLF)
