= Clayton Lake State Park =

State park in New Mexico, United States

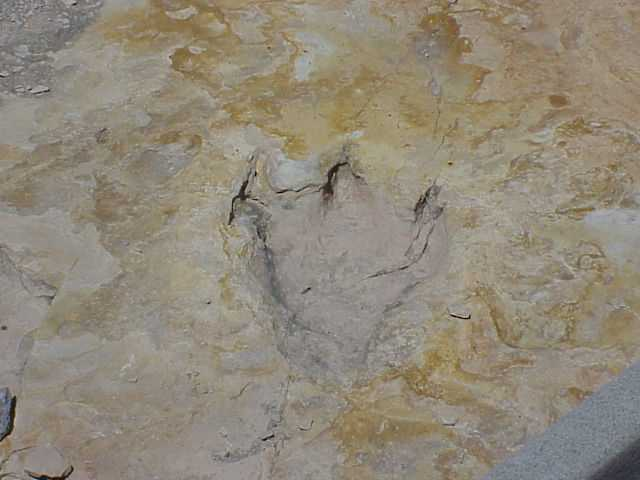
- Dinosaur footprint from the fossil trackway at Clayton Lake State Park

- Location within New Mexico
- Interactive map of Clayton Lake State Park
- Location: Union County, New Mexico, United States
- Coordinates: 36°34′34″N 103°18′19″W
- Area: 471 acres (191 ha)
- Elevation: 5,186 ft (1,581 m)
- Established: 1965
- Administrator: New Mexico State Parks Division
- Website: Official website

Clayton Lake State Park is a state park of New Mexico, United States, featuring a 170-acre (69 ha) recreational reservoir and a fossil trackway of dinosaur footprints. It is located 15 miles (24 km) north of Clayton, close to New Mexico's border with Colorado, Oklahoma, and Texas. The park is accessed via New Mexico State Road 455. The landscape is characterized by rolling grasslands, volcanic rocks, and sandstone bluffs, set on the western edge of the Great Plains. The park area was a stopover point for travelers along the Cimarron Cutoff of the Santa Fe Trail.

Visitor activities include picnicking, camping, and fishing at the lake, as well as viewing one of the most extensive dinosaur trackways in North America. Clayton Lake was created by the New Mexico Department of Game and Fish in 1955 as a fishing lake and winter waterfowl resting area.

A dam was constructed across Seneca Creek, which is actually a series of seeps except after heavy rains. During the fishing season, which usually runs from March to October each year, the lake is a popular spot for anglers hoping to catch trout, catfish, bass, and walleye. Boats are allowed on the lake, but are restricted to trolling speeds. The lake is closed to fishing during the winter, when it serves as a stopover for waterfowl.

The park offers a group shelter and a modern comfort station. The dinosaur tracks are embedded in rock near the lake. They can be observed on the dam spillway at the end of a gentle 0.25-mile (0.40 km) trail. The best times to view the tracks are in the morning and the late afternoon. A sheltered gazebo and a boardwalk trail provide extensive information regarding the dinosaurs.

In 2010, Clayton Lake State Park with the Star Point Observatory was designated by the International Dark-Sky Association as a Dark Sky Park.
