= New Mexico State Road 525 =

State highway in New Mexico, United States

State Road 525
- NM 525 highlighted in red

Route information
- Maintained by NMDOT
- Length: 4.946 mi (7.960 km)

Major junctions
- South end: Entrance to Stallion Site Camp
- North end: US 380 near San Antonio

Location
- Country: United States
- State: New Mexico
- Counties: Socorro

Highway system
- New Mexico State Highway System; Interstate; US; State; Scenic
← NM 524	→ NM 526

State Road 525 (NM 525) is a 4.946-mile-long (7.960 km) state highway in the US state of New Mexico. NM 525's southern terminus is at the entrance to Stallion Site Camp, and along the northern perimeter of the White Sands Missile Range and the northern terminus is at U.S. Route 380 (US 380) east of San Antonio. This is the only public access route, and gate, to the US Army's semi annual public open house of the Trinity Site.

== Major intersections ==
The entire route is in Socorro County.

Location	mi	km	Destinations	Notes
	0.000	0.000	US 380	Northern terminus
Ancho	4.946	7.960	Entrance to Stallion Site Camp	Southern terminus
1.000 mi = 1.609 km; 1.000 km = 0.621 mi

== See also ==
- WSMR - TRINITY SITE OPEN HOUSE
