= Colorado State Highway 389 =

State highway in Colorado, United States

State Highway 389
- Map of Las Animas County in southern Colorado with SH 389 highlighted in red

Route information
- Maintained by CDOT
- Length: 12.38 mi (19.92 km)
- Existed: 1949–present

Major junctions
- South end: NM 551 at the New Mexico state line in Branson
- North end: US 160 north of Branson

Location
- Country: United States
- State: Colorado
- Counties: Las Animas

Highway system
- Colorado State Highway System; Interstate; US; State; Scenic
← US 385	→ SH 391

State Highway 389 (SH 389) is a 12.38-mile (19.92 km) state highway in Las Animas County, Colorado, United States, that connects New Mexico State Road 551 (NM 551) at the New Mexico state line with U.S. Route 160 (US 160), north of Branson.

== Route description ==
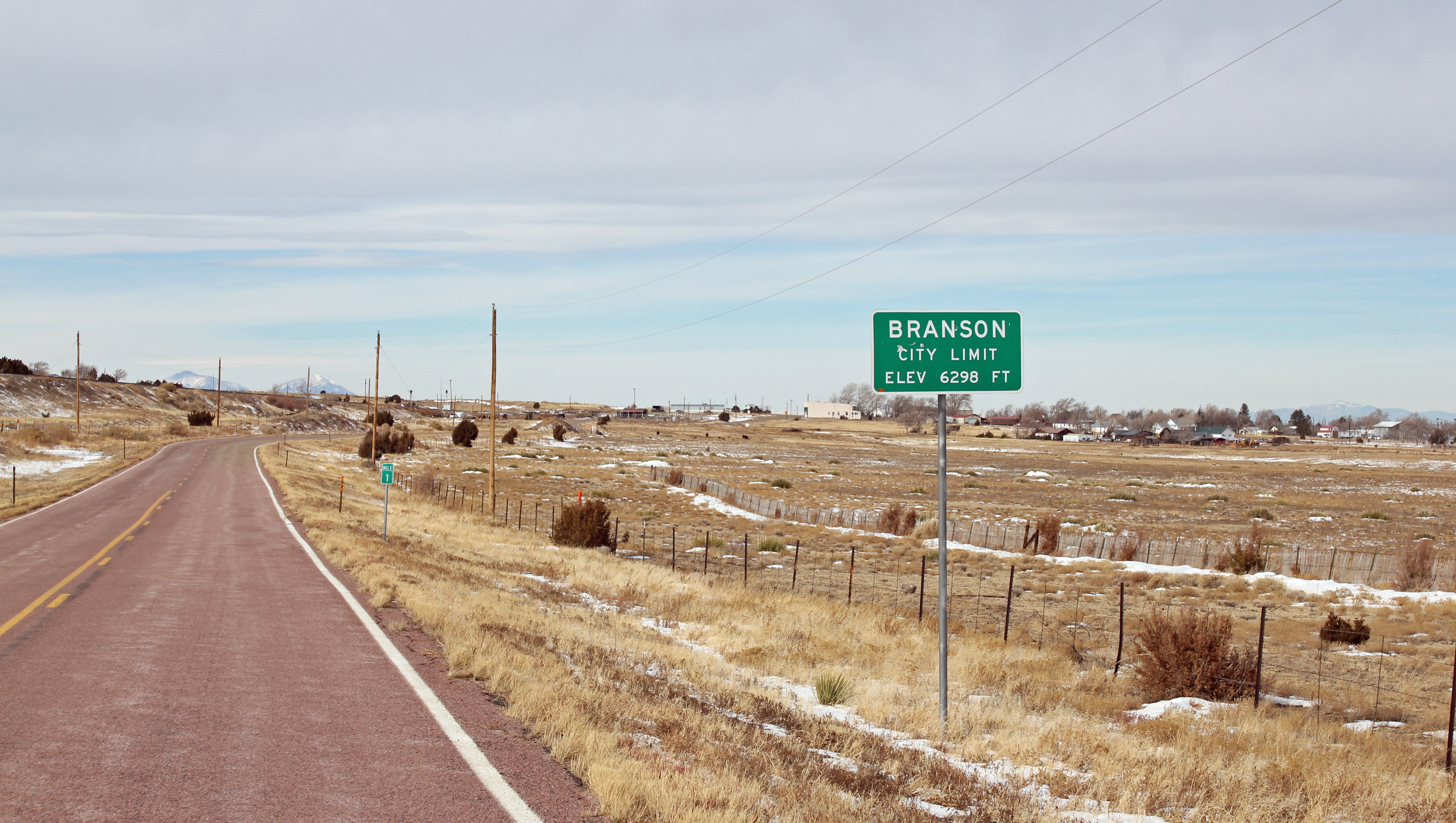
SH 389 just before it enters Branson from the south, December 2012

SH 389 begins at the New Mexico border as the continuation of NM 551. It traverses several small passes of up to 8,000 feet (2,400 m) before entering the town of Branson about 1.5 miles (2.4 km) north of the New Mexico border.

As the highway proceeds northward from Branson, valleys and hills surround the area and the Black Mesa comes into view. However, no mountains are visible.

The highway ends at its junction with US 160 between of Trinidad and Kim, about 10 miles (16 km) north of Branson. The Comanche National Grassland is nearby.

== History ==
This routing was originally designated by the Colorado Department of Transportation as SH 100 (deleted) and as a portion of US 160. When US 160 was rerouted in 1949, the former portion was numbered as SH 389, today's number. Several years later, the section near NM 551 at the border was deleted, leaving the terminus at Branson. This section was re-added in 1964 and SH 389 was entirely paved a year later.

== Major intersections ==
The entire route is in Las Animas County.

Location	mi	km	Destinations	Notes
	0.000	0.000	NM 551 south – Folsom	Southern terminus
	12.380	19.924	US 160 – Springfield, Trinidad	Northern terminus
1.000 mi = 1.609 km; 1.000 km = 0.621 mi

== See also ==
- List of state highways in Colorado
