= Luna Theater =

- U.S. National Register of Historic Places
- NM State Register of Cultural Properties
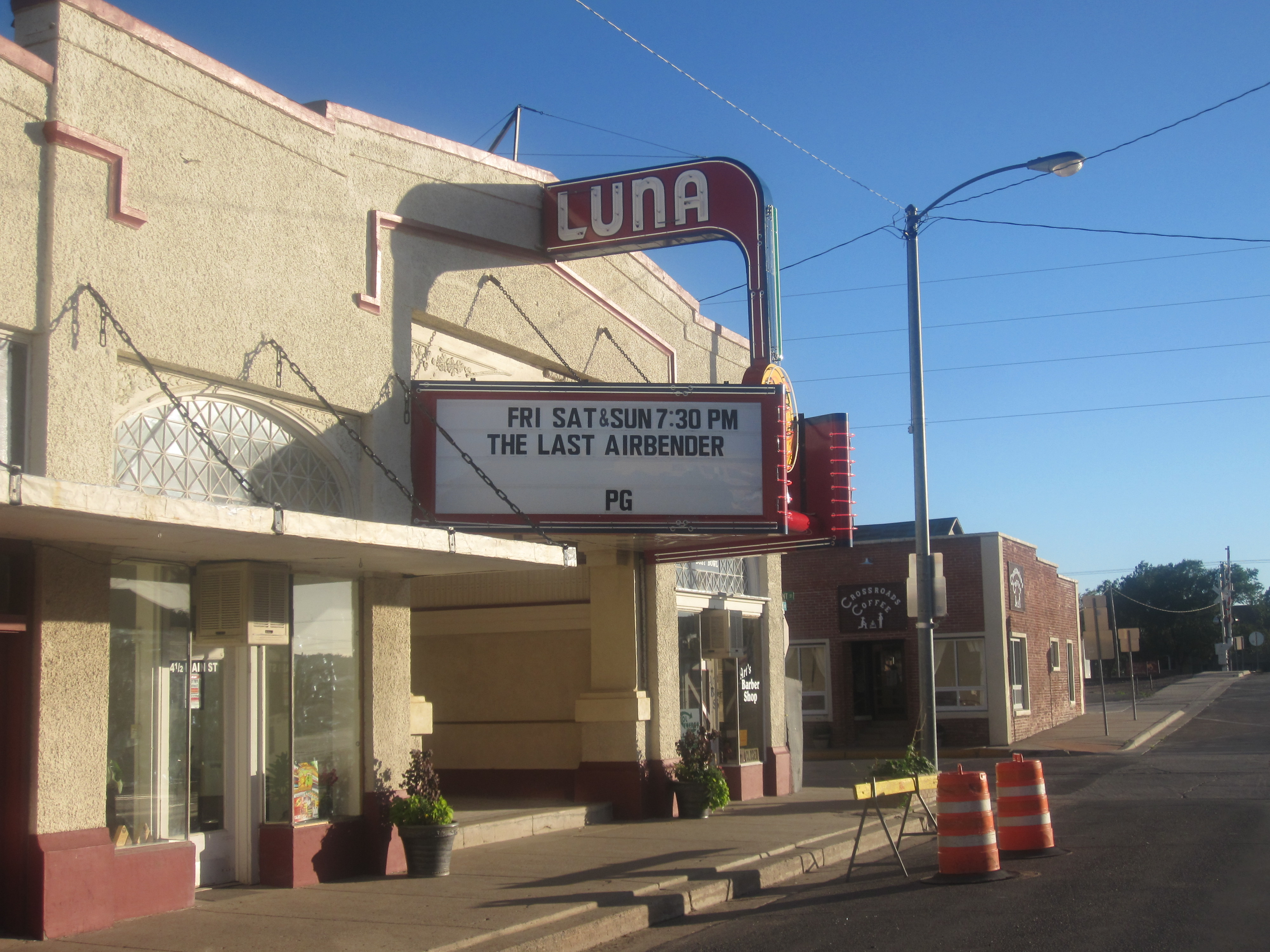
- Luna Theater

- Location within New Mexico
- Location: 2-6 Main St., Clayton, New Mexico
- Coordinates: 36°27′11″N 103°11′7″W
- Area: less than one acre
- Built: 1916
- Architectural style: Mission/Spanish Revival
- MPS: Movie Theaters in New Mexico MPS
- NRHP reference No.: 06001252
- NMSRCP No.: 1896

Significant dates
- Added to NRHP: January 17, 2007
- Designated NMSRCP: August 11, 2006

The Luna Theater, at 2-6 Main St. in Clayton, New Mexico, is a historic theater built in 1915–1916. Opened as the Mission Theater in 1915, it was renamed to the Luna Theater in 1935.

The building includes Mission/Spanish Revival architecture and was listed on the National Register of Historic Places in 2007. The theater was saved by preservationists and continues to show movies.

== See also ==
- Eklund Hotel, across the street, also National Register-listed
- National Register of Historic Places listings in Union County, New Mexico
