= New Mexico State Road 552 =

State highway in New Mexico, United States

State Road 552
- NM 552 highlighted in red

Route information
- Maintained by NMDOT
- Length: 1.9 mi (3.1 km)

Major junctions
- West end: End of state maintenance near Logan
- East end: US 54 near Logan

Location
- Country: United States
- State: New Mexico
- Counties: Quay

Highway system
- New Mexico State Highway System; Interstate; US; State; Scenic
← NM 551	→ NM 554

State Road 552 (NM 552) is a 1.9-mile-long (3.1 km) state highway in the US state of New Mexico. NM 552's western terminus is at the end of state maintenance southwest Logan, and the eastern terminus is at U.S. Route 54 (US 54) south of Logan.

== Major intersections ==
The entire route is in Quay County.

Location	mi	km	Destinations	Notes
	0.000	0.000	US 54	Eastern terminus
	1.900	3.058	End of state maintenance	Western terminus
1.000 mi = 1.609 km; 1.000 km = 0.621 mi
