= New Mexico State Road 527 =

State highway in New Mexico, United States

State Road 527
- NM 527 highlighted in red

Route information
- Maintained by NMDOT
- Length: 16.922 mi (27.233 km)

Major junctions
- West end: End of Route at Simms Mesa Campground
- East end: US 64 near Blanco

Location
- Country: United States
- State: New Mexico
- Counties: Rio Arriba

Highway system
- New Mexico State Highway System; Interstate; US; State; Scenic
← NM 526	→ NM 528

State Road 527 (NM 527) is a 16.922-mile-long (27.233 km) state highway in the US state of New Mexico. NM 527's western terminus is at the end of Route at Simms Mesa Campground, and the eastern terminus is at U.S. Route 64 (US 64) east of Blanco.

== Major intersections ==
The entire route is in Rio Arriba County.

Location	mi	km	Destinations	Notes
	0.000	0.000	US 64	Eastern terminus
	16.922	27.233	End of Route at Simms Mesa Campground	Western terminus
1.000 mi = 1.609 km; 1.000 km = 0.621 mi
