= Eklund Hotel =

- U.S. National Register of Historic Places
- NM State Register of Cultural Properties
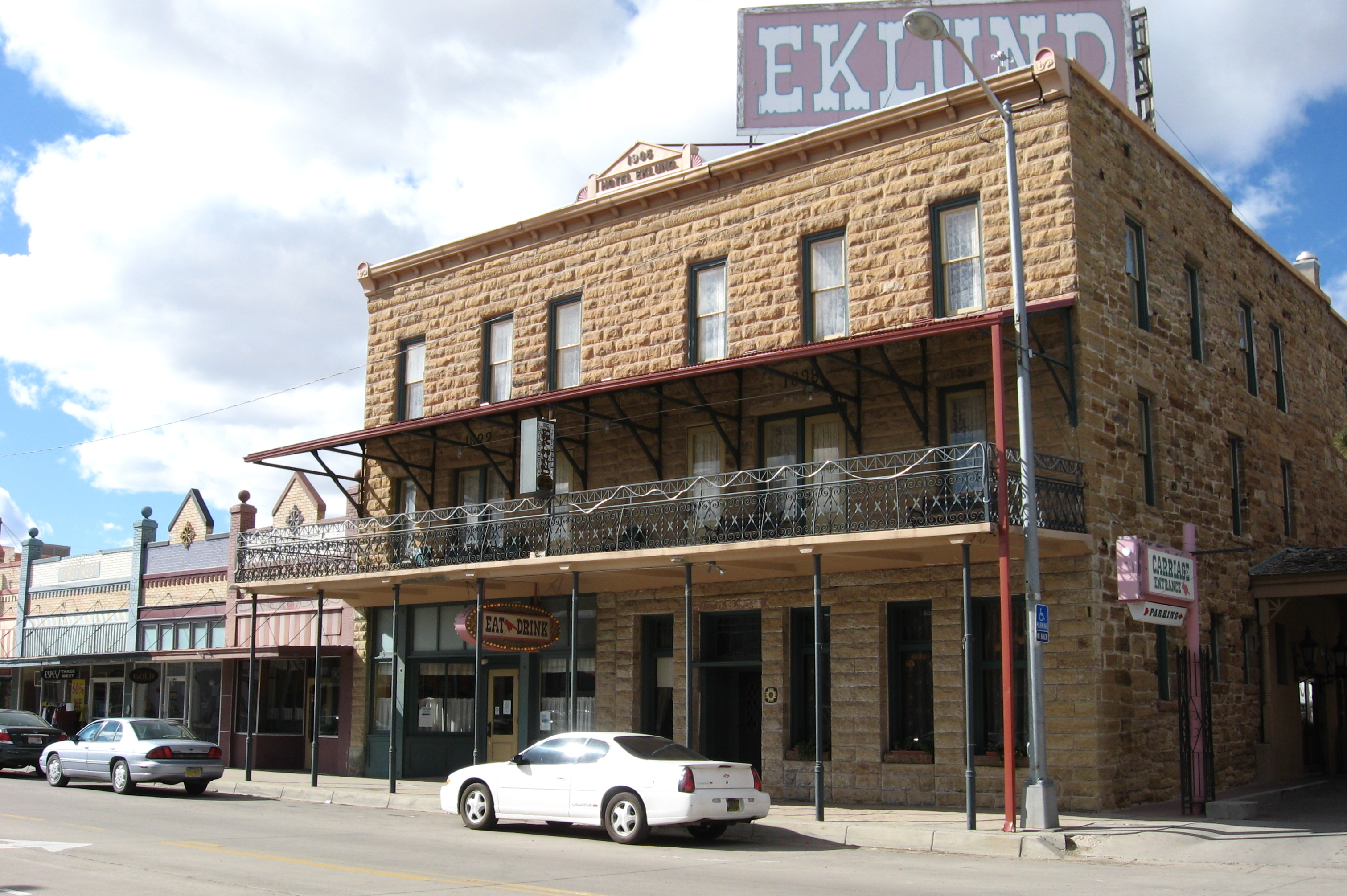
- Eklund Hotel in 2008

- Location within New Mexico
- Location: 15 Main St., Clayton, New Mexico
- Coordinates: 36°27′6″N 103°11′3″W
- Area: 0.2 acres (0.081 ha)
- Built: 1892
- Architectural style: Early Commercial
- NRHP reference No.: 01001470
- NMSRCP No.: 220

Significant dates
- Added to NRHP: January 17, 2002
- Designated NMSRCP: September 20, 1971

The Eklund Hotel, also known as Hotel Eklund and located at 15 Main St. in Clayton, New Mexico, United States, was built in 1892. It is an example of Early Commercial architecture. It was listed on the National Register of Historic Places in 2002.

It is located across the street from the historic Luna Theater, also NRHP-listed.

== See also ==
- National Register of Historic Places listings in Union County, New Mexico
