= Clayton Municipal Airpark =

Airport in New Mexico, United States

- IATA: CAO; ICAO: KCAO; FAA LID: CAO

Summary
- Airport type: Public
- Owner: Town of Clayton
- Serves: Clayton, New Mexico
- Elevation AMSL: 4,970 ft (1,510 m)
- Coordinates: 36°26′47″N 103°08′59″W

Map
- Location of airport in New Mexico

Runways
Direction	Length		Surface
Direction	ft	m	Surface
2/20	6,307	1,922	Asphalt
12/30	4,106	1,252	Asphalt

Statistics (2022)
- Aircraft operations (year ending 4/21/2022): 3,300
- Based aircraft: 10
- Source: Federal Aviation Administration

Clayton Municipal Airpark (IATA: CAO, ICAO: KCAO, FAA LID: CAO) is a town owned, public use airport located two nautical miles (4 km) east of the central business district of Clayton, a town in Union County, New Mexico, United States. It is included in the National Plan of Integrated Airport Systems for 2011–2015, which categorized it as a general aviation facility.

== Facilities and aircraft ==
Clayton Municipal Airpark covers an area of 755 acres (306 ha) at an elevation of 4,970 feet (1,515 m) above mean sea level. It has two runways with asphalt surfaces: 2/20 is 6,307 by 75 feet (1,922 x 23 m); and 12/30 is 4,106 by 60 feet (1,252 x 18 m).

For the 12-month period ending April 21, 2022, the airport had 3,300 aircraft operations, an average of 63 per week: 100% general aviation. At that time there were 10 aircraft based at this airport: 9 single-engine and 1 helicopter.
