= Lake Maloya =

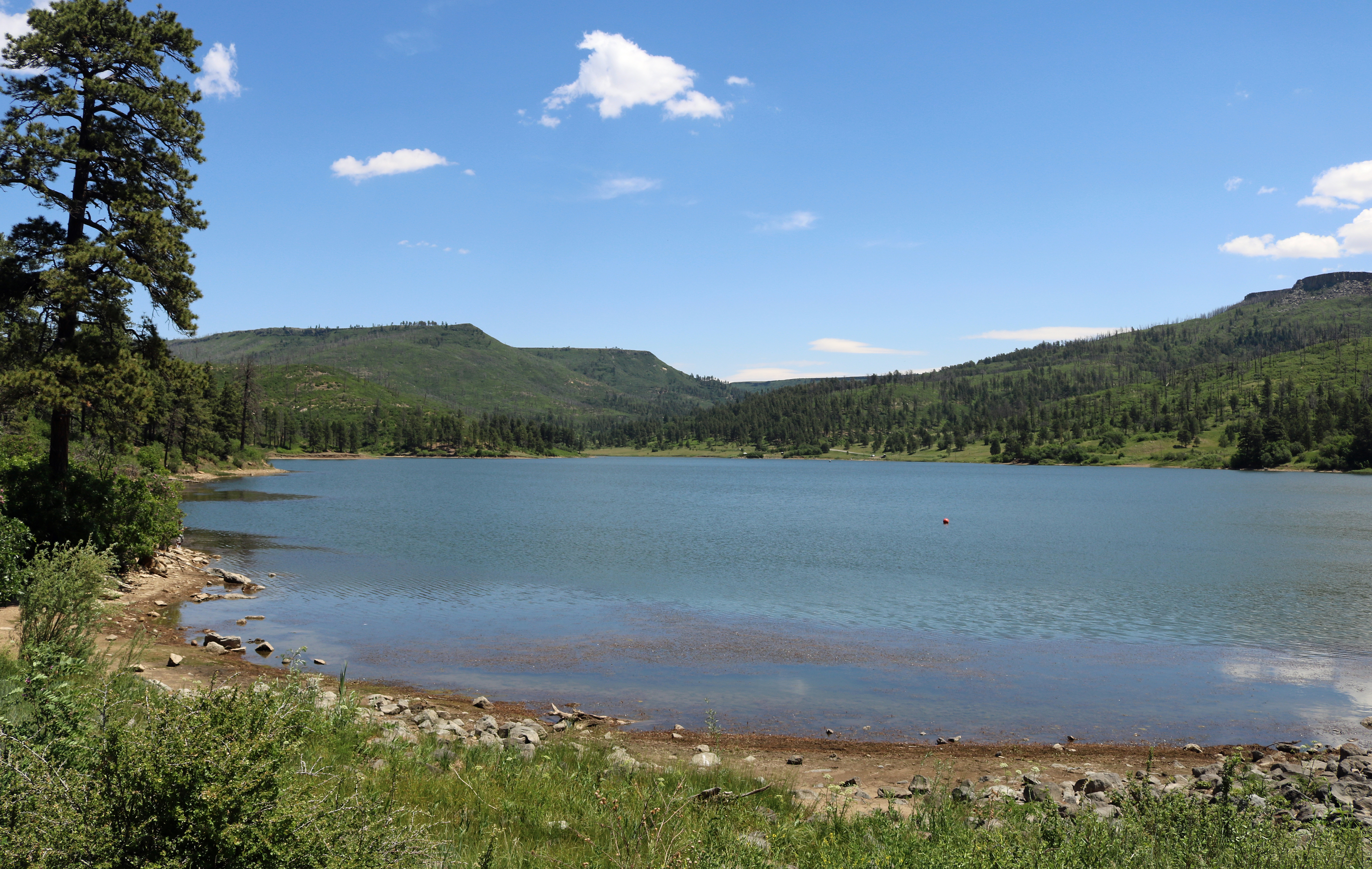
- Lake Maloya in 2018.

- Location within New Mexico
- Location: Colfax County, New Mexico and Las Animas County, Colorado
- Coordinates: 36°59′01″N 104°22′26″W
- Type: reservoir
- Surface elevation: 7,516 ft (2,291 m)

Lake Maloya is a reservoir in Sugarite Canyon State Park on the New Mexico-Colorado State border, northeast of Raton, New Mexico. It is the main source of water for the city and its outlying areas. When full, the lake's surface has an elevation of 7,516 feet (2,291 meters).

== Climate ==
Climate data for Lake Maloya, New Mexico, 1991–2020 normals, extremes 1942–present: 7400ft (2256m)
Month	Jan	Feb	Mar	Apr	May	Jun	Jul	Aug	Sep	Oct	Nov	Dec	Year
Record high °F (°C)	67 (19)	75 (24)	82 (28)	82 (28)	90 (32)	92 (33)	93 (34)	91 (33)	92 (33)	82 (28)	75 (24)	72 (22)	93 (34)
Mean maximum °F (°C)	58.3 (14.6)	59.2 (15.1)	66.6 (19.2)	72.0 (22.2)	79.3 (26.3)	86.1 (30.1)	86.5 (30.3)	83.6 (28.7)	80.6 (27.0)	75.2 (24.0)	65.9 (18.8)	59.0 (15.0)	87.5 (30.8)
Mean daily maximum °F (°C)	41.8 (5.4)	43.3 (6.3)	50.4 (10.2)	56.6 (13.7)	66.2 (19.0)	75.4 (24.1)	78.2 (25.7)	76.1 (24.5)	70.5 (21.4)	60.3 (15.7)	49.5 (9.7)	41.8 (5.4)	59.2 (15.1)
Daily mean °F (°C)	26.3 (−3.2)	27.6 (−2.4)	35.4 (1.9)	41.6 (5.3)	50.9 (10.5)	59.7 (15.4)	63.6 (17.6)	62.2 (16.8)	55.9 (13.3)	45.5 (7.5)	35.2 (1.8)	27.4 (−2.6)	44.3 (6.8)
Mean daily minimum °F (°C)	10.7 (−11.8)	11.9 (−11.2)	20.4 (−6.4)	26.6 (−3.0)	35.6 (2.0)	44.0 (6.7)	49.0 (9.4)	48.2 (9.0)	41.3 (5.2)	30.6 (−0.8)	20.8 (−6.2)	12.9 (−10.6)	29.3 (−1.5)
Mean minimum °F (°C)	−9.2 (−22.9)	−8.0 (−22.2)	1.2 (−17.1)	13.1 (−10.5)	23.8 (−4.6)	35.4 (1.9)	43.0 (6.1)	42.7 (5.9)	29.7 (−1.3)	15.1 (−9.4)	3.1 (−16.1)	−5.4 (−20.8)	−12.8 (−24.9)
Record low °F (°C)	−33 (−36)	−25 (−32)	−19 (−28)	−6 (−21)	16 (−9)	25 (−4)	33 (1)	34 (1)	18 (−8)	−6 (−21)	−17 (−27)	−20 (−29)	−33 (−36)
Average precipitation inches (mm)	0.86 (22)	0.87 (22)	1.80 (46)	2.01 (51)	2.02 (51)	2.02 (51)	3.44 (87)	2.95 (75)	1.92 (49)	1.57 (40)	1.06 (27)	0.93 (24)	21.45 (545)
Average snowfall inches (cm)	13.4 (34)	13.0 (33)	18.3 (46)	11.0 (28)	1.6 (4.1)	0.0 (0.0)	0.0 (0.0)	0.0 (0.0)	0.2 (0.51)	5.2 (13)	11.0 (28)	15.6 (40)	89.3 (226.61)
Average precipitation days (≥ 0.01 in)	4.8	4.9	6.9	6.9	7.2	8.9	11.4	11.9	6.7	5.3	5.2	4.7	84.8
Average snowy days (≥ 0.1 in)	4.9	4.4	5.5	4.8	0.8	0.0	0.0	0.0	0.1	1.6	3.8	4.5	30.4
Source 1: NOAA
Source 2: XMACIS2 (records & monthly max/mins)
