= Sugarite Canyon State Park =

State park in New Mexico, United States

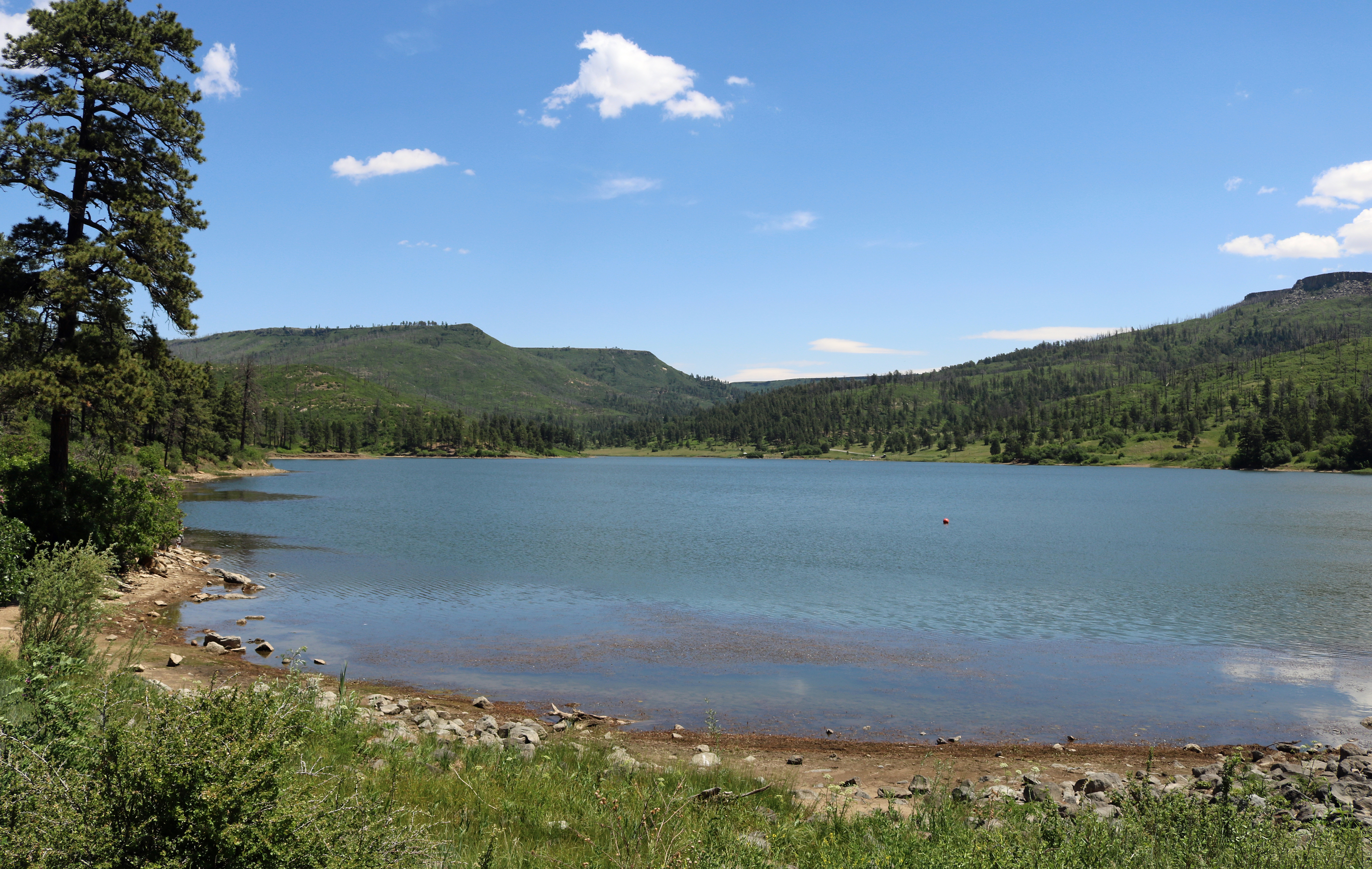
- Lake Maloya, the park's main attraction

- Location within New Mexico
- Location: Colfax County, New Mexico, United States
- Coordinates: 36°56′27″N 104°22′47″W
- Area: 3,600 acres (1,500 ha)
- Elevation: 6,664 ft (2,031 m)
- Established: 1985
- Administrator: New Mexico Energy, Minerals and Natural Resources Department
- Website: Official website

Sugarite Canyon State Park is a state park of New Mexico, United States, featuring a historic early-20th century coal-mining camp and natural scenery at the border of the Rocky Mountains and the Great Plains. The park is located on the Colorado–New Mexico state line 6 miles (9.7 km) in Colfax County, New Mexico, northeast of Raton.

== Setting ==
Sugarite Canyon (pronounced “shug-ur-eet”) is located east of Raton Pass in a sparsely populated region of lofty, steep-sided, flat-topped mesas; cone-shaped volcanoes; and old lava flows. Sugarite Canyon State Park, 3,600 acres (15 km^{2}) in size, consists of a stream valley flanked by basalt cliffs with Bartlett and Little Horse Mesas to the west and Horse Mesa on the east. Elevations in the park are from 6,950 feet (2,120 m) at the park entrance to 8,350 feet (2,550 m) on top of Little Horse Mesa. The park is about 4 miles (6.4 km) long and 1.5 miles (2.4 km) wide.

Most of the park is heavily forested with ponderosa pine and gambel oak forests. Along Chicorica Creek at lower elevations is a riparian forest of willow and cottonwood. Douglas fir, white fir, and aspen forests are found at higher elevations on north facing slopes. The flat top of Little Horse Mesa is a grassy meadow. Wildlife species in the park include mule deer, black bear, mountain lion, turkeys, and elk. The two artificial lakes in the park, Lake Maloya (120 acres) and Lake Alice (3 acres) are stocked with rainbow and brown trout. Abundant butterflies, wildflowers, and views down the Sugarite Valley to the Great Plains far below are highlights of the park.

== Climate ==
July is the warmest month with an average high temperature of 78 °F (26 °C) and an average low of 47 °F (8 °C) at Lake Maloya, elevation 7,500 feet (2,300 m). January is the coldest month with an average high of 41 °F (5 °C) and a low of 8 °F (−13 °C). The all-time high temperature is 93 °F (34 °C) and the all-time low is −33 °F (−36 °C). Precipitation averages 24 inches (61 cm) per year with July and August the wettest months and December and January the driest. Most summer rain comes in afternoon thunderstorms and most winter precipitation is in the form of snow, which can be heavy, especially at higher elevations. Droughts are not uncommon in the summer.

== History ==
The name Sugarite derives from either the Comanche and Ute name for a bird found in the canyon or the Spanish name, Chicorica, for chicory, a plant found here. Sugarite Canyon was used as a water supply for Raton as early as 1891. The lakes continue to be used for that purpose. Coal mining in the canyon began in 1894 and the town of Sugarite was established as a coal-mining town in 1912. Sugarite had a population of nearly one thousand at its peak. The mines began to shut down in 1941 and in 1944 the post office and railroad were shut down. Sugarite Canyon State Park was established in 1985 and now receives about 125,000 visitors per year. The park's land is owned by the City of Raton and leased to the State of New Mexico for 99 years.

== Activities ==
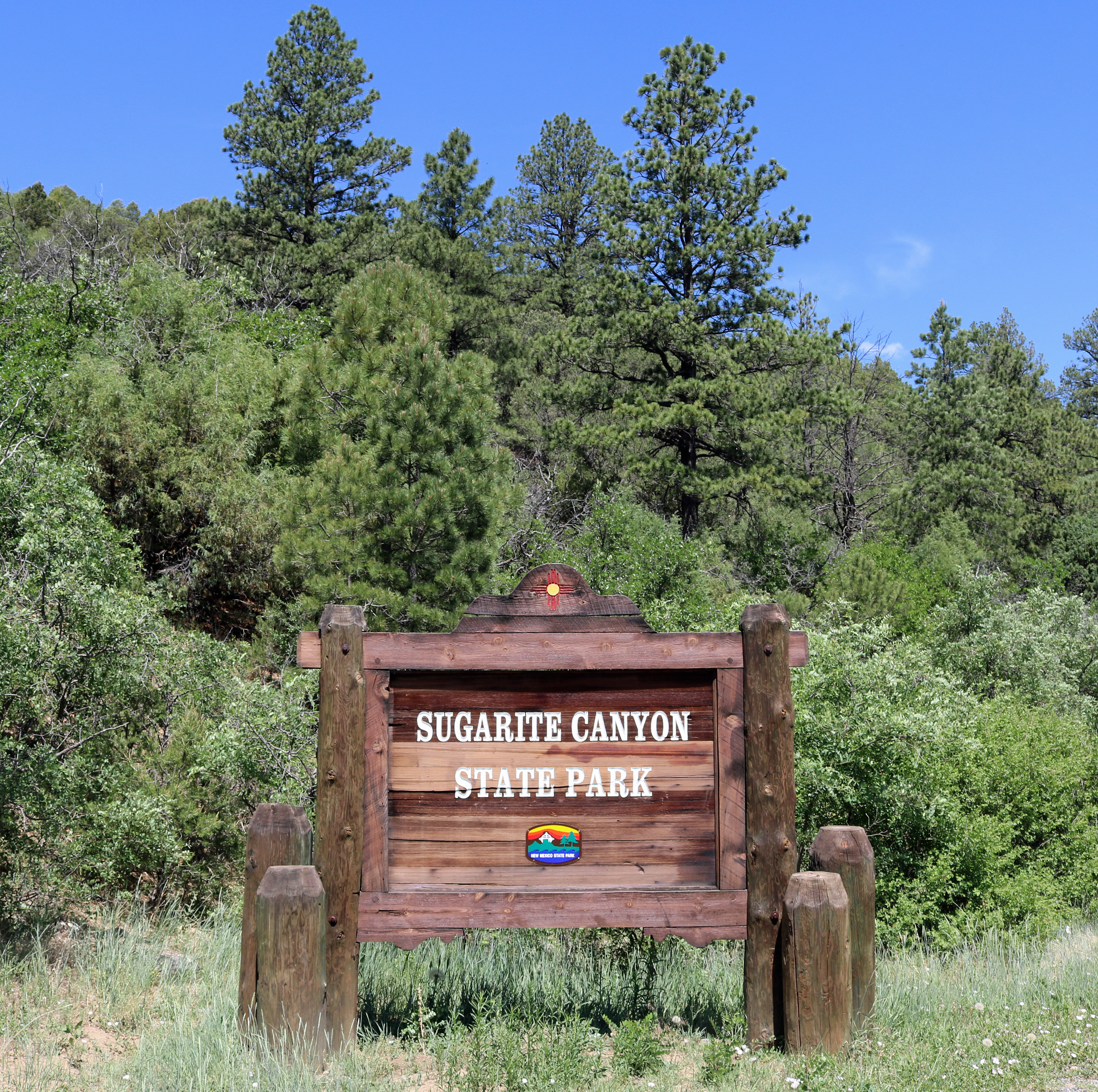
A sign at the park's main entrance.

Visitor Center and ruins of Sugarite. A visitor center is near the park entrance station and an interpretive trail follows and crosses Sugarite Creek through the ruins of the once thriving town and coal mine. An admission fee is charged to enter the park.

Fishing and boating. Lake Maloya and Lake Alice are used for trout fishing. Sailboats and boats powered with electric motors are permitted on Lake Maloya. A boat dock serves launching.

Camping and picnicking. Eleven sites in Lake Alice Campground have electric hookups. 41 developed sites in Lake Alice and Soda Pocket Campground offer tent camping. Picnicking is permitted at both campgrounds. Group shelters are located in Gambel Oak Group Area.

Hiking and horseback riding. There are 13 miles (21 km) of hiking trails in the park. Several trails beginning at the visitor center lead to ruins of the coal camp and follow the stream in the valley. The longest trail (6 miles) is Ponderosa Ridge/Opportunity Trail which begins at Lake Maloya spillway, follows a small stream, then climbs through an evergreen forest, then descends again to its starting point. Little Horse Mesa Trail, a 2-mile (3.2 km) round trip, climbs steeply to the highest point in the park on Little Horse Mesa. The Mesa top is flat and nearly treeless. Horse corrals are located near Soda Pocket Campground.

Cross country skiing. Skiing is possible all winter although some roads and facilities are closed.

Wildlife areas. Adjoining Sugarite Canyon State Park on the north in Colorado are two State Wildlife Areas (SWA): Lake Dorothey (5,152 acres) and James M. John (8,339 acres). The public road leads north from Lake Maloya and terminates shortly in a small parking lot. A campsite, picnic area, and restrooms are located here. A .5-mile (0.80 km) trail leads to 10-acre (4.0 ha) Lake Dorothey, which offers trout fishing and is situated in a meadow at an elevation of 7,600 feet (2,300 m). Beyond, an unmarked trail leads 4 miles (6.4 km) to the summit of Fisher's Peak Mesa in James M. John SWA. Elevations in Lake Dorothey SWA range from 7,511 feet (2,289 m) to 9,079 feet (2,767 m) and in James M. John SWA from 7,468 feet (2,276 m) to 9,653 feet (2,942 m). Access to both areas is by foot or horseback only.

The wildlife areas offer hunting for elk, deer, bear, mountain lion, turkey, and small game. James M. John SWA is closed from December 1 to April 1 every year. An annual butterfly festival counts and identifies butterflies in the meadows near Lake Dorothey. The 2006 one-day count was 637 butterflies of 38 species.
