= Capulin, New Mexico =

- Census-designated place
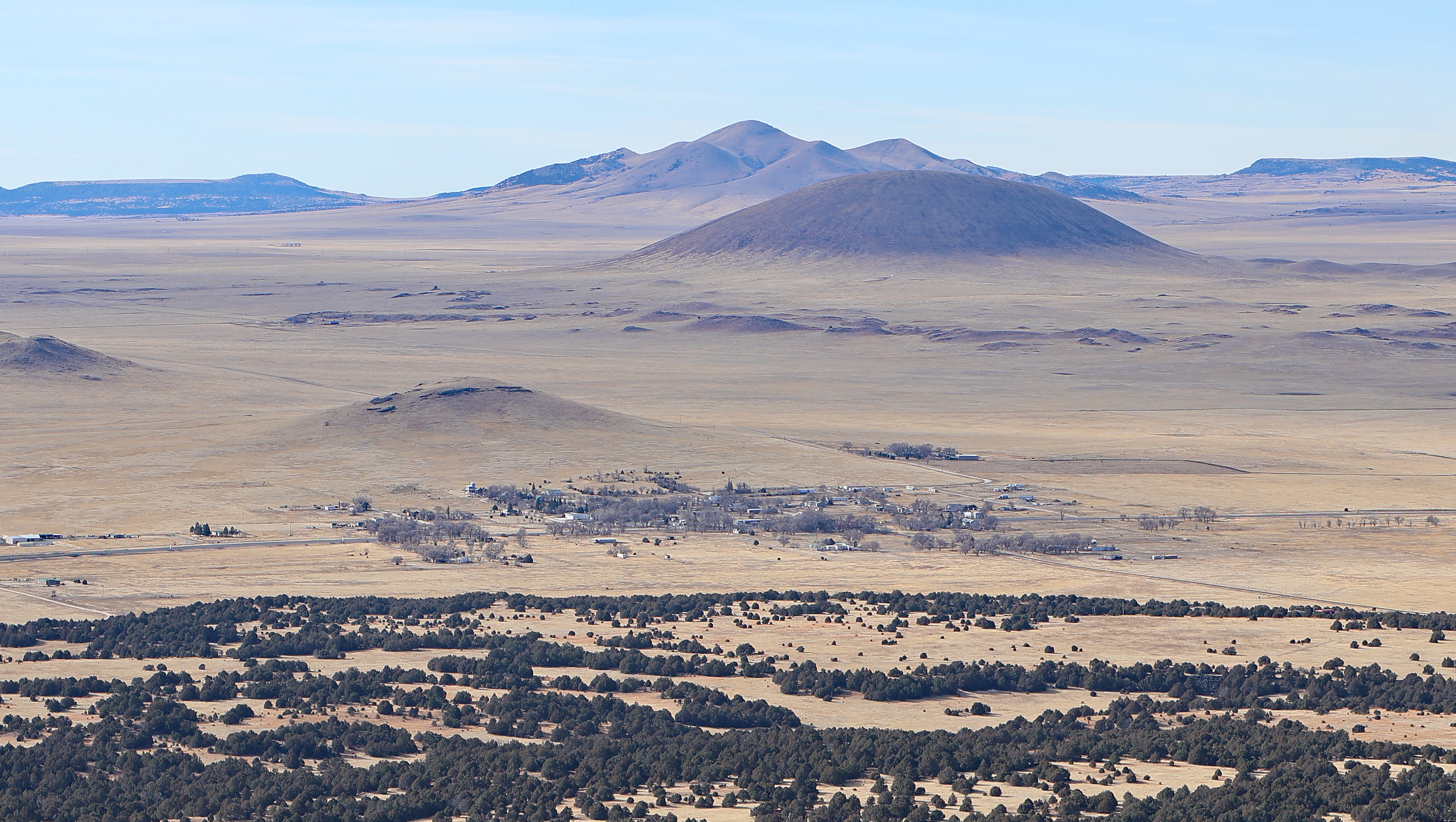
- Capulin viewed from nearby Capulin Volcano

- Location within New Mexico Location within the United States
- Coordinates: 36°44′56″N 103°59′45″W
- Country: United States
- State: New Mexico
- County: Union

Area
  - Total: 1.48 sq mi (3.84 km^{2})
  - Land: 1.48 sq mi (3.84 km^{2})
  - Water: 0 sq mi (0.00 km^{2})
- Elevation: 6,824 ft (2,080 m)

Population (2020)
  - Total: 61
  - Density: 41.1/sq mi (15.87/km^{2})
- Time zone: UTC-7 (Mountain (MST))
  - Summer (DST): UTC-6 (MDT)
- ZIP code: 88414
- Area code: 575
- GNIS feature ID: 2584068

Capulin is a census-designated place and unincorporated community in Union County, New Mexico, United States. As of the 2020 census, Capulin had a population of 61. Capulin had a post office until August 13, 2011; it still has its own ZIP code, 88414. U.S. routes 64 and 87 pass through the community.

== History ==
It was known as Dedman from 1909 to 1922, after railroad superintendent E.J. Dedman.

== Geography ==
Capulin Volcano National Monument is located 5 kilometres (3.1 miles) north of Capulin. The town was named after the volcano by Hispanic settlers after the Civil War.

=== Climate ===
Climate data for Capulin, New Mexico, 1991–2020 normals, extremes 1995–present
Month	Jan	Feb	Mar	Apr	May	Jun	Jul	Aug	Sep	Oct	Nov	Dec	Year
Record high °F (°C)	70 (21)	75 (24)	84 (29)	86 (30)	93 (34)	100 (38)	97 (36)	95 (35)	94 (34)	87 (31)	80 (27)	71 (22)	100 (38)
Mean maximum °F (°C)	62.6 (17.0)	65.5 (18.6)	74.4 (23.6)	79.1 (26.2)	84.5 (29.2)	93.7 (34.3)	93.8 (34.3)	90.7 (32.6)	87.9 (31.1)	81.4 (27.4)	73.7 (23.2)	64.5 (18.1)	94.9 (34.9)
Mean daily maximum °F (°C)	46.1 (7.8)	48.8 (9.3)	56.7 (13.7)	64.1 (17.8)	73.6 (23.1)	82.6 (28.1)	85.6 (29.8)	82.8 (28.2)	77.4 (25.2)	66.9 (19.4)	54.5 (12.5)	45.9 (7.7)	65.4 (18.6)
Daily mean °F (°C)	30.5 (−0.8)	33.4 (0.8)	40.5 (4.7)	47.7 (8.7)	56.6 (13.7)	65.9 (18.8)	69.8 (21.0)	67.7 (19.8)	61.7 (16.5)	50.1 (10.1)	38.4 (3.6)	30.1 (−1.1)	49.4 (9.7)
Mean daily minimum °F (°C)	14.9 (−9.5)	18.0 (−7.8)	24.3 (−4.3)	31.2 (−0.4)	39.5 (4.2)	49.1 (9.5)	54.0 (12.2)	52.6 (11.4)	46.0 (7.8)	33.2 (0.7)	22.3 (−5.4)	14.4 (−9.8)	33.3 (0.7)
Mean minimum °F (°C)	−6.9 (−21.6)	−3.5 (−19.7)	2.6 (−16.3)	16.2 (−8.8)	23.9 (−4.5)	37.7 (3.2)	46.9 (8.3)	44.6 (7.0)	32.0 (0.0)	16.1 (−8.8)	2.7 (−16.3)	−5.2 (−20.7)	−12.4 (−24.7)
Record low °F (°C)	−17 (−27)	−24 (−31)	−12 (−24)	6 (−14)	13 (−11)	28 (−2)	34 (1)	38 (3)	22 (−6)	−2 (−19)	−13 (−25)	−20 (−29)	−24 (−31)
Average precipitation inches (mm)	0.51 (13)	0.50 (13)	0.98 (25)	0.96 (24)	1.46 (37)	2.31 (59)	3.60 (91)	2.87 (73)	1.93 (49)	1.10 (28)	0.62 (16)	0.76 (19)	17.60 (447)
Average snowfall inches (cm)	6.4 (16)	5.4 (14)	7.7 (20)	4.6 (12)	0.7 (1.8)	0.0 (0.0)	0.0 (0.0)	0.0 (0.0)	0.0 (0.0)	2.4 (6.1)	4.6 (12)	9.1 (23)	40.9 (104.9)
Average precipitation days (≥ 0.01 in)	4.6	4.8	5.8	6.1	7.4	9.5	12.8	11.2	6.6	5.0	3.7	4.8	82.3
Average snowy days (≥ 0.1 in)	3.9	2.9	3.5	2.1	0.3	0.0	0.0	0.0	0.0	1.0	2.0	4.4	20.1
Source 1: NOAA
Source 2: National Weather Service (mean maxima/minima 2006–2020)

== Demographics ==
Historical population
Census	Pop.	Note	%±
2020	61		—
U.S. Decennial Census
