= Branson, Colorado =

Statutory town in Las Animas County, Colorado, United States

- Statutory town
- Town of Branson
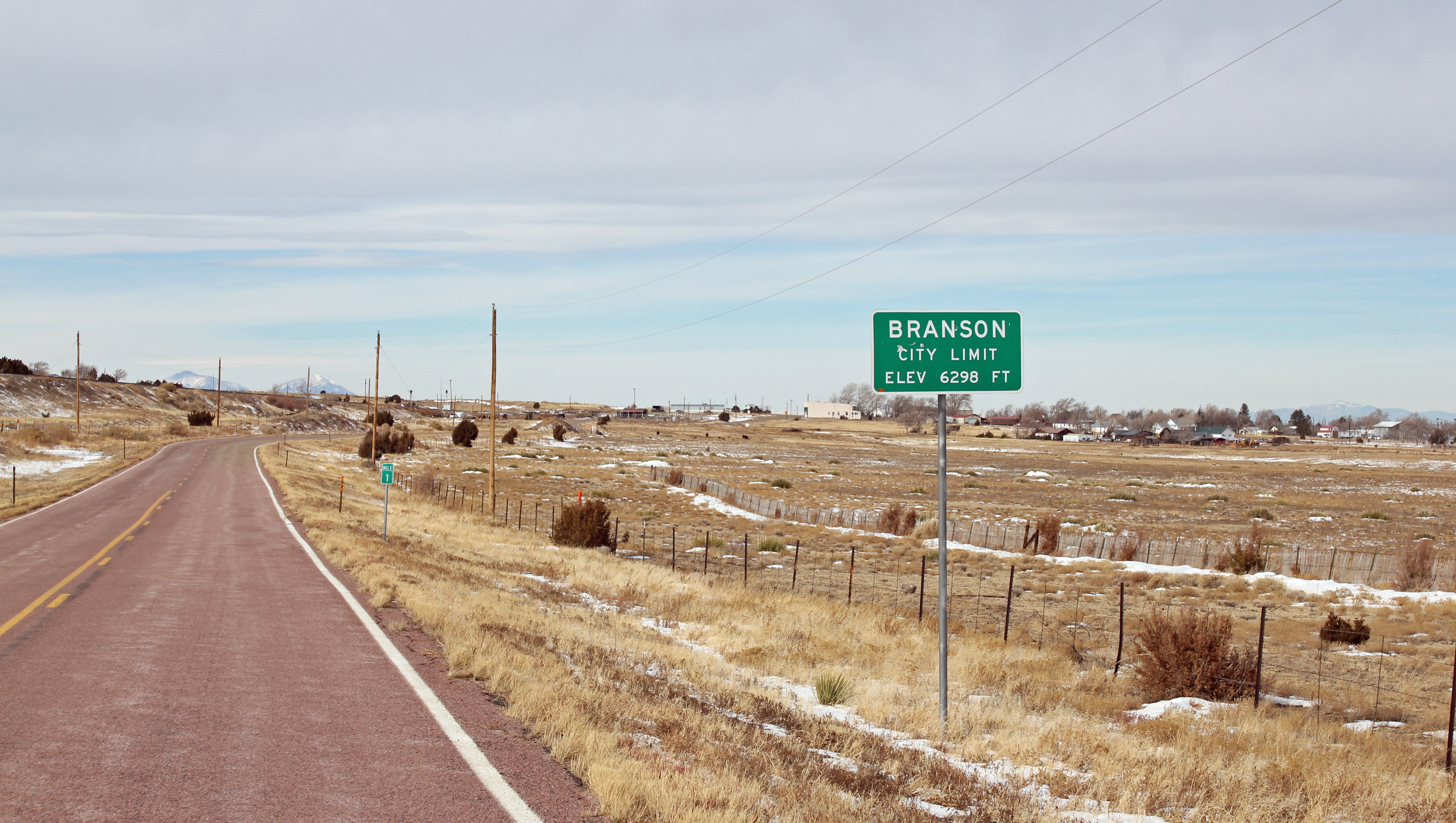
- Entering Branson from the south.

- Location of the Town of Branson in Las Animas County, Colorado
- Coordinates: 37°00′56″N 103°53′02″W
- Country: United States
- State: Colorado
- County: Las Animas
- Incorporated: 1921-03-26

Government
  - Type: statutory town

Area
  - Total: 0.245 sq mi (0.634 km^{2})
  - Land: 0.245 sq mi (0.634 km^{2})
  - Water: 0 sq mi (0.000 km^{2})
- Elevation: 6,270 ft (1,910 m)

Population (2020)
  - Total: 57
  - Density: 233/sq mi (90/km^{2})
- Time zone: UTC−07:00 (MST)
  - Summer (DST): UTC−06:00 (MDT)
- ZIP code: 81027
- Area code: 719
- GNIS town ID: 2411720
- FIPS code: 08-08345
- Website: www.bransoncolorado.com

Branson is a statutory town located in Las Animas County, Colorado, United States. The town population was 57 at the 2020 United States census. Branson is the southernmost town in the State of Colorado, located just 1 mile (1.6 km) from the New Mexico border.

Branson is located approximately 35 miles east of Trinidad, Colorado, on State Highway 389, in the Great Plains, as well in the Raton Mesa region. A few hundred feet south of Branson, Chicora Mesa rises 800 ft (240 m) above the village. It is a ranching community today. Farming in the area was severely impacted by the Dust Bowl of the 1930s and the population of Branson and its region has since been declining.

== History ==
Branson was first known as Wilson, or Wilson Switch; then as Coloflats. The Coloflats, Colorado, post office opened on August 19, 1915, and the name was changed to Branson on July 30, 1918. The town was named for Josiah F. Branson (1867–1944) who platted the town on his land. The Town of Branson was incorporated on March 26, 1921. Branson is located north of a break in the mesas which separate Southeast Colorado from Northeast New Mexico, the route of a minor branch of the Santa Fe Trail. It was founded near a switch, Wilson Switch, of the Denver, Texas, and Fort Worth Railroad, later merged into the Colorado and Southern Railway, a predecessor of today's Burlington Northern Santa Fe. A depot was built in 1918. Despite being unsuitable for farming, many homesteaders attempted dryland farming in the early 20th century. In good years there were bountiful harvests of grain and in the early 1920s the town boasted of 1000 people and 3 grain elevators as well as facilities such as a bank and a newspaper. Two fires within a year, drought beginning in 1925, and the Dust Bowl of the 1930s caused the population to decrease as the economy turned from farming to ranching.

As a measure of the village's isolation, residents of Branson and vicinity shop in Trinidad, an hour's drive away.

== Geography and climate ==
At the 2020 United States census, the town had a total area of 157 acres (0.634 km^{2}), all of it land. Branson has a semi-arid steppe climate, Bsk in the Köppen Classification system.

Climate data for Branson, Colorado (Elevation 6,257ft)
Month	Jan	Feb	Mar	Apr	May	Jun	Jul	Aug	Sep	Oct	Nov	Dec	Year
Record high °F (°C)	72 (22)	74 (23)	83 (28)	86 (30)	92 (33)	99 (37)	100 (38)	97 (36)	95 (35)	86 (30)	78 (26)	78 (26)	100 (38)
Mean daily maximum °F (°C)	45.8 (7.7)	47.6 (8.7)	52.5 (11.4)	62.8 (17.1)	71.7 (22.1)	81.8 (27.7)	86.4 (30.2)	84.5 (29.2)	78.1 (25.6)	67.0 (19.4)	55.0 (12.8)	47.2 (8.4)	65.0 (18.3)
Mean daily minimum °F (°C)	21.0 (−6.1)	22.2 (−5.4)	25.3 (−3.7)	35.4 (1.9)	44.6 (7.0)	53.9 (12.2)	59.1 (15.1)	58.1 (14.5)	50.7 (10.4)	40.4 (4.7)	29.0 (−1.7)	23.1 (−4.9)	38.6 (3.7)
Record low °F (°C)	−25 (−32)	−15 (−26)	−10 (−23)	5 (−15)	19 (−7)	28 (−2)	40 (4)	41 (5)	25 (−4)	7 (−14)	−8 (−22)	−9 (−23)	−25 (−32)
Average precipitation inches (mm)	0.44 (11)	0.64 (16)	0.93 (24)	1.71 (43)	2.37 (60)	1.28 (33)	2.68 (68)	2.86 (73)	1.46 (37)	1.01 (26)	0.74 (19)	0.60 (15)	16.72 (425)
Average snowfall inches (cm)	6.8 (17)	6.7 (17)	9.9 (25)	5.8 (15)	0.7 (1.8)	0 (0)	0 (0)	0 (0)	0.2 (0.51)	1.9 (4.8)	6.4 (16)	8.4 (21)	46.9 (119)
Source: http://www.wrcc.dri.edu/cgi-bin/cliMAIN.pl?co0898.

== Demographics ==
Historical population
Census	Pop.	Note	%±
1930	237		—
1940	250		5.5%
1950	157		−37.2%
1960	124		−21.0%
1970	70		−43.5%
1980	73		4.3%
1990	58		−20.5%
2000	77		32.8%
2010	74		−3.9%
2020	57		−23.0%
U.S. Decennial Census

As of the census of 2000, there were 77 people, 37 households, and 24 families residing in the town. The population density was 309.6 inhabitants per square mile (119.5/km^{2}). There were 43 housing units at an average density of 172.9 per square mile (66.8/km^{2}). The racial makeup of the town was 97.40% White, 1.30% Native American, and 1.30% from two or more races. Hispanic or Latino of any race were 19.48% of the population.

There were 37 households, out of which 32.4% had children under the age of 18 living with them, 45.9% were married couples living together, 16.2% had a female householder with no husband present, and 35.1% were non-families. 35.1% of all households were made up of individuals, and 18.9% had someone living alone who was 65 years of age or older. The average household size was 2.08 and the average family size was 2.63.

In the town, the population was spread out, with 26.0% under the age of 18, 1.3% from 18 to 24, 29.9% from 25 to 44, 20.8% from 45 to 64, and 22.1% who were 65 years of age or older. The median age was 42 years. For every 100 females, there were 71.1 males. For every 100 females age 18 and over, there were 62.9 males.

The median income for a household in the town was $24,583, and the median income for a family was $23,214. Males had a median income of $19,167 versus $20,000 for females. The per capita income for the town was $14,933. There were 26.9% of families and 25.0% of the population living below the poverty line, including 33.3% of under eighteens and none of those over 64.

== Branson online school ==
In 2001, Branson's K-12 (kindergarten to grade twelve) school, which draws students from up to 30 miles (48 km) from the village, was down to forty-one students. Two teachers (out of a total number of eight) had been laid off. The school building, dating from 1923, was decrepit. J. Alan Aufderheide, the superintendent of the Branson school began developing online classes for students and expanded this idea into an online school for students anywhere in Colorado. The state of Colorado paid for a computer and internet connection for online students as well as per-capita funding to schools. Branson school teachers worked with students online and by telephone.

Branson was not the first online school, but it enjoyed success, quickly becoming the second largest online school in Colorado, enrolling 1,004 students in the fall of 2003. The school attracted a wide variety of students from across the state, but about one-fourth dropped out and the accomplishments of others, based on standardized tests, was below average. For example, in 2004, 48 percent of Branson students scored "unsatisfactory" on math tests, compared with 28 percent state-wide.

In 2025, Branson had 73 students in residence and 331 in its online school. Overall test scores were in the bottom 50 percent statewide. Math proficiency was in the 20-24 percentile; reading was in the 45-49 percentile; and science was in the 21 to 39 percentile.

== See also ==
- Black Mesa
- List of municipalities in Colorado
