= U.S. Route 87 =

Numbered U.S. Highway in the United States

U.S. Route 87
- US 87 highlighted in red

Route information
- Length: 2,004 mi (3,225 km)
- Existed: 1926–present

Major junctions
- South end: SH 238 in Port Lavaca, TX
- I-35 at San Antonio, TX; I-10 from San Antonio to Comfort, TX; I-20 at Big Spring, TX; I-27 from Lubbock to Amarillo, TX; I-40 at Amarillo, TX; I-25 from Raton, NM to Buffalo, WY; I-70 at Denver, CO; I-80 at Cheyenne, WY; I-90 from Buffalo, WY to Billings, MT; I-94 in Billings, MT
- North end: US 2 at Havre, MT

Location
- Country: United States
- States: Texas, New Mexico, Colorado, Wyoming, Montana

Highway system
- United States Numbered Highway System; List; Special; Divided
← US 85	→ US 89

U.S. Highway 87 (US 87) is a north–south United States highway (though it is signed east–west in New Mexico) that runs for 2,005 miles (3,227 km) from northern Montana to southern Texas, making it the longest north–south road to not have a "1" in its number and the third longest north–south road in the country, behind U.S. 41 and U.S. 1. Most of the portion from Billings, Montana to Raton, New Mexico is co-signed along Interstates 90 and 25. It is also co-signed along the majority of I-27 in Texas and future plans call for the interstate to be extended along the US 87 corridor. As of 2004, the highway's northern terminus is in Havre, Montana, at US 2 and its southern terminus is in Port Lavaca, Texas, at SH 238.

== Route description ==
Lengths
	mi	km
TX	797	1,283
NM	100	160
CO	299	481
WY	364	586
MT	444	715
Total	2,004	3,225

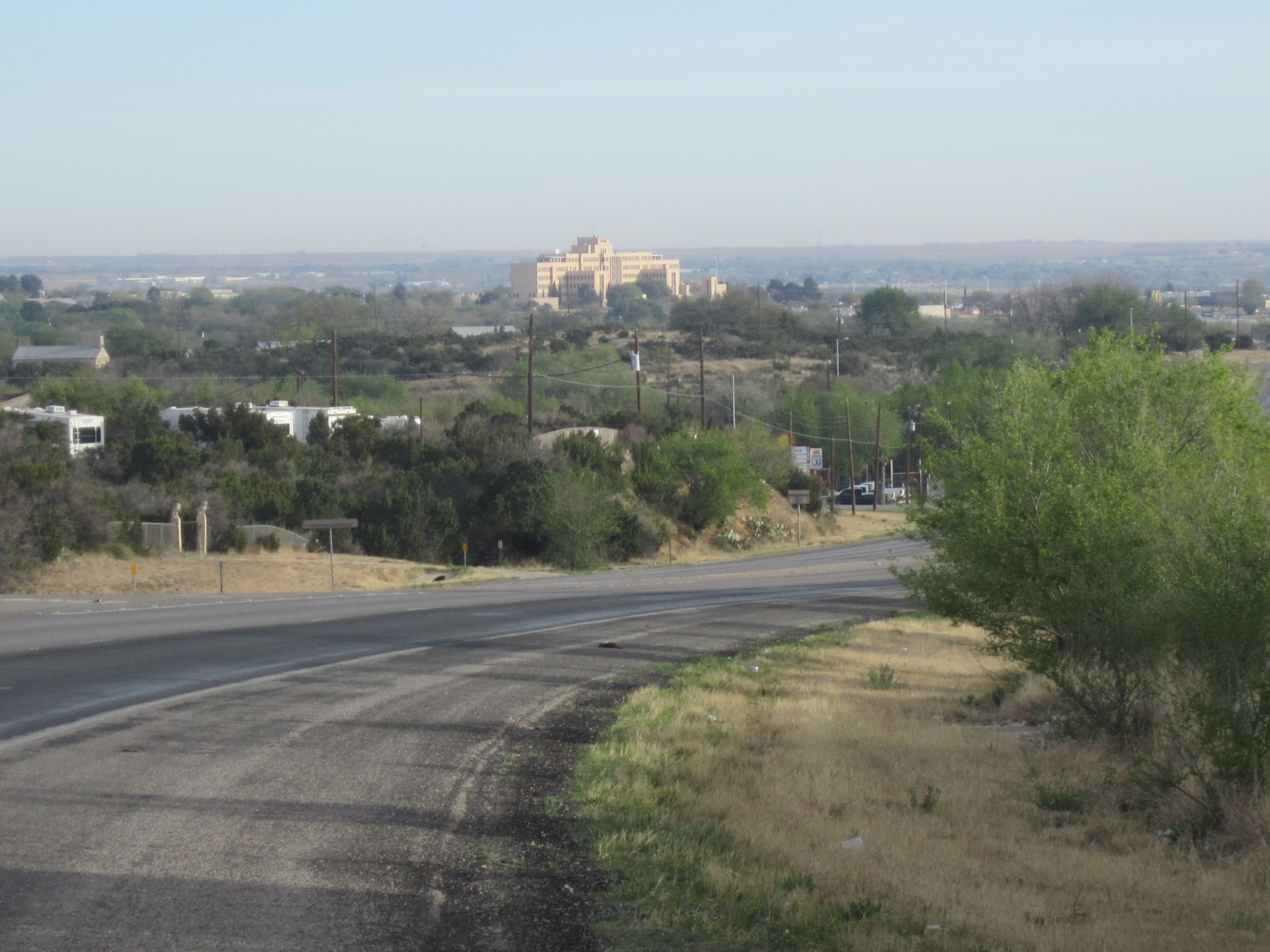
U.S. Route 87 as it approaches Big Spring, Texas, from the south. The Veterans Administration Hospital is shown in the background.

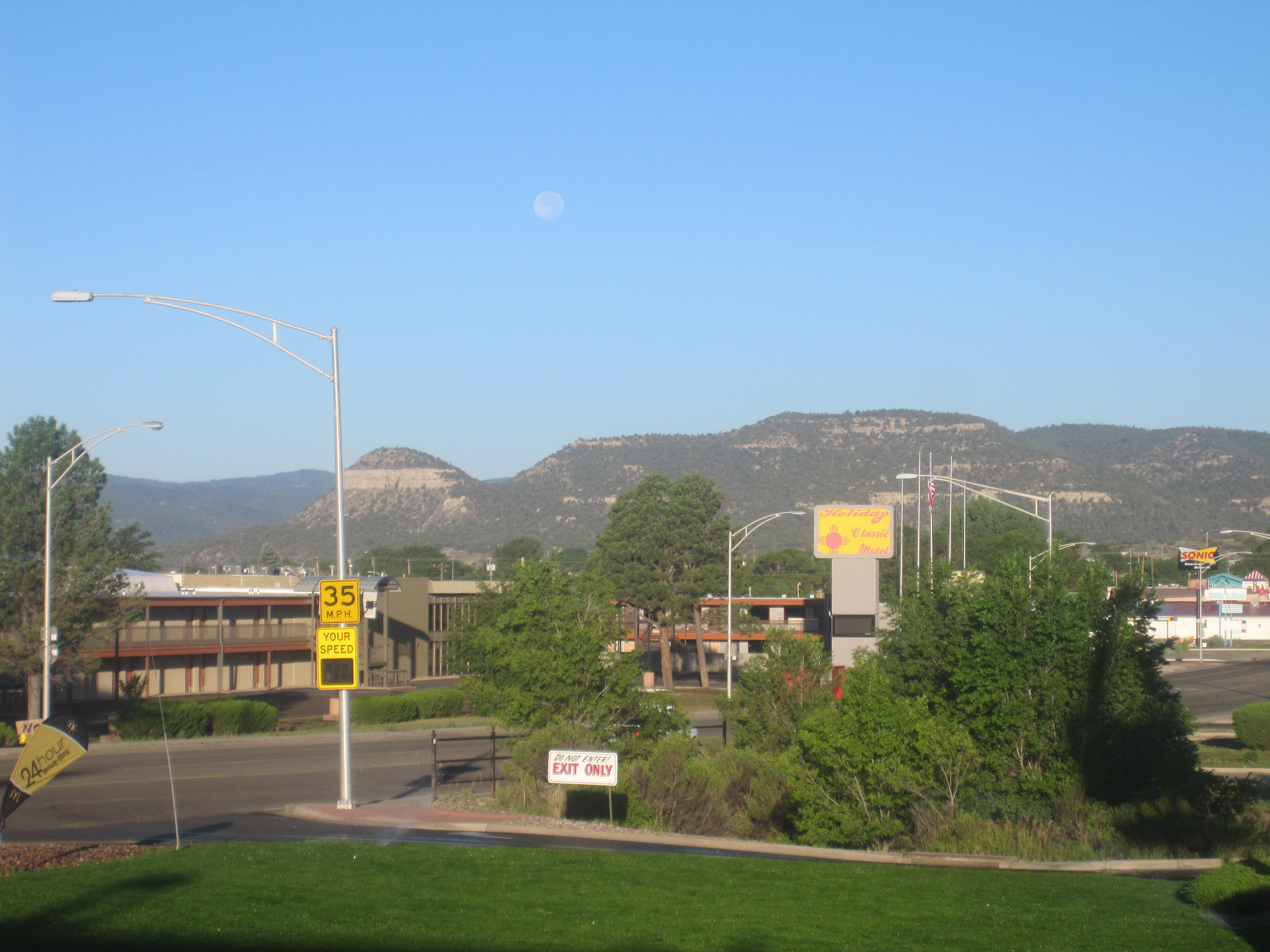
Raton, New Mexico, as it appears from U.S. Route 87, which becomes Interstate 25

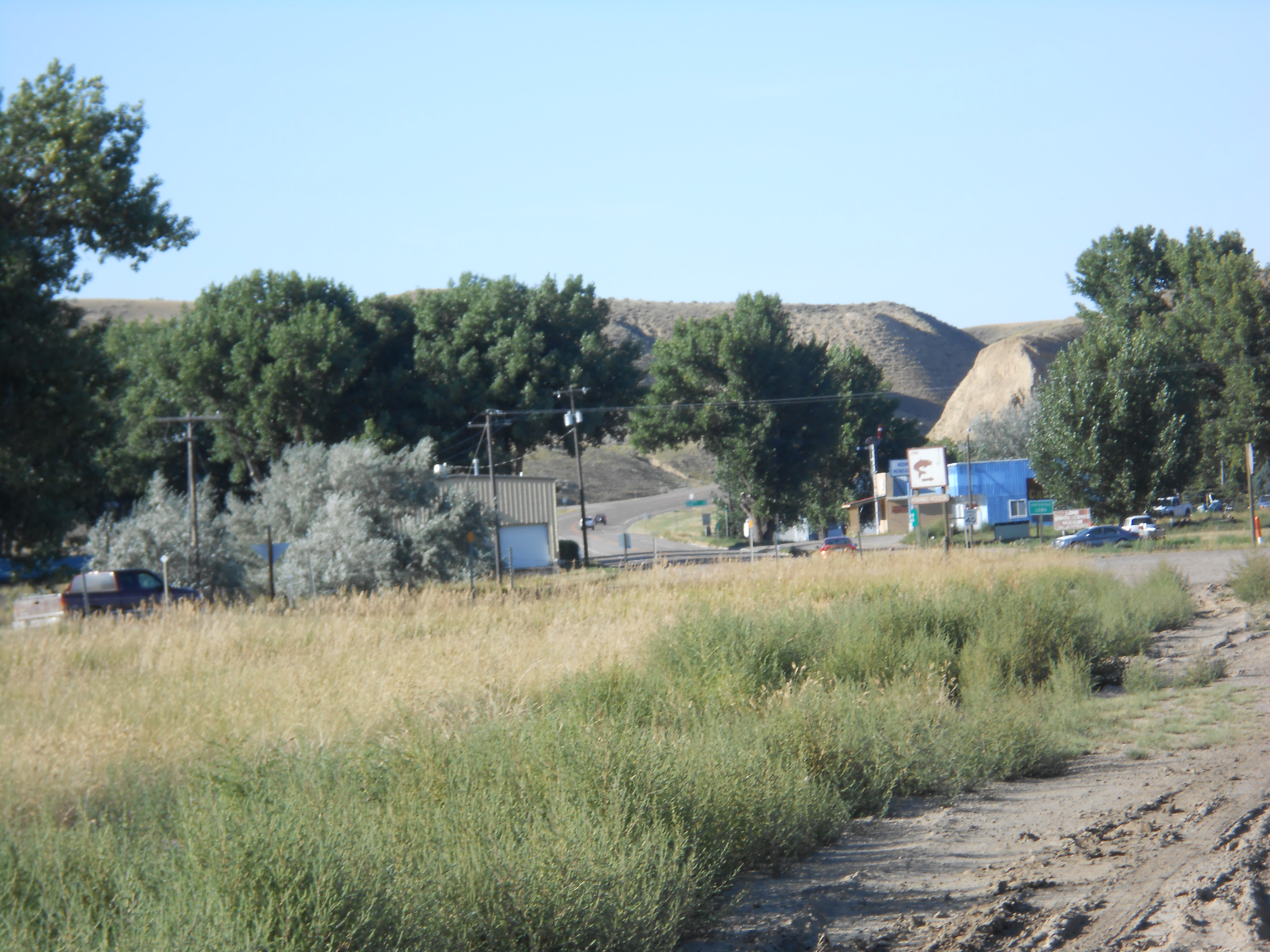
U.S. Route 87 in background, looking north from Loma, Montana.

=== Texas ===
In Texas, US 87 is a north–south highway that begins near the Gulf Coast in Port Lavaca, Texas, and heads north through San Antonio, Lubbock, Amarillo, and Dalhart to the New Mexico state line near Texline.

=== New Mexico ===
US 87 continues in a northwesterly direction in New Mexico and is signed by NMDOT primarily as an east–west route. It merges with US-64 (and thus the Santa Fe Trail National Scenic Byway) in Clayton, shortly after entering New Mexico. It continues to the northwest until Des Moines, when it takes a more westerly approach to Raton. In Raton, it separates from US 64 and merges with Interstate 25 and US 85, with which it remains concurrent through Raton Pass and into Colorado, though it is unsigned on much of the concurrency.

=== Colorado ===
US 87 remains concurrent with I-25 throughout the state of Colorado, which is a rare occurrence for a US highway to have a concurrency with an Interstate in its entirety within state boundaries. It is unsigned through the entire state.

=== Wyoming ===
US 87 remains concurrent with Interstate 25 northward until exit 160 east of Glenrock where it joins US Route 20/US Route 26 from Glenrock to Casper. In Casper it splits from US-20/26 and rejoins I-25 at exit 186. It then remains concurrent with Interstate 25 northward until its terminus with Interstate 90. It then follows I-90 west to exit 44 where it runs up to Sheridan. A portion of US-87 has been washed out for several years along this stretch and "temporary" detour signs are posted directing US-87 traffic along Wyoming Highway 193 through Story.

In Sheridan US-87 rejoins Interstate 90 into Montana.

=== Montana ===
US 87 remains concurrent with Interstate 90 westward until Billings, where it breaks off and heads north. Between Crow Agency and Billings, US 87 and I-90 are merged with US 212. It intersects with (and briefly merges with) US 12 in Roundup and continues north with a slight bend to the northwest until, at Grass Range it takes a sharp turn to the west at an intersection with Montana State Highway 200. US 87 remains concurrent with Montana State Highway 200 until Great Falls. In Lewistown, it merges with US 191 and remains heading generally west. Some ten miles (16 km) out of Lewistown, it breaks with US 191 and merges with Montana State Highway 3, heading generally northwest and merging briefly with US 89 before breaking with all three in Great Falls. US 87 heads northeast then east to Fort Benton and then generally northeast to its terminus with US 2 about two miles (3.2 km) west of Havre.

== History ==
US 87 originally ran northwest out of Great Falls, Montana, towards the eastern border of Glacier National Park. US 87 ran to the Canadian Border at the Piegan Border Crossing. This was changed in 1934, when US Route 89 was diverted to US 87's routing to Glacier Park. US 87 ended in Great Falls until circa 1945 when it was extended to its current northern terminus in Havre, Montana.

U.S. Route 185 was formed in 1926 and extended from US 85 in Cheyenne north to Orin. It became part of a southern extension and realignment of US 87 in 1936.

== Future ==
On March 15, 2022, a bill was signed by President Joe Biden that added the extension of I-27 from its termini in Amarillo and Lubbock, Texas, northward to Raton, New Mexico, and southward to Laredo, Texas, respectively to the Interstate Highway System utilizing the US 87 corridor. The interstate's northern terminus would be at I-25. A bill introduced in 2023 would explicitly designate the extension as I-27 with two auxiliary routes numbered I-227 and I-327. I-227 is proposed to be routed via SH 158 from Sterling City to Midland and SH 349 from Midland to Lamesa; I-327 would utilize US 287 from Dumas to the Oklahoma border. However, after legislation passed through the U.S. Senate in August 2023, I-227 and I-327 were respectively redesignated as I-27W and I-27N, with I-27E replacing the proposed I-27 between Sterling City and Lamesa.

== Major intersections ==
Texas
SH 238 in Port Lavaca
Future I-69 / US 59 in Victoria
US 77 in Victoria
US 183 in Cuero. The highways travel concurrently to southwest of Cuero.
I-410 in San Antonio
I-10 / US 90 in San Antonio. I-10/US 87 travels concurrently to Comfort. US 87/US 90 travels concurrently through San Antonio.
I-37 / US 281 in San Antonio
I-35 / US 90 in San Antonio. I-35/US 87 travels concurrently through San Antonio.
I-410 on the Balcones Heights–San Antonio city line
US 290 in Fredericksburg. The highways travel concurrently through Fredericksburg.
US 377 northwest of Mason. The highways travel concurrently to Brady.
US 190 in Brady. The highways travel concurrently to Brady.
US 283 northwest of Brady
US 83 in Eden
US 277 in San Angelo. The highways travel concurrently through San Angelo.
US 67 / US 277 in San Angelo
I-20 in Big Spring
US 180 south of Los Ybanez. The highways travel concurrently to Lamesa.
US 380 in Tahoka
I-27 in Lubbock. The highways travel concurrently to south of Kress.
US 84 in Lubbock
US 62 in Lubbock
US 82 in Lubbock
US 70 in Plainview
I-27 north-northwest of Tulia. The highways travel concurrently to south-southeast of Happy.
US 60 in Canyon. The highways travel concurrently to Amarillo.
I-27 north of Canyon. The highways travel concurrently to Amarillo.
I-27 / I-40 / US 287 in Amarillo. US 87/US 287 travels concurrently through Amarillo.
US 60 in Amarillo
US 287 in Amarillo. The highways travel concurrently to Dumas.
US 385 in Hartley. The highways travel concurrently to Dalhart.
US 54 in Dalhart
New Mexico
US 56 / US 64 / US 412 in Clayton. US 64/US 87 travels concurrently to Raton.
I-25 / US 64 / US 85 in Raton. I-25/US 87 travels concurrently to southeast of Glenrock, Wyoming. US 85/US 87 travels concurrently to Fountain, Colorado.
Colorado
US 160 in Trinidad. The highways travel concurrently to Walsenburg.
US 50 in Pueblo. The highways travel concurrently through Pueblo.
US 85 in Fountain.
US 24 in Colorado Springs. The highways travel concurrently through Colorado Springs.
US 85 in Colorado Springs. The highways travel concurrently to Castle Rock.
I-225 in Denver
US 285 in Denver
US 85 in Denver. The highways travel concurrently through Denver.
US 6 in Denver. The highways travel concurrently through Denver.
US 40 / US 287 in Denver
I-70 / US 6 / US 85 in Denver
I-76 southeast of Twin Lakes
I-270 / US 36 on the Twin Lakes–Sherrelwood–Welby line
US 34 in Loveland
Wyoming
I-80 south-southwest of Cheyenne
US 30 southwest of Cheyenne
US 85 in Cheyenne. The highways travel concurrently to Ranchettes.
US 26 west-southwest of Dwyer Junction. The highways travel concurrently to the Casper–Hartrandt city line.
US 18 / US 20 in Orin. US 20/US 87 travels concurrently to the Casper–Hartrandt city line.
I-25 in Casper. The highways travel concurrently to north-northeast of Buffalo.
US 16 in Buffalo
I-25 / I-90 north-northeast of Buffalo. I-90/US 87 travels concurrently to Lockwood.
US 14 in Sheridan. The highways travel concurrently to northeast of Ranchester.
Montana
US 212 in Crow Agency. The highways travel concurrently to Lockwood.
I-94 in Lockwood
US 12 north of Klein. The highways travel concurrently to Roundup.
US 191 in Lewistown. The highways travel concurrently to west-northwest of Moore.
US 89 south-southeast of Armington. The highways travel concurrently to Great Falls.
US 2 northeast of Herron

== See also ==
- Special routes of U.S. Route 87
- U.S. Highway 187 (decommissioned)
- U.S. Highway 287

Browse numbered routes
← US 85	NM	→ NM 88
