= Clayton, New Mexico =

- Town
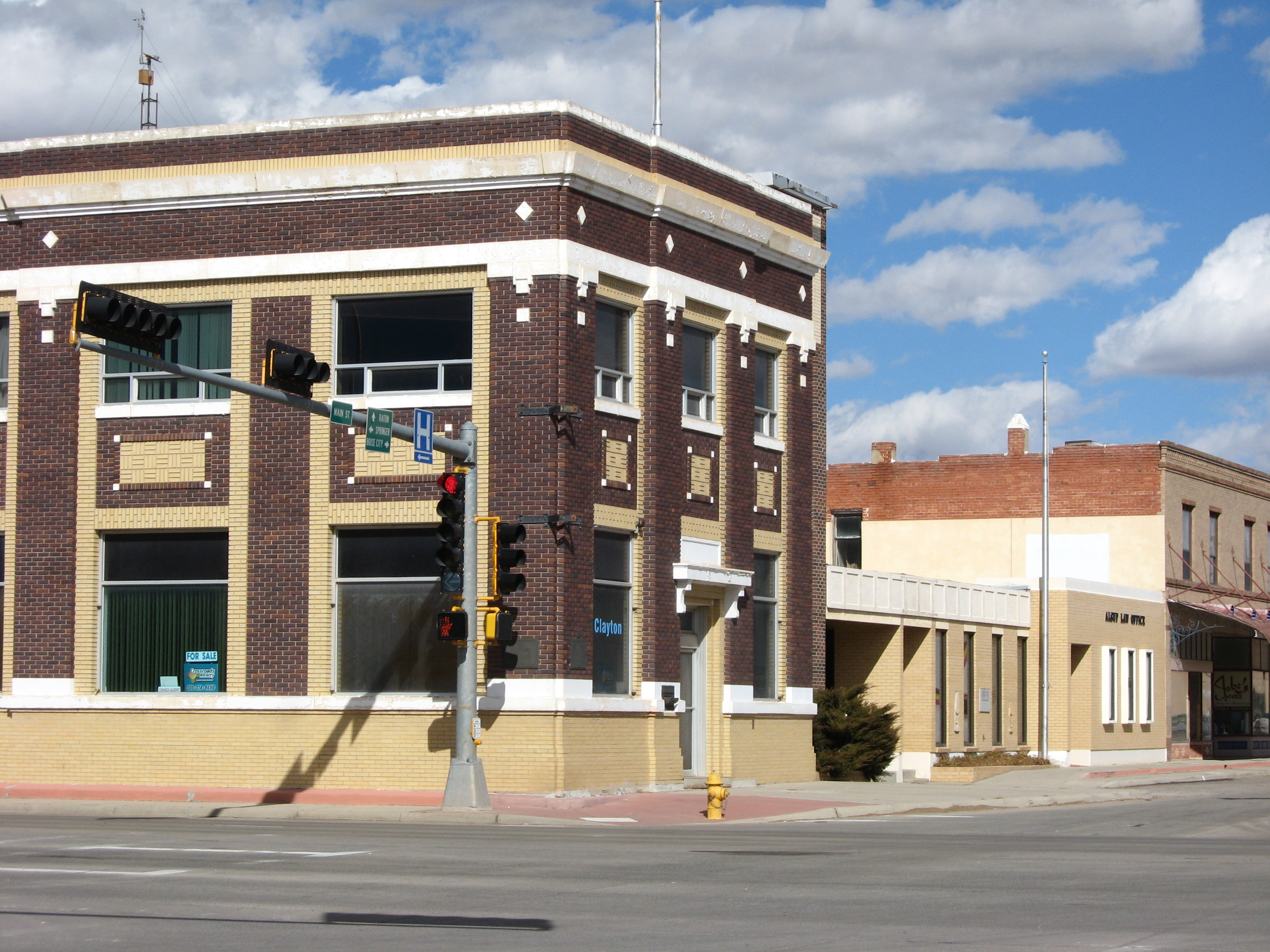
- Main Street (2008)

- Location of Clayton within Union County and New Mexico

- Location within the United States
- Coordinates: 36°26′24″N 103°08′22″W
- Country: United States
- State: New Mexico
- County: Union

Area
  - Total: 7.80 sq mi (20.19 km^{2})
  - Land: 7.77 sq mi (20.12 km^{2})
  - Water: 0.027 sq mi (0.07 km^{2})
- Elevation: 4,967 ft (1,514 m)

Population (2020)
  - Total: 2,643
  - Density: 340.2/sq mi (131.4/km^{2})
- Time zone: UTC-07:00 (MST)
  - Summer (DST): UTC-06:00 (MDT)
- ZIP code: 88415
- Area code: 575
- FIPS code: 35-15720
- GNIS ID: 2413209

Clayton is a town in and the county seat of Union County, New Mexico, United States. As of the 2020 census, Clayton had a population of 2,643. Clayton is home to the historic Luna Theater, a municipal airport, Clayton High School, and Herzstein Memorial Museum. Clayton Lake State Park is about 15 miles away.

== History ==
=== Early history ===
Native Americans were present in the area of Clayton for at least 10,000 years, as evidenced by the findings at the Folsom site about 55 miles northwest of Clayton, near the village of Folsom.

The first Spanish explorers in the 16th century found the region inhabited by the Apache people. In the 18th and early to mid-19th century, the Comanche controlled this region. The Spanish called their domain Comancheria.

The Cimarron Cutoff of the Santa Fe Trail brought some of the first settlers through the Clayton region. The Santa Fe Trail was first established in 1821 after Spanish rule was evicted from Mexico which opened up trade between Santa Fe and the United States. William Becknell, also known as the Father of the Santa Fe Trail, became the first person to utilize the Santa Fe Trail as a trade route between the state of Missouri and Santa Fe. He established the Cimarron Cutoff, also known as the Cimarron Route, as a faster route between countries as the Cimarron Route shortened the Trail by more than 100 miles. The Cimarron Cutoff went straight through the Clayton region where travelers used the Rabbit Ear Mountains as a guiding landmark. Eventually travelers along the trail began to appreciate the rich soil around Clayton and the rolling green hills which were perfect for raising livestock.

The Goodnight-Loving Trail also passed through the area (bringing cattle north from Texas) starting in the late 1860s, but eventually cattle ranchers and sheepherders established ranches in the Clayton area itself, though they were large and far apart. That changed when the Fort Worth and Denver City Railroad came to the area in 1888. Stephen Dorsey, a nearby rancher, received the rights to the area where the railroad ran. His range manager, John C. Hill laid out a town site, and named it in 1887 for Clayton C. Dorsey (1871–1948), son of Senator Stephen W. Dorsey of Arkansas, who had established the nearby Triangle Dot Ranch in Union and Colfax counties.

In 1892, the saloon of what would later become the Hotel Eklund was built, and by 1894 the saloon featured a front and back bar, pool and carom tables, monte game tables, a crap table, and a poker table. By 1898, the building was further expanded to add a hotel.

=== Twentieth Century ===
On April 26, 1901, outlaw Black Jack Ketchum has hanged in Clayton. He was decapitated by the hanging. US President Theodore Roosevelt visited Clayton on April 14, 1905.

N. Faustin Gallegos owned and edited El Fenix newspaper in Clayton, was an interpreter, schools superintendent, and delegate to the 1908 Republican National Convention in Chicago.

In 1928, the main street of Clayton was paved and street lighting was added.

Clayton and the rest of Northeastern New Mexico was hit hard by the Dust Bowl of the 1930s; however, the era was also a time of renewal and rebuilding in the community, in large part due to the work of the Works Project Administration in the community.

Clayton was hit by a "black roller" (giant dust cloud) that measured 1500 feet high and a mile across on May 28, 1937.

In 1999, the dining room and saloon of the old Eklund Hotel was reopened.

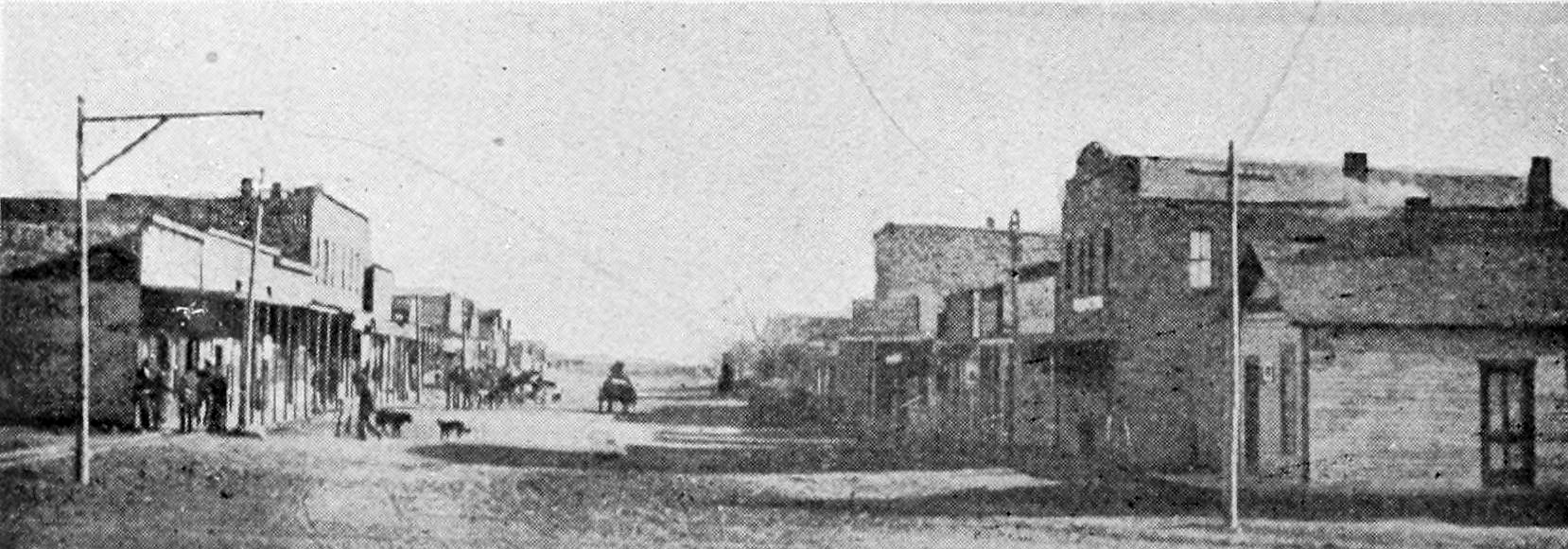
Clayton (1904)

=== Twenty-first century ===
The Eklund hotel reopened on July 3, 2011.

== Geography ==
According to the United States Census Bureau, the town has a total area of 4.7 square miles (12 km^{2}), all land. Clayton has an elevation of approximately 5,050 feet (1,540 m) above sea level. It is located about 130 miles (210 km) northwest of Amarillo, Texas. Clayton is considered to be in the Plains region of New Mexico. This region stretches to the Sangre de Cristo Mountains down to the Guadalupe Mountains. Clayton is located in the northeast corner of New Mexico, 10 miles (16 km) from the border of Texas and 11 miles (18 km) from the border of the Oklahoma panhandle. Clayton is also located near two parks, Clayton Lake State Park, and Capulin Volcano National Monument. Not far away is Black Mesa State Park in Oklahoma. A carbon dioxide field called Bravo Dome can be found near Clayton and stretches nearly 1 million acres.

=== Climate ===
Clayton has a typical New Mexico cool semi-arid climate (Köppen BSk) with hot summers and cool, dry winters. The normal monthly mean temperature ranges from 34.8 °F (1.6 °C) in December to 74.7 °F (23.7 °C) in July; on average, annually, there are 41 days with a maximum at or above 90 °F (32.2 °C), 13 days with a maximum that remains at or below freezing, and 2.2 days with a minimum at or below 0 °F (−17.8 °C). Precipitation is low and usually confined to the monsoon season from June to September when thunderstorms are frequent; the annual mean precipitation is 15.8 in (400 mm). Winter weather can vary greatly from warm and windy due to the influence of the chinook, to frigid and snowy when Arctic air moves southward from Canada. The seasonal (July through June of the following year) normal total snowfall accumulation is 28 in (71 cm), mostly occurring from November to March, occasionally in April, and very rarely does measurable snowfall occur in September, October or May.

Record temperatures range from −21 °F (−29 °C) on January 4, 1959, to 105 °F (41 °C) on July 30, 1934, and June 27, 1924; the record cold maximum is −1 °F (−18 °C) on January 11, 1963, and the day preceding the all-time record low, while, conversely, the record warm minimum is 74 °F (23 °C) on July 26, 1917.

Climate data for Clayton Municipal Airpark, New Mexico, 1991–2020 normals (Note: Mean monthly maxima and minima (i.e. the expected highest and lowest temperature readings at any point during the year or given month) calculated based on data at said location from 1991 to 2020.), extremes 1896–present
Month	Jan	Feb	Mar	Apr	May	Jun	Jul	Aug	Sep	Oct	Nov	Dec	Year
Record high °F (°C)	80 (27)	83 (28)	94 (34)	92 (33)	99 (37)	105 (41)	105 (41)	102 (39)	99 (37)	93 (34)	86 (30)	83 (28)	105 (41)
Mean maximum °F (°C)	70.0 (21.1)	72.5 (22.5)	79.9 (26.6)	84.3 (29.1)	91.1 (32.8)	98.2 (36.8)	99.3 (37.4)	96.3 (35.7)	92.5 (33.6)	86.6 (30.3)	77.3 (25.2)	70.1 (21.2)	100.6 (38.1)
Mean daily maximum °F (°C)	49.5 (9.7)	52.0 (11.1)	60.0 (15.6)	67.3 (19.6)	76.4 (24.7)	86.4 (30.2)	90.0 (32.2)	86.6 (30.3)	80.3 (26.8)	69.1 (20.6)	57.7 (14.3)	48.6 (9.2)	68.7 (20.4)
Daily mean °F (°C)	35.5 (1.9)	37.5 (3.1)	44.9 (7.2)	52.0 (11.1)	61.5 (16.4)	71.2 (21.8)	75.4 (24.1)	73.1 (22.8)	66.4 (19.1)	54.7 (12.6)	43.7 (6.5)	35.3 (1.8)	54.3 (12.4)
Mean daily minimum °F (°C)	21.4 (−5.9)	23.0 (−5.0)	29.8 (−1.2)	36.8 (2.7)	46.6 (8.1)	56.1 (13.4)	60.8 (16.0)	59.7 (15.4)	52.5 (11.4)	40.3 (4.6)	29.7 (−1.3)	22.0 (−5.6)	39.9 (4.4)
Mean minimum °F (°C)	5.6 (−14.7)	8.3 (−13.2)	15.0 (−9.4)	23.9 (−4.5)	33.7 (0.9)	47.0 (8.3)	54.5 (12.5)	53.7 (12.1)	40.7 (4.8)	24.9 (−3.9)	14.4 (−9.8)	4.9 (−15.1)	0.0 (−17.8)
Record low °F (°C)	−21 (−29)	−18 (−28)	−11 (−24)	7 (−14)	20 (−7)	31 (−1)	40 (4)	42 (6)	26 (−3)	6 (−14)	−10 (−23)	−14 (−26)	−21 (−29)
Average precipitation inches (mm)	0.33 (8.4)	0.30 (7.6)	0.91 (23)	1.12 (28)	1.85 (47)	1.97 (50)	2.81 (71)	3.08 (78)	1.75 (44)	1.13 (29)	0.45 (11)	0.42 (11)	16.12 (408)
Average snowfall inches (cm)	3.7 (9.4)	2.7 (6.9)	3.4 (8.6)	1.3 (3.3)	0.5 (1.3)	0.0 (0.0)	0.0 (0.0)	0.0 (0.0)	0.0 (0.0)	1.2 (3.0)	2.7 (6.9)	6.8 (17)	22.3 (56.4)
Average precipitation days (≥ 0.01 in)	3.1	3.3	4.6	5.5	6.7	7.4	9.9	9.3	6.3	4.4	3.4	3.7	67.6
Average snowy days (≥ 0.1 in)	3.2	2.9	1.9	1.1	0.3	0.0	0.0	0.0	0.0	0.7	1.8	3.4	15.3
Source 1: NOAA
Source 2: National Weather Service

== Demographics ==
Historical population
Census	Pop.	Note	%±
1910	970		—
1920	2,157		122.4%
1930	2,518		16.7%
1940	3,188		26.6%
1950	3,515		10.3%
1960	3,314		−5.7%
1970	2,931		−11.6%
1980	2,968		1.3%
1990	2,484		−16.3%
2000	2,524		1.6%
2010	2,980		18.1%
2020	2,643		−11.3%
U.S. Decennial Census

=== 2020 census ===
As of the 2020 census, Clayton had a population of 2,643. The median age was 42.3 years. 18.2% of residents were under the age of 18 and 20.1% of residents were 65 years of age or older. For every 100 females there were 136.2 males, and for every 100 females age 18 and over there were 139.7 males age 18 and over.

0.0% of residents lived in urban areas, while 100.0% lived in rural areas.

There were 980 households in Clayton, of which 26.8% had children under the age of 18 living in them. Of all households, 36.7% were married-couple households, 22.1% were households with a male householder and no spouse or partner present, and 32.2% were households with a female householder and no spouse or partner present. About 33.2% of all households were made up of individuals and 16.9% had someone living alone who was 65 years of age or older.

There were 1,216 housing units, of which 19.4% were vacant. The homeowner vacancy rate was 4.3% and the rental vacancy rate was 13.0%.

Racial composition as of the 2020 census
Race	Number	Percent
White	1,553	58.8%
Black or African American	60	2.3%
American Indian and Alaska Native	73	2.8%
Asian	6	0.2%
Native Hawaiian and Other Pacific Islander	3	0.1%
Some other race	290	11.0%
Two or more races	658	24.9%
Hispanic or Latino (of any race)	1,311	49.6%

=== 2010 census ===
As of the 2010 census, there were 2,980 people, 1,025 households (only 77.8% of the population was living in households), and 623 family households residing in the town. The population density was 535.7 inhabitants per square mile (206.8/km^{2}). There were 1,289 housing units at an average density of 273.6 units per square mile (105.6 units/km^{2}). The racial makeup of the town was 75.9% White (43.5% non-Hispanic white), 2.7% Native American, 2.6% black or African American, 0.5% Asian, 15.6% from some other races, and 2.6% from two or more races. Hispanic or Latino of any race were 51.1% of the population.

=== 2000 census ===
As of the 2000 census, there were 1,079 households, out of which 30.5% had children under the age of 18 living with them, 47.6% were married couples living together, 11.7% had a female householder with no husband present, and 35.9% were non-families. 33.7% of all households were made up of individuals, and 18.2% had someone living alone who was 65 years of age or older. The average household size was 2.32 and the average family size was 2.99.

In the town, the population was spread out, with 27.7% under the age of 18, 6.3% from 18 to 24, 23.8% from 25 to 44, 23.6% from 45 to 64, and 18.7% who were 65 years of age or older. The median age was 40 years. For every 100 females, there were 95.7 males. For every 100 females age 18 and over, there were 92.4 males.

The median income for a household in the town was $25,600, and the median income for a family was $30,109. Males had a median income of $26,554 versus $17,054 for females. The per capita income for the town was $13,967. About 14.2% of families and 17.9% of the population were below the poverty line, including 31.4% of those under age 18 and 9.1% of those age 65 or over.

== Economy ==
Clayton was originally built up as a regional trading hub on the Santa Fe Trail. Currently, the economy is largely supported by the agriculture and tourism industries.

== Community ==
Clayton holds a parade each Independence Day. The Herzstein Memorial Museum, run by the Union County Historical Society, has artifacts including an exhibit from the Work Projects Administration that was active in the area. An official interpretative center of the Santa Fe Trail, the Herzstein focuses upon county and regional history. Clayton Lake State Park, featuring a fishing lake and an extensive trackway of fossilized dinosaur footprints, is located 15 miles (24 km) north of town.

One of the oldest movie theaters in America stands in Clayton. Opened in 1916 as The Mission Theater, the Luna Theater is still in operation today, showing a different movie each weekend. “The Mission style exterior, and the interior, with its Art Deco style touches, has been painstakingly restored and refurbished over the years, including all new projection equipment.” Although refurbished, much of the design is original, with original seating, light fixtures, and ticket booth. "Morris Herzstein built the theater and adjacent business block in 1916 after a disastrous fire wiped out his headquarters mercantile store... Before the Great Depression, the Mission Theater flourished and provided the magic of movies in Clayton, including memorable Christmas matinees offered free to children where Santa Claus would appear and give small presents to the crowd.” In 1935, T.F. Murphy bought the Mission Theater, renamed it the Luna Theater, and added some renovations. The Luna Theater is one of the most historic theaters in the country, landing a special place on the National Register of Historic Places in 2007.

== Transportation ==
Highway connections include US Route 412 and US Route 64 concurrently through town running generally southwest to northeast, as well as US Route 87 running generally northwest to southeast.

Clayton Municipal Airpark two miles east of town (KCAO, or FAA Identifier CAO), opened in December 1946, and features two runways the longer of which is 6,307 by 75 feet (1,922 by 23 meters). Currently there is no scheduled passenger service.

Railroad freight service is provided by BNSF. Passenger service ceased on September 11, 1967.

== Gallery ==
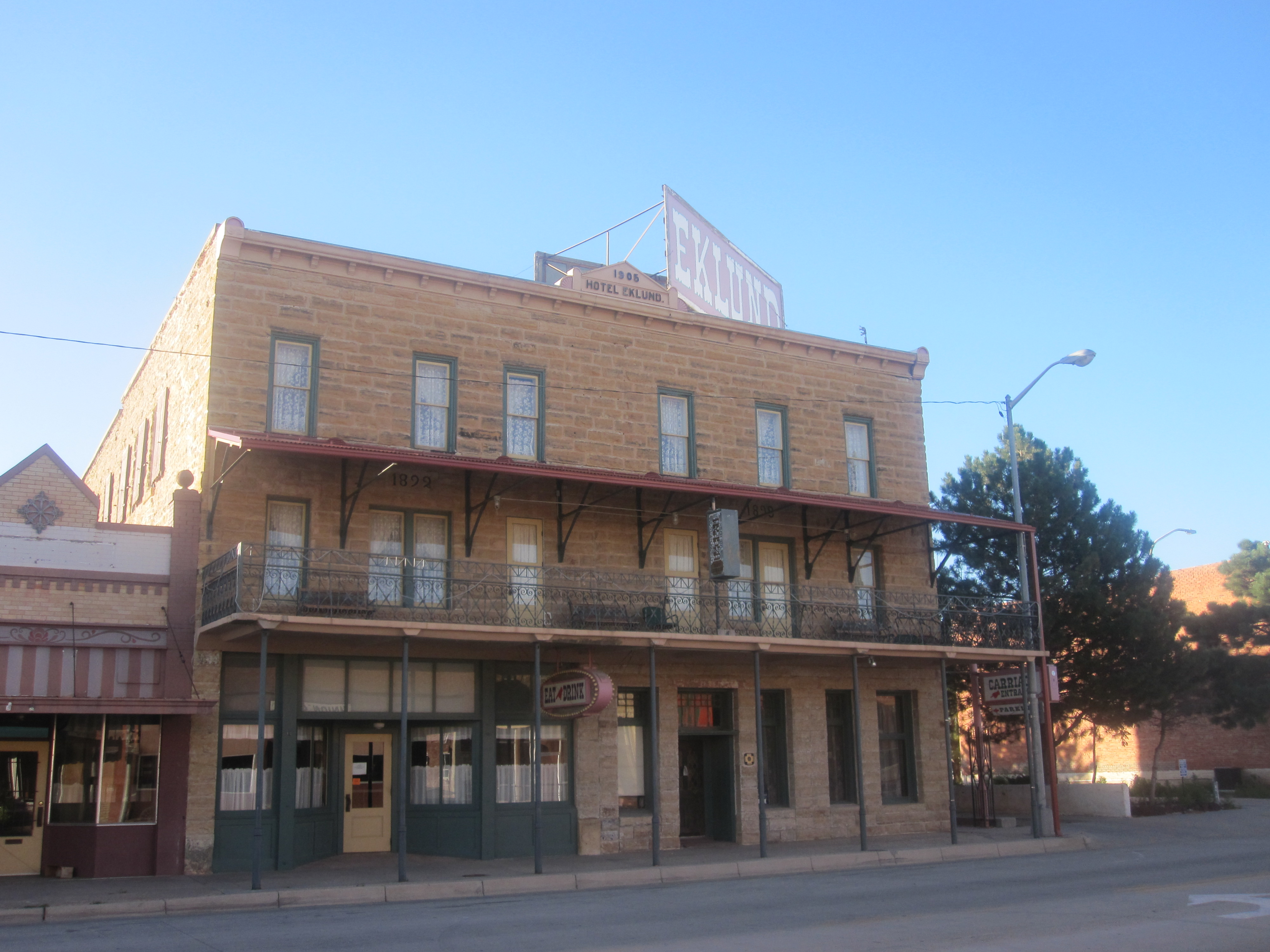
Eklund Hotel (established 1905), 2010

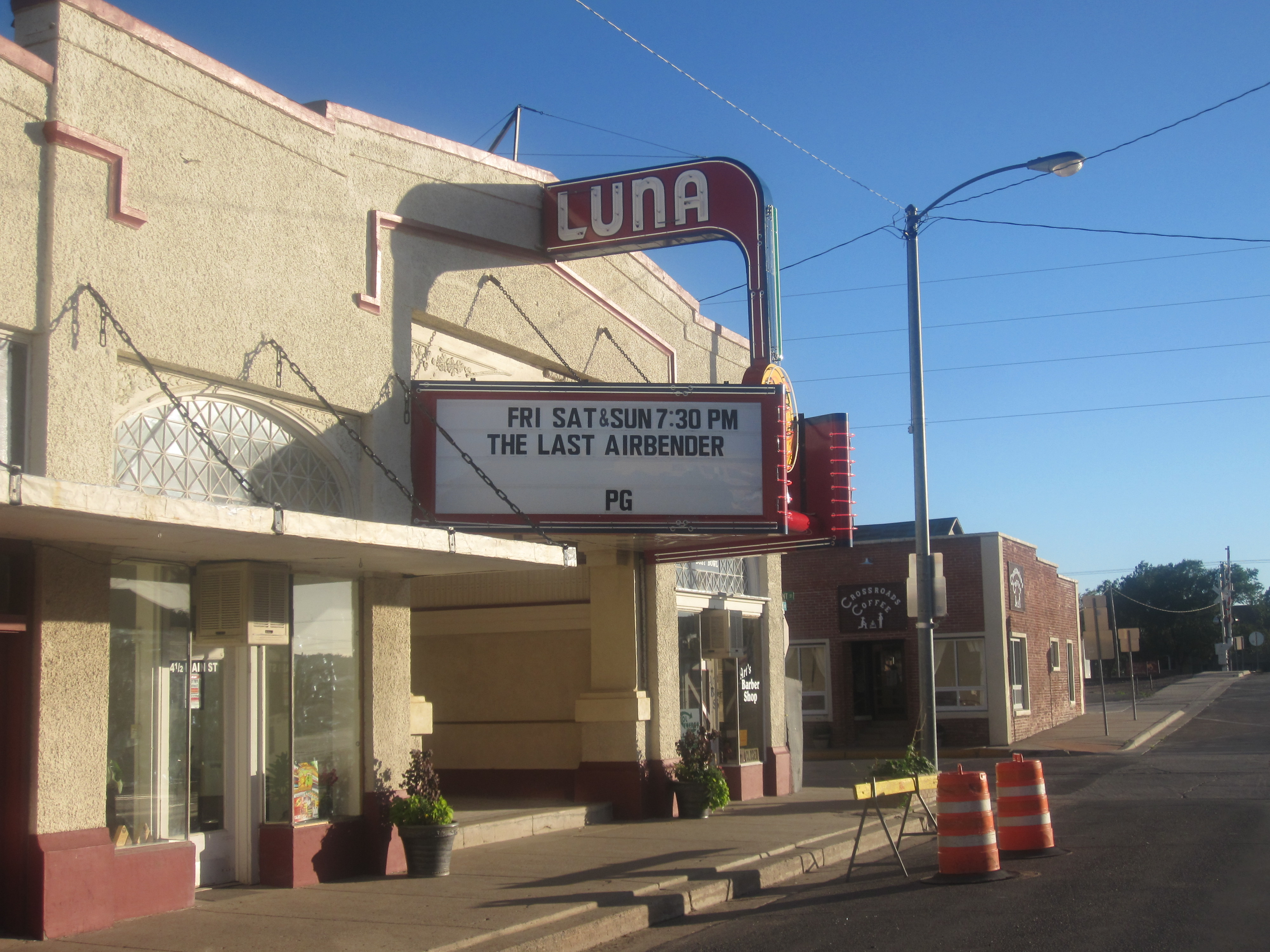
Luna Theater, 2010

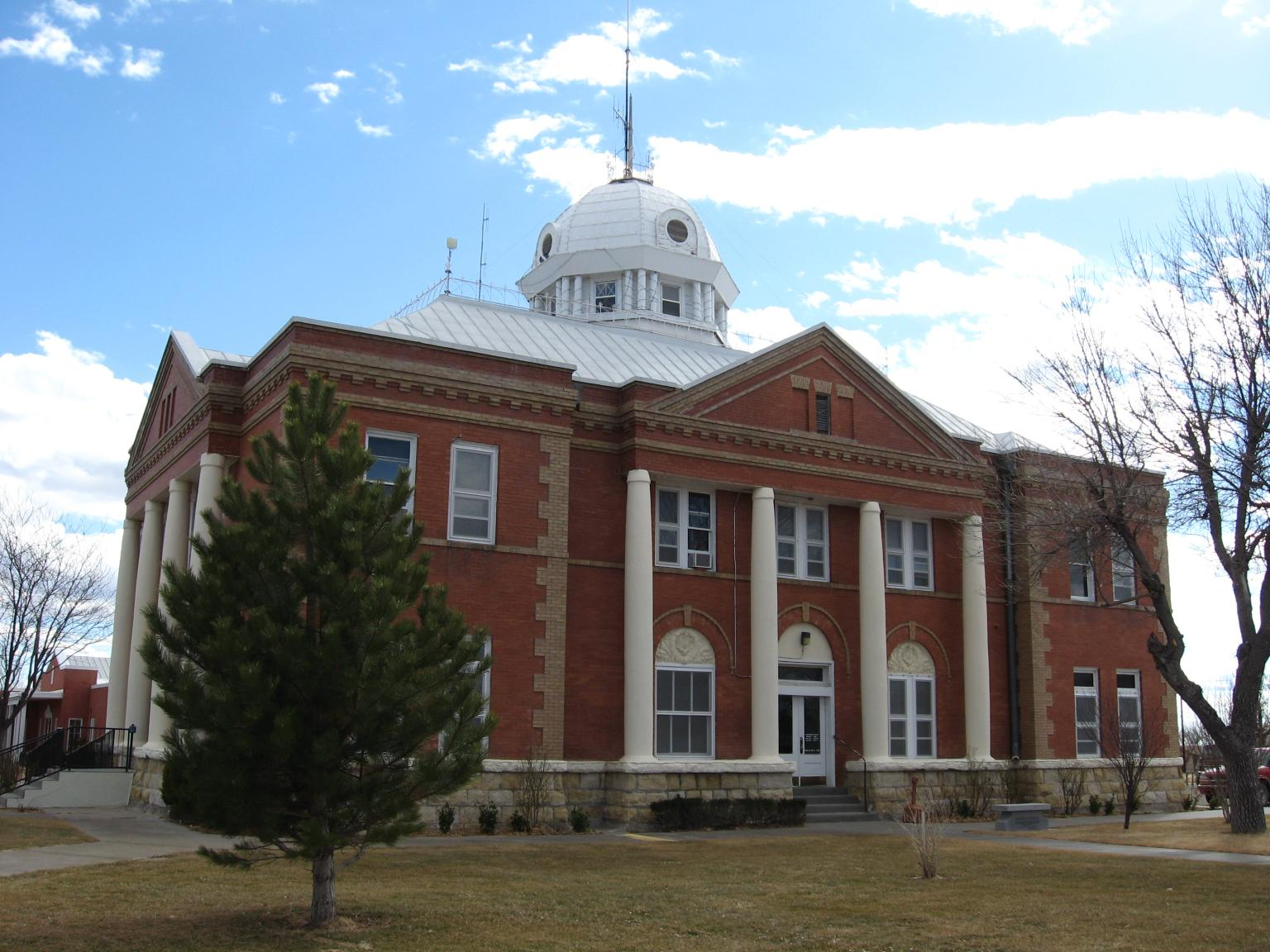
Union County Courthouse, 2008

== See also ==
- Rabbit Ears
