= Raton Municipal Airport =

Airport in New Mexico, United States

Raton Municipal Airport Crews Field
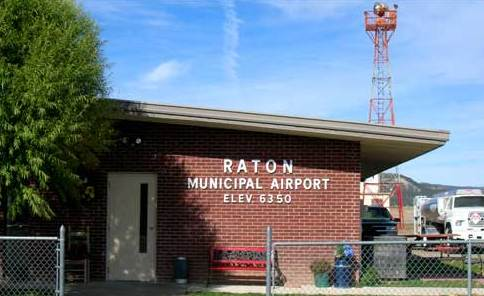
- IATA: RTN; ICAO: KRTN; FAA LID: RTN

Summary
- Airport type: Public
- Owner: City of Raton
- Serves: Raton, New Mexico
- Elevation AMSL: 6,352 ft (1,936 m)
- Coordinates: 36°44′30″N 104°30′08″W

Map
- Location within New Mexico

Runways
| Direction | Length | | Surface |
| Direction | ft | m | Surface |
|---|---|---|---|
| 2/20 | 7,615 | 2,321 | Asphalt |
| 7/25 | 4,425 | 1,349 | Asphalt |

Statistics (2022)
- Aircraft operations (year ending 4/22/2022): 7,000
- Based aircraft: 16
- Source: Federal Aviation Administration

Raton Municipal Airport (IATA: RTN, ICAO: KRTN, FAA LID: RTN) (Crews Field) is 12 miles southwest of Raton, in Colfax County, New Mexico, United States. The National Plan of Integrated Airport Systems for 2011–2015 called it a general aviation facility.

Continental Airlines served Raton with Douglas DC-3s for about four years starting in 1949-50. Raton was one of several stops on its flights between Denver, Albuquerque, and El Paso. Commuter carriers have also served Raton; Trans Central Airlines in 1969/1970 had a similar route to Continental's, S.I. Airways operated commuter flights to Denver and Amarillo in 1973 and 1974, and Territorial Airlines flew to Albuquerque via Las Vegas, NM, in 1990.

== Facilities ==
Raton Municipal Airport covers 1,280 acres (518 ha) at an elevation of 6,352 feet (1,936 m). It has two asphalt runways: 2/20 is 7,615 by 75 feet (2,321 x 23 m) and 7/25 is 4,425 by 75 feet (1,349 x 23 m).

In the year ending April 22, 2022, the airport had about 7,000 aircraft operations, average 134 per week: 83% general aviation, 11% military, and 6% air taxi; 16 aircraft were then based at this airport: all single-engined.

== Accidents and incidents ==
On January 17, 2018, a Bell UH-1H Iroquois helicopter crashed shortly after take-off from Raton while on a flight to Folsom, New Mexico. Five of the six people on board were killed. The survivor was seriously injured.
