= Soapstone Prairie Natural Area =

Park and conservation area in Larimer County, Colorado

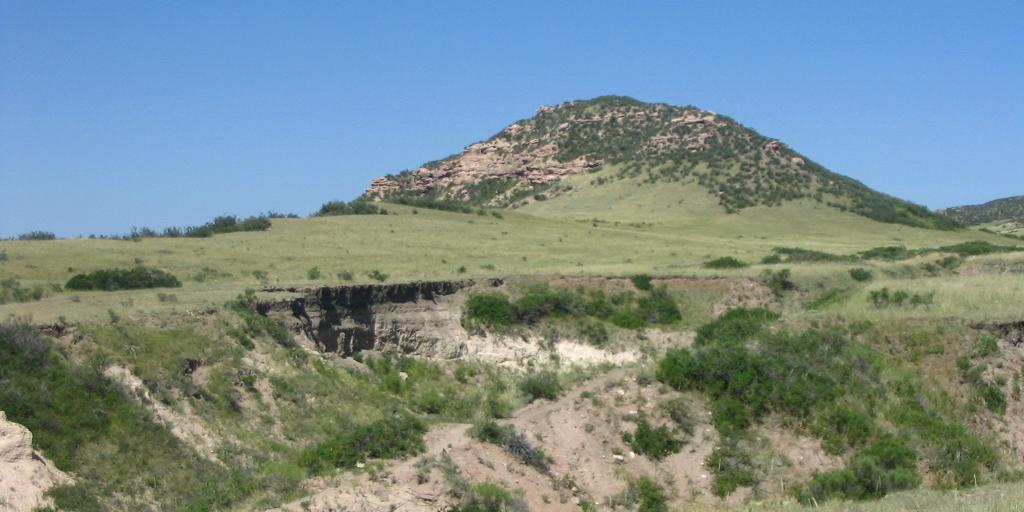
- The arroyo surrounding the Lindenmeier archaeological site (Folsom culture) on Soapstone Prairie Natural Area north of Fort Collins, Colorado, and southwest of Cheyenne, Wyoming.

- Location within Colorado
- Location: Larimer County, Colorado, United States
- Nearest city: Fort Collins
- Coordinates: 40°58′48″N 105°03′44″W
- Area: 28 mi^{2} (73 km^{2})
- Established: 2004
- Website: Official website

Soapstone Prairie Natural Area is a 28-square-mile (73 km^{2}) park and conservation area in northeastern Larimer County, Colorado, United States. The City of Fort Collins purchased the land for Soapstone Prairie Natural Area in 2004, which was opened to the public in 2009.

== Ecology ==
The natural habitat of eastern Colorado was the shortgrass prairie. Over the past 150 years, much of the land was used for agriculture. Much of the remaining 40 percent of shortgrass prairie is degraded and fragmented due to neighboring cities, towns, and farms.

=== Reintroduced black-footed ferrets ===
In 2014, 59 endangered black-footed ferrets, whose main source of food is prairie dogs, were reintroduced in the area. On July 2, 2025, sylvatic plague was confirmed in the prairie dogs on site, threatening the primary food source of the ferrets.

=== Reintroduced bison ===
In 2015, genetically valuable bison from Yellowstone National Park were introduced onto the contiguous lands of Soapstone Prairie Natural Area and Red Mountain Open Space. The Natural Resources Department of Larimer County recognized that grazing was important for soil, vegetation, and overall ecological balance and that bison were the primary historical grazers before being extirpated. The managers wanted to create a herd that could act as a seed herd that would help establish bison with heritage genetics. Establishing a conservation herd became a collaborative effort of Larimer County, the City of Fort Collins, the U.S. Department of Agriculture’s Animal and Plant Health Inspection Service (APHIS), and Colorado State University. Ten bison were released into a 1,000-acre fenced site (400 ha). By 2021, the herd had grown to about 120 and were grazing on approximately 2,500 fenced acres (1,000 ha) of shortgrass prairie. In cooperation with partner organizations, some of the bison have been sent to Native American tribes in Wisconsin, New Mexico, Montana, South Dakota, and Minnesota, where they are important for cultural endeavors and food sovereignty, to start their own herds.

== Archaeological site ==
The Lindenmeier site, named for the previous Lindenmeier Ranch, is a Folsom archaeological site on the Soapstone Prairie Natural Area. The site contains the most extensive Folsom culture campsite yet found with an uncorrected averaged radiocarbon date of 10,660±60 B.P., or 8,710 B.C. The site was declared a National Historic Landmark on January 20, 1961.

== See also ==
- Fort Collins, Colorado
