= 2018 Sapphire Aviation Bell UH-1 crash =

Helicopter crash

Coordinates: 36°52′25″N 104°26′24″W

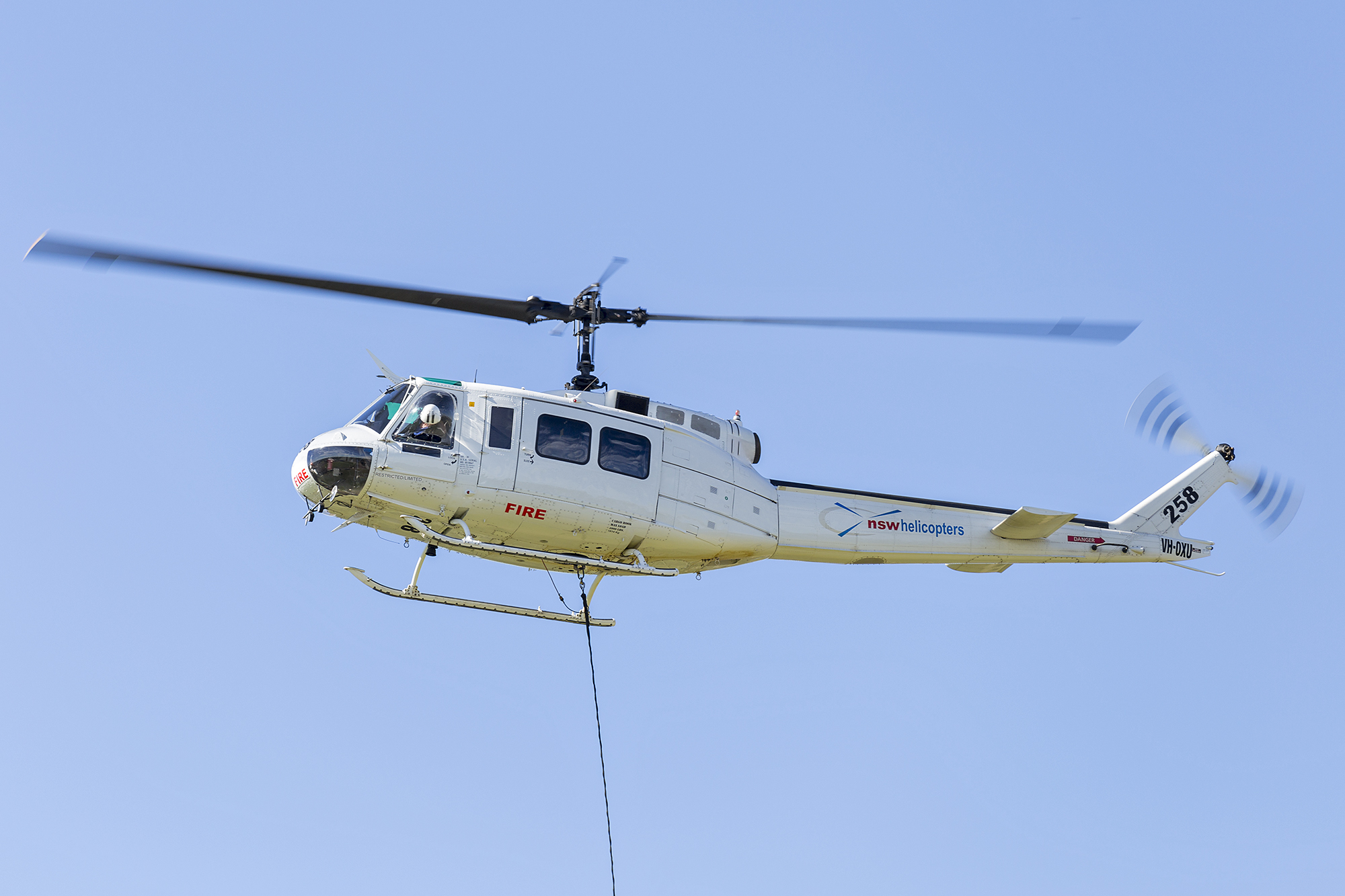
- A Bell UH-1H Iroquois, similar to the aircraft involved.

Accident
- Date: January 17, 2018
- Summary: Controlled flight into terrain
- Site: Raton, New Mexico, United States

Aircraft
- Aircraft type: Bell UH-1H Iroquois
- Operator: Sapphire Aviation
- Registration: N658H
- Flight origin: Raton Municipal Airport
- Destination: Folsom, New Mexico
- Occupants: 6
- Passengers: 5
- Crew: 1
- Fatalities: 5
- Injuries: 1
- Survivors: 1

On January 17, 2018, a Bell UH-1H Iroquois helicopter of Sapphire Aviation crashed near Raton, New Mexico, United States. Five of the six people on board were killed. The sole survivor was in serious condition.

== Accident ==
The helicopter crashed and caught fire east of Raton, New Mexico. The pilot, pilot rated passenger, and three of the four passengers on board were killed, including Zimbabwean politician Roy Bennett and British world record holder Charles Burnett III. Burnett had set the record for a steam-powered car in 2009. The sole survivor, Andra Cobb, was the daughter of the pilot rated passenger Paul Cobb, and the long term romantic partner of Charles Burnett. Cobb was seriously injured but was able to raise the alarm by cellphone; although she was unable to give the location of the crash, it was located by New Mexico State Police on a ranch 15 miles (24 km) east of Raton. The aircraft was flying from Raton Municipal Airport to a site in Folsom, New Mexico. It crashed at about 18:00 local time. The Albuquerque Journal reported that the pilot had said that there had been mechanical problems with the helicopter the day before the accident. It was stated that these had been fixed before the fatal flight.

== Aircraft ==
The aircraft involved was a Bell UH-1H Iroquois, registration N658H, msn 9856.

The aircraft served with the United States Army (as serial number "67-17658") and saw action during the Vietnam War, it crashed on 31 May 1969 at Firebase Eagles Nest. It was returned to the United States and repaired and used by the Ohio Army National Guard before being retired to the Firelands Military Museum in Ohio.

== Investigation ==
The US National Transportation Safety Board investigated the accident. The final report cited pilot error, determining pilot Coleman Dodd was flying too low. Investigators said a low therapeutic amount of an antihistamine was found in his blood but could not say with certainty it contributed to his inability to avoid crashing.
