= Johnson Mesa =

Mesa in Colfax County, New Mexico, U.S.

- Johnson Mesa viewed from above Raton, NM

Highest point
- Elevation: 8,649 ft (2,636 m)
- Coordinates: 36°54′40″N 104°19′33″W

Geography
- Location within New Mexico
- Topo map: Yankee Quadrangle

Geology
- Mountain type: Mesa

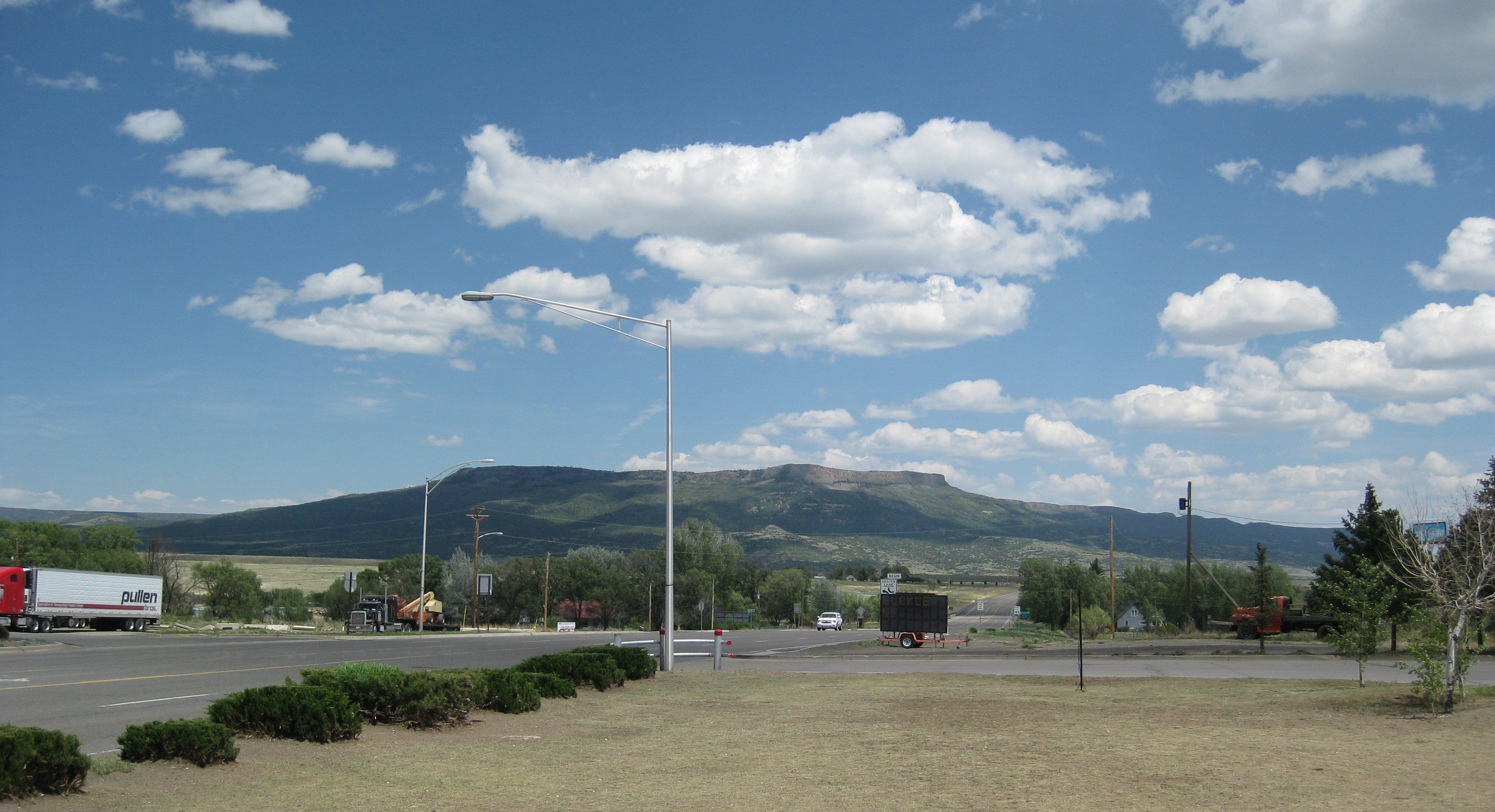
Johnson Mesa as seen from Raton, New Mexico

Johnson Mesa is a prominent mesa in Colfax County in northeastern New Mexico just south of the Colorado border. The city of Raton is on the west and the community of Folsom on the east.

== Description ==
Johnson Mesa is about 14 miles (23 km) long, running east to west, and 2 miles (3.2 km) to 6 miles (9.7 km) wide, north to south. The lava-topped tableland slopes downward from 8,649 ft (2,636 m) to 7,600 ft (2,300 m) from west to east. Steep-sided cliffs from 500 ft (150 m) to 1,900 ft (580 m) high ring the Mesa.

Johnson Mesa is a high plateau with a top-of-the-world atmosphere looking out over the Great Plains far below. New Mexico Highway 72 traverses the mesa east to west, part of the Dry Cimarron State Scenic & Historic Byway. Several volcanic cones, including Red Mountain, Towndrow Peak, and Dale Mountain rise about 400 feet (122 m) above the mostly flat and treeless terrain. The cliffs surrounding the mesa are wooded with pinyon, juniper, Gambel oak and ponderosa pine, but the top is grassland. The source of the Dry Cimarron River is on the Mesa, but, before the coming of settlers, the only water sources were depressions in which water collected after rains. Several shallow lakes and ponds, including Berry and Bellisle lakes, have been created as watering holes for cattle. Below the south rim of Johnson Mesa is Johnson Park, about 3 miles (5 km) by 2 miles (3 km), at an elevation of 6,800 ft (2,100 m). The earliest access to the Mesa was through the Park.

The high altitude moderates summer temperatures, but winters are very cold and windy. The Mesa receives about 18 inches (457 mm) of precipitation annually as does nearby Raton.

== History ==
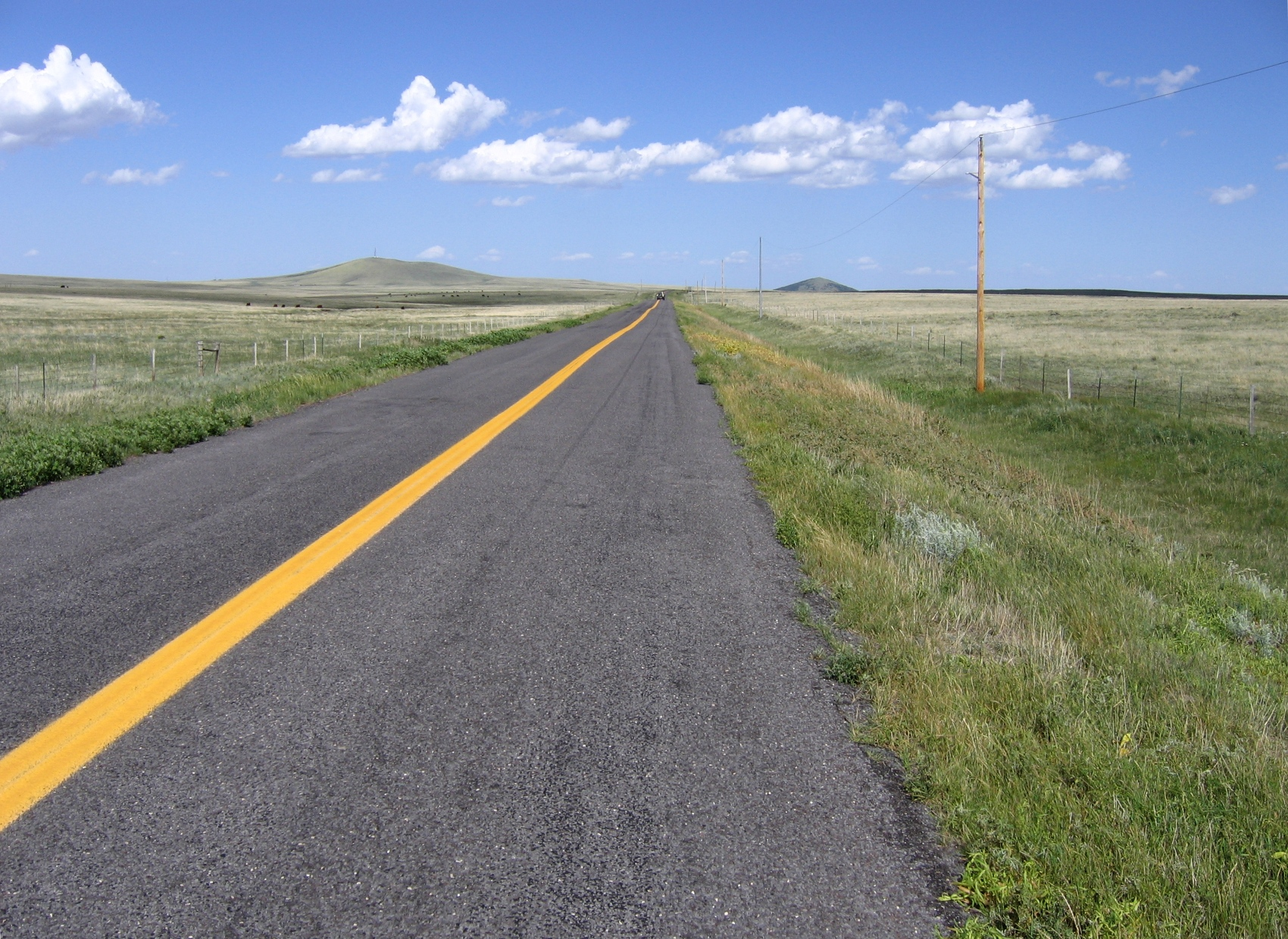
Atop Johnson Mesa, looking east, July 2006. Dale Mountain on left; Red Mountain on right.

There is no archaeological evidence that American Indians inhabited the mesa although just below the eastern rim of the Mesa at the Folsom site one of the earliest traces of early man in the Americas was discovered.

The first white settler was Elijah (Lige) Johnson who established a ranch in Johnson Park about 1882 and pastured cattle on the mesa. Grazing on top of mesas was a traditional practice throughout northern New Mexico, where some mesas to this day are known as potreros. About 1887, Marion Bell, a railway construction worker, led a group of dissatisfied and unemployed railroad workers and coal miners from Blossberg (near Raton) and began homesteading the Mesa. The settlers congregated around the home of Lon Bell and the post office of Bell was established here. Soon the entire mesa was full of homesteads, each with their 160 acres (65 ha) of free land.

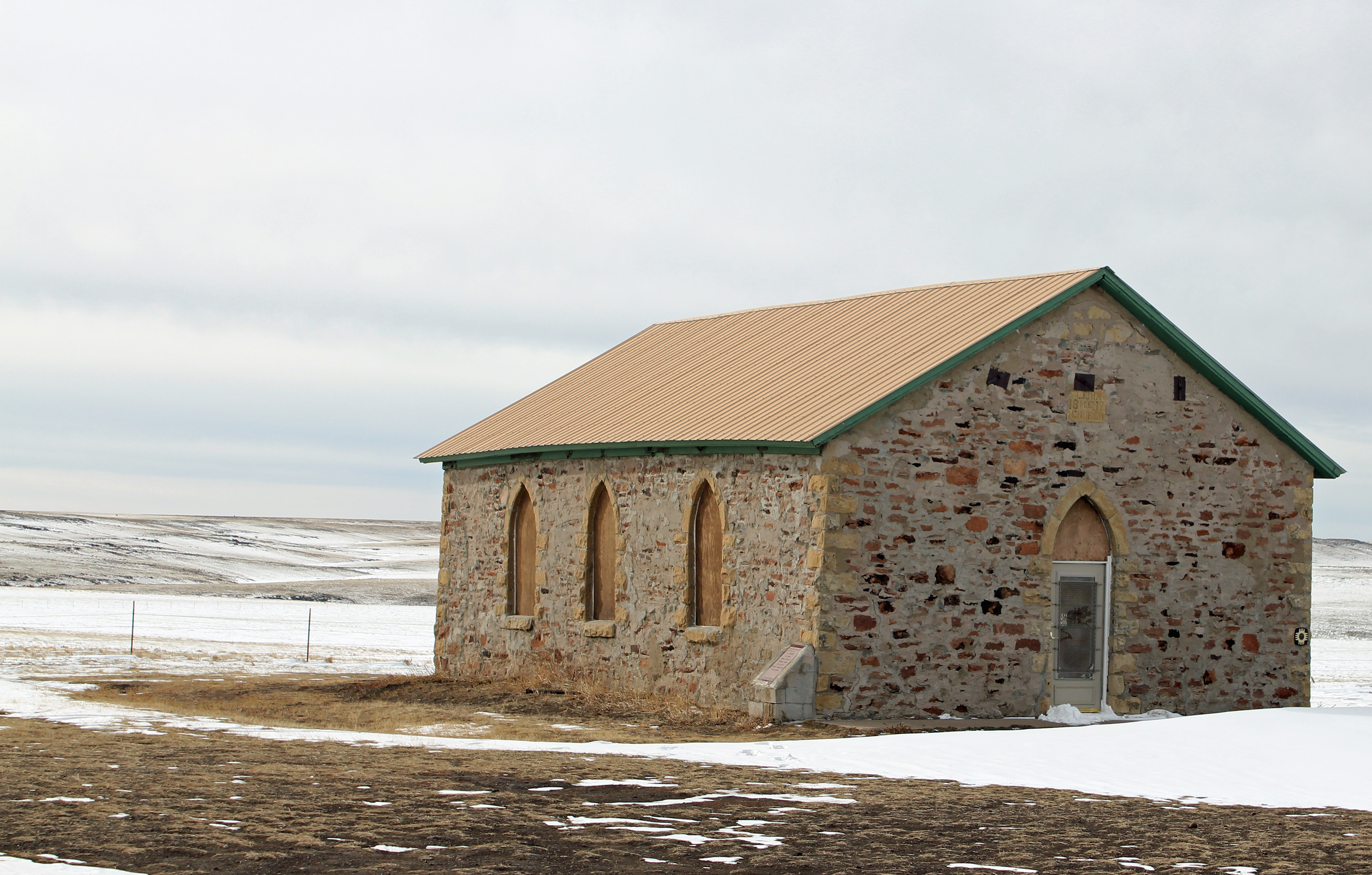
St. John's Methodist Episcopal Church is one of the few remnants of the previous settlement on Johnson Mesa.

The community of Bell and Johnson Mesa peaked in population about 1900 with 487 residents. Bell had a Methodist church and a cemetery, five schools were scattered around the mesa, and the residents of the mesa held annual celebrations on July 4 and August 14, the date the church was dedicated. The principal crops raised in the fertile volcanic soils of the Mesa were oats, potatoes, vegetables, and hay. Many of the men worked at both farming and coal mining. Carrier pigeons were dispatched from the mines to the top of the Mesa when workers were needed.

The long, cold winters defeated many farmers and by 1910 the population had dropped to 335. By 1920 after an influenza epidemic it was only 215 and by 1950 it had fallen to 56. The Post Office at Bell was closed in 1933. In the early 21st century, nobody lived on Johnson Mesa year round although some ranchers passed the summer there tending their cattle. Surviving at Bell is a cemetery and St. John's Methodist Episcopal Church, dating from 1897.
