= Folsom site =

Archaeological type site

- Folsom Site
- U.S. National Register of Historic Places
- U.S. National Historic Landmark
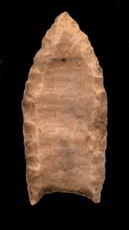
- A Folsom point
- Nearest city: Folsom, New Mexico
- Area: 10 acres (4.0 ha)
- NRHP reference No.: 66000473

Significant dates
- Added to NRHP: October 15, 1966
- Designated NHL: January 20, 1961

The Folsom Site or Wild Horse Arroyo, designated by the Smithsonian trinomial 29CX1, is a major archaeological site about 8 miles (13 km) west of Folsom, New Mexico. It is the type site for the Folsom tradition, a Paleo-Indian cultural sequence dating to between 11000 and 10000 BC. The Folsom Site was excavated in 1926 and found to have been a marsh-side kill site or camp where 32 bison had been killed using distinctive tools, known as Folsom points. This site is significant because it was the first time that artifacts indisputably made by humans were found directly associated with faunal remains from an extinct form of bison from the Late Pleistocene. The information culled from this site was the first of a set of discoveries that would allow archaeologists to revise their estimations for the time of arrival of Native Americans on the North American continent.

== Discovery ==
The site was found in 1908 by George McJunkin, an African-American former-slave, cowboy, and ranch foreman. While riding across the Crowfoot Ranch following a heavy rainstorm on August 27, which had devastated the nearby town of Folsom, he noticed and investigated a number of large bones where flash flooding from that storm had cut deeply into the bed of Wild Horse Arroyo. McJunkin was a self-educated man, with enough expertise in geology and archaeology to recognize that the bones were not modern bison, and had been too deeply buried to be recent. For several years he tried to interest field archaeologists to visit the site, with little success. In 1918, he and Ivan Shoemaker, the teenage son of the Crowfoot Ranch's owner, dug bones and a fluted lance point out of the arroyo bank, and sent them to the Denver Museum of Natural History. The museum sent paleontologist Harold Cook to the Crowfoot site the following spring, and he and McJunkin did some exploratory digging.

== Excavation ==
In 1926, archaeologist Jesse Figgins from the Denver Museum (now the Denver Museum of Nature and Science) and Harold Cook arrived at the site to begin excavations. Figgins discovered a light, fluted projectile point buried between two of the bison's ribs, thus establishing a clear association of the point with the species of bison that had been extinct for approximately 10,000 years. Instead of extracting the projectile point from the bones, he instead cut around the bones and the embedded projectile point, removing the entire sample without disturbing the associated point.

Figgins returned to the Denver Museum of Natural History with the point and bones for further study. The original Folsom point, still embedded in the matrix between the two bison ribs, can be seen on display at the very end of the Prehistoric Journey exhibit at the Denver Museum of Nature and Science.

== Controversy ==
During the first quarter of the 20th century, a bitter debate raged in the archaeology and physical anthropology communities about recent discoveries suggesting that humans had arrived in the Americas several thousand years earlier than had previously been thought possible. Most notably Ales Hrdlicka, curator of the U.S. National Museum, remained adamant in his belief that humans could not have arrived until about 1000 years BCE. Findings of stone tools together with ancient animal remains were dismissed as, at best, mixing due to erosion or burrowing animals, or worse as careless excavation techniques, or even fraudulent "salting" of artifacts among the bones. Any archaeologist bold enough to challenge the conventional view without indisputable proof risked damage to his reputation and career. The site in Wild Horse Arroyo challenged orthodoxy.

== Present Day ==
The site was declared a National Historic Landmark in 1961.

== See also ==
- Lindenmeier site, another National Historic Landmark site that was a Folsom culture campsite, in northern Colorado.
- Cooper Bison Kill Site, another Folsom culture kill site in Oklahoma
- Jones-Miller Bison Kill Site a Folsom culture kill site in northeastern Colorado
- National Register of Historic Places listings in Colfax County, New Mexico
- List of National Historic Landmarks in New Mexico
