= Wilton M. Krogman =

American anthropologist

- Born: Wilton Marion Krogman; 28 June 1903; Oak Park, Illinois, U.S.
- Died: 4 November 1987 (aged 83); Lititz, Pennsylvania, U.S.
- Education: University of Chicago
- Awards: Viking Fund Medal (1950)
- Scientific career
- Fields: Anthropology

Wilton Marion Krogman (June 28, 1903 – November 4, 1987) was an American anthropologist. He was a leader in the development of the field of physical anthropology, with an early and lasting interest in dental anthropology.

Over his long career he also contributed to osteology, racial studies, genetics, medical anthropology, paleoanthropology, constitutional anthropology, and human engineering. His main interests and his most important contributions were in the areas of child growth and development and forensic anthropology.

== Biography ==
Wilton Krogman, familiarly known as Bill, was the son of Wilhelm Claus Krogman and Lydia Magdalena Wriedt, who were German immigrants living in Oak Park, Illinois. His parents lacked advanced education, but strongly encouraged him to pursue his studies. His father was a skilled craftsman, described as a perfectionist, who worked with his brothers on the first house by Frank Lloyd Wright.

Krogman came in first on a standardized test among 490 applicants to the University of Chicago, which he attended as an undergraduate and post-graduate, gaining his Ph.D. in 1928. There he had his first job, as a lecturer in introductory anthropology. The next year he had a fellowship to the Royal College of Surgeons in London. Starting in 1931 he was an associate professor at Western Reserve University in Cleveland, where he interacted with many of the leaders of the profession.

In 1939 Krogman wrote an article in the F.B.I. newsletter entitled "A Guide to the Identification of Human Skeletal Material". It is widely considered to mark the beginning of forensic anthropology in the United States. Over the years Professor Krogman came to be popularly known as "the bone doctor", examining such famous cases as two boy's skeletons found in the Tower of London.

In 1939 he returned to the faculty of the University of Chicago, as associate professor of both anatomy and physical anthropology, teaching graduate students for the first time.

Then in 1947 Krogman was called to be professor of physical anthropology in both the Graduate School of Medicine and the School of Dental Medicine at the University of Pennsylvania. A package deal gave him an ex officio appointment in the university's Department of Anthropology and as a curator in the university museum. He was also put on the staff of the Children's Hospital of Philadelphia. The multifaceted positions helped him realize his wide-ranging research goals.

After becoming professor emeritus at the University of Pennsylvania in 1971, he moved to Lancaster, Pennsylvania, to become director of research at the H. K. Cooper Clinic, which worked on cleft palates, finally stepping down from active service there in 1983.

Krogman was the author of a number of books. One he liked was The Growth of Man (1941), and one of his most widely known was Child Growth (1972). But without doubt his most famous and influential book was The Human Skeleton in Forensic Medicine (1962) (updated in 1986), long the definitive work on the topic. He also wrote numerous articles in peer-reviewed scientific journals.

He was elected to the National Academy of Sciences in 1966.

He was first married to Virginia Madge Lane. They had a daughter, Marian Krogman Baur, and a son, William L. Krogman. In 1945, he married Mary Helen Winkley and they had two sons, John Winkley Krogman and Mark Austin Krogman.

Krogman received honorary degrees from Baylor University, the University of Michigan, and the University of Pennsylvania.

His definitive biography is by William A. Haviland, a longtime colleague and friend. It was published by the National Academy of Sciences in 1994.
