= Aleš Hrdlička =

Czech-American anthropologist (1869–1943)

- Hrdlička in 1922
- Born: 30 March 1869; Humpolec, Bohemia, Austria-Hungary (in modern Czech Republic)
- Died: 5 September 1943 (aged 74); Washington, D.C., United States
- Education: Eclectic Medical College New York
- Occupation: Anthropologist
- Parent(s): Maxmilian Hrdlička, Karolina Hrdličková

Signature
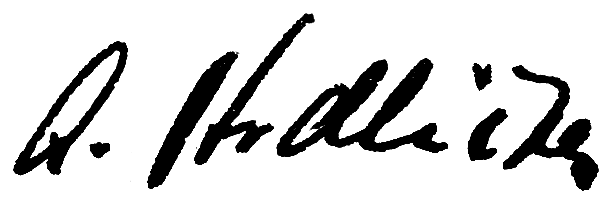

Alois Ferdinand Hrdlička, after 1918 changed to Aleš Hrdlička (Czech pronunciation: [ˈa.lɛʃ ˈɦr̩d.lɪtʃ.ka]; 30 March 1869 – 5 September 1943), was an Austro-Hungarian-born anthropologist who lived in the United States after his family had moved there in 1881. He was born in Humpolec, Bohemia (today in the Czech Republic).

Hrdlička was a pioneer in the field of anthropology and the first curator of physical anthropology of the Smithsonian Museum from 1904 until 1941. He believed in the theory that migration from Asia to the Americas via the Bering Strait was the origin of the American Indians, a migration he said had occurred not more than 3,000 years ago. He initially denied evidence by archaeological findings such as that of Folsom man in 1927 which pushed the date of human presence in the Americas back to more than 10,000 years ago.

== Life and career ==
Hrdlička was born at Humpolec house 393 on 30 March 1869 to an ethnic Czech family in what was then the Austro-Hungarian Empire. He was baptized Catholic the next day after his birth at the Kostel svatého Mikuláše. His mother, Karolína Hrdličková, educated her child herself; his skills and knowledge made it possible to skip the primary level of school. When he was 13, Hrdlička arrived in New York with his father Maxmilian Hrdlička on 10 September 1881 via the SS Elbe from Bremen. His mother and three younger siblings emigrated to the U.S. separately. After arrival, the promised job brought only a disappointment to his father who started working in a cigar factory along with teenaged Alois to earn a living for the family with six other children. Young Hrdlička attended evening courses to improve his English, and at the age of 18, he decided to study medicine since he had suffered from tuberculosis and experienced the treatment difficulties of those times. In 1889, Hrdlička began studies at Eclectic Medical College and then continued at Homeopathic College in New York. To finish his medical studies, Hrdlička sat for exams in Baltimore in 1894. At first, he worked in the Middletown asylum for mentally affected where he learnt of anthropometry. In 1896, Hrdlička left for Paris, where he started to work as an anthropologist with other experts of the then establishing field of science.

Between 1898 and 1903, during his scientific travel across America, Hrdlička became the first scientist to spot and document the theory of human colonization of the American continent from east Asia, which he claimed was only some 3,000 years ago. He argued that the Indians migrated across the Bering Strait from Asia, supporting this theory with detailed field research of skeletal remains as well as studies of the people in Mongolia, Tibet, Siberia, Alaska, and Aleutian Islands. The findings backed up the argument which later contributed to the theory of global origin of human species that was awarded by the Thomas Henry Huxley Award in 1927.

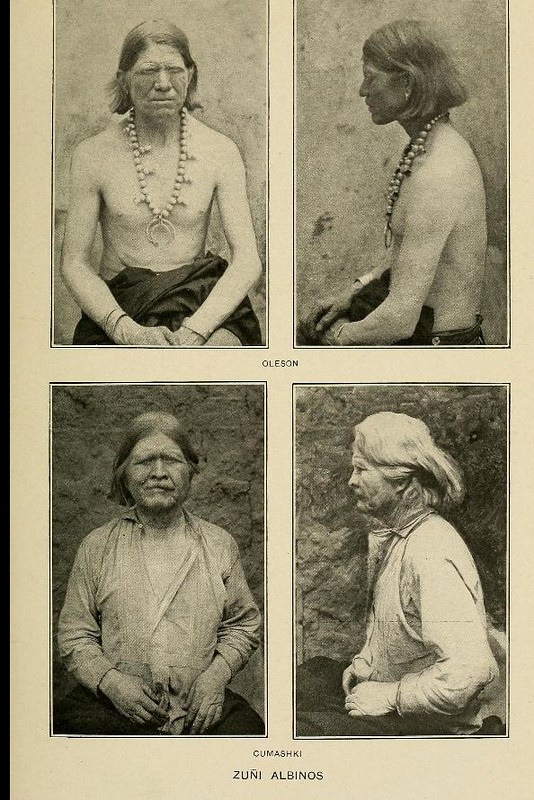
A page from Hrdlička's book Physiological and medical observations among the Indians of southwestern United States and northern Mexico, with four photographs of Zuni Native Americans

Aleš Hrdlička founded and became the first curator of physical anthropology of the U.S. National Museum, now the Smithsonian Institution National Museum of Natural History in 1904 and held that position until 1941. He was elected to the American Academy of Arts and Sciences in 1915 and the American Philosophical Society in 1918. That same year, he founded the American Journal of Physical Anthropology. After he stepped down, the journal volume number, which had reached Volume 29 in 1942, was restarted at Volume 1 in 1943.

In January 1913, Hrdlička embarked on an expedition to Lima, Peru, during which he removed 80 trephined and "otherwise highly interesting" skulls from a grave site in the Andes mountain range. Despite the remains taken from the area, Hrdlička overall disliked the expedition and was disappointed in what he accomplished. The expedition was plagued with constant rain, inconsistent food supply, and treacherous terrain, and Hrdlička directly mentioned his disdain for the local population, claiming that archaeological sites were regularly vandalized, merchants would overcharge him for supplies, and 'ignorant, superstitious, and often drunk people' would provide him with unreliable information. Moreso than any of those factors, Hrdlička was frustrated with his inability to find any 'full-blooded' native people to serve as subjects for his research.

Hrdlička was involved in examining a skull to determine that it belonged to Adolph Ruth, who was sensationalized in the press after going missing in Arizona in 1931 searching for the legendary Lost Dutchman's Gold Mine.

He always sponsored his fellow expatriates and also donated to the institution of anthropology in Prague, which was founded in 1930 by his co-explorer Jindřich Matiegka, in his native country (the institution later took his name). Between 1936 and 1938, Hrdlička led the excavation of over 50 mummies from caves on Kagamil Island. A small number of the mummies were actually studied, and Hrdlička never recorded any information on the soft tissue of the subjects. This has led to the belief that he may have disposed of the soft tissue without any research due to his focus on skeletal anthropometry.

Hrdlička's views on race are inspired by those of Georges Cuvier, who in the 19th century argued that there are "only 3 distinct racial stems: The White, The Black, and The Yellow-Brown." Hrdlička used the "Yellow-Brown" classification as a grouping for non-European and African regions.

== European hypothesis ==
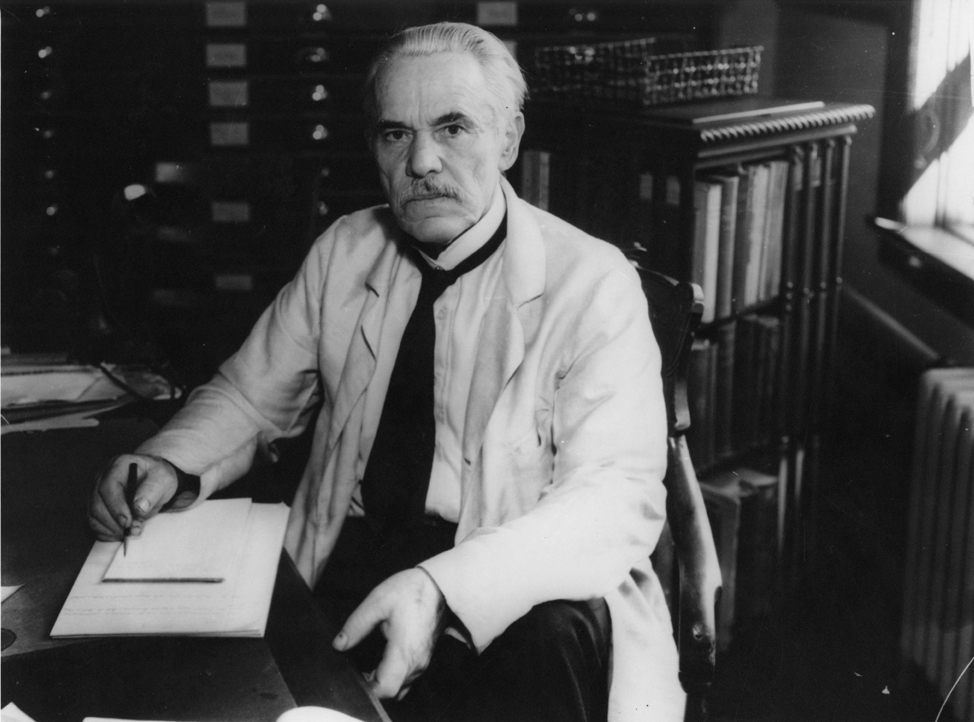
Aleš Hrdlička (1930).

Hrdlička was interested in the origin of human beings. He was a critic of hominid evolution as well as the Asia hypothesis, as he claimed there was little evidence to go on for those theories. He dismissed finds such as the Ramapithecus which were labeled as hominids by most scientists, instead believing that they were nothing more than fossil apes, unrelated to human ancestry.

In a lecture on "The Origin of Man", delivered for the American Association for the Advancement of Science, at Cincinnati, Ohio, Hrdlička said that the cradle of man is not in Central Asia but in Central Europe, as Europe is the earliest known location where human skeletal remains have been found.

Hrdlička was almost alone in his views. The European hypothesis fell into decline and is now considered an obsolete scientific theory which has been replaced by the Out of Africa hypothesis.

== Controversy and criticism ==
In the early 1900s, Hrdlička became the chief advocate of the scholarly opinion that man had not lived in the Americas for longer than 3,000 years. Hrdlička and others made it "virtually taboo" for any anthropologist "desirous of a successful career" to advocate a deep antiquity for inhabitants of the Americas. The findings at the Folsom site in New Mexico eventually overturned that archaeological orthodoxy.

More recently, Hrdlička's methods have come under scrutiny and criticism with regard to his treatment of Native American remains. An AP newswire article, "Mexico Indian Remains Returned From NY Museum For Burial" from November 17, 2009, recounted his study of Mexico's tribal races, including the beheading of still-decomposing victims of a massacre of Yaqui Indians and removing the flesh from the skulls as part of these studies. He also threw out the corpse of an infant that was found in a cradleboard but forwarded this artifact along with the skulls and other remains to New York's American Museum of Natural History. While these practices are not inconsistent with other ethnographers and human origin researchers of that era, the moral and ethical ramifications of these research practices continues to be debated today. His work has also been linked to the development of American eugenics laws. In 1926, he was an advisory member of the American Eugenics Society.

== Family ==
On 6 August 1896, Hrdlička married German-American Marie Stickler (whom he had courted since 1892), daughter of Phillip Jakob Strickler from Edenkoben, Bavaria, who immigrated to Manhattan in 1855. Marie died in 1918 of complications of diabetes. In the summer of 1920 Hrdlička married a second time; his fiancée was another German-American woman, Wilhelmina "Mina" Mansfield. Both marriages were childless.
