= St. John's Methodist Episcopal Church (Raton, New Mexico) =

Historic church in New Mexico, United States

- U.S. National Register of Historic Places
- NM State Register of Cultural Properties
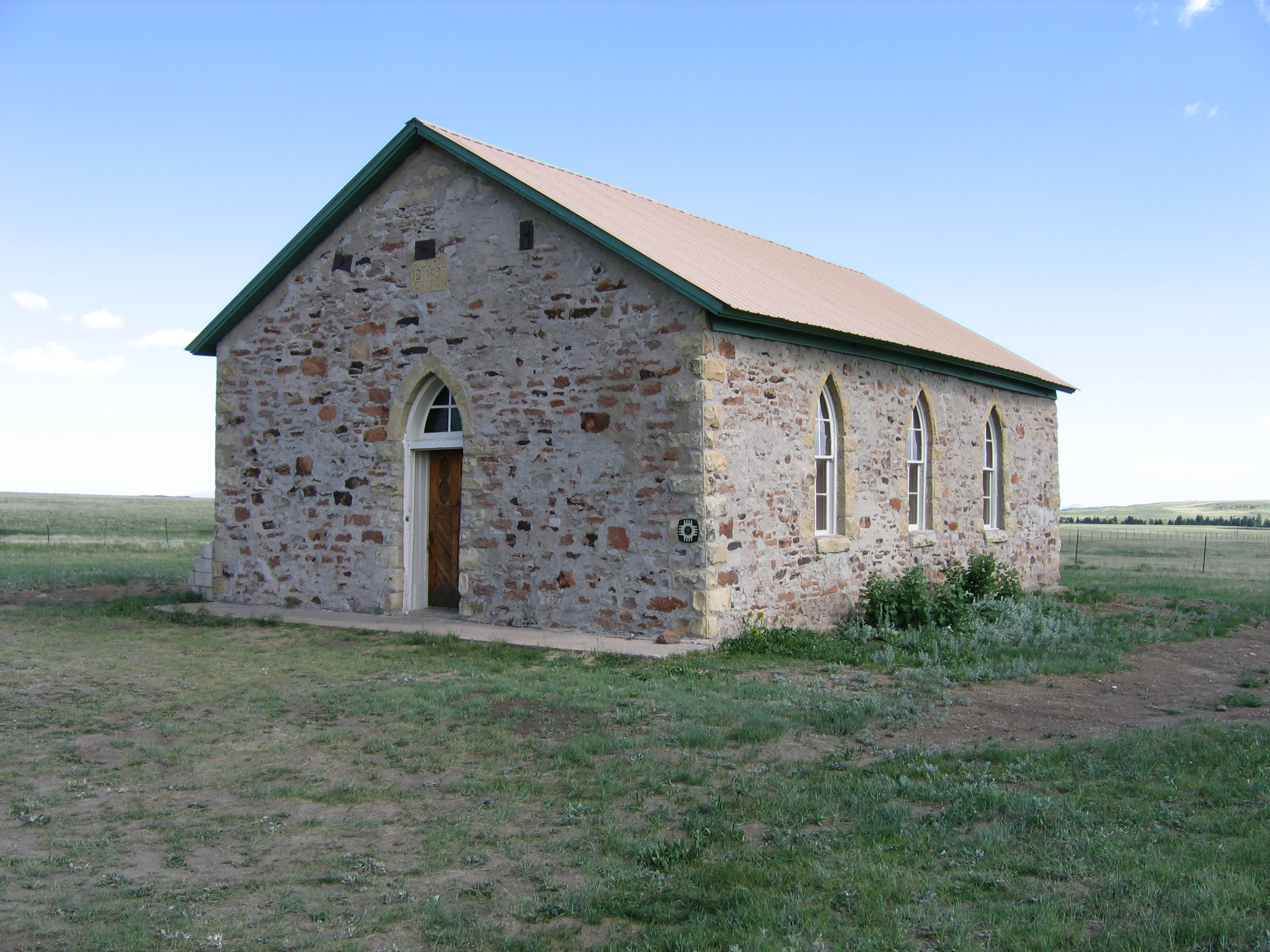
- St. John's Church in 2006

- Location within New Mexico
- Nearest city: Raton, New Mexico
- Coordinates: 36°54′52″N 104°12′18″W
- Area: 2 acres (0.81 ha)
- Built: 1897
- NRHP reference No.: 78001814
- NMSRCP No.: 373

Significant dates
- Added to NRHP: January 18, 1978
- Designated NMSRCP: February 28, 1975

The St. John's Methodist Episcopal Church in Raton, New Mexico is a historic church. It was built in 1897 and added to the National Register of Historic Places in 1978. The listing included three contributing buildings.

It is a 24 by 36 feet (7.3 m × 11.0 m) stone building. It was built of native red sandstone, originally with a mortar similar to adobe which deteriorated. In more recently it was repointed with cement and a cement foundation was put into place.

It is located on Johnson Mesa about 17 miles (27 km) east of Raton on New Mexico State Road 72.

== See also ==
- National Register of Historic Places listings in Colfax County, New Mexico
