= Viking Fund Medal =

Annual award in Anthropology

The Viking Fund Medal is an annual award given out by the Wenner-Gren Foundation for Anthropological Research for distinguishing research or publication in the field of Anthropology. From 1946 to 1961, nominees were selected by their respective societies: The American Anthropological Association, the Society for American Archaeology, and the American Association of Physical Anthropologists, respectively for the fields of General Anthropology, Archaeology, and Physical Anthropology. In 1961, the selection procedure was modified for international nominees selection to increase the number of qualified applicants; the Viking Fund Medal has no longer been awarded annually, due to the embezzlement SEK 40,000,000 from the foundation by the trustee, Birger Strid, who was convicted of financial irregularities in 1975, with many years between awards.

Beginnings

The Viking fund medal was created in 1946. The award was created by the Wenner-Gren Foundation for Anthropological Research as a means of recognizing major breakthroughs or research in the field of anthropology. The first award in archaeology would be awarded to Alfred Vincent Kidder for his work at Pecos Historical National Park in New Mexico [5]. The first award in general anthropology would be given to Alfred Kroeber in the same year. Kroeber was awarded for his vast contributions to the field of anthropology; such as being a founding member and later president of the American Anthropological Association and becoming president of the Linguistic Society of America [6].

Notable winners

In 1951, Wilton Marion Krogman would be the fifth person to win the Viking Fund Medal. He won his award specifically in the field of physical archaeology.[7]

In 1957, Dr. Raymond Arthur Dart would win the award for physical anthropology. Dart's most well known contribution in the field of anthropology was the discovery of the primitive hominid known as Australopithecus Africanus.[8]

In 1959, Irving Rouse won the Viking fund medal for archaeology. Rouse was both a professor and the head of the department of archaeology at Yale University, and was recognized for his diligence in administration, roles in the Society for American Archaeology, and his years of service in the fields of both archaeology and anthropology.[9]

Cancelation

Between 1964 and 1972; Birger Strid, the general manager of the Wenner-Gren Foundation, would be convicted for fraud and breach of trust in the manipulation of funds. This would cause the award to not be given out for several years.[10] After the scandal, the Viking fund award would be reinstated in 2003, and would be awarded to Professor Dame Marilyn Strathern. Strathern was the mistress of Girton Collage at Cambridge University, and was given the award for her contributions to anthropology such as her analysis on gender based on her New Guinea ethnography.[11]

Year	General Anthropology	Archaeology	Physical Anthropology
1946	Alfred Kroeber	Alfred Kidder	Franz Weidenreich
1947	Robert Lowie	John Brew	Earnest Hooton
1948	John Swanton	Alex Krieger	Adolph Schultz
1949	George Murdock	Hallam Movius	William Gregory
1950	Clyde Kluckhohn	Emil Haury	Wilton Krogman
1951	Ralph Linton	Frank H. H. Roberts	Carleton Coon
1952	Julian Steward	Alfonso Caso	William Straus
1953	Melville Herskovits	Gordon Willey	T. Dale Stewart
1954	Robert Redfield	Wm. Duncan Strong	William Howells
1955	A.I. Hallowell	J. Eric Thompson	W.E. LeGros Clark
1956	Fred Eggan	Junius Bird	Mildred Trotter
1957	Margaret Mead	James Griffin	Raymond Dart
1958	Raymond Firth	Jesse D. Jennings	Henri Vallois
1959	Leslie White	Irving Rouse	William Greulich
1960	Leslie Spier	S.K. Lothrop	Sherwood Washburn

Year	Recipients			
1961	E. E. Evans-Pritchard	Robert Heine-Geldern	Louis S.B. Leakey	Sol Tax
1966	Claude Lévi-Strauss			
1972	Grahame Clark			
award suspended 1972-2003 (funds embezzled from foundation)
2003	Marilyn Strathern			
2004	Jane H. Hill			
2005	George Armelagos			

== See also ==
- List of anthropology awards
- List of archaeology awards
