= Frank H. H. Roberts =

American archaeologist (1897–1966)

- Born: August 11, 1897; Centerburg, Ohio, US
- Died: February 23, 1966 (aged 68); Washington, D.C., US
- Education: University of Denver (BA 1919)(MA 1921), Harvard University (Masters and PhD 1926)
- Occupations: Archaeologist, anthropologist

Frank Harold Hanna Roberts (August 11, 1897 – February 23, 1966) was an American archaeologist and anthropologist, who was the final director of the Bureau of American Ethnology of the Smithsonian Institution. He worked largely in the American West, including field research at the Lindenmeier site in Northern Colorado and Pueblo Bonito in New Mexico. A 1951 recipient of the Viking Fund Medal, he served as associate editor of the American Anthropologist from 1932 to 1944 and as assistant editor of American Antiquity from 1935 to 1950. He was a member of several scientific societies, including the American Geographical Society, Anthropological Society of Washington (president, 1936), Washington Academy of Sciences (president, 1949), American Anthropological Association (vice president, 1944), Society for American Archaeology (president, 1950), and the American Association for the Advancement of Science (vice president, 1952).

== Early life and education ==
Roberts was born in Centerburg, Ohio, August 11, 1897 to Frank Hunt Hurd Roberts, a professor, and Lou Ella Roberts (née Hanna). Roberts grew up in Laramie, Wyoming, where his father taught civics and history, and Denver, Colorado, before moving to Las Vegas, New Mexico, in 1910, where his father was president of New Mexico Normal University. He studied at the University of Denver, earning a bachelor's degree in history and English (1919) and master's degree (1921) in political science. He was a reporter for the New Mexico The Las Vegas Optic until 1920. He was an assistant curator at the Colorado State Museum in 1923 and 1924 before moving to Harvard University, where he earned a second master's (1926) and PhD (1926) in Philosophy.

His younger brother, Henry B. Roberts, was also an archaeologist.

== Career ==
=== 1921-1933 ===
During these years, Roberts was focused on basket makers and pueblo sites in the Southwest region of the USA. His "first fieldwork experience was in the Piedra-Pagosa region of the Upper San Juan River Basin in southwestern Colorado" and instructor at the University of Denver while also working as the assistant curator at the State Historical and Natural History Society of Colorado. He transferred to Harvard for his PhD, writing his dissertation based on his participation in a National Geographic Society expedition in 1926 to Pueblo Bonito under the direction of archaeologist Neil Judd. In 1926 Roberts joined the Bureau of American Ethnology (BAE) at the Smithsonian Institution where he served until 1944.

=== 1934-1944 ===
Roberts' focus during this decade was on Paleo-Indian sites when in 1934 he visited the Lindenmeier site in Northern Colorado, "where Folsom points had been found" ... Roberts became the foremost Paleoindian scholar during this period.". He coined the term "Paleo-Indian" in a 1940 article entitled "Developments in the Problem of the North American Paleo-Indian."

=== 1945-1966 ===
These were his administrative years, working with the U.S. government to organize the River Basin Surveys program, "one of the largest and most successful single archaeological efforts ever undertaken" by the US. He remained involved in this project as it was his "chief interest for the remainder of his life."

== Works ==
- Doctoral dissertation: The Ceramic Sequence in the Chaco Canyon, New Mexico, and its Relation to the Cultures of the San Juan Basin
- Smithsonian Institution holds 3,100 photographs of the Frank H. H. Roberts Jr. collection mostly from the Pueblo period sites that he excavated in Colorado, Arizona and New Mexico.
- "Developments in the Problem of the North American Paleo-Indian" in "Essays in Historical Anthropology of North America" Smithsonian Miscellaneous Collections, Vol. 100, (1940), pp. 51-116.
- "A Crisis in U.S. Archaeology" in Scientific American Magazine Vol. 179 No. 6 (December 1948), p. 12
- “The Early Americans” in Scientific American Magazine Vol. 184 No. 2 (February 1951), p. 15

== Professional organizations and associations ==
- Society for American Archaeology (Helped to establish in 1934 and became president in 1950)
- Associate editor of American Anthropologist (1932-1944)
- President of the Anthropological Society of Washington (1936-1937)
- Vice-President of the American Anthropological Association (1944)
- Vice Chairman of the Division of Anthropology and Psychology of the National Research Council (1946)
- Vice-President of the American Association for the Advancement of Science (1952)
- Represented the United States on the International Commission for Historic Sites and Monuments (1939-1943)

== Awards ==
- Viking Fund Medal (1951)
- Honorary Doctor of Laws from University of New Mexico (1957), Colorado University (1959) and University of Denver (1962)

== Personal life ==
Roberts married Linda Butchart in 1927 in Denver, Colorado. He served in the Army from August to December 1918.

He died of a heart attack at Sibley Memorial Hospital in Washington D.C. and his ashes were interred at Arlington National Cemetery. Robert L. Stephenson, writing for American Antiquity, says of Roberts "If American archaeology has ever had such elite, such aristocracy, Frank Roberts was surely foremost among them. Universally respected and admired by all who knew him, he was one of the most influential and most honored of American archaeologists".
