= George McJunkin =

American cowboy and archaeologist (c. 1856–1922)

George McJunkin (c. 1856–1922) was an African-American cowboy, amateur archaeologist and historian. McJunkin discovered the Folsom site in New Mexico in 1908.

== Biography ==
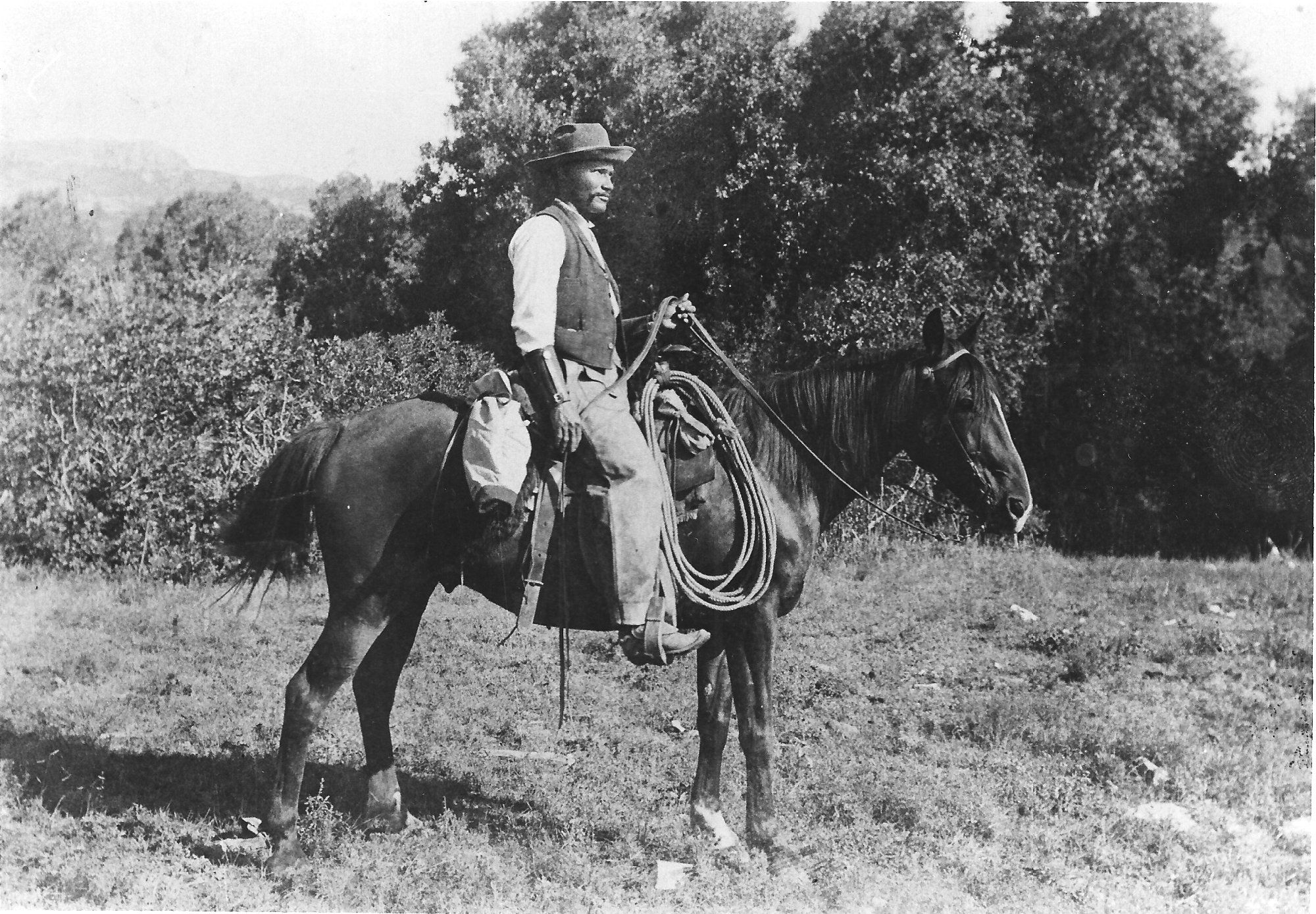
George McJunkin, about 1907

Born to slaves in Midway, Texas, McJunkin was approximately nine years old when the Civil War ended. He worked as a cowboy for freighters. He reportedly learned how to read from fellow cow punchers. McJunkin taught himself to read, write, speak Spanish, play the fiddle and guitar, eventually becoming an amateur archaeologist and historian. In 1868, McJunkin arrived in New Mexico where he would later become a foreman on the Thomas Owens Pitchfork Ranch. McJunkin became a buffalo hunter and worked for several ranches in Colorado, New Mexico and Texas. He was also reported to be an expert bronc rider and one of the best ropers in the United States. He became foreman of the Crowfoot ranch near Folsom, New Mexico. In 2019, he was inducted into the Hall of Great Westerners of the National Cowboy & Western Heritage Museum.

=== Discovery of Folsom site ===
After the flood of August 27, 1908 which killed 18 people in Folsom, McJunkin assessed damage at the Crowfoot Ranch. While patching fence, McJunkin entered an arroyo where he discovered remains of several giant prehistoric bison, exposed where the flood had deeply eroded the arroyo bed. Among the bones of the bison was a distinctive type of stone tool, now called a Folsom point. Recognizing the significance of the find, McJunkin left the site undisturbed, except for recovering a few sample points. For several years he tried to interest archaeologists, with little success. In 1918 he sent sample bones and a lance point to the Denver Museum of Natural History, who sent paleontologist Harold Cook during the following spring, and he and McJunkin did some exploratory digging. But a thorough excavation did not occur until 1926, after McJunkin's death.

Giant bison of the type McJunkin found had gone extinct at the end of the last Ice Age; proof of a human kill established the antiquity of North America's native cultures. McJunkin's discovery of the Folsom site changed New World archaeology, as it showed that people had inhabited North America since at least 9000 BCE, some 7000 years earlier than previously thought.

=== Death ===
At his death, McJunkin was buried at the Folsom Cemetery in Folsom, New Mexico.
