= Cooper Bison Kill Site =

- U.S. National Register of Historic Places
- Nearest city: Fort Supply, Oklahoma
- NRHP reference No.: 02000171
- Added to NRHP: October 7, 2002

The Cooper Bison Kill Site is an archaeological site near Fort Supply in Harper County, Oklahoma, United States. Located along the Beaver River, it was explored in 1993 and 1994 and found to contain artifacts of the Folsom tradition, dated at c.10800 BCE to c. 10,200 BCE in calibrated radiocarbon years. Findings include projectile points (for spears), the bow and arrow not yet being in use at this date. The projectile points are the results of hunters killing bison in an arroyo. Known artifacts at the site from this culture are believed to be the results of three different hunts.

Archaeology in America described the Cooper Site as "...a gully feeding the North Canadian River," which contained evidence of three separate kills, with between twenty and thirty animals in each kill. (Note: The article reported speculation that the remains represented less than half the total number of animals in each kill, since erosion of the gully over time could have carried away the remains of at least the number found in the excavation.) All three kills occurred during late summer or early fall, and each kill contained the remains of cows, calves and young bulls. Tools found at the site consisted only of projectile points and large flake knives.

In 2002, the site was listed on the National Register of Historic Places.

A unique find at the site was that of a Bison antiquus skull, painted with a red zigzag. The Cooper Bison Skull is oldest known painted object in North America. (Note: The paint was made of hematite.) The skull is currently in the collection of the Sam Noble Oklahoma Museum of Natural History at the Norman campus of the University of Oklahoma.

== Additional information ==
- Bement, Leland C. Bison hunting at Cooper site: where lightning bolts drew thundering herds. Norman: University of Oklahoma Press, 1999: 37, 43, 176. ISBN 978-0-8061-3053-8.
- Bement, Leland C. "Folsom Bison Hunting on the Southern Plains." Arrowheads.com Accessed November 14, 2016.
