= Folsom, New Mexico =

Village in Union County, New Mexico, United States

- Village
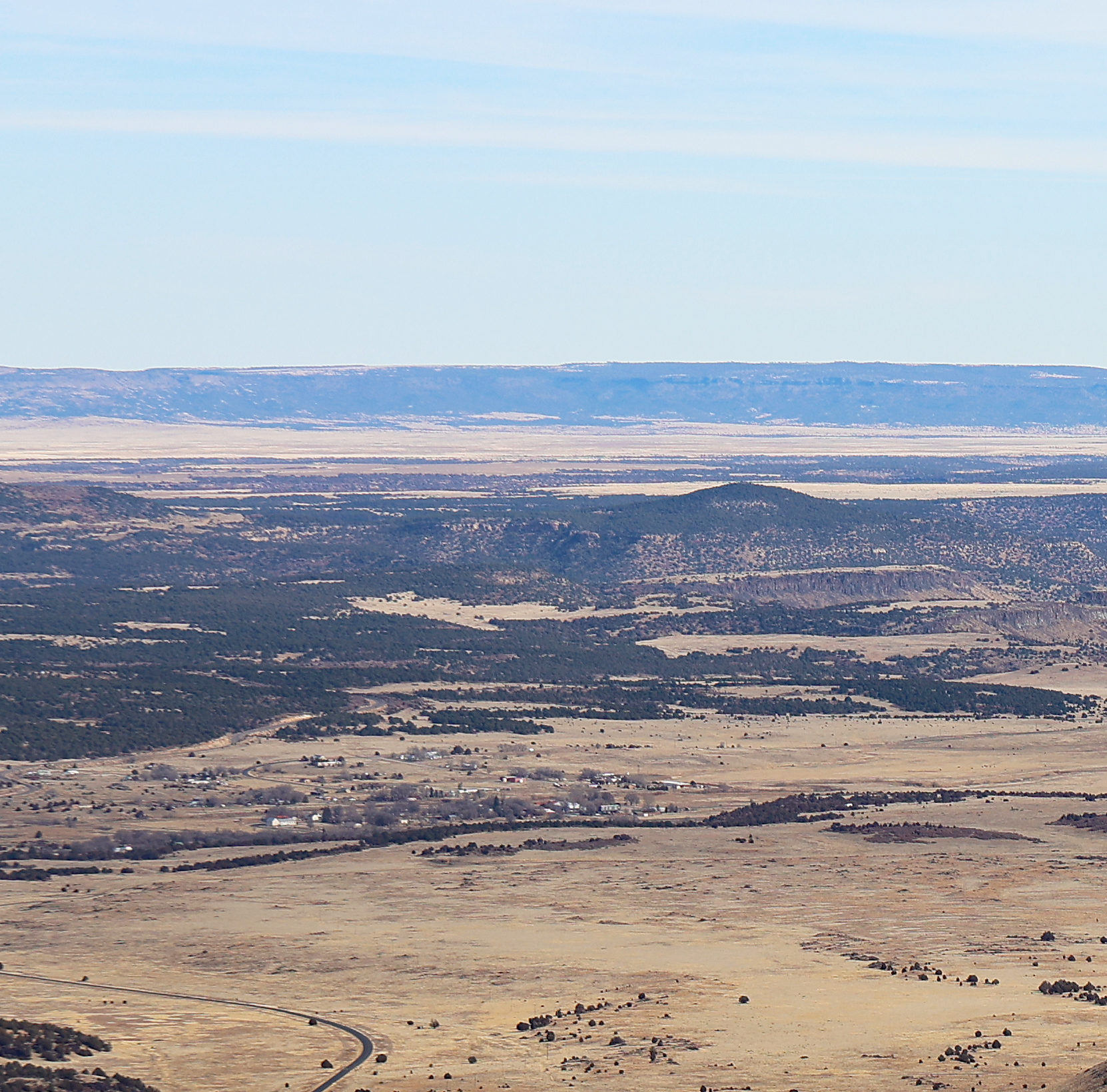
- Folsom viewed from Capulin Volcano

- Location of Folsom, New Mexico

- Location in New Mexico
- Coordinates: 36°50′52″N 103°55′03″W
- Country: United States
- State: New Mexico
- County: Union

Area
  - Total: 0.65 sq mi (1.69 km^{2})
  - Land: 0.65 sq mi (1.69 km^{2})
  - Water: 0 sq mi (0.00 km^{2})
- Elevation: 6,401 ft (1,951 m)

Population (2020)
  - Total: 51
  - Density: 78.3/sq mi (30.23/km^{2})
- Time zone: UTC-7 (Mountain (MST))
  - Summer (DST): UTC-6 (MDT)
- ZIP code: 88419
- Area code: 575
- FIPS code: 35-26780
- GNIS feature ID: 2413552

Folsom is a village in Union County, New Mexico, United States. As of the 2020 census, Folsom had a population of 51. The town was named from Frances Folsom, the fiancée of President Grover Cleveland.

== History ==
Folsom gives its name to the nearby type site for the Folsom Tradition, a Paleo-Indian cultural sequence dating to between 11000 and 8000 BC. The Folsom site, about 8 miles west of the village, was excavated in 1926, and found to have been a marsh-side kill site or camp where 23 bison had been killed using distinctive tools, known as Folsom points.

In the first half of the 19th century, the region was a hunting ground for Comanche, Ute, and Jicarilla Apache Indians. The first white settlement near Folsom was Madison, settled in 1864 and named for its founder, Madison Emery. In 1877, a post office was established. Madison became a ghost town in 1888 when the Colorado and Southern Railroad was completed and Folsom was established nearby on the railroad line. The train was held up three times near Folsom by Black Jack Ketchum and his gang. The final robbery in 1899 led to the capture and hanging of Ketchum.

Folsom prospered in the early years, with the largest stockyards west of Fort Worth. Homesteaders moved in and attempted to farm, and the town reached a peak population of nearly 1,000. The area proved unsuitable for farming, though, because of drought, and large ranches soon replaced the small farms. The town suffered a blow from which it never recovered on August 27, 1908, when a massive rainstorm caused a devastating flood, which nearly destroyed the town and killed 18 people. (Flash flooding from the same storm also uncovered the bison bones that George McJunkin found in Dead Horse Arroyo, which later became known as the Folsom site.)

A high school operated briefly in Folsom. Its only graduates were three students in 1931. In 1966, the elementary school at Folsom closed and the students transferred to the school in Des Moines, 8 miles away. Folsom has a post office.

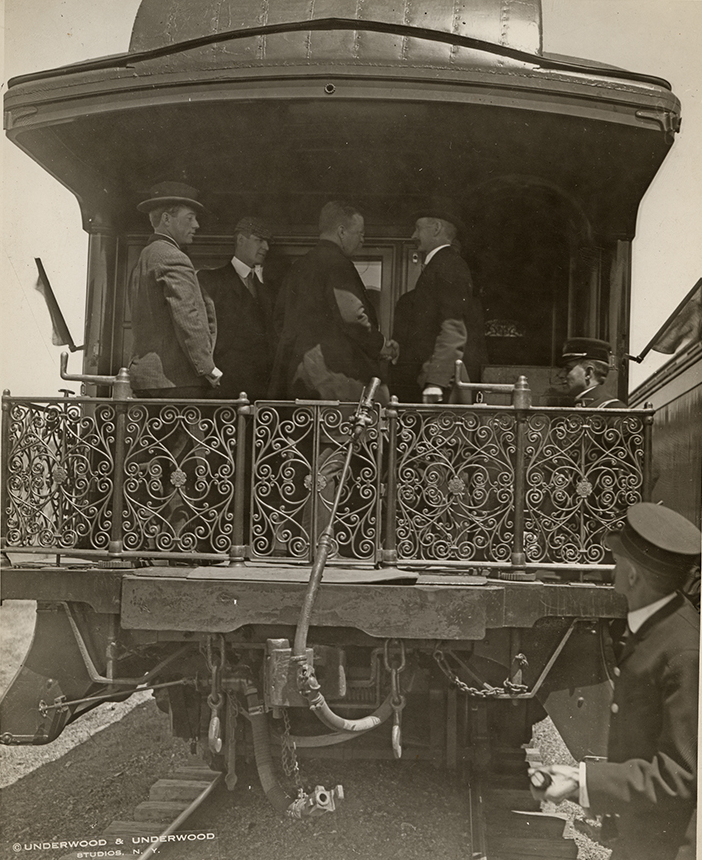
President Theodore Roosevelt in Folsom, 14 April 1905

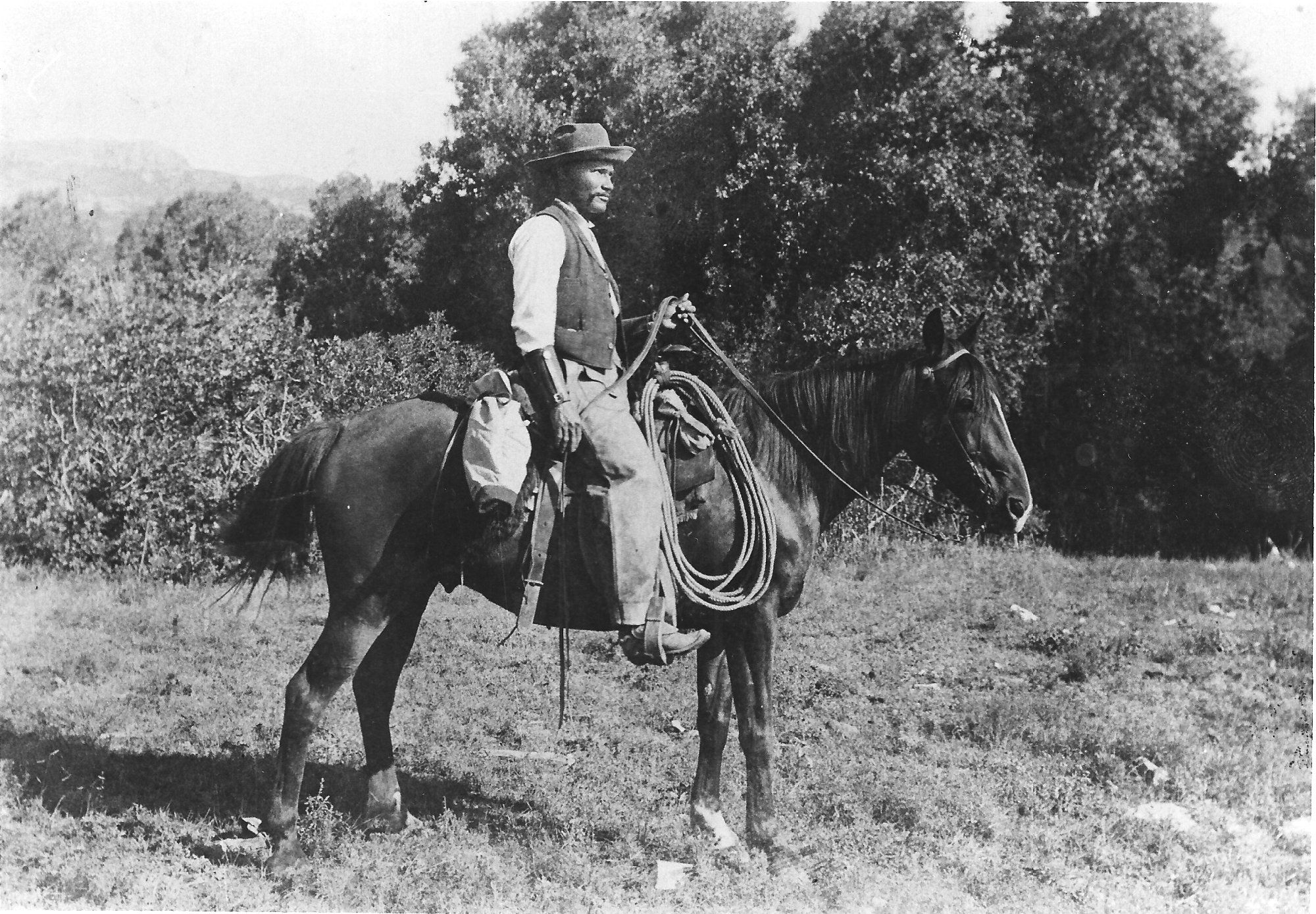
Cowboy George McJunkin, about 1907

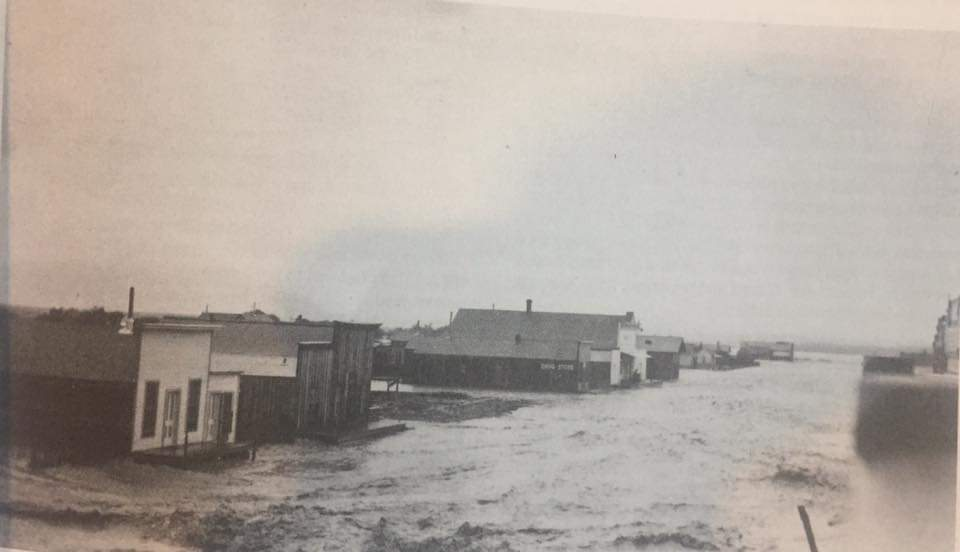
Flood on the main street, 1908

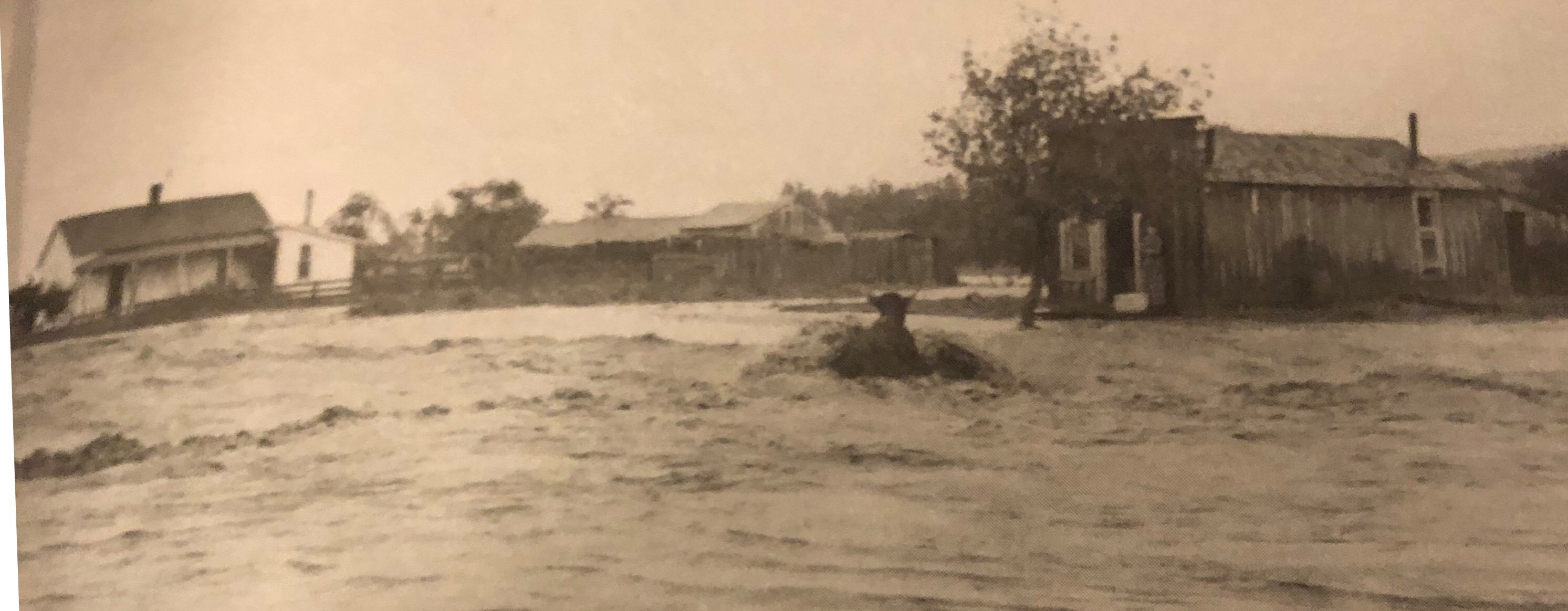
flood, 1908

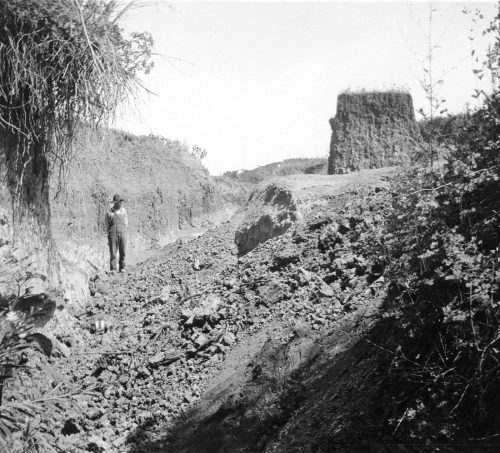
Folsom archeological site Wild horse Arroyo before 1922

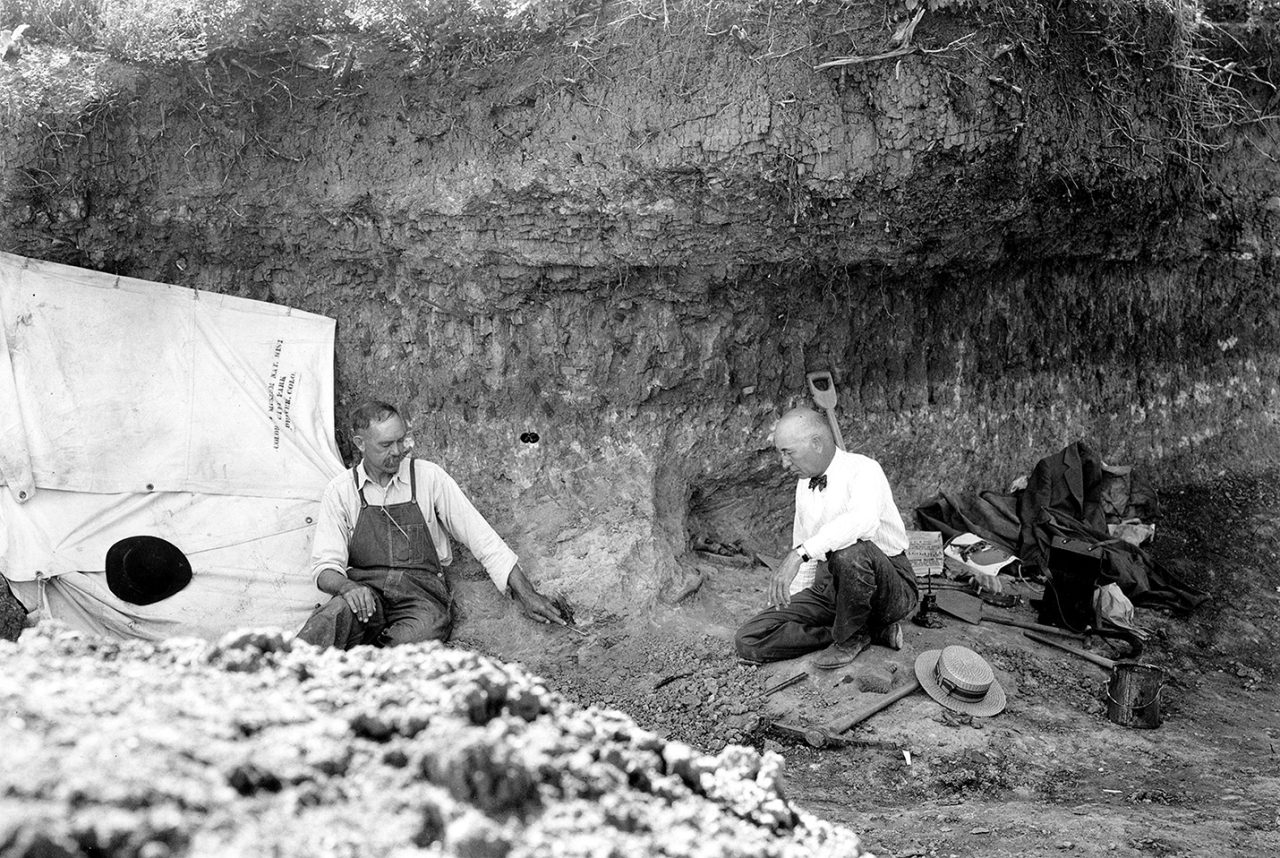
Carl Schwachheim (left) shows the Folsom point, in its original excavation context, to visiting paleontologist Barnum Brown, 4 September 1927

== Geography ==
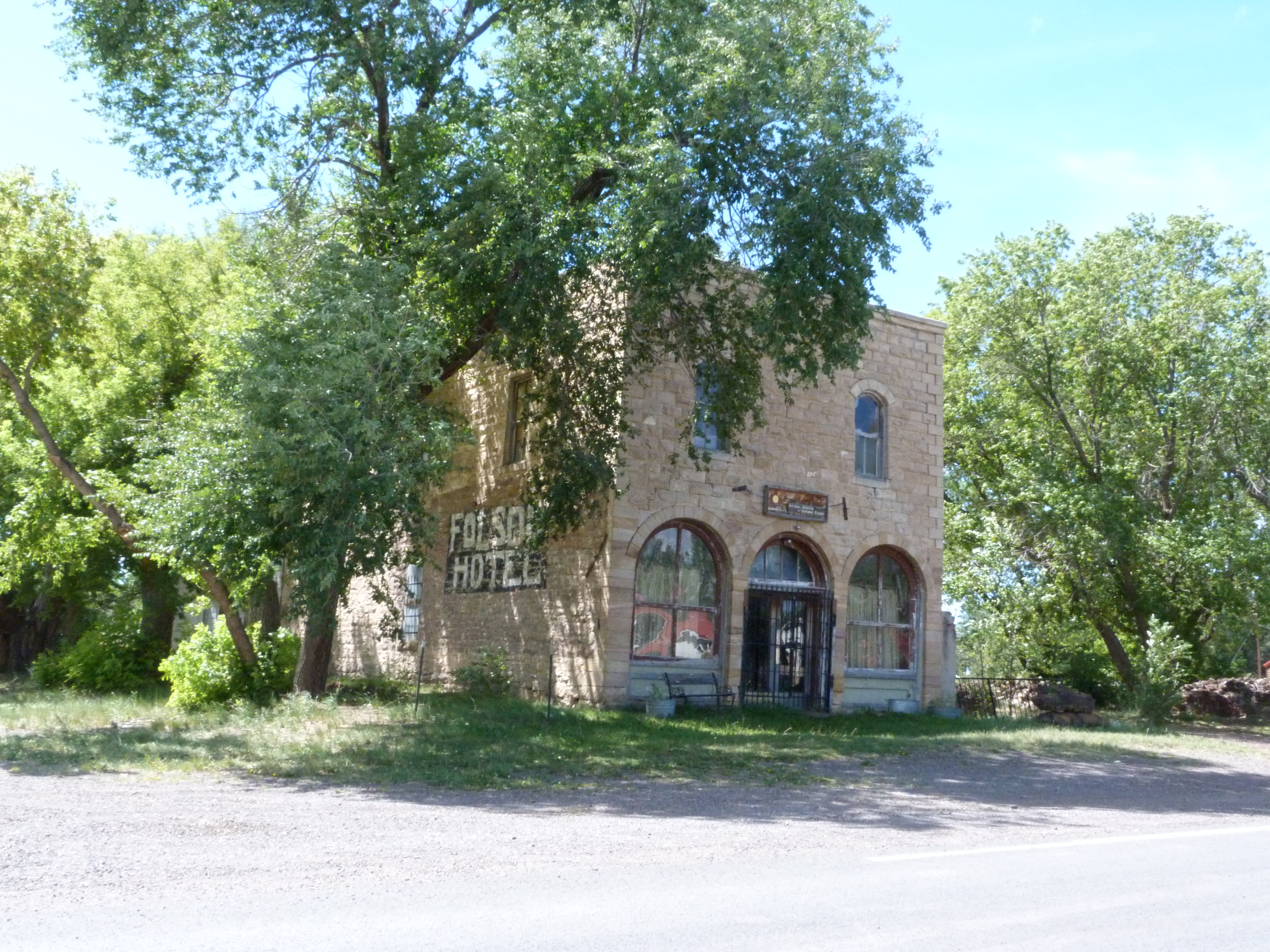
The Folsom Hotel building dates from 1888. Bandit Black Jack Ketchum was held here after his arrest.

According to the United States Census Bureau, the village has a total area of 0.5 sq mi (1.3 km^{2}), all land.

Folsom is situated in a wide valley near the headwaters of the Cimarron River, locally known as the Dry Cimarron, as it runs underground during part of its course through eastern New Mexico. The village is ringed by buttes, mesas, and old volcanic cones and lava flows. Most of the valley is rich grassland, with a pinyon pine and juniper forest found on slopes and in rocky areas. Ponderosa pines are found in canyons and at higher elevations. Large ranches and cattle grazing are typical of the area, although some irrigated agriculture is found downstream from Folsom. Hunting for deer, bear, elk, pronghorn, and turkey is popular on local ranches.

Capulin Volcano National Monument is located 7 mi (11 km) south of Folsom. Rising to 8,182 ft (2,494 m) above sea level, Capulin is the highest mountain near Folsom. Folsom Falls is about 3 miles northeast of the town, along New Mexico State Highway 456. The Cimarron River, only a small stream a few feet wide here, is stocked with trout annually. Eight miles (13 km) west of the city below Johnson Mesa is Wild Horse Arroyo, where in 1908, a cowboy named George McJunkin discovered the bones of an extinct bison. This archaeological find later proved ancient man had been in the Americas at least 10,000 years, far longer than earlier believed.

Folsom is commonly called a "ghost town," as it has hardly any active businesses. Most community life centers around the Folsom Museum, established in 1966 in the Doherty Mercantile building. The museum, with a large collection of local artifacts, sponsors several events each year. It is open seven days a week between Memorial Day and Labor Day.

=== Climate ===
Folsom's elevation moderates summer temperatures. July is the warmest month with an average high temperature of 84 °F (29 °C) and an average low of 56 °F (13 °C). January is the coldest month with an average high temperature of 45 °F (7 °C) and an average low of 17 °F (−8 °C). The highest recorded temperature is 99 °F (37 °C) degrees and the lowest was −28 °F (−33 °C). Folsom receives 18 in (46 cm) of precipitation per year, mostly as summer rainfall, but with about 30 in (76 cm) of snow annually. July and August are the wettest months and January and February are the driest.

== Demographics ==
Historical population
Census	Pop.	Note	%±
1910	484		—
1940	360		—
1950	206		−42.8%
1960	142		−31.1%
1970	75		−47.2%
1980	73		−2.7%
1990	71		−2.7%
2000	75		5.6%
2010	56		−25.3%
2020	51		−8.9%
U.S. Decennial Census

As of the census of 2000, 75 people, 31 households, and 19 families were residing in the village. The population density was 139.1 people/sq mi (53.6/km^{2}). The 44 housing units averaged 81.6/sq mi (31.5/km^{2}). The racial makeup of the village was 73.33% White, 2.67% Native American, 21.33% from other races, and 2.67% from two or more races. Hispanics or Latinos of any race were 34.67% of the population.

Of the 31 households, 35.5% had children under the age of 18 living with them, 48.4% were married couples living together, 12.9% had a female householder with no husband present, and 35.5% were not families. About 35.5% of all households were made up of individuals, and 12.9% had someone living alone who was 65 years of age or older. The average household size was 2.42, and the average family size was 3.15.

In the village, the age distribution was 29.3% under 18, 4.0% from 18 to 24, 34.7% from 25 to 44, 14.7% from 45 to 64, and 17.3% who were 65 or older. The median age was 40 years. For every 100 females, there were 97.4 males. For every 100 females age 18 and over, there were 82.8 males.

The median income for a household in the village was $17,083, and for a family was $25,750. Males had a median income of $23,750 versus $16,000 for females. The per capita income for the village was $9,561. There were 32.0% of families and 35.4% of the population living below the poverty line, including 51.3% of those under 18 and none over 64.

== Notable people ==
- Sally J. Rooke (1840–1908); Telephone operator who perished in the 1908 flood "while at her switchboard warning others of their danger," was designated by the State of New Mexico as a Heroine of New Mexico, and has a monument in her honor adjacent to the Folsom Museum.
- George McJunkin (1856–1922), an African-American man born into slavery in 1856. He educated himself in English and Spanish as well as astronomy, geology, and history. He became a ranch hand in Folsom where he found and identified prehistoric remains. He was knowledgeable enough to interest museums from Colorado to New England, and the site was investigated. In 1926 the culture was named after the town. He did not live to see his find vindicated.

== See also ==
- Folsom tradition
- Johnson Mesa
