= Elm Creek =

Elm Creek is the name of the following locations:

== Places ==
=== In the United States ===
- Elm Creek, Nebraska, Buffalo County
- Elm Creek, Texas, Maverick County

=== Elsewhere ===
- Elm Creek, Manitoba, Canada

== Waterways ==
- Elm Creek (Neosho River), in Morris County, Kansas
- Elm Creek (Blue Earth River tributary), in the Minnesota counties of Jackson, Martin, and Faribault
- Elm Creek (Chariton River), a stream in Schuyler County, Missouri
- Elm Creek (Cheyenne River), a stream in Fall River and Custer counties, South Dakota
- Elm Creek (Nueces River), a tributary of the Nueces River, in Maverick County, Texas
- Elm Creek (Brazos River), a tributary of the Brazos River, McLennan County, Texas
- Elm Creek (Clear Fork Brazos River), a river in Palo Pinto County, Texas
- Elm Creek (Guadalupe County), the name of two separate streams in Guadalupe County, Texas
- Elm Creek (Rio Grande), a tributary of the Rio Grande River, in Maverick County, Texas
- Elm Creek (Wood County, Wisconsin), a stream in Wisconsin

== See also ==
- ELM (disambiguation)
- Elm Creek Township (disambiguation)
- Elm River (disambiguation)
