= Big Cypress (disambiguation) =

Big Cypress may refer to:

- Big Cypress Preserve, Bienville Parish, Louisiana
- Big Cypress Bayou in northeast Texas
- Big Cypress Creek in northeast Texas
- Big Cypress National Preserve, Florida
- Big Cypress Indian Reservation, Florida
- Big Cypress (Phish festival), a weekend-long festival hosted by the band Phish on New Year's Eve 1999
- Big Cypress, Florida, planned community in Collier County
