= Monument Draw =

Monument Draw is either of two ephemeral streams that rise in New Mexico and flow into Texas. Both take their name from Monument Springs, three miles (5 km) west-northwest of Monument, New Mexico. One rises four miles (6 km) west of Monument Springs and flows generally south into the Pecos River. The other rises 11 miles (18 km) east of Monument Springs and south of Hobbs, New Mexico, and flows generally east-southeast to join with Seminole Draw to form Mustang Draw, which then flows generally south to then form Beals Creek, which ultimately flows into the Colorado River of Texas.

== See also ==
- List of rivers of Texas
