= Beech Creek =

Beech Creek may refer to:

== Rivers ==
- Beech Creek (Pennsylvania), a tributary of Bald Eagle Creek
- Beech Creek (Texas)
- Beech Creek (Logan County, West Virginia)

== Communities ==
- Beech Creek, Kentucky, an unincorporated community in Muhlenberg County
- Beech Creek, Clay County, Kentucky, a creek and a wildlife area
- Beech Creek, Oregon, an unincorporated community in Grant County
- Beech Creek, Pennsylvania, a borough in Clinton County
- Beech Creek, Tennessee, an unincorporated community in Wayne County
- Beech Creek Township, Greene County, Indiana
- Beech Creek Township, Pennsylvania

== Other ==
- Beech Creek Railroad, a defunct railroad in Pennsylvania
- Beech Creek National Scenic Area, near Big Cedar, Oklahoma
