= White Oak, Titus County, Texas =

Unincorporated community in Texas, US

White Oak
- Unincorporated community
- Location in Texas
- Coordinates: 33°17′21″N 95°00′37″W
- Country: United States
- State: Texas
- County: Titus
- Named for: White Oak Creek
- Elevation: 351 ft (107 m)

Population (2000)
  - Total: 100
- USGS Feature ID: 2034830

White Oak is an unincorporated community in Titus County, Texas, United States.

== History ==
White Oak is situated on Farm to Market Road 2152, and is named after White Oak Creek. It began as a black farming community, and was connected to Piney, but were gradually divided by Piney Creek. Landowner George Baker was the probably the first settler. By 1984, the town had a school, two churches and a town hall. It reached a population of 100 in 2000.
