= List of rivers of Texas =

The list of rivers of Texas is a list of all named waterways, including rivers and streams that partially pass through or are entirely located within the U.S. state of Texas. Across the state, there are 3,700 named streams and 15 major rivers accounting for over 191,000 mi (307,000 km) of waterways. All of the state's waterways drain towards the Mississippi River, the Texas Gulf Coast, or the Rio Grande, with mouths located in seven major estuaries.

== Seasonal and restrictive waterways ==
- Aransas River
- Armand Bayou
- Arroyo Colorado
- Attoyac Bayou
- Austin Bayou
- Barton Creek
- Bastrop Bayou
- Bedias Creek
- Beech Creek
- Beef Head Creek
- Big Cow Creek
- Big Cypress Bayou
- Big Cypress Creek
- Big Mineral Creek
- Big Pine Creek
- Big Sandy Creek
- Bois D'Arc Creek
- Buffalo Bayou
- Caney Creek (Red River tributary)
- Catfish Creek
- Cedar Bayou
- Chacon Creek
- Cibolo Creek
- Clear Creek
- Coffee Mill Creek
- Coleto Creek
- Comal River
- Buffalo Soldier Draw
- Denton Creek
- Dickinson Bayou
- Double Bayou, East Fork
- Garcitas Creek
  - Marcado Creek
- Highland Bayou
- Hurst Creek
- Keechi Creek
- Lake Charlotte Creek (Lake Pass)
- Little Cypress Bayou
- Navasota River
- Onion Creek

== Waterways by drainage basin ==
This list is arranged by drainage basin, with tributaries indented under each larger stream's name listed in order from mouth to source.

=== Mississippi River ===
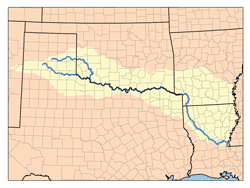
Red River Drainage Basin

- Mississippi River (LA, AR)
  - Red River
    - Cross Bayou
      - Twelvemile Bayou (LA)
        - Black Bayou
        - Big Cypress Bayou
          - Little Cypress Bayou
          - Black Cypress Bayou
          - Big Cypress Creek
    - Sulphur River
      - White Oak Creek
      - North Sulphur River
      - South Sulphur River
    - Pecan Bayou
    - Big Pine Creek
    - Sanders Creek
    - Bois D'Arc Creek
      - Coffee Mill Creek
    - Caney Creek (Red River tributary)
    - Washita River
    - Big Mineral Creek
    - Little Wichita River
    - Wichita River
      - Holliday Creek
      - Beaver Creek
      - North Wichita River
        - Middle Fork Wichita River
      - South Wichita River
    - Pease River
      - Catfish Creek
      - North Pease River
        - Quitaque Creek
      - Middle Pease River
        - Tongue River
    - Wanderers Creek
    - Groesbeck Creek
    - North Fork Red River
      - Elm Fork Red River
      - Sweetwater Creek
      - McClellan Creek
    - Salt Fork Red River
    - Prairie Dog Town Fork Red River
      - Buck Creek
      - Mulberry Creek
      - Tule Creek
      - Little Red River (Texas)
      - Palo Duro Creek
      - Tierra Blanca Creek
  - Arkansas River (AR, OK)
    - Canadian River
      - North Canadian River
        - Beaver River
          - Kiowa Creek
          - Palo Duro Creek
          - Coldwater Creek
        - Wolf Creek
      - Punta de Agua Creek
        - Rita Blanca Creek
          - Carrizo Creek (New Mexico/Texas)

=== Gulf of Mexico Coastal ===
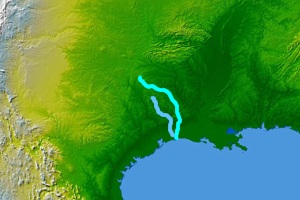
The Sabine and Neches rivers

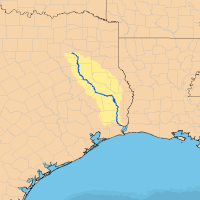
Neches Drainage Basin

- Sabine River
  - Big Cow Creek
  - Big Sandy Creek
  - Lake Fork Creek
    - Rainwater Creek
- Neches River
  - Pine Island Bayou
  - Village Creek
    - Beech Creek
    - Big Sandy Creek
  - Angelina River
    - Ayish Bayou
    - Attoyac Bayou
    - Mud Creek
  - Piney Creek
- Taylor Bayou
- Oyster Bayou
- Double Bayou
  - Double Bayou, East Fork
  - West Fork Double Bayou

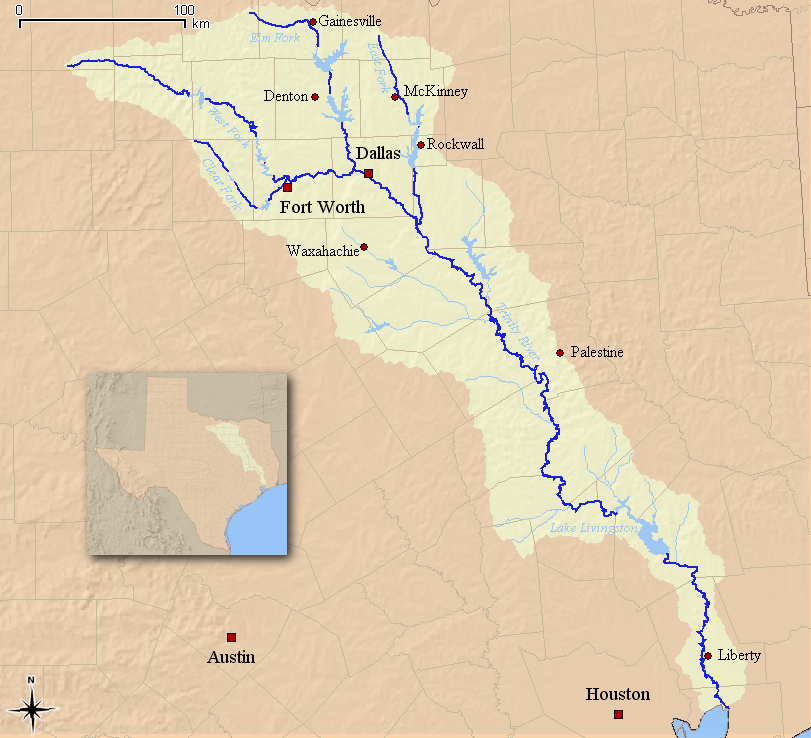
Trinity Drainage Basin

- Trinity River
  - Lake Charlotte Creek (Lake Pass)
  - Bedias Creek
  - Keechi Creek
  - Tehuacana Creek
  - Richland Creek
    - Chambers Creek
  - Cedar Creek
    - Kings Creek
  - Red Oak Creek
  - East Fork Trinity River
  - White Rock Creek
  - Turtle Creek
  - Elm Fork Trinity River
    - Bachman Branch
    - Denton Creek
    - Clear Creek
    - Furneaux Creek
    - Isle du Bois Creek
      - Range Creek
  - West Fork Trinity River
    - Johnson Creek
    - Clear Fork Trinity River
    - Big Sandy Creek
- Cedar Bayou

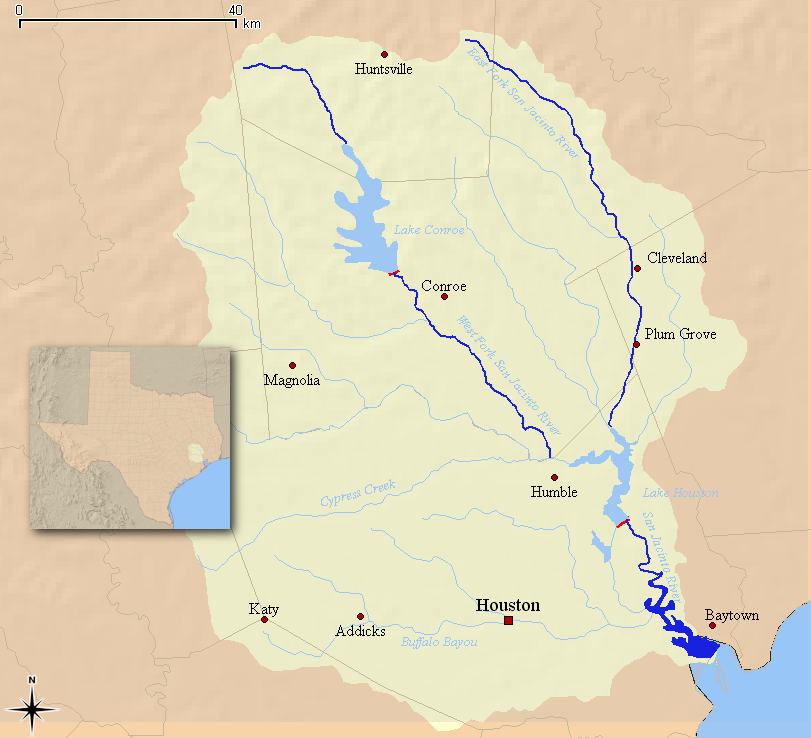
San Jacinto Drainage Basin

- San Jacinto River
  - Buffalo Bayou
    - Vince Bayou
    - Whiteoak Bayou
    - Brays Bayou
  - East Fork San Jacinto River
    - Caney Creek
      - Peach Creek
  - West Fork San Jacinto River
    - Spring Creek
      - Cypress Creek
    - Lake Creek
- Clear Creek
  - Armand Bayou
- Dickinson Bayou
- Highland Bayou
- Chocolate Bayou
- Bastrop Bayou
- Cow Bayou
  - Austin Bayou
- Oyster Creek

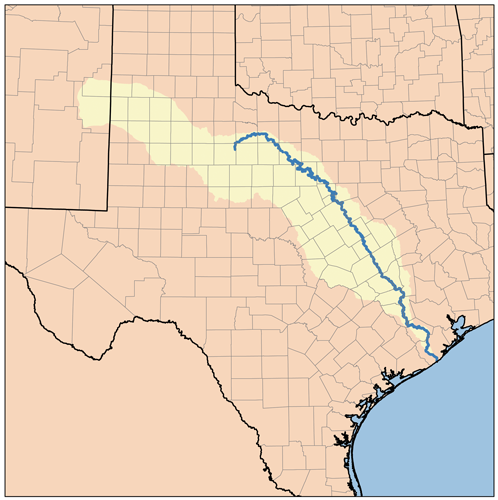
Brazos Drainage Basin

- Brazos River
  - Mill Creek
  - Navasota River
  - Yegua Creek
  - Nolan River
  - Little Brazos River
  - Little River
    - San Gabriel River
      - Brushy Creek
    - Leon River
    - Lampasas River
      - Cowhouse Creek
      - Sabana River
  - Tehuacana Creek
  - Bosque River
    - North Bosque River
      - East Bosque River
      - Mustang Creek
    - South Bosque River
      - Middle Bosque River
  - Aquilla Creek
  - Paluxy River
  - Palo Pinto Creek
  - Clear Fork Brazos River
    - Hubbard Creek
    - Paint Creek
    - Elm Creek
    - Sweetwater Creek
  - Elm Creek
  - Millers Creek
  - Double Mountain Fork Brazos River
    - North Fork Double Mountain Fork Brazos River
      - Blackwater Draw
      - Yellow House Draw
      - Yellow House Canyon
  - Salt Fork Brazos River
    - Croton Creek
    - Duck Creek
    - White River
      - Running Water Draw
- San Bernard River
- Caney Creek (Matagorda Bay)

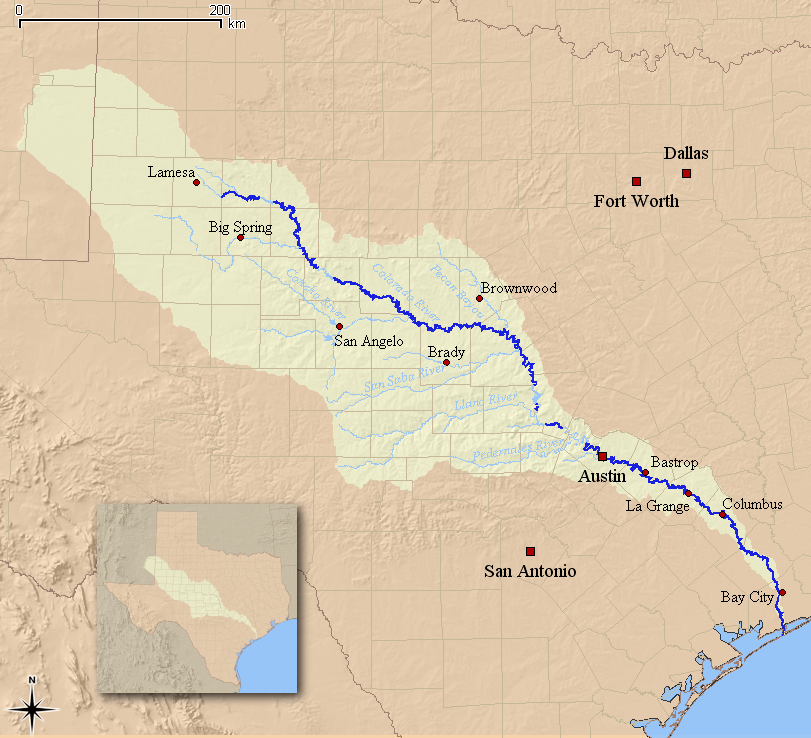
Colorado River Drainage Basin

- Colorado River
  - Cummins Creek
  - Bull Creek
  - Onion Creek
  - Barton Creek
  - Shoal Creek
  - Gilleland Creek
    - Harris Branch
  - Pedernales River
  - Llano River
    - Gentry Creek
    - North Llano River
    - South Llano River
  - San Saba River
    - Brady Creek
  - Pecan Bayou
    - Jim Ned Creek
  - Home Creek
    - Loss Creek
  - Concho River
    - Kickapoo Creek
    - North Concho River
    - South Concho River
      - Spring Creek (Tom Green County, Texas)
      - Middle Concho River
  - Beals Creek
    - Mustang Draw
      - Johnson Draw
      - McKenzie Draw
      - Monument Draw
      - Seminole Draw
    - Sulphur Springs Draw
- Tres Palacios Creek
- Carancahua Creek
- Lavaca River
  - Navidad River
    - Sandy Creek
- Garcitas Creek

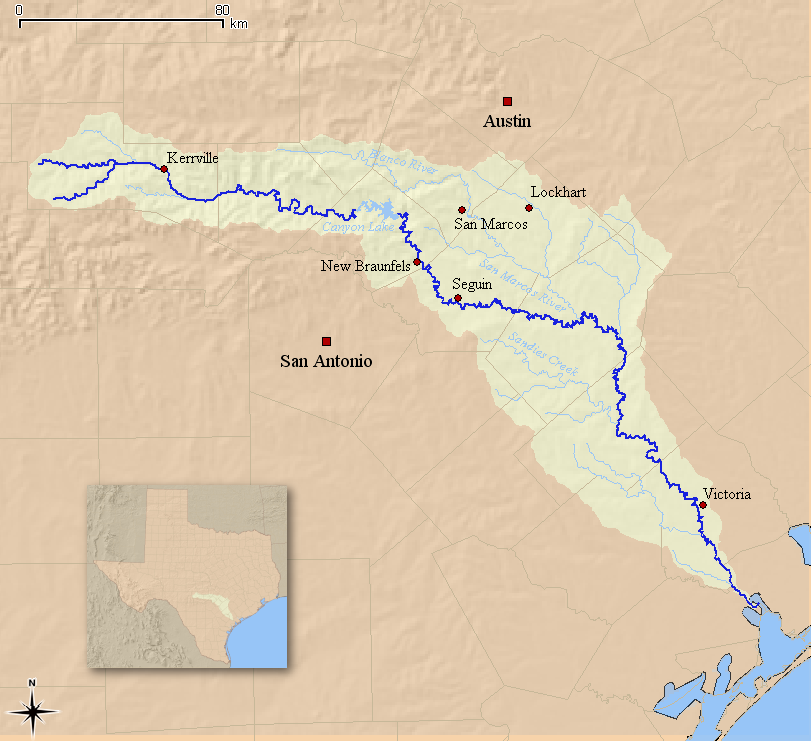
Guadalupe Drainage Basin

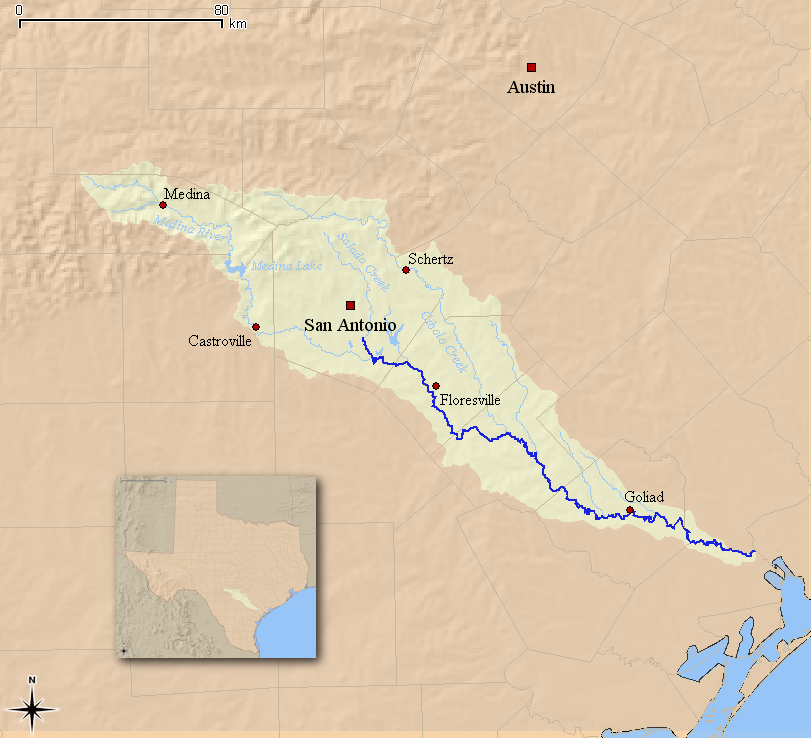
San Antonio Drainage Basin

- Guadalupe River
  - San Antonio River
    - Cibolo Creek
      - Martinez Creek
        - Woman Hollering Creek
    - Kicaster Creek
    - Calaveras Creek
    - Chupaderas Creek
    - Medina River
    - Salado Creek
      - Rosillo Creek
  - Coleto Creek
  - Sandies Creek
  - Peach Creek
  - San Marcos River
    - Plum Creek
    - Blanco River
  - Comal River
- Capano Creek
- Mission River
  - Blanco Creek
  - Medio Creek
- Aransas River

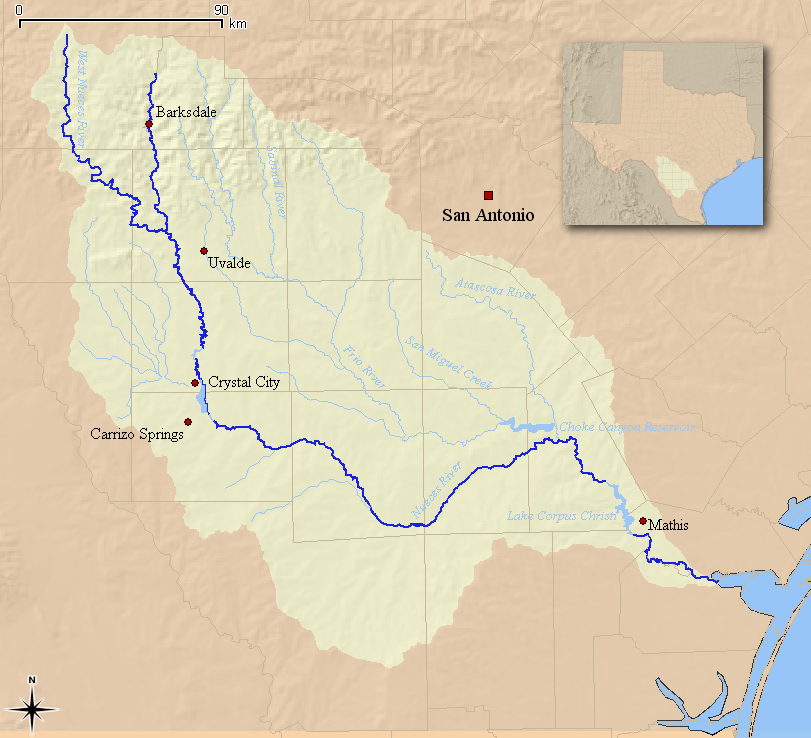
Nueces Drainage Basin

- Nueces River
  - Frio River
    - Atascosa River
    - San Miguel Creek
    - Leona River
    - Hondo Creek
      - Tehuacana Creek
    - Sabinal River
    - Blanco Creek
  - Turkey Creek
  - West Nueces River
  - Rincon Bayou
- Oso Creek
- Petronila Creek
- San Fernando Creek
  - Santa Gertrudis Creek
  - Carreta Creek
- Los Olmos Creek
- Arroyo Colorado

=== Rio Grande ===
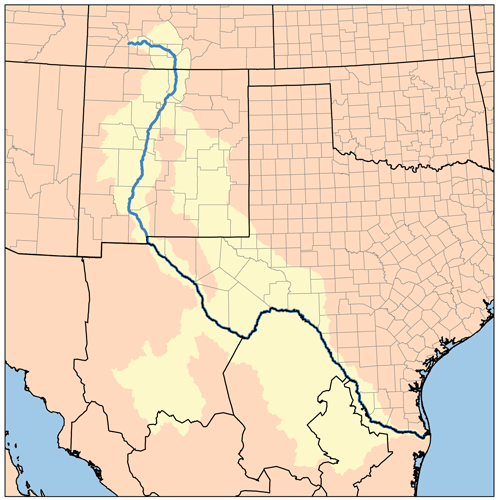
Rio Grande Drainage Basin

- Rio Grande
  - Brownsville Ship Channel
  - Devils River
    - Dry Devils River
  - Pecos River
    - Howard Draw
    - Independence Creek
    - Tunas Creek
    - Coyanosa Draw
    - Toyah Creek
      - Barilla Draw
      - Salt Draw
    - Delaware River
  - San Francisco Creek
  - Maravillas Creek
  - Terlingua Creek
    - Calamity Creek
  - Alamito Creek
  - Chacon Creek
    - San Ygnacio Creek
  - Zacate Creek
  - San Ildefonso Creek
  - Sombrerillito Creek
  - Santa Isabel Creek

== 10 longest rivers ==
The following 10 rivers empty into the Gulf of Mexico. Four of the rivers are tributaries: The Pecos flows into the Rio Grande, the Red into the Mississippi River, and the Sabine and Neches flow into Sabine Lake which is connected to the Gulf of Mexico by Sabine Pass. The Canadian is a tributary of a tributary and flows into the Arkansas River which is itself a tributary of the Mississippi.

1. Rio Grande – 1,896 miles (3,051 km), 1,250 miles (2,010 km) of which are in Texas (although technically on the border between Texas and Mexico)
2. Red River – 1,360 miles (2,190 km) of which 680 miles (1,090 km) are in Texas
3. Brazos River – 1,280 miles (2,060 km) of which 840 miles (1,350 km) are in Texas, making it the longest section of river in Texas
4. Pecos River – 926 miles (1,490 km) most of which is in New Mexico
5. Colorado River – 862 miles (1,387 km) almost entirely in Texas of which 600 miles (970 km) are not dry
6. Canadian River – 760 miles (1,220 km) of which 200 miles (320 km) are in Texas
7. Trinity River – 423 miles (681 km) entirely in Texas
8. Sabine River – 360 miles (580 km) of which 360 miles (580 km) are in Texas
9. Neches River – 416 miles (669 km) entirely in Texas
10. Nueces River – 315 miles (507 km) entirely in Texas

The Trinity River is the longest river with its entire drainage basin in Texas. The Colorado is the longest river with both its source based on river name and its mouth in the state. The longest source of the Colorado of any kind is in New Mexico.

== Shortest river ==
The Comal River is the shortest river in the state of Texas and the fifth-shortest river in the United States. Located entirely within the city limits of New Braunfels in Central Texas, its spring-fed waters run a distance of 2.5 miles (4 kilometers).

== See also ==
- List of rivers in the United States
- List of geographical regions in Texas
