= Teacup (disambiguation) =

Teacup refers to a small drinking vessel.

Teacup may also refer to:

== Places ==
- Teacup, Texas, a ghost town in Kimble County, Texas
- Teacup Mountain, a mountain in Kimble County near Gentry Creek
- Teacup Lake, see the list of lakes in Beaverhead County, Montana
- Teacup Ski Trail, see the list of trails of Montana

== Other uses ==
- Teacup (TV series), American TV show on Peacock
- Teacups, an amusement ride
- Teacup size, an unofficial term for the smallest toy dogs, dwarf cats, and miniature pigs, such as the Teacup Persian
- The teacup, a British culinary measurement unit

== See also ==
- Tea bowl (disambiguation)
