= Palo Duro =

Palo Duro can refer to:

- Palo Duro Canyon, a canyon system in Texas, U.S.
- Palo Duro Creek, a river in Texas, U.S.
- Palo Duro High School, a high school in the Amarillo Independent School District, Texas, U.S.
- Palo Duro Records, a U.S. record label

== See also ==
- Battle of Palo Duro Canyon
