= Marcado Creek =

Coordinates: 28.8311°N 96.7436°W

- Map

Location
- Country: United States
- State: Texas

Marcado Creek is a 15-mile (24 km) stream in Victoria County, Texas, in the United States. It is a tributary of Garcitas Creek.

Marcado is a name derived from Spanish meaning "branded".

== See also ==
- List of rivers of Texas
