= Lake O' the Pines =

Reservoir in Texas, United States

Lake O’ the Pines
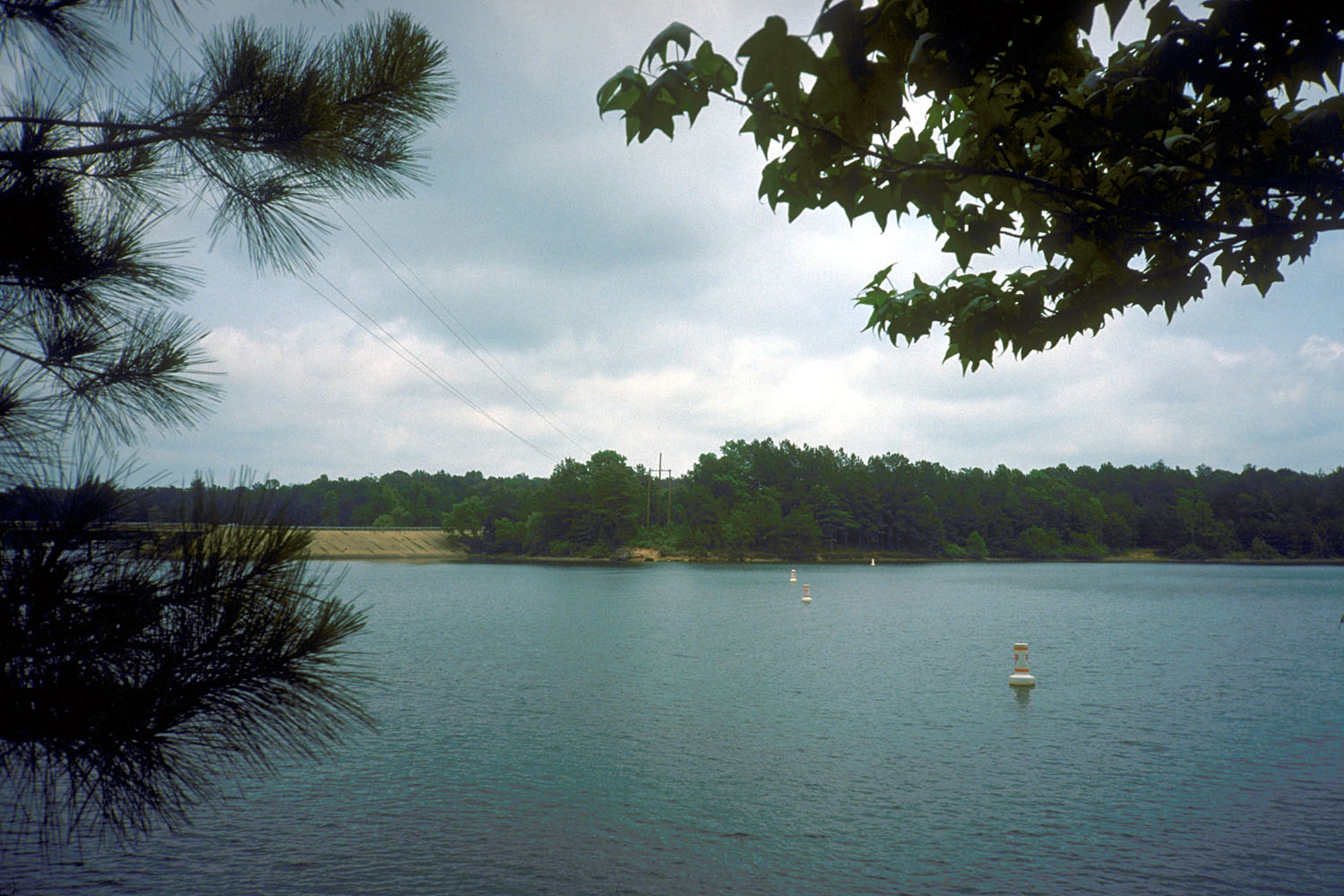

- Location within Texas Location within the United States
- Location: Marion, Camnp, Upshur, and Morris counties in Texas, United States
- Coordinates: 32°46′15″N 94°32′37″W
- Type: reservoir
- Primary inflows: Big Cypress Bayou (Big Cypress Creek)
- Primary outflows: Big Cypress Bayou
- Catchment area: 850 sq mi (2,201 km^{2})
- Basin countries: United States
- Surface area: 18,680 acres (76 km^{2})
- Water volume: 250,000 acre⋅ft (0.31 km^{3})
- Surface elevation: 230 ft (70.1 m)

Lake O’ the Pines is a reservoir on Big Cypress Bayou, also known as Big Cypress Creek, chiefly in Marion County, Texas, United States. The reservoir also occupies a small part of Camp, Upshur, and Morris Counties. The dam is located approximately 8.5 miles (13.7 km) west of Jefferson.

== History ==
Lake O’ the Pines (formerly known as "Ferrell's Bridge Reservoir") was created by the construction of the Ferrells Bridge Dam on the Big Cypress Bayou approximately 81 miles (130 km) upstream from the bayou's confluence with the Red River. The reservoir was created as part of the overall plan for flood control in the Red River Basin below Denison Dam in Oklahoma. The project was authorized by the Flood Control Act of 1946. Additional purposes of wildlife conservation, recreation, and water supply were added during construction. The U.S. Army Corps of Engineers began construction of the dam in January 1955 and the dam was completed on December 11, 1959.

== Dam and reservoir ==
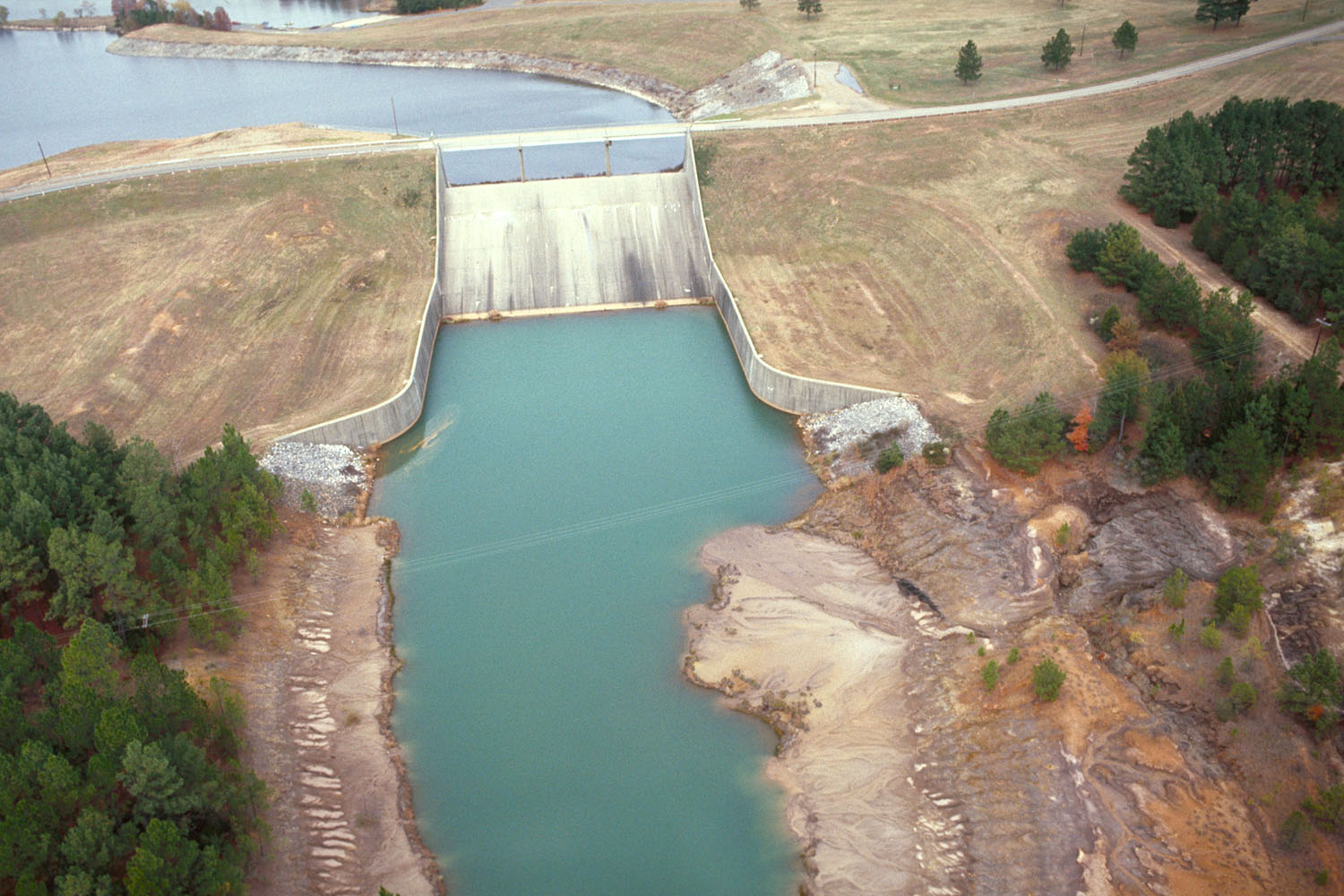
The spillway at Ferrells Bridge Dam

The concrete-and-earthfill dam is 10,600 feet (3,231 m) long. The crest of the spillway is 249.5 feet (76.0 m) above mean sea level. The conservation storage capacity is 250,000 acre-feet (310,000,000 m^{3}) with a surface area of 18,680 acres (76 km^{2}). The bayou has a length of 140 miles (225 km) and a total drainage area of 850 square miles (2,201 km^{2}). The lake's normal conservation pool is 230 feet (70 m) above mean sea level. The lake provides water supply storage for the Northeast Texas Municipal Water District which serves the cities of Jefferson, Ore City, Lone Star, Avinger, Hughes Springs, Daingerfield, and most recently Longview. The water supply storage exists in the conservation pool between elevations 201 to 230 feet (70 m). Water intake structures are located at various points on the lake and one downstream of the lake. Discharges from the two gates in the control structure located on the southeast end vary from a minimum of 5 cu ft/s (0.14 m^{3}/s) to a maximum of 3,000 cu ft/s (85 m^{3}/s).

== Monstrous Catfish ==
Lake O' the Pines has long been known to be home to giant catfish. Legend has it that some of the catfish are so big as to be called monstrous. Most people consider this to be part of fishing folklore as evidence has never been found.

== See also ==
- List of dams and reservoirs in Texas
