= Isle du Bois Creek =

Isle du Bois Creek may refer to:

- Isle du Bois Creek (Missouri)
- Isle du Bois Creek (Texas)
