= Odell, Texas =

Unincorporated community in Texas, US

Odell
- Unincorporated community
- Location within Texas Location within the United States
- Coordinates: 34°20′45″N 99°25′08″W
- Country: United States
- State: Texas
- County: Wilbarger

Population (2000)
  - Total: 131

Odell is an unincorporated community in Wilbarger County, Texas, United States. According to the Handbook of Texas, the community had an estimated population of 131 in 2000.

== Geography ==
Odell is located at 34°20′45″N 99°25′08″W. It is situated at the junction of Farm Roads 91, 432, and 2379 in northwestern Wilbarger County, approximately 15 miles northwest of Vernon.

Wanderers Creek borders the community to the west.

== History ==
The community was founded in 1908 as a railroad station on the Kansas City, Mexico and Orient Railway. It was named after New York civil engineer J. T. Odell. Many of Odell's early residents came from Haulk, a nearby settlement. Upon the arrival of the railroad, a number of Haulk citizens were lured to a better location on land donated by T. H. Holloway. A post office was established on April 27, 1909. By 1919, thirty businesses were operating in Odell and the community thrived throughout the 1920s. In 1928, Odell was incorporated. The population was 424 at the 1930 census. Within a short time, however, the community began to decline. Several factors, including the Great Depression and a series of fires in the mid–1930s, accelerated the level of decline. The population fell to 301 in 1940, 238 in 1950, and 131 in 1960. Soon after, Odell reverted to the status of an unincorporated community. By the mid–1980s, a few stores and churches remained active in Odell. Cotton, cattle, grain, and oil formed the base of the local economy. Throughout the latter half of the twentieth century and into 2000, Odell was home to approximately 131 residents.

== Education ==
Public education in the community of Odell is provided by the Chillicothe Independent School District.
