= Delaware River (disambiguation) =

Delaware River could refer to:

- Delaware River, a major river on the coast of the Atlantic Ocean, in New York, New Jersey, Pennsylvania, and Delaware
  - the namesake for the Philadelphia metropolitan area, called the Delaware Valley
- Delaware River (Kansas), a tributary of the Kansas River in Kansas
- Delaware River (Texas), a tributary of the Pecos River in Texas and New Mexico
