= Rainwater Creek =

Coordinates: 32°48′43″N 95°31′10″W

Location
- Country: United States

Physical characteristics
- Source
  - location: Northeast Texas, near the Lake Fork Reservoir
- Length: 3.9 mi (6.3 km)

Rainwater Creek is a 3.9-mile-long (6.3 km) tributary stream of Lake Fork Creek. It flows into Lake Fork Creek downstream from the Lake Fork Reservoir Dam approximately four miles west of Quitman in western Wood County, Texas. Its primary source is a spring, augmented by stormwater runoff. It is named for the family of William Walton Rainwater, who was among the earliest permanent settlers of the area.

== See also ==
- List of rivers of Texas
