= Capano =

Capano is a variant of the more numerous Italian surname Capuano. It is most prevalent in the southeastern regions of Calabria and Campania and is also to be found among the American, Brazilian and Argentinian Italian diaspora. Notable people with the surname include:

- Craig Capano (born 1985), American soccer player
- Thomas Capano (1949–2011), disbarred American lawyer and former Delaware deputy attorney general

== See also ==
- Capano Creek, river in Texas
