= Treaty of Tehuacana Creek =

1844 treaty between Texas and Native Americans

The Treaty of Tehuacana Creek (or the Treaty of Peace, Friendship and Commerce) was signed at Tehuacana Creek on October 9, 1844 between representatives from the Republic of Texas and various Native American tribes. The tribes involved in the signing of the treaty were the Comanche, the Keechi, the Waco, Caddo, Anadarko, Ioni, Delaware, Shawnee, Cherokee, Lipan Apache, and Tawakoni tribes. Based on the terms of the treaty, both Native Americans and Texans agreed to cease all hostilities and establish more cooperative political and commercial ties.

The terms of the treaty were very similar to the terms of the Treaty of Bird's Fort, signed the previous year between Texas and some of the other Indian chiefs.

The treaty comprised 22 articles:

Article I. Both parties agree and declare, that they will forever live in peace, and always meet as friends and brothers. The tomahawk shall be buried, and no more blood appear in the path between them now made white. The Great Spirit will look with delight upon their friendship, and will frown in anger upon their enmity.

Article II. …the Government of Texas shall permit no bad men to cross the line into the hunting grounds of the Indians; and that if the Indians should find any such among them, they will bring him or them to some one of the agents, but not do any, harm to his or their person or property.

Article III. …the Indians will make no treaty with any nation at war with the people of Texas; and, also, that they will bring in and give up to some one of the agents of the Government of Texas, any and all persons who may go among them for the purpose of making or talking of war.

Article IV. …if the Indians know of any tribe who may be going to make war upon the people of Texas, or steal their property, they will notify the whites of the fact through some one of the agents, and prevent such tribe or tribes from carrying out their intentions.

Article V. …the Indians shall no more steal horses or other property from the whites; and if any property should be stolen, or other mischief done by the bad men among the tribes, that they will punish those who do so and restore the property taken to some one of the agents.

Article VI. …the Indians will not trade with any other people than the people of Texas, so long as they can get such goods as they need at the trading houses.

Article VII. …the Government of Texas shall establish trading houses for the convenience and benefit of the Indians, and such articles shall be kept for the Indian trade as they may need for their support and comfort.

Article VIII. …when peace is fully established between the white and the red people, and no more war or trouble exists, the Indians shall be supplied with powder, lead, guns, spears and other arms to enable them to kill game and live in plenty.

Article IX. …they will not permit traders to go among them unless they are sent by the Government of Texas, or its officers.

Article X. …the Indians will not sell any property to the whites, except such as are authorized to trade with them by the Government of Texas.

Article XI. …the President shall appoint good men to trade with the Indians at the trading houses, so that they may not be cheated; and, also, that he shall appoint good men as agents who will speak the truth to the Indians and bear their talks to him.

Article XII. …if the trading houses should be established below the line, to be run and marked, the Indians shall be permitted to cross the line for the purpose of coming to trade.

Article XIII. …no whiskey, or other intoxicating liquor, shall be sold to the Indians or furnished to them upon any pretext, either within their own limits or in any other place whatsoever.

Article XIV. …the government of Texas shall make such presents to the Indians as the President from time to time shall deem proper.

Article XV. …the President may send among the Indians such blacksmiths and other mechanics, as he may think best, for their benefit; and also that he may send schoolmasters and families for the purpose of instructing them in a knowledge of the English language and Christian religion, as well as other persons to teach them how to cultivate the soil and raise corn.

Article XVI. …if the President should at any time send men among them to work mines, or agents to travel with them over their hunting grounds, the Indians will treat them with friendship and aid them as brothers.

Article XVII. …hereafter, if the Indians go to war they will not kill women and children, or take them prisoners, or injure them in any way; and that they will only fight against warriors who have arms in their hands.

Article XVIII. …they never will, in peace or war, harm any man that carries a white flag; but receive him as a friend and let him return again to his people in peace.

Article XIX. …they will mutually surrender and deliver up all the prisoners which they have of the other party for their own prisoners; and that they will not be friendly with any people or nation, or enter into treaty with them, who will take prisoners from Texas, or do its citizens any injury.

Article XX. …if ever hereafter trouble should grow up between the whites and the Indians, they will immediately come with a white flag to some one of the agents and explain to him the facts; and he will send a messenger to the President, who will remove all trouble out of the path between the white and the red brothers.

Article XXI. …there shall be a general council held once a year, where chiefs from both the whites and the Indians shall attend. At the council presents will be made to the chiefs.

Article XXII. …the President may make such arrangements and regulations with the several tribes of Indians as he may think best for their peace and happiness.

== See also ==
- List of treaties
- Comanche history
