= Piney, Texas =

Ghost town in Texas, US

Piney
- Ghost town
- Location in Texas
- Coordinates: 33.27039410°N 94.97465840°W
- Country: United States
- State: Texas
- County: Titus
- Named for: Piney Creek

Piney is a ghost town in Titus County, Texas, United States.

== History ==
Piney began as a black church and school after the American Civil War. Henry Steward, Joe Cooper, Louis Gipson, Judge Nelson and Pap Sharell were the town's first settlers. It used to be connected to White Oak, but was gradually divided by Piney Creek, which is also its namesake. Its school was consolidated with another district by 1932.
