= Black Cypress Bayou =

Coordinates: 32.77070°N 94.28825°W

Location
- Country: United States

Physical characteristics
- Source
  - location: Texas

Black Cypress Bayou is a 23.3-mile-long (37.5 km) river in the U.S. state of Texas. It is a tributary of Big Cypress Bayou and is part of the Red River watershed.

== See also ==
- List of rivers of Texas
