= Barilla Draw =

Coordinates: 31°20′12″N 103°23′05″W

Location
- Country: United States

Physical characteristics
- Source
  - location: Reeves County, Texas

Barilla Draw is a draw in Reeves County, Texas.

== See also ==
- List of rivers of Texas
