= San Miguel Creek (Texas) =

Coordinates: 28°30′49.97″N 98°25′7.05″W

Location
- Country: United States

Physical characteristics
- Source
  - location: Texas

San Miguel Creek is a river in Texas.

== See also ==
- List of rivers of Texas
