= Tule Creek =

Coordinates: 34°40′35″N 101°14′06″W

Location
- Country: United States

Physical characteristics
- Source
  - location: Texas

Tule Creek is a river in Texas.

== See also ==
- List of rivers of Texas
- Tule Creek (Temecula Creek), California
