= Attoyac River =

Coordinates: 31°42′40″N 94°24′52″W

Attoyac Bayou

Location
- Country: United States

Physical characteristics
- Source
  - location: Texas

The Attoyac Bayou (/ˈætəjæk/ AT-ə-yak) is a river in eastern Texas. As to the naming, the locals, historical records, and the state of Texas use the phrase 'bayou' but, since 1984, the USGS uses the term 'river'. It flows through Nacogdoches, San Augustine, Shelby and Rusk counties of east Texas. It is a tributary to the Angelina River which it enters within the Sam Rayburn Reservoir.

The Attoyac Bayou is the eponym of Attoyac, Texas.

== See also ==
- List of rivers of Texas
