= Los Olmos Creek =

Location
- Country: United States
- State: Texas

Physical characteristics
- Mouth
  - location: 27.2784°N 97.7953°W

Los Olmos Creek is a river in the U.S. state of Texas.

== See also ==
- List of rivers of Texas
