= Big Cypress Creek =

Coordinates: 32.75125°N 94.50187°W

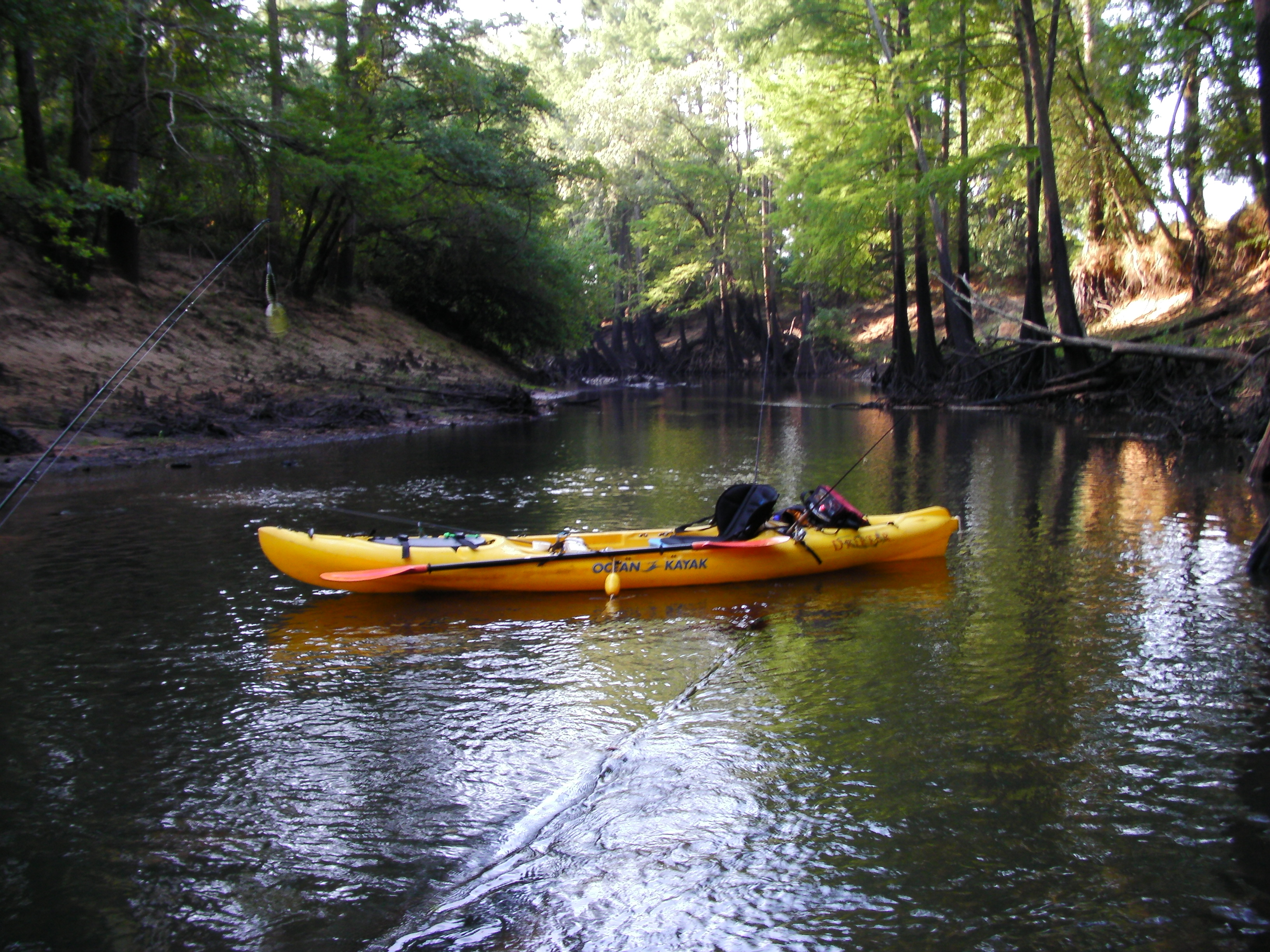
- Big Cypress Creek near Jefferson

Location
- Country: United States

Physical characteristics
- Source
  - location: Texas

Big Cypress Creek is an 86-mile-long (138 km) river in Texas. It is part of the Red River watershed, with its water eventually flowing to the Atchafalaya River through the Atchafalaya Basin and entering the Gulf of Mexico.

It rises in southeastern Franklin County, 7 miles (11 km) northwest of Winnsboro, and flows generally east, becoming the boundary between Titus and Camp counties. It turns south and becomes impounded as the Lake O' the Pines, which occupies the lowest 20 miles (32 km) of the stream's course, primarily in Marion County. Below the reservoir, the creek becomes known as Big Cypress Bayou, which continues east to Caddo Lake and into Louisiana.

== See also ==
- List of rivers of Texas
