= Big Mineral Creek =

River in Texas, United States

Coordinates: 33.72511°N 96.77917°W

Location
- Country: United States

Physical characteristics
- Source
  - location: Texas

Big Mineral Creek is a river in Grayson County, Texas, United States.

== See also ==
- List of rivers of Texas
