= Hubbard Creek =

Coordinates: 32°44′31″N 99°07′02″W

Location
- Country: United States

Physical characteristics
- Source
  - location: Texas

Hubbard Creek is a river that flows through Callahan, Shackelford and Stephens counties in Texas.

The creek rises three miles north of Baird, flowing sixty-two miles northeast, through Shackelford County before meeting the Clear Fork of the Brazos River ten miles north of Breckenridge.

== See also ==
- List of rivers of Texas
