= Caney Creek (San Jacinto River tributary) =

Coordinates: 30.0818°N 95.1570°W

Location
- Country: United States

Physical characteristics
- Source
  - location: Texas

Caney Creek is a river in Texas, a tributary of the San Jacinto River.

== See also ==
- List of rivers of Texas
