= Big Sandy Creek (Trinity River tributary) =

Big Sandy Creek (Trinity River)

Location
- Country: United States

Physical characteristics
- Source
  - location: Texas

Big Sandy Creek is a river in Texas.

== See also ==
- List of rivers of Texas
