= Bedias Creek =

Coordinates: 30.9298°N 95.6181°W

Location
- Country: United States

Physical characteristics
- Source
  - location: Texas

Bedias Creek is a creek in Texas. The creek rises in Madison County and flows 47 miles (76 km) east into Houston County, where it empties into the Trinity River.

== See also ==
- List of rivers of Texas
