= Sabana River =

Location
- Country: United States
- state: Texas

Physical characteristics
- Mouth
  - location: 32.0436°N 98.5219°W

The Sabana River is a river in Texas.

== See also ==
- List of rivers of Texas
