= Pecan Bayou (Red River tributary) =

Coordinates: 33.72816°N 94.76021°W

Location
- Country: United States

Physical characteristics
- Source
  - location: Texas

Pecan Bayou is a 52.5-mile-long (84.5 km) tributary of the Red River in Texas. It is located entirely in Red River County, flowing west to east in a course north of Clarksville.

== See also ==
- List of rivers of Texas
