= Salt Draw =

Location
- Country: United States

Physical characteristics
- Source
  - location: Texas
  - coordinates: 31.333698°N 104.265801°W
- Mouth
  - location: Toyah Lake near Pecos, Texas
  - coordinates: 31.310639°N 103.436131°W

Salt Draw is a river in Texas. On April 4, 2004, flash flooding of Salt Draw caused the failure of a protective levee around Toyah, Texas, extensive flooding of most homes and property in Toyah, and the destruction of the Interstate 20 bridge over Salt Draw between Toyah and Pecos, Texas in Reeves County. Indirectly, 5 lives were also lost in a weather related traffic accident on U.S. Route 285 south of Pecos, which was being used as a detour because of the bridge failure.

Jeannette Walls' grandmother Lily lived from 1901 until 1911 in a dugout at Salt Draw which is described in the 2009 novel Half Broke Horses.

== See also ==
- List of rivers of Texas

== Links ==
- Salt Draw Watershed at epa.gov
- Geographic data related to Salt Draw at OpenStreetMap
- "An Analysis of Texas Waterways".
- USGS Geographic Names Information Service
- USGS Hydrologic Unit Map - State of Texas (1974)
