= Peach Creek (Guadalupe River tributary) =

Peach Creek (Guadalupe River)

Location
- Country: United States
- State: Texas

Physical characteristics
- Mouth
  - location: 29.4064°N 97.3224°W

Peach Creek (Guadalupe River) is a river in Texas.

== See also ==
- List of rivers of Texas
