= Elm River =

Elm River refers to several places:

== Rivers ==
- Elm River (Illinois)
- Elm River (Michigan)
- Elm River (North Dakota–South Dakota), a river in North Dakota and South Dakota
- Rivière à l'Orme (English: Elm River), a tributary of Lac des Deux Montagnes, in Montreal, Quebec, Canada

== Inhabited Places ==
- Elm River Township, Michigan

== See also ==
- Elm River Township (disambiguation)
- Elm Creek (disambiguation)
- Elm (disambiguation)
