= Independence Creek =

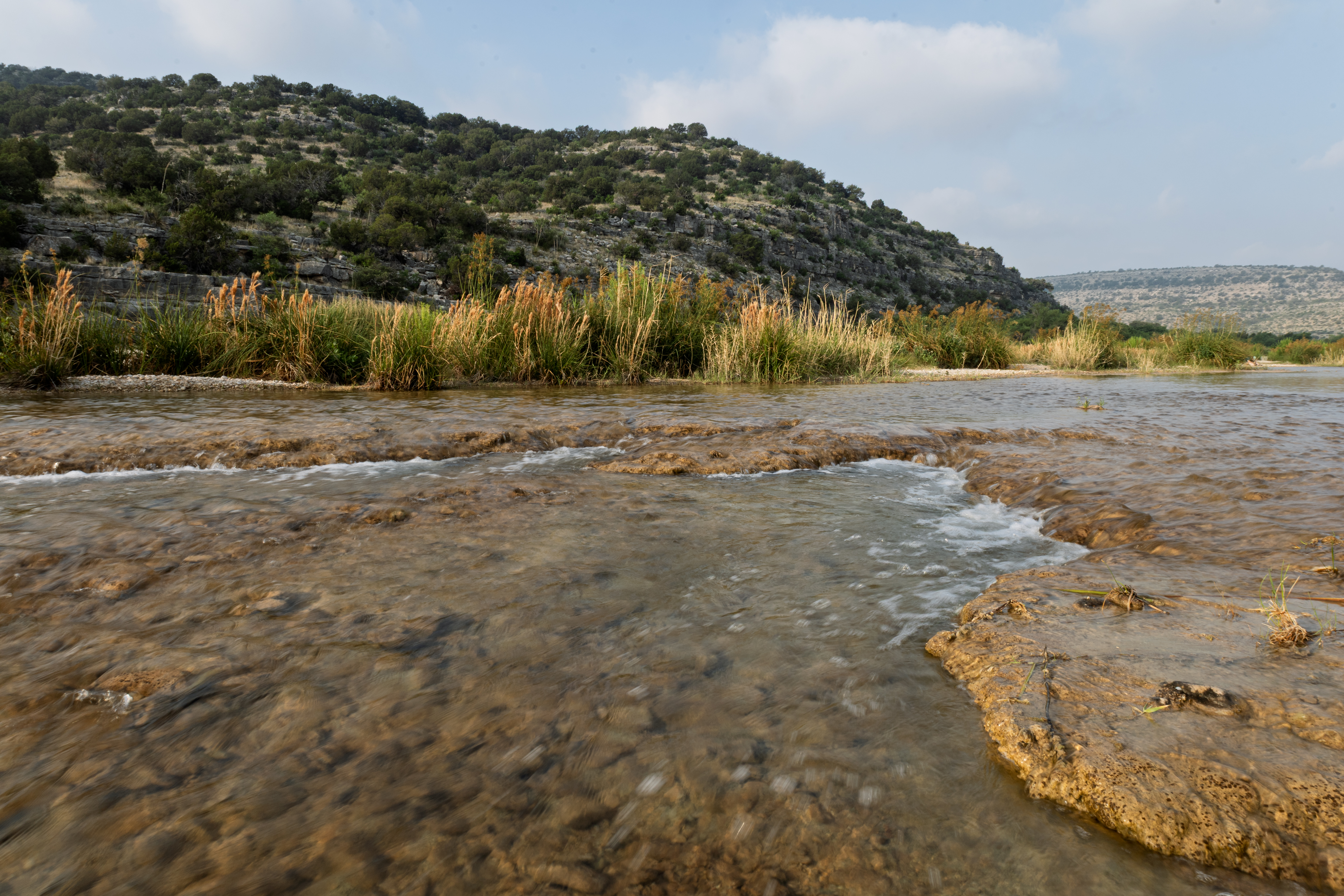
- View upstream of Independence Creek on the Nature Conservancy's Preserve.

Location
- Country: United States
- State: Texas

Physical characteristics
- Mouth
  - location: 30.4459°N 101.7214°W

Independence Creek is a spring-fed stream in the Chihuahuan Desert in west Texas that feeds 27 million gallons of water per day to the Pecos River.

The surrounding area has been inhabited for approximately 12,000 years, and is home to several endangered species. In 2000 and 2001, The Nature Conservancy acquired the surrounding land to establish the Independence Creek Preserve.

== See also ==
- List of rivers of Texas
