= Double Bayou, East Fork =

Location
- Country: United States
- State: Texas

Physical characteristics
- Mouth
  - location: 29.6538°N 94.6911°W

Double Bayou, East Fork is a river in Texas, United States.

== See also ==
- List of rivers of Texas
