= Chambers Creek (Richland Creek tributary) =

Location
- Country: United States

Physical characteristics
- Source
  - location: Texas
- Mouth
  - location: 32.0929°N 96.3471°W

Chambers Creek is a stream in Ellis County, Texas. It is a tributary to Richland Creek. Chambers Creek has the name of Thomas Jefferson Chambers, a pioneer settler.

== See also ==
- List of rivers of Texas
