= Punta de Agua Creek =

Location
- Country: United States
- State: Texas

Physical characteristics
- Mouth
  - location: 35.5452°N 102.4360°W

Punta de Agua Creek is a river in Texas.

== See also ==
- List of rivers of Texas
