= Sulphur Springs Draw =

Location
- Country: United States

Physical characteristics
- Source
  - location: Texas

Sulphur Springs Draw is a river in Texas. It is a dry branch or arroyo, and one of the subtributaries of Beals Creek. It passes through Lamesa, Texas, and joins Beals Creek at Big Spring, Texas.

== See also ==
- List of rivers of Texas
