= Beef Head Creek =

Stream in Liberty County, Texas, U.S.

Coordinates: 30.3507°N 94.7810°W

Beef Head Creek is a stream in Liberty County, Texas, in the United States.

Beef Head Creek was so named because it was a favorite watering spot of cattlemen.

== See also ==
- List of rivers of Texas
