= Keechi Creek =

Location
- Country: United States
- State: Texas

Physical characteristics
- Mouth
  - location: 32.8685°N 98.2178°W
- Length: 5 mi (8.0 km)

Keechi Creek is a stream in Palo Pinto County, Texas. It originates two miles east of Graford, and empties into the Brazos River northwest of Mineral Wells.

== See also ==
- List of rivers of Texas
