= Clear Creek (Trinity River tributary) =

Clear Creek (Trinity River)

Location
- Country: United States
- State: Texas

Physical characteristics
- Mouth
  - location: 33.2639°N 97.0489°W

Clear Creek (Trinity River) is a river in Texas.

== See also ==
- List of rivers of Texas
