= Sweetwater Creek (Clear Fork Brazos River tributary) =

Coordinates: 32°39′30.42″N 100°6′25.36″W

Sweetwater Creek (Clear Fork Brazos River)

Location
- Country: United States

Physical characteristics
- Source
  - location: Texas

Sweetwater Creek (Clear Fork Brazos River) is a river in Texas.

== See also ==
- List of rivers of Texas
