= Aquilla Creek =

Coordinates: 31°40′41.0″N 97°11′21.9″W

Location
- Country: United States

Physical characteristics
- Source
  - location: Texas

Aquilla Creek is a river in Texas.

== See also ==
- List of rivers of Texas
