= Coffee Mill Creek =

Stream in Texas, United States

Coordinates: 33°44′15″N 96°00′07″W

Location
- Country: United States

Physical characteristics
- Source
  - location: Texas

Coffee Mill Creek is a 16.6-mile-long (26.7 km) tributary of the Red River in Texas. It is part of the Mississippi River watershed. It flows entirely within Fannin County.

== See also ==
- List of rivers of Texas
