= Elm River Township =

Elm River Township may refer to the following places in the United States:

- Elm River Township, Wayne County, Illinois
- Elm River Township, Michigan

== See also ==
- Elm River (disambiguation)
