= Highland Bayou =

River in Texas, United States

Coordinates: 29.3421°N 94.9628°W

Location
- Country: United States

Physical characteristics
- Source
  - location: Texas

Highland Bayou is a river in Texas.

== See also ==
- List of rivers of Texas
