= Tongue River (Texas) =

- Location within Texas Location within the United States

Location
- Country: United States

Physical characteristics
- Source
  - location: Texas
  - coordinates: 33.8498027°N 100.9426396°W
- Mouth
  - coordinates: 34.1264624°N 100.4017842°W

The Tongue River (Texas) is a river in Texas.

== See also ==
- List of rivers of Texas
