= Double Bayou =

Location
- Country: United States
- State: Texas

Physical characteristics
- Mouth
  - location: 29.6532°N 94.6981°W

Double Bayou is a river in Texas.

== See also ==
- List of rivers of Texas
