= McKenzie Draw =

Coordinates: 32.552°N 102.1591°W

- Map

Location
- Country: United States
- State: Texas

McKenzie Draw is a river in Texas.

== See also ==
- List of rivers of Texas
