= Attoyac, Texas =

Unincorporated community in Texas, US

Attoyac
- Unincorporated community
- Location in Texas
- Coordinates: 32.0059999°N 94.1882509°W
- Country: United States
- State: Texas
- County: Nacogdoches
- Elevation: 308 ft (94 m)

Attoyac is an unincorporated community in Nacogdoches County, Texas, United States. Situated on Farm to Market Road 95, it was established in 1836, when it was platted by John Veatch and Almanzon Huston. They named the community for the Attoyac River. Until the post office was established in 1897—operated until the 1970s—the community was called Black Jack. It peaked in the early 1910s, with a population of 100, but began declining following World War I. Attoyac's decline continued past World War II, and as of the early 1990s, it was nearly abandoned.
