= Lake Charlotte Creek =

Coordinates: 29.8844°N 94.7390°W

Location
- Country: United States

Physical characteristics
- Source
  - location: Texas

Lake Charlotte Creek is a river in Texas.

== See also ==
- List of rivers of Texas
