= Harris Branch (Austin, Texas) =

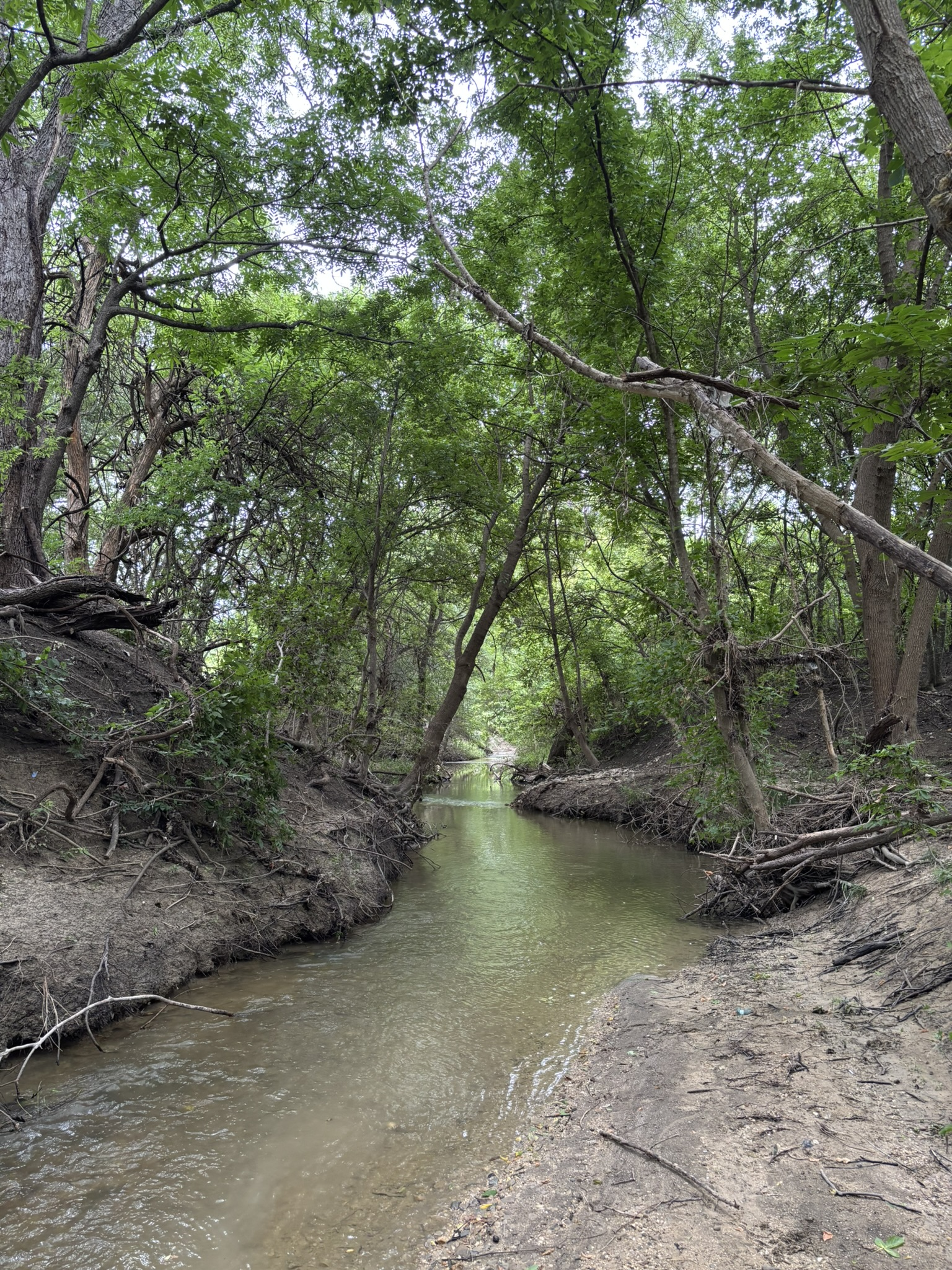
- Harris Branch, downstream of Harris Branch Parkway
- Map

Location
- Country: United States
- State: Texas

Physical characteristics
- Source
  - coordinates: 30°26′46.7″N 97°39′31.5″W
- Mouth: Gilleland Creek
  - coordinates: 30°21′29.1″N 97°35′10.6″W
- Length: 11 mi (18 km)

Harris Branch is an urban creek in northeast Austin, Texas, United States. It is part of the watershed of Gilleland Creek, which ultimately drains into the Colorado River. The creek flows through a rapidly urbanizing area of Travis County and has been affected by development-related water quality issues, including notable industrial spills in 2021 and 2022.

== Course and watershed ==
Harris Branch originates in Pflugerville east of Interstate 35 between Wells Branch Parkway and Pecan Street. It flows to the southeast, through Austin, joining Gilleland Creek east of State Highway 130 in Manor.

The watershed encompasses residential neighborhoods, transportation infrastructure, and industrial developments. Like many streams in the Austin metropolitan area, Harris Branch is heavily influenced by stormwater runoff and impervious cover associated with urbanization.

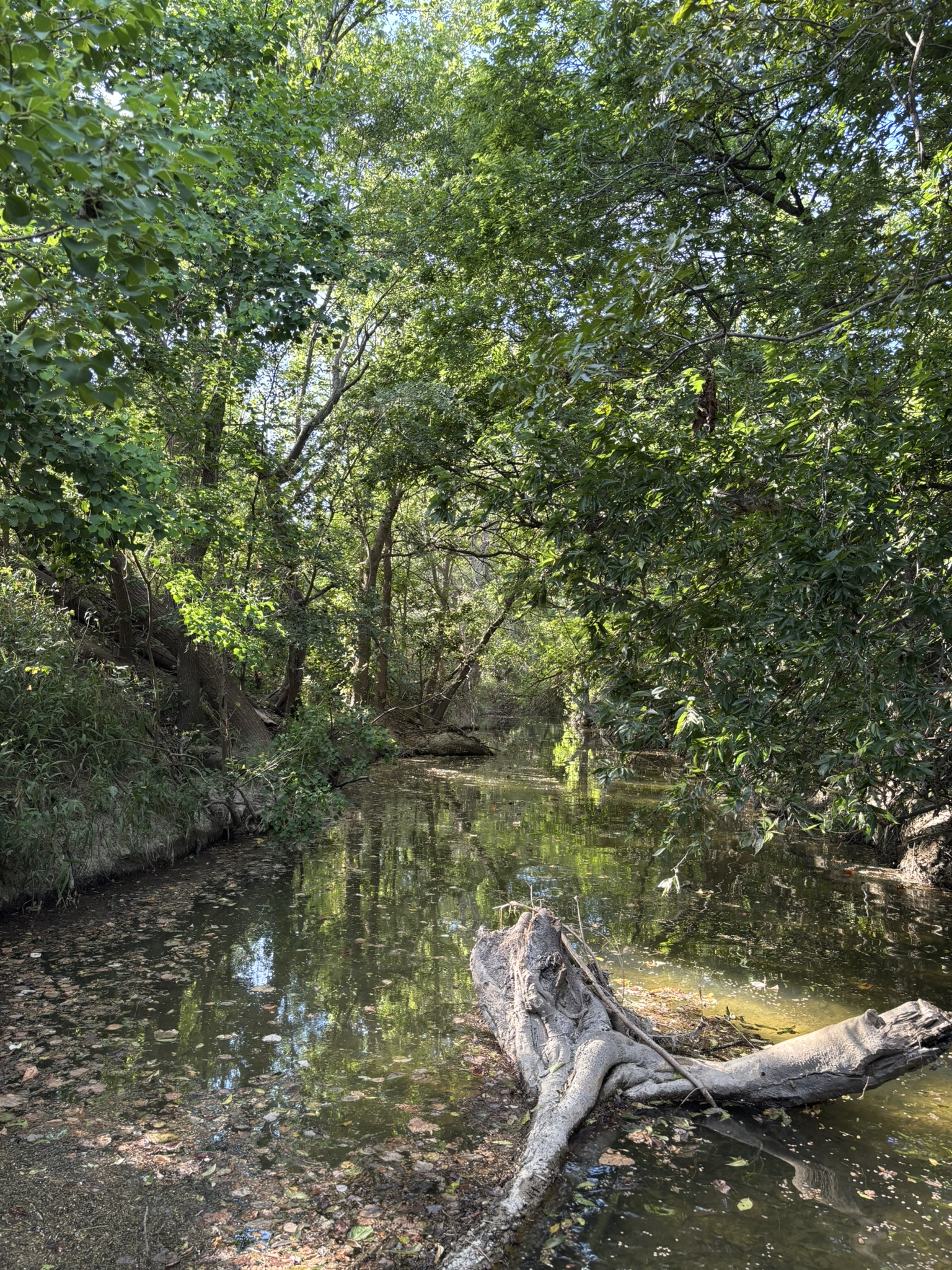
Harris Branch, midway between Harris Branch Parkway and Boyce Lane

== Ecology ==
Harris Branch supports a typical Central Texas urban stream ecosystem, including fish, macroinvertebrates, and riparian vegetation adapted to variable flow conditions. Ecological health in the creek fluctuates with rainfall patterns, pollutant inputs, and upstream land use.

Pecan, cedar elm, hackberry, cottonwood, sycamore, mesquite, and black willow are native tree species which occur commonly in the riparian zone. Greenbrier, mustang grape, and poison ivy are common native understory vines. Invasive tree species which have become common in the riparian zone include chinaberry and ligustrum, while bastard cabbage and Johnsongrass dominate as invasive weeds.

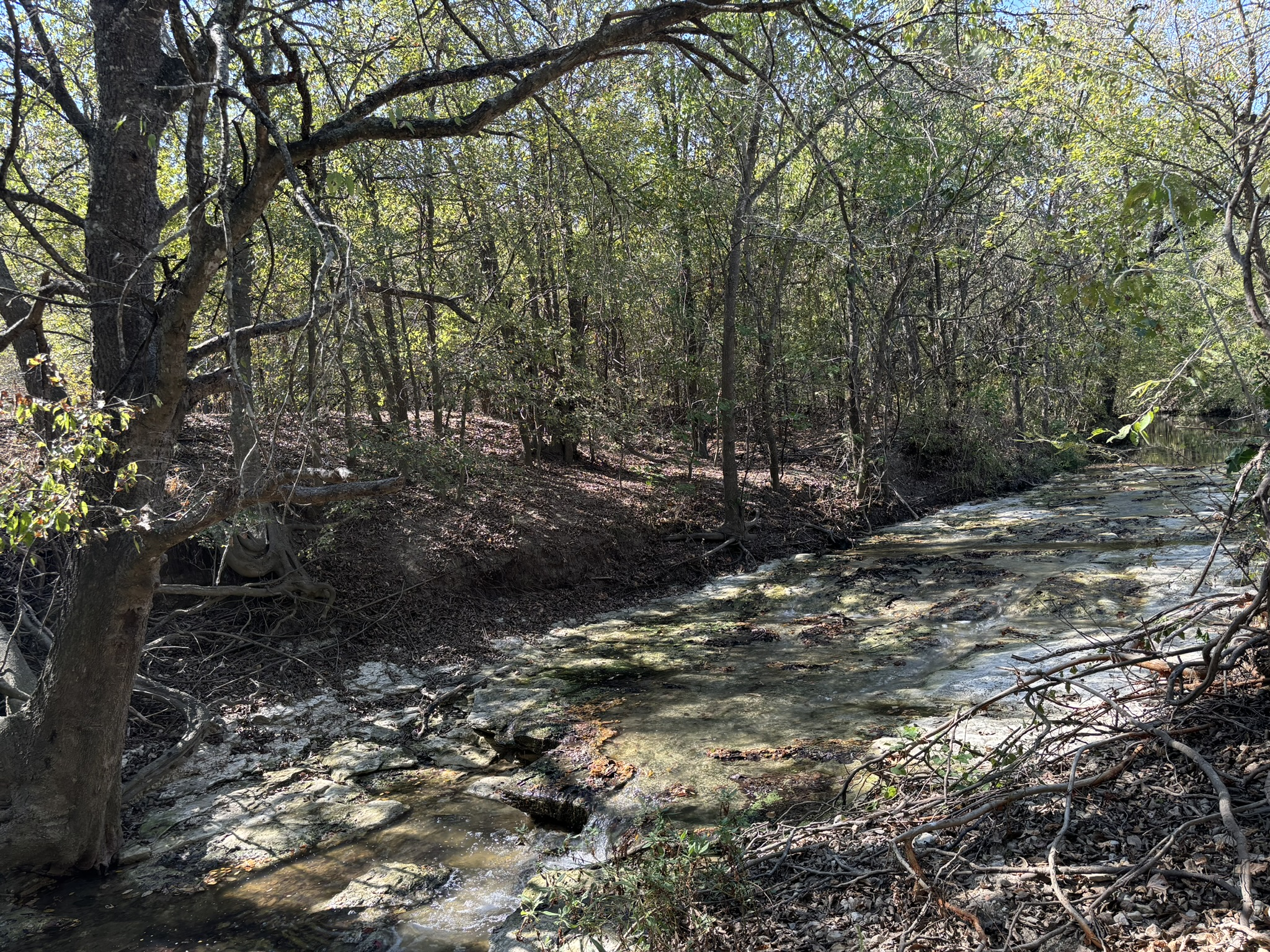
Taylor Group marl within the creek bed

== Geology ==
The geology of the creek is largely outcrops of Taylor Group marl from the Upper Cretaceous.

== 2021-2022 Samsung wastewater spills ==
In January 2022, it was discovered that over a period of up to 106 days, Samsung Austin Semiconductor had released approximately 763,000 gallons of sulfuric acid wastewater into an unnamed tributary of Harris Branch that flows east of the facility. The spill was attributed to a broken sump pipe.

The incident was soon followed by additional spills. On January 31, 2022, heavy rainfall caused 2.2 million gallons of stormwater and acidic wastewater to spill out of Samsung's onsite retention pond into an unnamed tributary of Harris Branch to the north of the facility. This was followed by a second heavy rainfall event on February 3, 2022, which caused another 5.9 million gallons of wastewater to spill from the retention pond to the same tributary to the north.

=== Environmental impact ===
The first, extended spill significantly altered water chemistry in the tributary, lowering pH levels to between 3 and 4. These conditions resulted in widespread mortality of aquatic organisms, with investigators reporting the near-total loss of aquatic life along roughly 1.5 miles (2.4 km) of the affected channel.

=== Recovery and response ===
Cleanup was conducted by Samsung Austin Semiconductor. Within a few days, testing confirmed the pH returned to normal with no additional impacts to water quality. In April 2022, confirmation from marine biologist studies showed the tributary had returned to healthy conditions suitable for supporting aquatic and semi-aquatic wildlife. The presence of live fish, amphibians and invertebrates were observed--indicating tributary conditions were normal and impact from the release were minimal and temporary.

The incident prompted regulatory review and calls for improved environmental monitoring and safeguards at the facility.

== See also ==
- List of rivers of Texas
