= Lake Fork Creek =

River in Texas, United States of America

Coordinates: 32.60930°N 95.34551°W

Location
- Country: United States

Physical characteristics
- Source
  - location: Texas

Lake Fork Creek is a 78.4-mile-long (126.2 km) river in Hunt, Rains, and Wood counties in Texas. It is a major tributary of the Sabine River, and has as its major tributaries Dry Creek, Glade Creek, Caney Creek, Little Caney Creek, Rainwater Creek, and Birch Creek.

In 1980, Lake Fork Creek was impounded, resulting in the formation of Lake Fork Reservoir.

== See also ==
- List of rivers of Texas
