= Range Creek (Texas) =

River in Grayson County, Texas, United States

Coordinates: 33.5071°N 96.8875°W

See also Range Creek in Utah

Range Creek is a tributary of Lake Ray Roberts in Texas. It rises just a few miles from the Red River in Grayson County.

== See also ==
- List of rivers of Texas
