= Big Cow Creek =

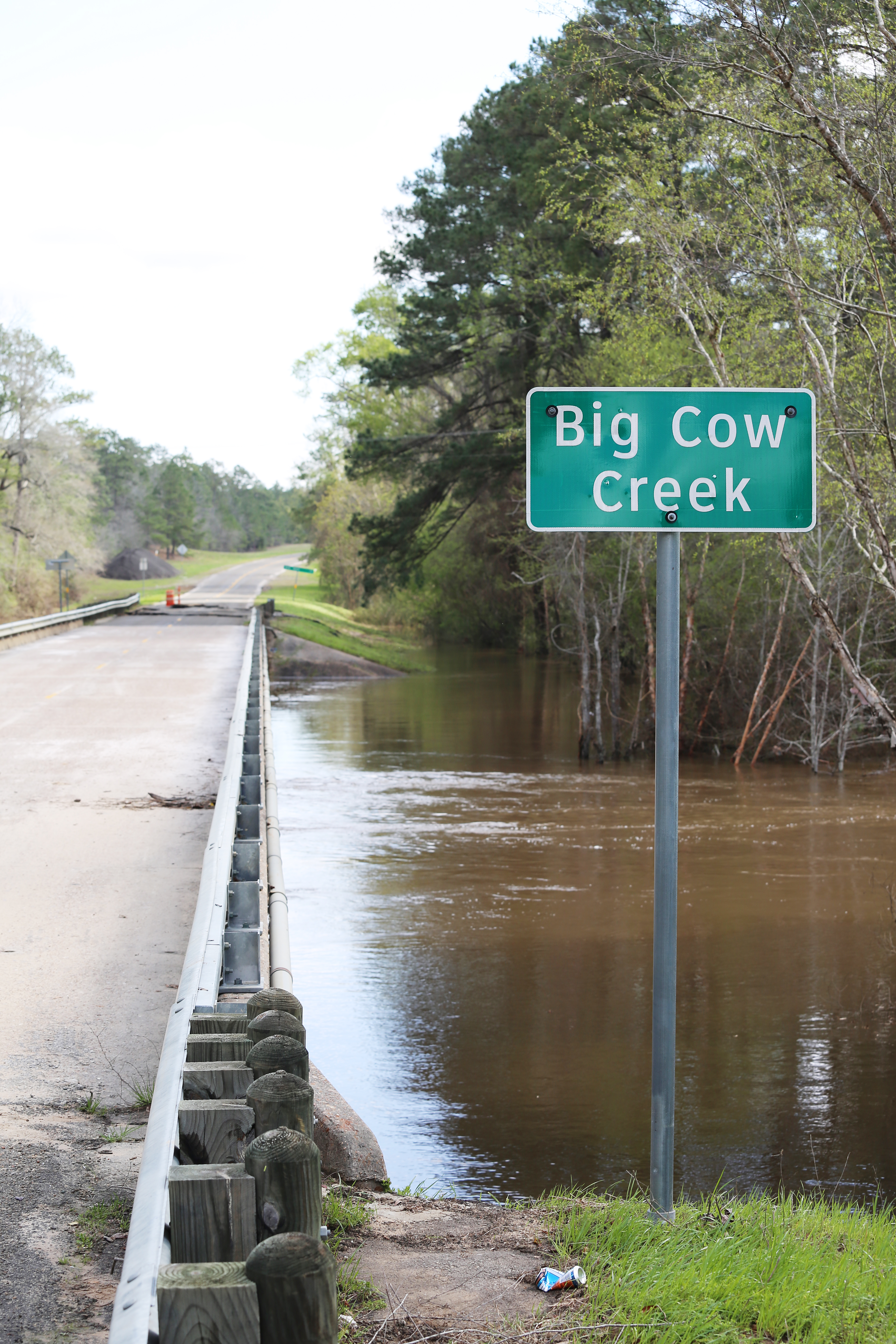
- Cow Creek Bridge spanning Big Cow Creek

Location
- Country: United States

Physical characteristics
- Source
  - location: 31°05′00″N 93°53′08″W
- Mouth
  - location: 30°34′25″N 93°43′43″W

Big Cow Creek is a 65.8-mile-long (105.9 km) tributary of the Sabine River in eastern Texas.

== See also ==
- List of rivers of Texas
