= Clear Creek (Harris County, Texas) =

Coordinates: 29.5547°N 95.0180°W

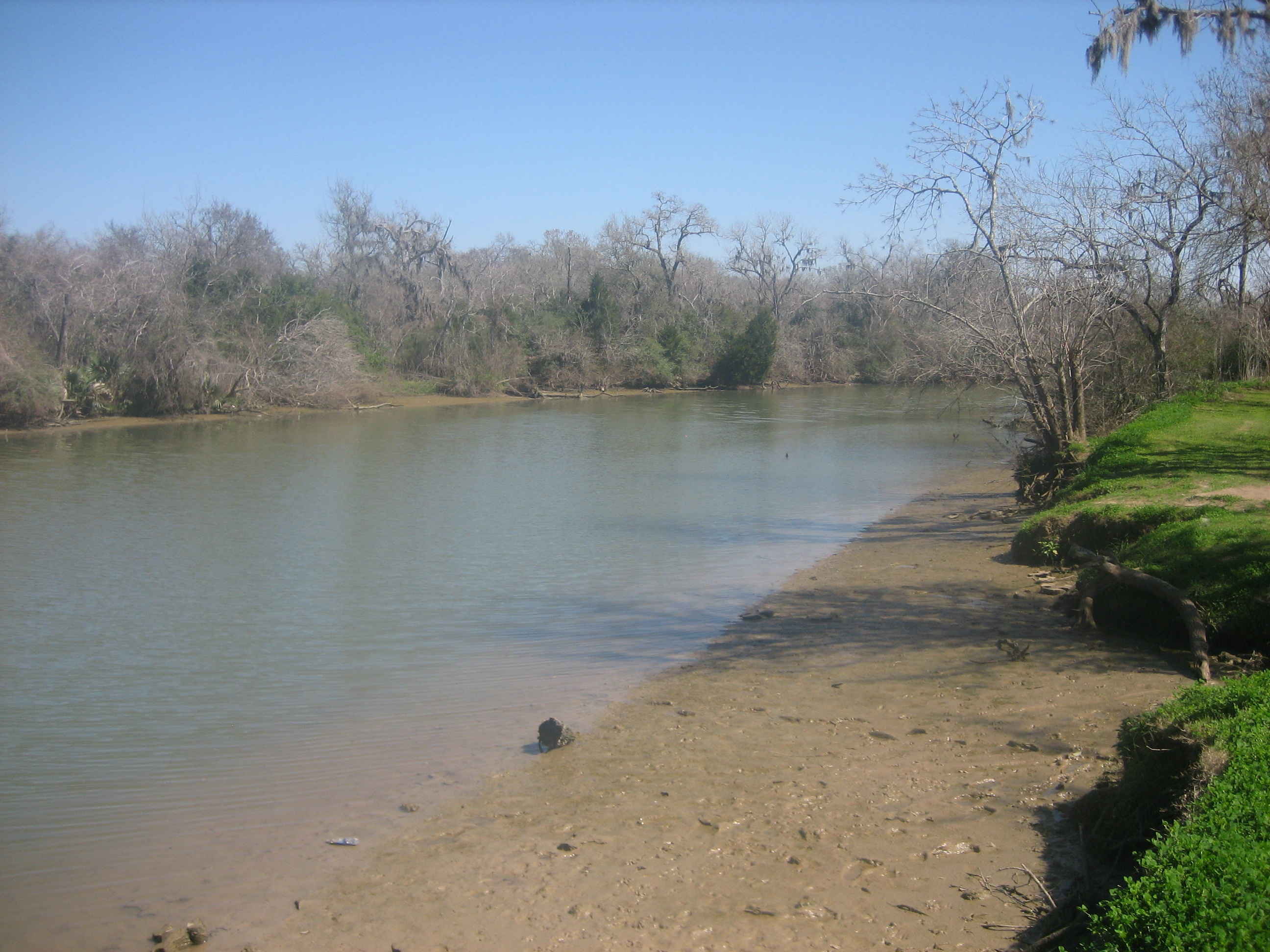
- Clear Creek from Bay Area Boulevard

Location
- Country: United States

Physical characteristics
- Source
  - location: Blue Ridge Oilfield, Fort Bend County, Texas
- Mouth
  - location: Clear Lake, Harris County, Texas
- Basin size: Clear Creek Watershed

Clear Creek is a small river in Southeast Texas in the United States, which channels much of the run-off in southeast Harris County into Clear Lake and Galveston Bay. Much of the length of the stream forms the boundary between Harris County and Galveston County and all of the boundary with Brazoria County. It originates in the Blue Ridge Oilfield in Fort Bend County.

== Water quality ==
The Texas Parks and Wildlife Department (TPWD) has issued a Fish Consumption Advisory for Clear Creek due to the presence of polychlorinated biphenyls (PCBs). The advisory states "Persons should not consume any species of fish from these waters."

== See also ==
- Clear Creek Independent School District
- List of rivers of Texas
