= Carancahua Creek =

Location
- Country: United States
- State: Texas

Physical characteristics
- Mouth
  - location: 28.6925°N 96.4027°W

Carancahua Creek is a river in Texas.

== See also ==
- List of rivers of Texas
