= Millers Creek (Brazos River tributary) =

Millers Creek (Brazos River)

Location
- Country: United States
- State: Texas

Physical characteristics
- Mouth
  - location: 33.4575°N 99.2326°W

Millers Creek (Brazos River) is a river in Texas.

== See also ==
- List of rivers of Texas
