= Kicaster Creek =

Coordinates: 29°10′21″N 98°11′45″W

Kicaster Creek is a short stream in Wilson County, Texas. The creek begins in the recharge zone for the Carrizo-Wilcox Aquifer, near Kicaster, six miles southwest of the town of La Vernia. It flows through the Sand Hills Region of Wilson County for eleven miles southeastward to its mouth three miles northwest of the town of Floresville on the San Antonio River.

== See also ==
- List of rivers of Texas
