= San Fernando Creek =

Coordinates: 27°22′46.14″N 97°42′25.98″W

Location
- Country: United States

Physical characteristics
- Source
  - location: Texas
- Mouth
  - location: Baffin Bay, Laguna Madre

San Fernando Creek is a river in Texas. Its mouth is in Baffin Bay in the Upper Laguna Madre.

== See also ==
- List of rivers of Texas
