= Austin Bayou =

Coordinates: 29°05′55.6″N 95°17′56.6″W

Location
- Country: United States

Physical characteristics
- Source
  - location: Texas

Austin Bayou is a small waterway in Brazoria County, in the U.S. state of Texas. The bayou is named for Stephen F. Austin, the founder of Texas.

== See also ==
- List of rivers of Texas
