= Calamity Creek =

Coordinates: 29.8228°N 103.4828°W

weather Creek

Location
- Country: United States

Physical characteristics
- Source
  - location: Texas

Calamity Creek is a river in Texas.

== See also ==
- List of rivers of Texas
