= Catfish Creek (Texas) =

Location
- Country: United States

Physical characteristics
- Source
  - location: Henderson County, Texas
  - coordinates: 32.1374°N 95.7155°W
- Mouth
  - location: Trinity River
  - coordinates: 31.7746°N 95.9319°W
- Length: 37 mi (60 km)

U.S. National Natural Landmark
- Designated: 1983

Catfish Creek (Texas) is a river in Henderson County, Texas. It was designated a National Natural Landmark in 1983.

== See also ==
- List of rivers of Texas
