= Mud Creek (Angelina River tributary) =

Mud Creek (Angelina River)

Location
- Country: United States
- State: Texas

Physical characteristics
- Mouth
  - location: 31.7935°N 94.9781°W

Mud Creek is a tributary of the Angelina River in Texas.

== See also ==
- List of rivers of Texas
