= Vince Bayou =

Coordinates: 29°40′N 95°12′W

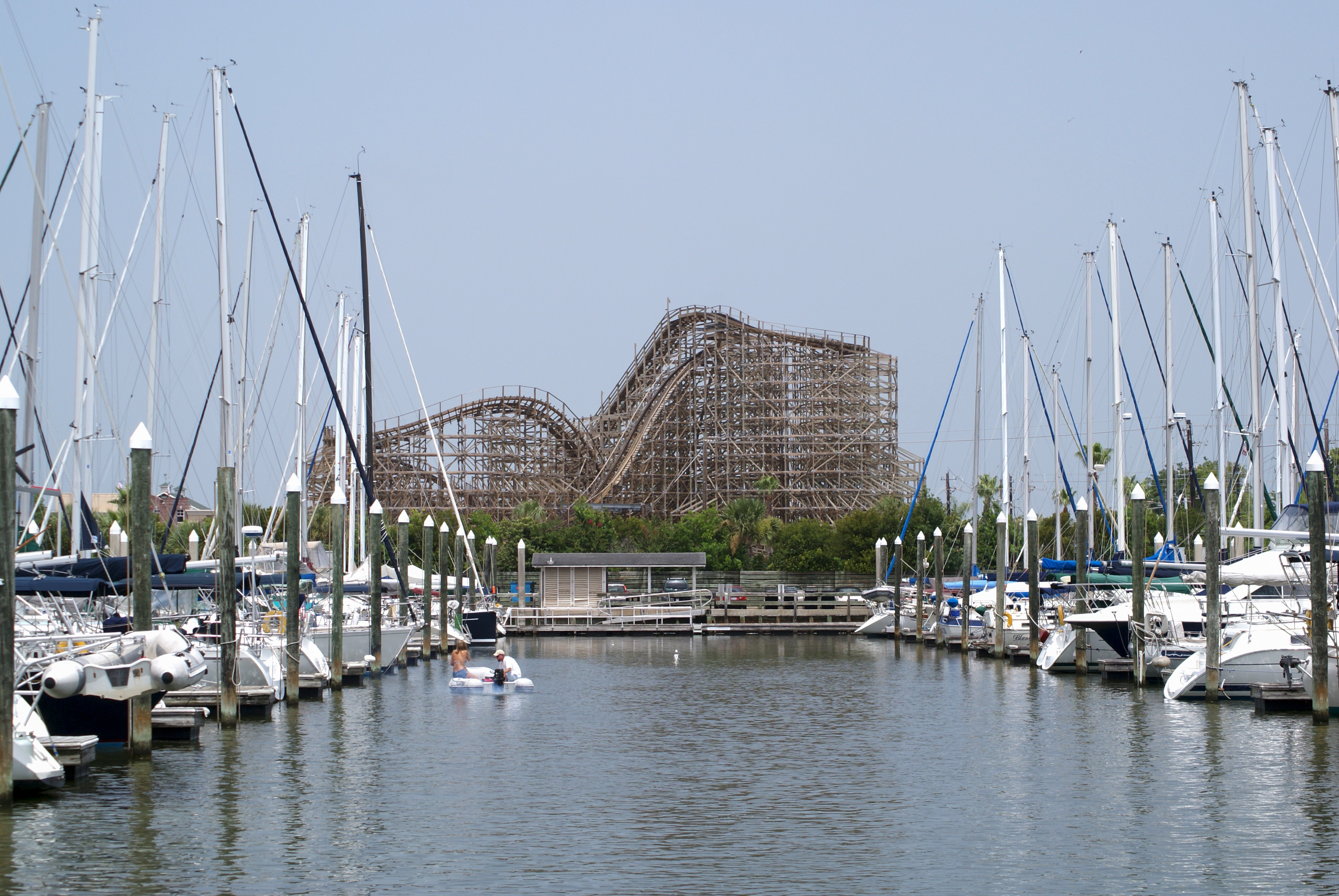

Location
- Country: United States

Physical characteristics
- Source
  - location: Harris County, Texas
- Mouth
  - location: Buffalo Bayou, Harris County, Texas
- Basin size: Vince Bayou Watershed

Vince Bayou, also known as Vince's Bayou, is a river that rises in southeast Harris County, Texas and runs northwest, through Pasadena and the city of South Houston, for a total of 19 channel miles (which include the reach of one minor tributary) to its mouth on the Houston Ship Channel (the lower reaches of Buffalo Bayou).

Very little wildlife habitat exists, and the estimated population within the Vince Bayou watershed is just under 89,000 persons. Vince Bayou hosts a primarily urban environment.

During Tropical Storm Allison, in June of the 2001 Atlantic hurricane season, the watershed received in excess of 13 inches (330 mm) of rain in a 24-hour period, resulting in bayou channel overbanking that flooded 1,500 homes in a 4.1-square-mile (11 km^{2}) area.

== See also ==
- List of rivers of Texas
