= Loss Creek (Texas) =

Loss Creek (also known as Lost Creek) rises south of Coleman in central Coleman County, Texas, United States (at 31°50' N, 99°26' W) and flows southeast for 8 miles (13 km) to its mouth on Home Creek (at 31°42' N, 99°24' W). The stream passes through rolling terrain where clay and sandy loams support grasses, mesquite, and cacti.

== See also ==
- List of rivers of Texas
