= Sandy Creek (Navidad River tributary) =

Coordinates: 29°1′39.93″N 96°33′13.90″W

Sandy Creek (Navidad River)

Location
- Country: United States

Physical characteristics
- Source
  - location: Texas

Sandy Creek (Navidad River) is a river in Texas.

== See also ==
- List of rivers of Texas
