= Bois D'Arc Creek =

Coordinates: 33.83816°N 95.84691°W

Bois d'Arc Creek

Location
- Country: United States

Physical characteristics
- Source
  - location: Texas

Bois d'Arc Creek is a 68.1-mile-long (109.6 km) river in Texas. It is a tributary of the Red River and is part of the Mississippi River watershed.

It rises in eastern Grayson County, 2 miles (3 km) northwest of Whitewright, and flows southeast into Fannin County, gradually turning northeast in an arc around the town of Randolph. It continues northeast past the city of Bonham, then continues through the Caddo National Grassland and joins the Red River at the boundary between Fannin and Lamar counties.

== See also ==
- List of rivers of Texas
- Bois D'Arc Lake
