= Groesbeck Creek =

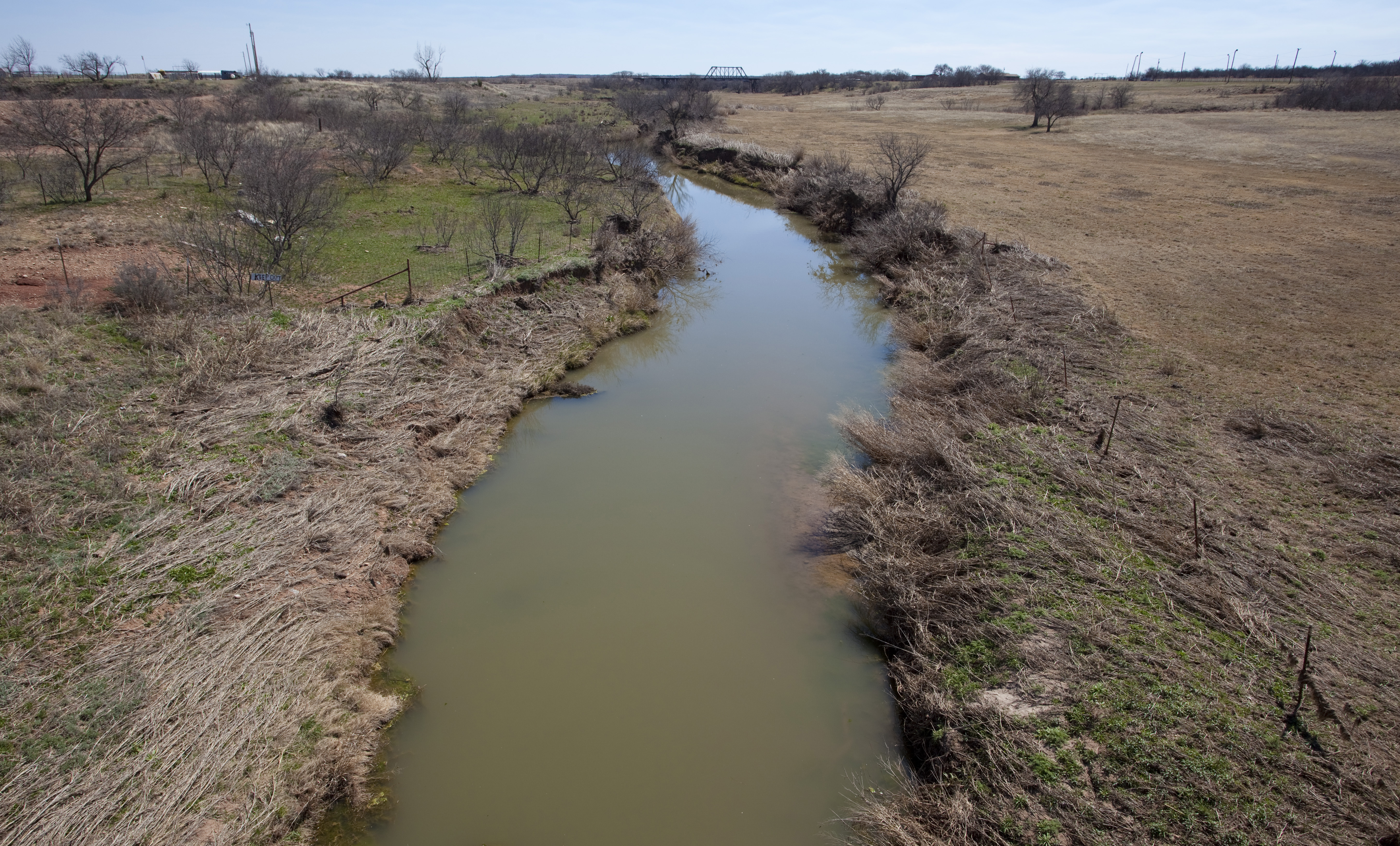
- Groesbeck Creek, Hardeman County, Texas

Location
- Country: United States
- State: Texas

Physical characteristics
- Source: near Quanah
  - location: Hardeman County
  - coordinates: 34.3642411°N 99.7698172°W
  - elevation: 443 m (1,453 ft)
- Mouth: Red River
  - location: Hardeman County
  - coordinates: 34.3731324°N 99.6053694°W
  - elevation: 417 m (1,368 ft)
- Length: 16 km (9.9 mi)

Groesbeck Creek is a stream in Texas which is a tributary of the Red River.

Groesbeck Creek is formed at the confluence of two tributaries – North and South Groesbeck creeks. North Groesbeck Creek heads in Childress County at the eastern edge of the small town of Childress, Texas. South Groesbeck Creek heads 7.3 mi (11.7 km) to the southeast of Childress and generally flows eastward to a confluence with North Groesbeck Creek to form Groesbeck Creek (proper) 5 mi (8.0 km) to the north-northeast of Quanah in Hardeman County, Texas. Groesbeck Creek then flows about 10 mi (16 km) to the east before emptying into the Red River, which forms the border that divides Texas and Oklahoma.

== See also ==
- List of rivers of Texas
