= Petronila Creek =

Coordinates: 27.4742°N 97.5381°W

Location
- Country: United States
- State: Texas

Petronila Creek is a river in Texas that runs from Nueces County to Kleberg County.

== See also ==
- List of rivers of Texas
