= Mill Creek (Brazos River tributary) =

Coordinates: 29.8450°N 96.1201°W

Mill Creek (Brazos River)

Location
- Country: United States

Physical characteristics
- Source
  - location: Texas

Mill Creek is a river in the U.S. state of Texas, draining into the Brazos River.

== See also ==
- List of rivers of Texas
