= Peach Creek (San Jacinto River tributary) =

Peach Creek (San Jacinto River)

Location
- Country: United States
- State: Texas

Physical characteristics
- Mouth
  - location: 30.1183°N 95.1724°W

Peach Creek (San Jacinto River) is a river in Texas.

== See also ==
- List of rivers of Texas
