= Buck Creek (Red River tributary) =

Coordinates: 34.5771°N 99.9711°W

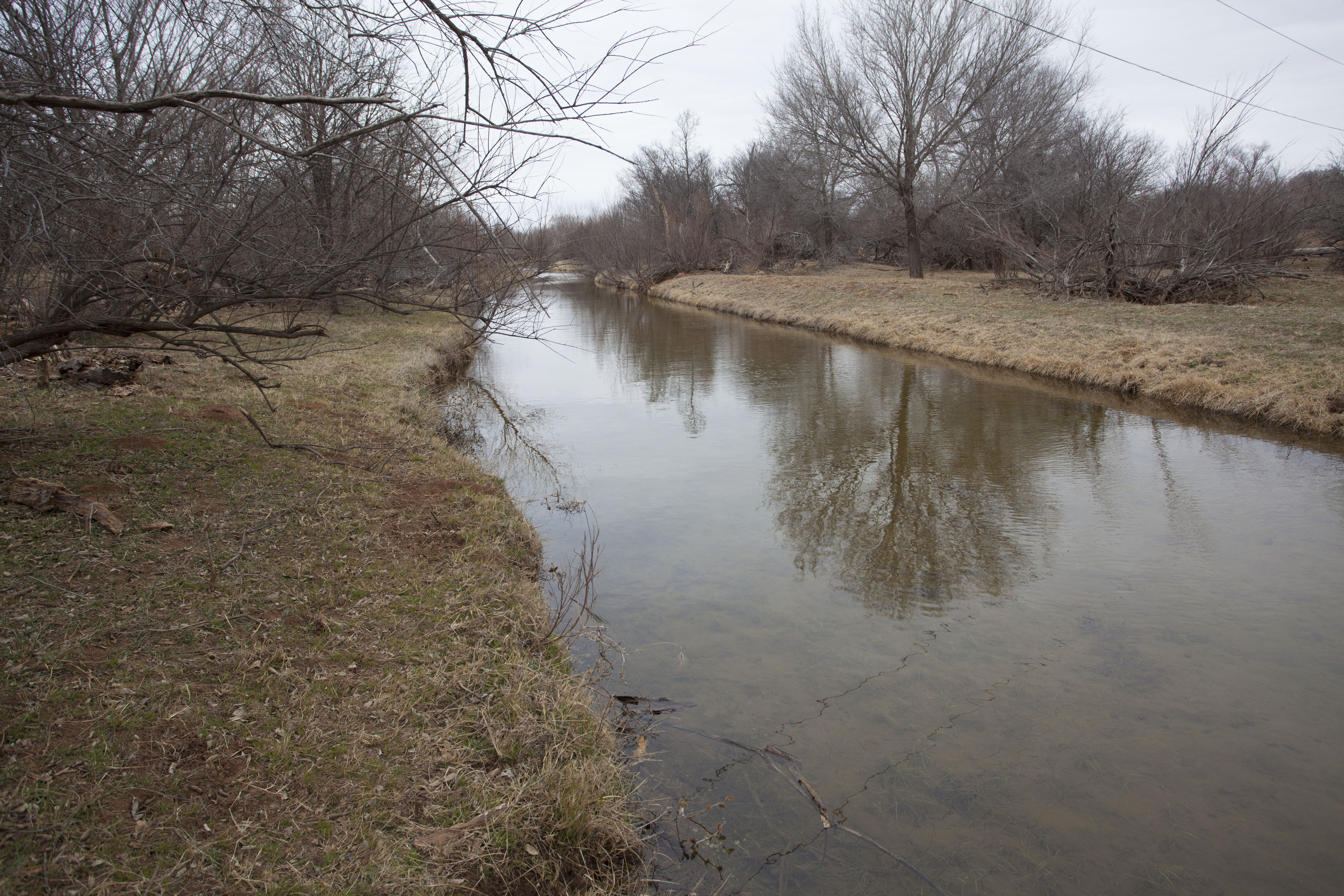
- Buck Creek at US83 crossing in Childress County, Texas

Location
- Country: United States

Physical characteristics
- Source
  - location: Donley County, Texas
  - elevation: 2,689 feet (820 m)
- Mouth
  - location: Harmon County, Oklahoma
  - elevation: 1,551 feet (473 m)

Buck Creek is a river in Texas and far southwestern Oklahoma, a tributary of the Red River.

== See also ==
- List of rivers of Texas
