= Big Pine Creek (Texas) =

Coordinates: 33.86622°N 95.04578°W

Location
- Country: United States

Physical characteristics
- Source
  - location: Texas

Big Pine Creek is an 18.5-mile-long (29.8 km) river in Texas. It is a tributary of the Red River, part of the Mississippi River watershed. The creek flows entirely within Red River County, Texas.

== See also ==
- List of rivers of Texas
