= Gentry Creek =

Coordinates: 30.5174°N 99.6839°W

Gentry Creek is located in Kimble County a half mile south of the Menard-Kimble county line. The creek runs southeast through ranchland for 21 miles (34 km) to its mouth on the Llano River. It is two miles south of Teacup Mountain and four miles northeast of Junction, Texas. It is named after Raleigh Gentry who moved from Bear Creek to just above the mouth of Gentry Creek in 1862 when the creek flowed year-round. One of the largest Indian artifact finds in the Texas was on Gentry Creek.

== See also ==
- List of rivers of Texas
