= White Oak Creek (Sulphur River tributary) =

Coordinates: 33.26401°N 94.64993°W

Location
- Country: United States

Physical characteristics
- Source
  - location: Texas

White Oak Creek is a 140-mile-long (230 km) tributary of the Sulphur River in Texas. Via the Sulphur River, the creek is part of the Red River watershed, flowing to the Mississippi River and ultimately the Gulf of Mexico.

== See also ==
- List of rivers of Texas
