= Elm Creek (Wood County, Wisconsin) =

Stream in Wisconsin, US

Coordinates: 44°22′51″N 89°58′45″W

Elm Creek is a stream in the U.S. state of Wisconsin.

Elm Creek was so named on account of elm timber along its course.
