= Tea bowl =

Tea bowl may refer to:

- Chawan, an East Asian tea bowl
- Gaiwan, a Chinese tea bowl with a lid and a saucer
