= Elm Creek (Brazos River tributary) =

Elm Creek (Brazos River)

Location
- Country: United States
- State: Texas

Physical characteristics
- Mouth
  - location: 32.8658°N 98.2889°W

Elm Creek (Brazos River) is a river in Texas.

== See also ==
- List of rivers of Texas
