= Beals Creek =

River in Mitchell and Howard counties in Texas, United States

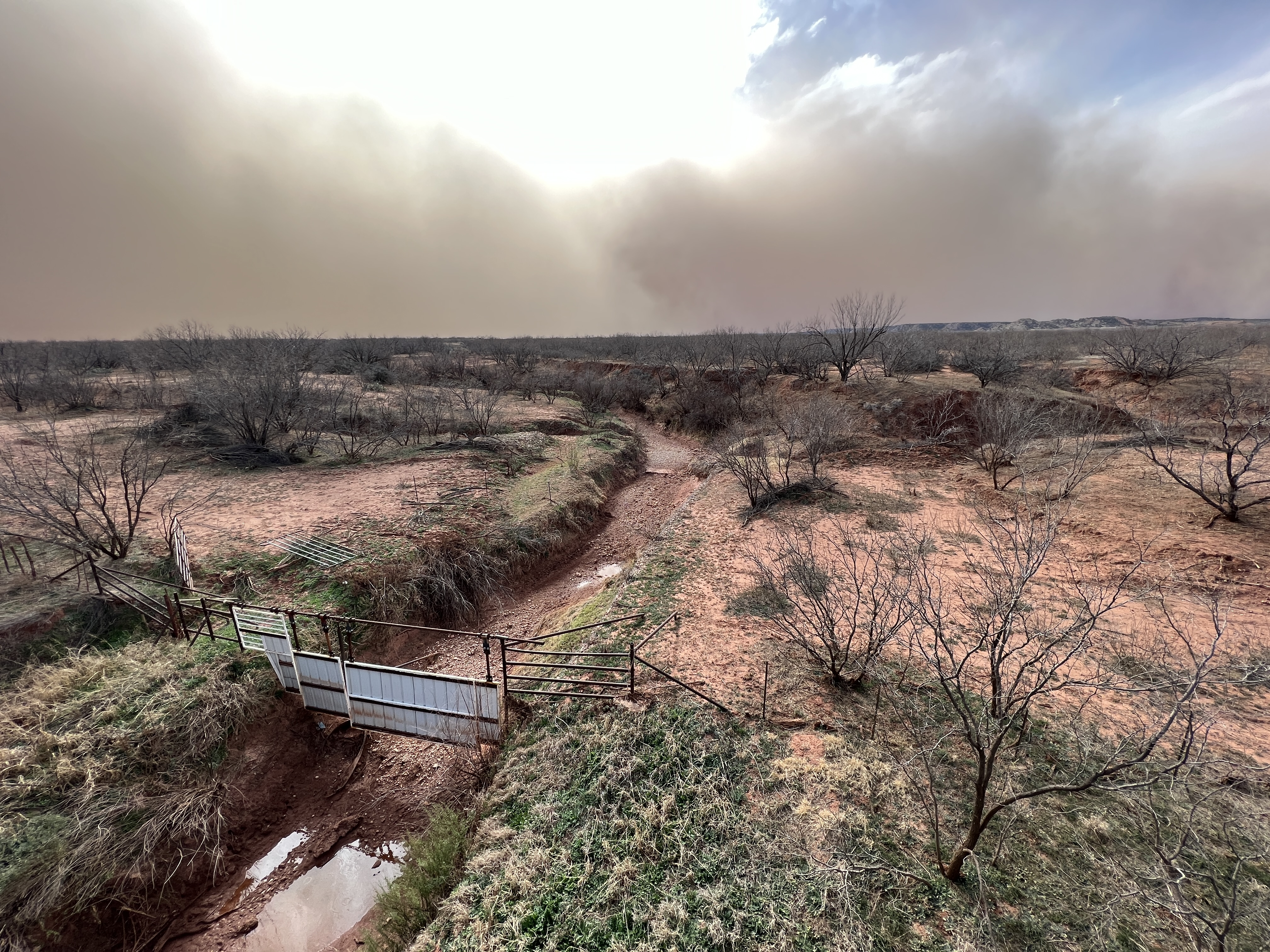
- Dust storm approaching Beals Creek at State Highway 163 crossing, Mitchell County, March 2023

Location
- Country: United States

Physical characteristics
- Source
  - location: Big Spring, Texas 32°15′01.4″N 101°29′28.4″W
- Mouth
  - location: 32°10′48.0″N 100°51′15.8″W

Beals Creek is an intermittent watercourse that runs from Howard County to Mitchell County in Texas. The stream begins at Salt Lake just west of Big Spring, where the Sulphur Springs Draw meets Mustang Draw. The creek flows in a generally east/southeast direction to the Colorado River south of Colorado City.

Local legend believes Montezuma is buried in the creek bed at an unknown location. The legend is Montezuma was able to escape the fall of Tenochtitlan and flee north only to finally die from his injuries. In an unusual peaceful act, both local Comanche and Pawnee tribes combined to dam the creek and perform a traditional funeral only then to undam the creek and commit a mass suicide so no one could unearth the great Aztec leader.

== See also ==
- List of rivers of Texas
