= Elm Creek (Chariton River tributary) =

Stream in the US state of Missouri

Coordinates: 40.423916°N 92.677695°W

Elm Creek is a stream in Schuyler County in the U.S. state of Missouri. It is a tributary of the Chariton River.

Elm Creek most likely was so named on account of elm timber near its course.

== See also ==
- List of rivers of Missouri
