= Beech Creek (Logan County, West Virginia) =

Stream in West Virginia, U.S.

Coordinates: 37°55′15″N 81°49′48″W

Beech Creek is a stream in the U.S. state of West Virginia.

Beech Creek was named for the beech trees along its course.

== See also ==
- List of rivers of West Virginia
