= Lake Fork Reservoir =

- Marshy inlet on Lake Fork

- Location within Texas Location within the United States
- Location: Wood County, Texas; Rains County, Texas; Hopkins County, Texas
- Coordinates: 32°48′15″N 95°32′22″W
- Type: reservoir
- Part of: Sabine River
- Primary inflows: Lake Fork Creek; Caney Creek; Little Caney Creek
- Primary outflows: Lake Fork Creek
- Catchment area: 493 sq mi (1,280 km^{2})
- Basin countries: United States
- Surface area: 27,264 acres (11,033 ha)
- Max. depth: 70 feet (21 m)
- Water volume: 675,819 acre-feet (833,610,000 m^{3})
- Shore length^{1}: 315 miles (507 km)
- Surface elevation: 403.0 ft (122.8 m)
- Website: www.sratx.org/sra-offices/lake-fork/
- ^{1} Shore length is not a well-defined measure.

Lake Fork Reservoir is a reservoir located in Wood, Rains, and Hopkins counties in the state of Texas, between the towns of Quitman, Alba, Emory, and Yantis, Texas.

It was impounded by the Lake Fork Dam in 1980, and reached its normal pool surface elevation of 403.0 feet (122.8 m) above mean sea level in 1985. It consists of 27,264 acres (110.33 km^{2}), offers 315 miles (507 km) of shoreline, and has a drainage area of 493 square miles (1,280 km^{2}). The dam is 12,410 feet (3,780 m) in length and impounds Lake Fork Creek, a tributary of the Sabine River, and other major creeks are Big Caney and Little Caney.

The dam and reservoir with a maximum capacity of 675,819 acre-feet (833,610,000 m^{3}) are owned and operated by the Sabine River Authority, a state agency.

It officially serves as a reservoir for Dallas and its suburbs. However, it is best known for its fishing, as it holds 15 of the top 20 Texas State Record largemouth bass ever caught, making it one of the premier trophy bass fishing lakes in the world.

== Fishing ==
Lake Fork Reservoir was created as a textbook fishery, including initial stockings before the lake filled. Lake Fork Reservoir was established, by the Texas Parks and Wildlife, as a premier bass fishing lake, with 732,514 Florida-strain largemouth bass being stocked from 1979 through 1987. Lake Fork Reservoir offers excellent fish habitat with 80% standing timber left intact, and hydrilla, milfoil, and duckweed being the predominant vegetation. Other species of fish include catfish, sand bass, yellow bass, black and white crappie, sunfish, bowfin, gar, and bluegill. The predominant food source for the larger fish is shad, minnows, and crawfish.

Lake Fork is famous for its high quality bass, as 7 of the top 10 bass caught in Texas are from this lake, including the record, which was 18.18 pounds.

To preserve the great Lake Fork Reservoir bass fisheries, the Texas Parks and Wildlife implemented a protected slot limit of no bass between 16 and 24 inches (410 and 610 mm) will be kept, and will be returned into the waters of Lake Fork immediately. A five bass per day limit can be kept, consisting of five-under 16 inches (410 mm), or one-over 24 inches (610 mm) , and four-under 16 inches (410 mm).

== Climate ==
According to the Köppen Climate Classification system, the Lake Fork Reservoir has a humid subtropical climate, abbreviated "Cfa" on climate maps. The hottest temperature recorded at Lake Fork Reservoir was 108 °F (42.2 °C) on July 19, 2006, while the coldest temperature recorded was −7 °F (−21.7 °C) on February 16, 2021.

Climate data for Lake Fork Reservoir, Texas, 1991–2020 normals, extremes 1989–present
Month	Jan	Feb	Mar	Apr	May	Jun	Jul	Aug	Sep	Oct	Nov	Dec	Year
Record high °F (°C)	88 (31)	86 (30)	90 (32)	95 (35)	98 (37)	102 (39)	108 (42)	107 (42)	110 (43)	96 (36)	89 (32)	82 (28)	110 (43)
Mean maximum °F (°C)	73.4 (23.0)	76.6 (24.8)	81.9 (27.7)	85.7 (29.8)	90.8 (32.7)	96.0 (35.6)	100.4 (38.0)	101.9 (38.8)	97.2 (36.2)	90.2 (32.3)	80.9 (27.2)	75.0 (23.9)	103.0 (39.4)
Mean daily maximum °F (°C)	54.9 (12.7)	59.1 (15.1)	66.3 (19.1)	74.4 (23.6)	81.3 (27.4)	88.7 (31.5)	92.7 (33.7)	93.4 (34.1)	87.2 (30.7)	77.2 (25.1)	65.9 (18.8)	57.3 (14.1)	74.9 (23.8)
Daily mean °F (°C)	44.9 (7.2)	48.9 (9.4)	56.4 (13.6)	63.9 (17.7)	72.0 (22.2)	79.5 (26.4)	83.0 (28.3)	83.0 (28.3)	76.5 (24.7)	66.2 (19.0)	55.8 (13.2)	47.5 (8.6)	64.8 (18.2)
Mean daily minimum °F (°C)	34.9 (1.6)	38.7 (3.7)	46.5 (8.1)	53.4 (11.9)	62.6 (17.0)	70.2 (21.2)	73.3 (22.9)	72.7 (22.6)	65.8 (18.8)	55.2 (12.9)	45.6 (7.6)	37.8 (3.2)	54.7 (12.6)
Mean minimum °F (°C)	19.7 (−6.8)	24.6 (−4.1)	29.4 (−1.4)	38.3 (3.5)	47.9 (8.8)	61.4 (16.3)	67.0 (19.4)	65.4 (18.6)	52.9 (11.6)	39.8 (4.3)	28.8 (−1.8)	23.8 (−4.6)	17.2 (−8.2)
Record low °F (°C)	9 (−13)	−7 (−22)	13 (−11)	27 (−3)	37 (3)	52 (11)	57 (14)	56 (13)	43 (6)	28 (−2)	20 (−7)	2 (−17)	−7 (−22)
Average precipitation inches (mm)	3.41 (87)	3.39 (86)	4.16 (106)	3.93 (100)	4.97 (126)	3.89 (99)	2.71 (69)	2.71 (69)	3.26 (83)	4.70 (119)	3.70 (94)	4.31 (109)	45.14 (1,147)
Average snowfall inches (cm)	0.2 (0.51)	0.0 (0.0)	0.0 (0.0)	0.0 (0.0)	0.0 (0.0)	0.0 (0.0)	0.0 (0.0)	0.0 (0.0)	0.0 (0.0)	0.0 (0.0)	0.0 (0.0)	0.0 (0.0)	0.2 (0.51)
Average precipitation days (≥ 0.01 in)	7.7	8.6	9.0	7.7	8.4	7.8	5.4	5.5	5.6	6.7	7.6	9.3	89.3
Average snowy days (≥ 0.1 in)	0.1	0.0	0.0	0.0	0.0	0.0	0.0	0.0	0.0	0.0	0.0	0.0	0.1
Source 1: NOAA
Source 2: National Weather Service

== Resources ==
source: Army Corps of Engineers, and USGS
