= Seminole Draw =

Coordinates: 32.4464°N 102.3401°W

Location
- Country: United States

Physical characteristics
- Source
  - location: Texas

Seminole Draw is a river in Texas.

== See also ==
- List of rivers of Texas
