= Elm Creek (Cheyenne River tributary) =

Stream in Fall River and Custer County, South Dakota, U.S.

Coordinates: 43°24′59″N 103°17′24″W

Elm Creek is a stream in Fall River and Custer counties, South Dakota, in the United States. It is a tributary of the Cheyenne River.

Elm Creek was named for the elm trees along its banks.

== See also ==
- List of rivers of South Dakota
