= Capano Creek =

Coordinates: 29.7759°N 98.6881°W

Location
- Country: United States

Physical characteristics
- Source
  - location: Texas

Capano Creek is a river in Texas.

== See also ==
- List of rivers of Texas
