= Delaware River (Texas) =

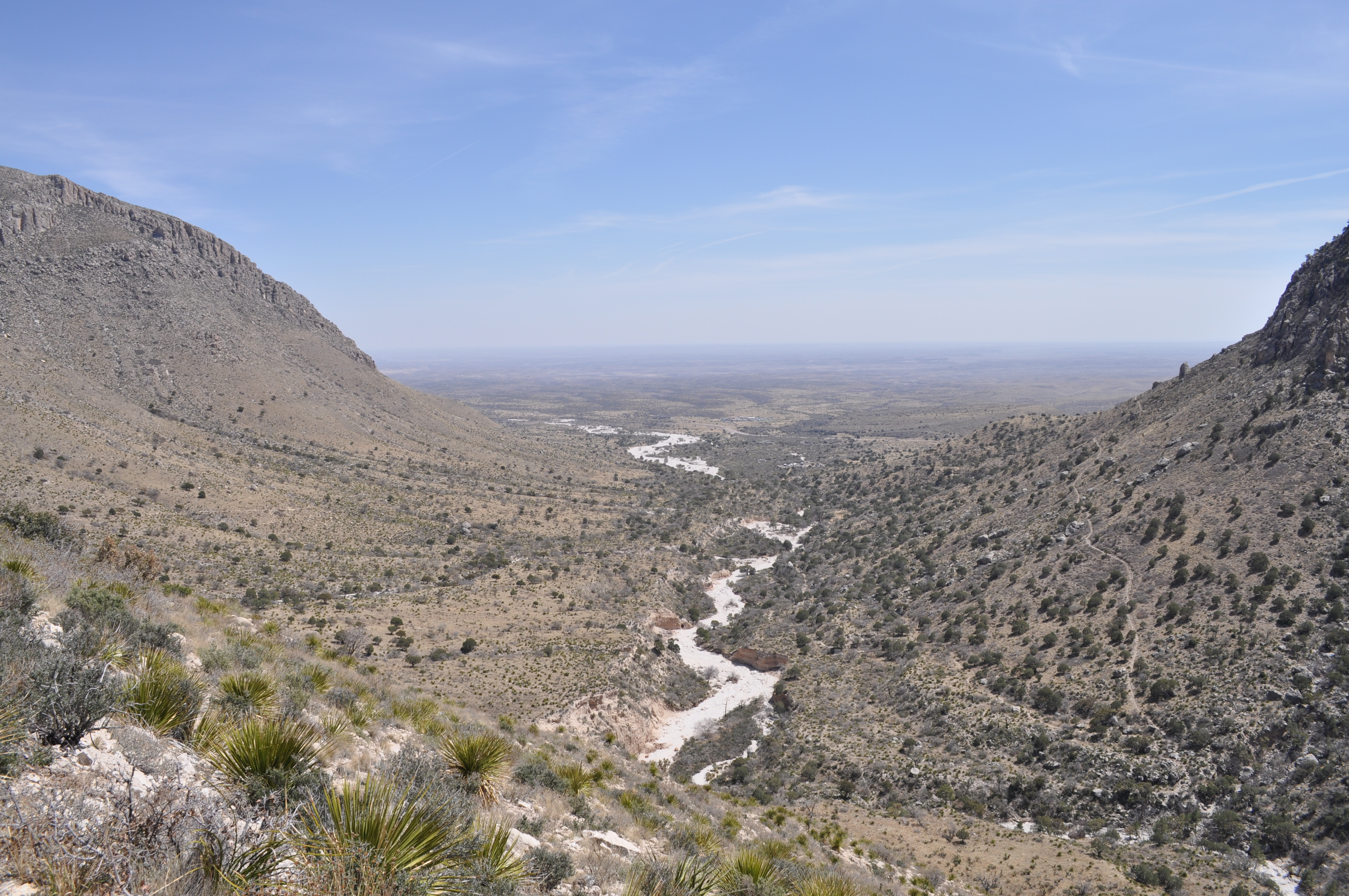
- Pine Springs Canyon and the Delaware River (dry) near its source.

Location
- Country: United States

Physical characteristics
- Source: Delaware Spring
  - location: Culberson County, Texas (31°51′44″N 104°28′23″W)
  - elevation: 2,500 m (8,200 ft)
- Mouth: Pecos River
  - location: Eddy County, New Mexico (32°2′5″N 104°1′15″W)
  - elevation: 865 m (2,838 ft)
- Length: c. 80 kilometres (50 mi)

The Delaware River (Texas) or Delaware Creek is an intermittent stream that rises in Guadalupe Mountains National Park about 8 km (5.0 mi) west of Pine Springs and 3 km (1.9 mi) north of Guadalupe Peak in northwestern Culberson County, Texas. It flows into the Pecos River in New Mexico, 5 km (3.1 mi) north of the border with Texas.

The lower Delaware River.

From its source in the sky island of Guadalupe Mountains National Park, the Delaware River flows through the sparsely populated Chihuahuan Desert. There are no cities or towns along its course, and a few ranches and the small community of Pine Springs (population 51) are the only settlements. The land near the river is mostly used for cattle ranching.

The Delaware River was named after the Delaware Indians who guided early American expeditions to this area, including that of Randolph B. Marcy in 1849. The Butterfield Stage route, beginning in 1858, followed the Delaware River. A stagecoach station was established at Delaware Springs (31°51′57″N 104°28′33″W) where several springs, some with potable water and others mineralized, provided the only reliable source of water for many miles around.

== See also ==
- List of rivers of Texas
