= Tehuacana Creek (Brazos River tributary) =

Coordinates: 31°43′54″N 96°59′32″W

Location
- Country: United States

Physical characteristics
- Source
  - location: Texas

Tehuacana Creek (/təˈwɑːkənə/, Spanish pronunciation: [tewaˈkana]) is a creek in Texas that is a tributary of the Brazos River. Tehuacana Creek rises three miles south of Penelope in southern Hill County (at 31°50' N, 96°54' W) and runs twenty-eight miles southwest to its mouth on the Brazos River, one mile east of Waco (31°31' N, 97°02' W). It enters McLennan County five miles from Penelope. The surrounding flat to rolling terrain is surfaced by dark, commonly calcareous clays and clay and sandy loams that support mesquite, cacti, water-tolerant hardwoods, conifers, and grasses. For most of the county's history, the area has been used as range and crop land.

== See also ==
- List of rivers of Texas
