= Big Cypress, Florida =

Planned community in Collier County, Florida, United States

- Planned community
- Town of Big Cypress
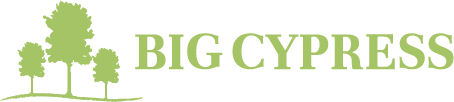
- Wordmark

- Location in Florida Location in the United States
- Coordinates: 26°15′07.0″N 81°30′40.6″W
- Country: US
- State: Florida
- County: Collier
- Website: Official website

Big Cypress is a future planned town in Collier County, Florida. The project, originally called Rural Lands West, is being developed by Collier Enterprises and will consist of three villages, Rivergrass, Longwater, and Bellmar.

The town will be named after nearby Big Cypress National Preserve.

On June 27, 2023 Collier County gave the project its final approval. Despite this, a 2024 ruling by Federal Judge Randolph Moss has stalled the development of Bellmar, citing that its construction violates the Endangered Species Act.

== Geography ==
Big Cypress will be east of Golden Gate Estates and southwest of Ave Maria.

Much of the land being used for the development is currently used for row crops.

=== Villages ===
Rivergrass
The first of the three villages to be approved by the Collier County Planning Commission (2020), the 998-acre (4.04 km^{2}) development will be located off of Oil Well Road in what is currently Immokalee, Florida.

Longwater
The 999-acre (4.04 km^{2}) planned village, to be east of Desoto Boulevard N and south of Oil Well Road, is the second of the three villages to be approved. Of the nearly 1,000 acres, more than 260 are to be dedicated to lakes.

Bellmar
The proposed development, of about 1,800-acre (7.3 km^{2}), is the southernmost community within the town of Big Cypress, about one mile away from the Florida Panther National Wildlife Refuge. The village was approved by the Collier County Planning Commission in 2021.
However, in early 2024, plans for the construction of Bellmar were halted by a federal judge, due to its close proximity to the Wildlife Refuge.

== Controversy ==
The three Big Cypress villages will be within the environmentally sensitive Rural Lands Stewardship Area (RLSA).

Major concerns surround the development's impact on the endangered Florida panther. According to wildlife experts, the project will destroy around 2,000 acres of land that are essential for the continued survival of the already declining population. Another significant concern surrounding the development is the potential increase in Panther-vehicle mortality, which is already a leading cause of Florida panther deaths.
