= Red Oak Creek (Trinity River tributary) =

River in Texas, United States

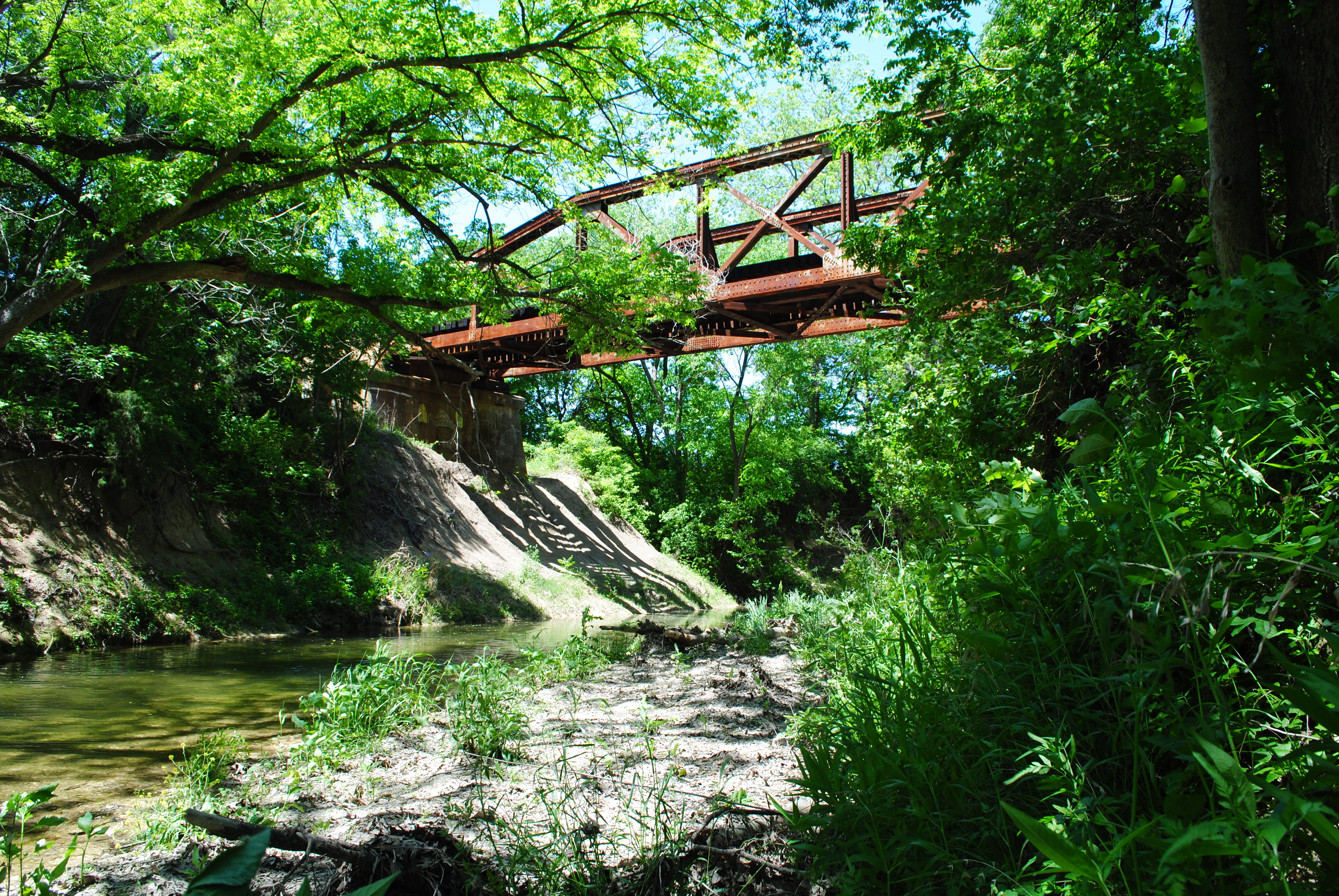
- Railroad truss bridge spanning Red Oak Creek
- Map

Location
- Country: United States
- State: Texas

Red Oak Creek or Bullock Creek is a 35 miles (56 km) stream and tributary of the Trinity River in North Texas.

== Access ==
Most of the land adjacent to the creek is private property, so permission is needed to access these areas. Citizens can enjoy the creek in public areas, such as Heritage Park in Ovilla or Dot Thomas Park in Cedar Hill.

== Course ==
The source of Red Oak Creek is at 32°35′08″N 96°57′34″W in southwestern Dallas County near U.S. Route 67 and the Atchison, Topeka and Santa Fe Railway in Cedar Hill, then flowing through the communities of Cedar Hill, Ovilla, Oak Leaf, and Red Oak.

It enters the Trinity River east of Bristol, Texas in northeast Ellis County at 32°28′31″N 96°30′15″W.
