= Palo Duro Creek =

Location
- Country: United States

Physical characteristics
- Source: North Palo Duro Creek and South Palo Duro Creek
  - location: Morse, Texas
  - coordinates: 36°06′06″N 101°27′54″W
- Mouth: Beaver River
  - location: Hardesty, Oklahoma
  - coordinates: 36°39′22″N 100°58′09″W
- Length: 135 km (84 mi)

Palo Duro Creek is formed in Texas from the junction of North Palo Duro Creek and South Palo Duro Creek north of Morse, Texas. The creek continues generally northeast until it becomes a tributary of the Beaver River (North Canadian River) in Oklahoma at a point east-northeast of Hardesty, Oklahoma, west of Balko, Oklahoma, and north of U.S. Route 412 near the Texas County/Beaver County line, downstream from the Optima Lake project.

North Palo Duro Creek in turn originates at about the Dallam County/Hartley County line east of Dalhart and west of Cactus in Texas. South Palo Duro Creek originates east of the Hartley County/Moore County line, west-northwest of Dumas, Texas.

Palo Duro Creek is impounded at Palo Duro Dam, about 10 miles north of Spearman, Texas. The dam was authorized in 1985. The reservoir was created for both water supply and recreation purposes. The earthen dam has a maximum height of 128 feet and a length of 3,800 feet, with a maximum storage capacity of almost 61,000 acre-feet. It was completed by the County of Moore (providing 72% of the funding), County of Hansford, and City of Stinnett in March 1991. But the reservoir has never reached more than a few percent of its capacity: both the creek and reservoir rely on surface runoff to fill, in an area with little rainfall and prone to drought.

== See also ==
- List of rivers of Texas
