= Isle du Bois Creek (Texas) =

- Map

Location
- Country: United States

Physical characteristics
- Source
  - location: Texas
  - coordinates: 33.502333°N 96.9241695°W
- Mouth
  - coordinates: 33.3617821°N 97.0375087°W

Isle du Bois Creek is a river in Texas.

== See also ==
- List of rivers of Texas
