= Wanderers Creek =

Coordinates: 34°22′33″N 99°23′58″W

Location
- Country: United States

Physical characteristics
- Source
  - location: Texas

Wanderers Creek is a tributary of the Red River in Texas.

== See also ==
- List of rivers of Texas
