= Beech Creek (Texas) =

- Map Map of Beech Creek

Location
- Country: United States

Physical characteristics
- Source
  - location: Texas

Beech Creek (Texas) is a river in Texas.

== See also ==
- List of rivers of Texas
