= Elm Creek (Neosho River tributary) =

Stream in Morris County, Kansas, U.S.

Coordinates: 38.652786°N 96.483614°W

Elm Creek is a stream in Morris County, Kansas, in the United States. It is a tributary of the Neosho River.

Elm Creek was named for the elm trees lining its banks.

== See also ==
- List of rivers of Kansas
