= Garcitas Creek =

River in the United States of America

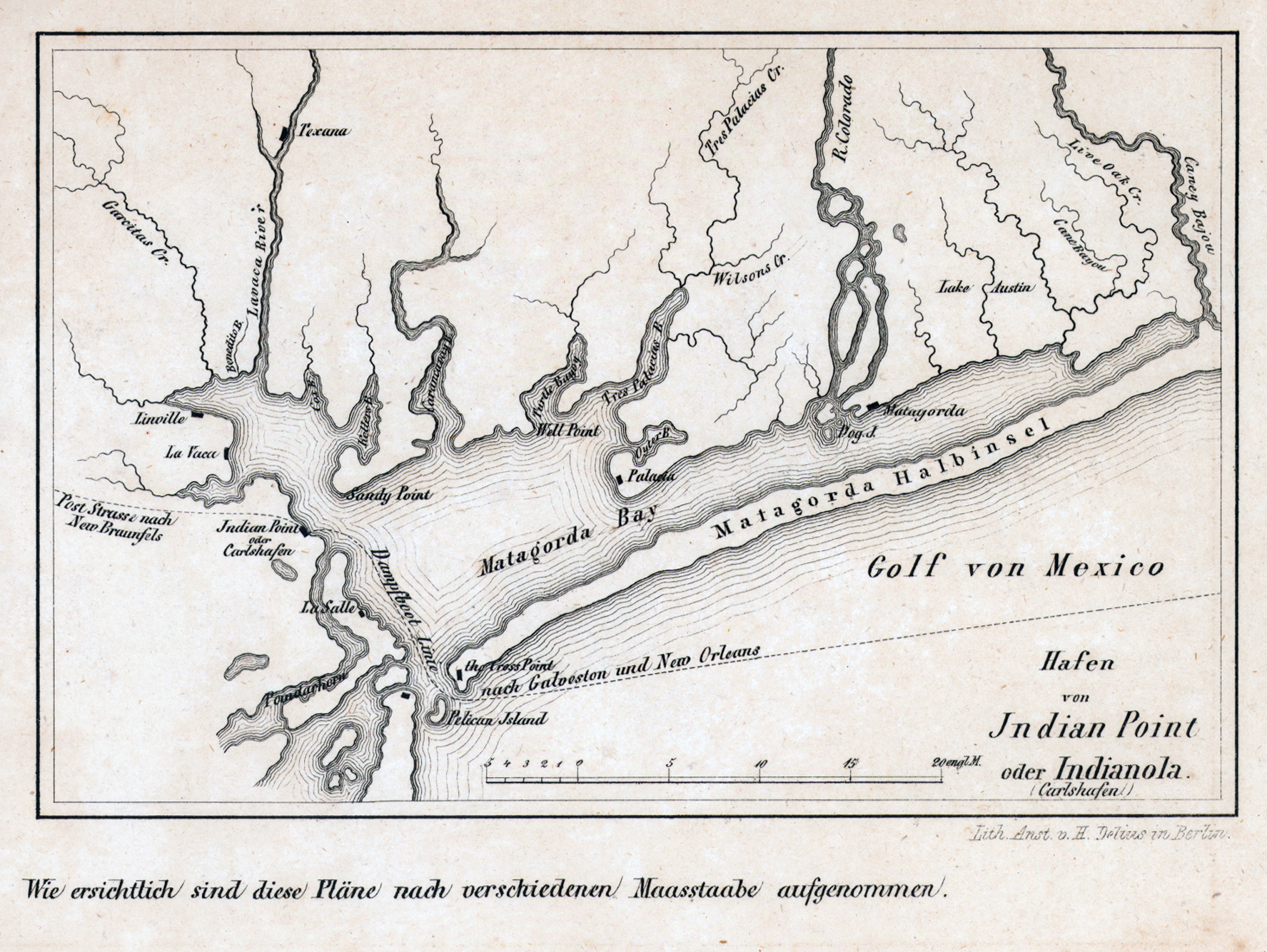
- Garcitas Creek illustration ca. 1851
- Map

Location
- Township: La Salle
- Texas County: Jackson
- Texas County: Victoria
- U.S. State: Texas
- Country: United States

Physical characteristics
- Source: Fordtran, Texas
  - location: DeWitt County, Texas
  - coordinates: 29.050000°N 97.083333°W
  - elevation: 219 ft (67 m)
- Mouth: Lavaca Bay
  - location: Victoria County, Texas
  - coordinates: 28.713927°N 96.659441°W
  - elevation: −.53 ft (−0.16 m)
- Length: 48 miles (77 km)

Basin features
- Inland ports: Port Lavaca, Texas

Garcitas Creek is a 48-mile (77 km) stream in Victoria County and Jackson County, Texas, in the United States. It flows to Garcitas Cove.

Garcitas is a name derived from Spanish meaning the fresh antlers of a deer.

== See also ==
- Fort Saint-Louis (Texas)
