= Piney Creek (Neches River tributary) =

River in Texas, US

Piney Creek (Neches River)

Location
- Country: United States
- Site: Texas

Physical characteristics
- Mouth
  - location: 31.0590°N 94.5623°W

Piney Creek (Neches River) is a river in Texas. By 2005, it supported the greatest number of freshwater mussel species in the Davy Crockett National Forest, indicating that its water quality was not impacted by pollutants or contaminants at tha time.

== See also ==
- List of rivers of Texas
