= Big Cypress Bayou =

River in the United States of America

Coordinates: 32.76°N 94.30°W

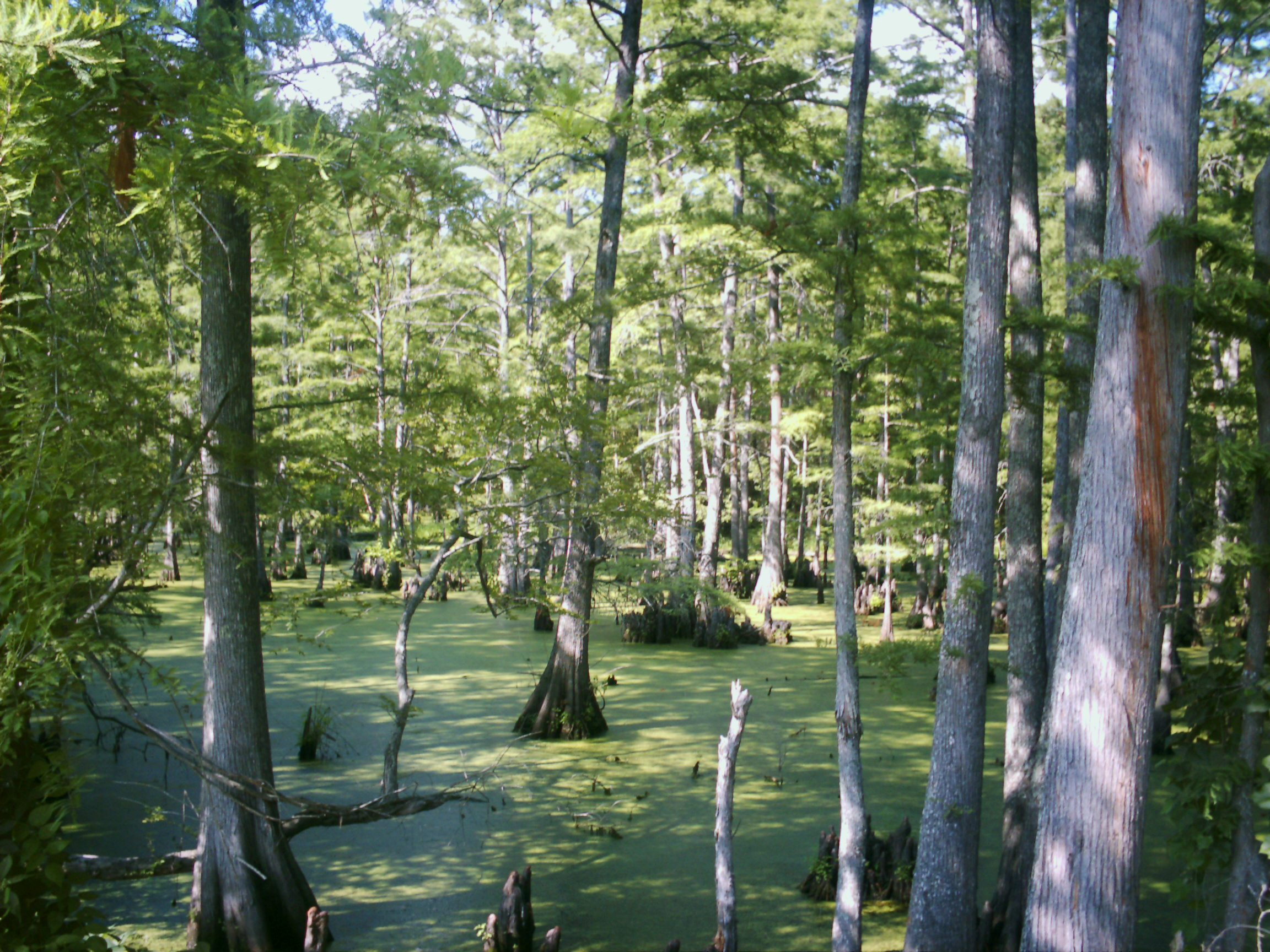
- Big Cypress Bayou in Jefferson, Texas off U.S. Route 59.
- Map

Location
- Country: United States
- State: Texas

Cypress Bayou is the name applied to a series of wetlands at the western edge of Caddo Lake, in and around Jefferson, Texas, making up part of the largest Cypress forest in the world. The bayou is divided into three areas—each part of the watershed of a small river or creek—Little Cypress, Big Cypress, and Black Cypress. The features had been modified, to an extent, by human beings in the 19th and 20th centuries, but today is endangered by pollution, development, and the deforestation, through clear cutting, of the Piney Woods that surround the bayous. Large groves of trees have completely died off, and land has been recently deforested up to the water's edge.

== See also ==
- List of rivers of Texas
- Tributaries of the Red River (East Texas)
