= Hal and Fern Cooper Wildlife Management Area =

Conservation area in Oklahoma

- Hal and Fern Cooper WMA
- IUCN category V (protected landscape/seascape)
- Location within Oklahoma
- Location: Woodward and Harper Counties, Oklahoma
- Nearest city: Fort Supply, Oklahoma
- Coordinates: 36°32′35″N 99°30′40″W.
- Area: 16,080 acres (65.1 km^{2})
- Governing body: Oklahoma Department of Wildlife Conservation (ODWC)

Hal and Fern Cooper Wildlife Management Area, also known as Cooper WMA, is a 16,080 acres (6,510 ha) protected area that spans across Woodward and Harper Counties, Oklahoma. The WMA is owned and managed by the Oklahoma Department of Wildlife Conservation (ODWC).

== Location ==
Located Northeast of Fort Supply and adjacent to the 5,418 acres (2,193 ha) Fort Supply WMA. Beaver River joins Wolf Creek to form the North Canadian River within the WMA.

== History ==
According to ODWC deputy director Charles Wallace the Coopers had spent many years building a successful ranch and wanted it to be kept together and enjoyed by others. In 1992 Mrs. Cooper donated 2,498.68 acres and the state of Oklahoma purchased the rest, agreeing to continue to pay the ad valorem taxes so the counties would not lose revenue.

== Description ==
The WMA contains mixed prairie grass and sagebrush is found on the upland sites interspersed with sand plum thickets. 4,500 acres (1,800 ha) of river bottom contains cottonwood, American elm, hackberry and eastern red cedar interspersed with sand plum thickets, salt cedar and mixed grassland. Wildlife includes pheasant, quail dove, duck, geese, deer, turkey, rabbits (cottontails and jackrabbits), coyote, bobcat and raccoons. Bald Eagles winter on Fort Supply WMA and have been seen on Cooper WMA.

== See also ==
List of Oklahoma Wildlife Management Areas
