= Coldwater Creek (Oklahoma) =

Stream in the United States

Location
- Country: United States

Physical characteristics
- Source
  - location: Cimarron County, Oklahoma
  - coordinates: 36.4978°N 102.8927°W
- Mouth
  - location: Beaver River, Oklahoma
  - coordinates: 36.65974°N 101.12127°W
- Basin size: 1,903 mi^{2} (4,930 km^{2})

Coldwater Creek is an intermittently-flowing stream in northeastern New Mexico, and the panhandles of Oklahoma and Texas. As far back as 1907, the USGS reported that Coldwater Creek is a dry sand bed most of the year. One source says that Coldwater Creek is also known as Rabbit Ears Creek, because it rises near Rabbit Ears, a pair of mountain peaks in Union County, New Mexico. According to the United States Geological Survey (USGS), Coldwater Creek drains an area of 1,903 square miles (4,930 km^{2}).

== Stream course ==
From New Mexico, it enters the south-west corner of Cimarron County, Oklahoma in the Oklahoma Panhandle. It passes easterly through Dallam, Sherman, and Hansford counties in the Texas Panhandle. Returning into the Oklahoma Panhandle, the course passes through the Optima National Wildlife Refuge, before joining the Beaver River in Texas County, Oklahoma 0.2 miles (0.32 km) above Optima Lake Dam. (Note: Beaver River is the portion of the North Canadian River that flows through the Oklahoma Panhandle. The North Canadian flows into the Canadian River in eastern Oklahoma, then into the Arkansas River.)

== Optima Lake ==
Optima Lake was built to be a reservoir about 4.5 miles (7.2 km) northeast of Hardesty, Oklahoma or 20 miles (32 km) east of Guymon. The lake is essentially dry most of the time, because of declining water table levels and periodic droughts that have affected the panhandles of Oklahoma and Texas. (Note: The water level behind Optima Dam never reached its "normal pool" level after construction.) As a result, the lake project (completed in 1978), was largely abandoned in 2010 when picnic tables and other structures were demolished for safety reasons. Public use areas have been left open, but are overgrown by vegetation and without services such as electricity and water. Major improvements have been postponed indefinitely because of budget cuts to the Corps of Engineers.

== See also ==
- List of rivers of Oklahoma
- List of rivers of Texas
- Optima Lake
