= Beaver River (Oklahoma) =

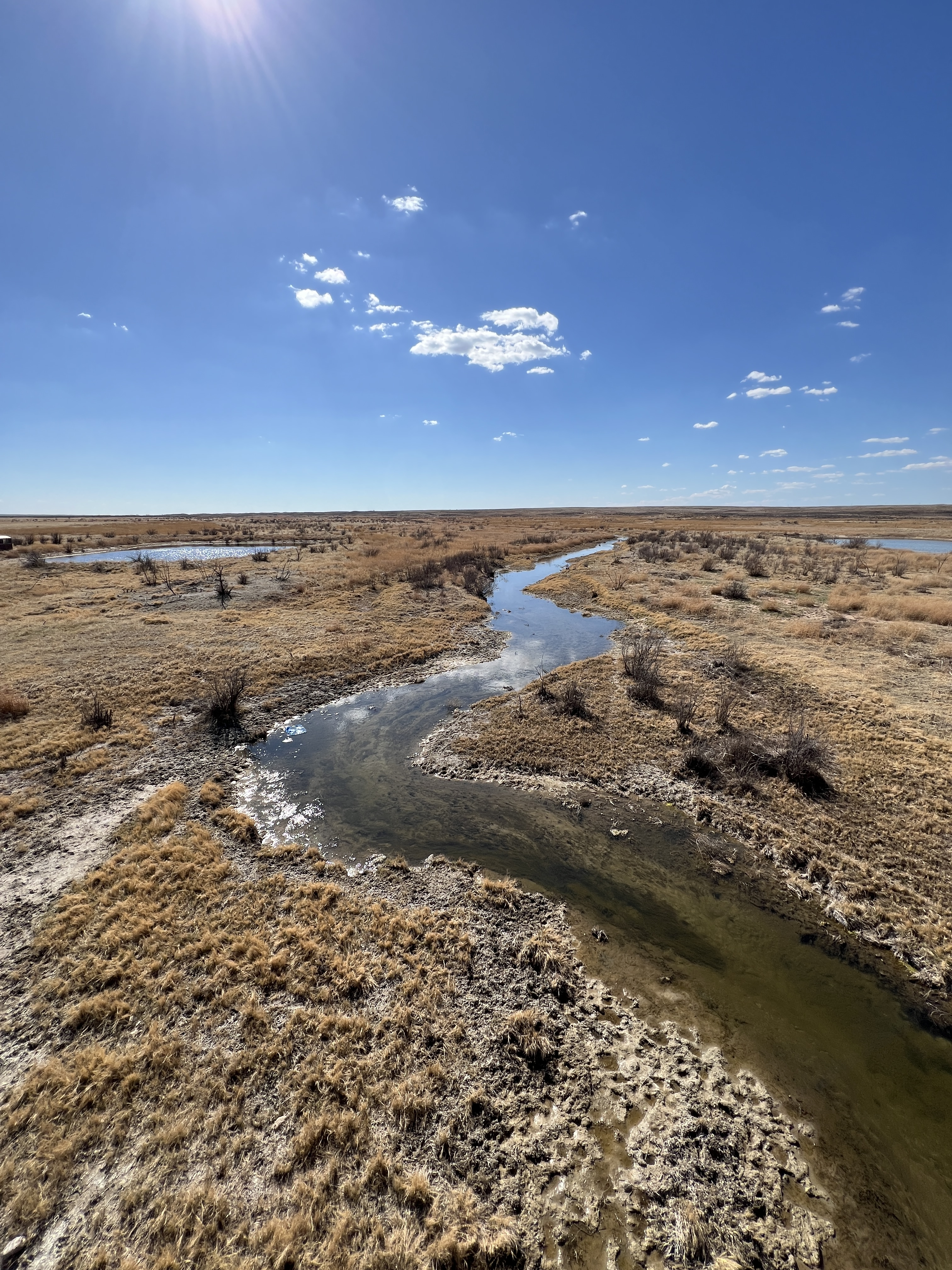
- Beaver River at US83 crossing in Oklahoma

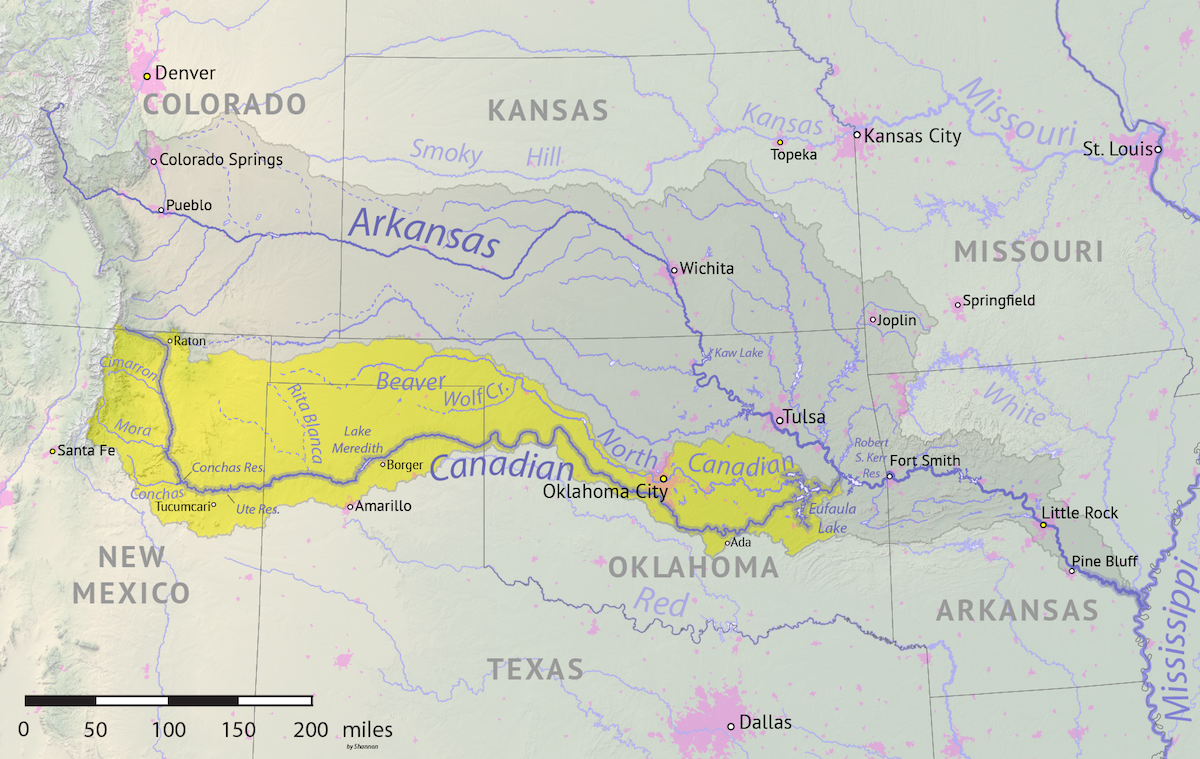
- Map of the Canadian River watershed showing the Beaver River

Location
- Country: United States
- States: Oklahoma, Texas

Physical characteristics
- Source
  - location: Cimarron County, Oklahoma
  - coordinates: 36.5972471°N 102.867978°W
- Mouth: North Canadian River
  - location: Woodward County, Oklahoma
  - coordinates: 36.5889236°N 99.5017789°W
  - elevation: 1,952 ft (595 m)
- Length: 280 mi (450 km)
- Basin size: 11,690 square miles (30,300 km^{2})
- Discharge
  - location: Fort Supply
  - average: 190 cu ft/s (5.4 m^{3}/s)

The Beaver River is an intermittent river, 280 miles (450 km) long, in western Oklahoma and northern Texas in the United States. It is a tributary of the North Canadian River, draining an area of 11,690 square miles (30,300 km^{2}) in a watershed that extends to northeastern New Mexico and includes most of the Oklahoma Panhandle.

== Course ==
The Beaver River is formed in Cimarron County, Oklahoma, by the confluence of Corrumpa Creek and Seneca Creek and flows generally eastward throughout its course. From Cimarron County it dips southward and travels for 15 miles (24 km) through Sherman County, Texas, then returns to Oklahoma for the remainder of its course, flowing through Texas, Beaver, Harper, Ellis, and Woodward Counties. The river passes to the north of the city of Guymon, continues through the Optima Lake project where it is joined by Coldwater Creek just before the dam, flows through the town of Beaver, and passes to the north of the town of Fort Supply. Northeast of Fort Supply, the Beaver River joins Wolf Creek to form the North Canadian River in the Hal and Fern Cooper WMA.

== Name and variants ==
The name "North Canadian River" has sometimes been applied to the Beaver River and one of its headwaters tributaries, Corrumpa Creek, including by the U.S. federal government from 1914 to 1970. A 1914 decision by the U.S. Board on Geographic Names (USBGN) defined the North Canadian River as including both streams as part of its course, with "Beaver River" as a variant name for a segment of it. A 1970 USBGN decision revised the 1914 definition, defining the Beaver River as beginning at the confluence of Corrumpa Creek and Seneca Creek, and ending where it joins Wolf Creek to form the North Canadian River. The USBGN's Geographic Names Information System lists "Beaver Creek," "North Canadian River," "North Fork Canadian River," and "North Fork of Canadian River" as historical variant names for the river.

== Flow ==
The river was known for occasional floods, including an October 1923 flood amounting to 109,000 acre-feet of water, and a September 1941 flood in which the Beaver's flow increased to 44,200 cubic feet per second. The river's most recent flow of significance was in October 1965 at 17,800 cubic feet per second.

Currently, the Beaver River and its tributaries flow with water intermittently, in part because the underground source of the river, the Ogallala Aquifer, being the water table beneath far western Oklahoma and parts of seven other Western states, as well, has been subject to depletion in recent decades due to increased irrigation and drinking-water withdrawals. Water flow in the Beaver at Guymon, in the years prior to the start of construction on the Optima Lake dam (1937–1966) averaged 32.2 ft^{3}/s, but only 7 ft^{3}/s in the decade (1977–1987) after the dam was built. In the last five years (1989–1993 inclusive) that the U.S. Geological Survey could measure its current near Guymon, the Beaver's flow averaged less than one-fifth of 1 ft^{3}/s. A few short stretches, such as McNees Crossing (one mile east of New Mexico State Road 406), have persistent flow. The remainder flows under the sand except after rain falls or snow melts. The area drained by the Beaver River in the high plains of northeastern New Mexico and the Oklahoma and Texas panhandles is semi-arid, receiving an average of 20 inches (51 cm) of precipitation annually.

The Beaver does occasionally still flow some distance. It was reported on April 18, 2016, that the river was flowing near Guymon for the first time in decades following two days of intense rains that caused Texas County to be declared a disaster area. In June 2024, the Guymon area received 7.61 inches of rain in one night which left the Beaver River with fast-moving water.

== Tributaries ==
Some of the major tributaries of Beaver River are (from west to east):

1. Seneca Creek a/k/a Cienequilla Creek (36.597247°N 102.867422°W)
2. Sand Creek (36.597525°N 101.769329°W)
3. Tepee Creek (36.691692°N 101.681828°W)
4. Goff Creek (36.725859°N 101.471827°W)
5. Pony Creek (36.718637°N 101.270438°W)
6. Coldwater Creek (36.659749°N 101.121271°W)
7. Palo Duro Creek (36.655583°N 100.964881°W)
8. Red Horse Creek (36.695026°N 100.916269°W)
9. Bull Creek (36.694471°N 100.915992°W)
10. Jackson Creek (36.788081°N 100.812936°W)
11. Sharp Creek (36.797525°N 100.806825°W)
12. Willow Creek (36.818081°N 100.713489°W)
13. Elm Creek (36.818081°N 100.667098°W)
14. Dugout Creek (36.819748°N 100.626264°W)
15. Home Creek (36.823359°N 100.534872°W)
16. Timber Creek (36.821694°N 100.394312°W)
17. Camp Creek (36.787250°N 100.351533°W)
18. Kidds Creek (36.776141°N 100.225418°W)
19. Mexico Creek (36.765308°N 100.191806°W)
20. Kiowa Creek (36.758921°N 99.905685°W)
21. Spring Creek (36.684478°N 99.855126°W)
22. Clear Creek (36.648923°N 99.7679°W)

== See also ==
- Beaver Dunes Park
- List of rivers of Oklahoma
- List of rivers of Texas
