= Corrumpa Creek =

River in New Mexico and Oklahoma, US

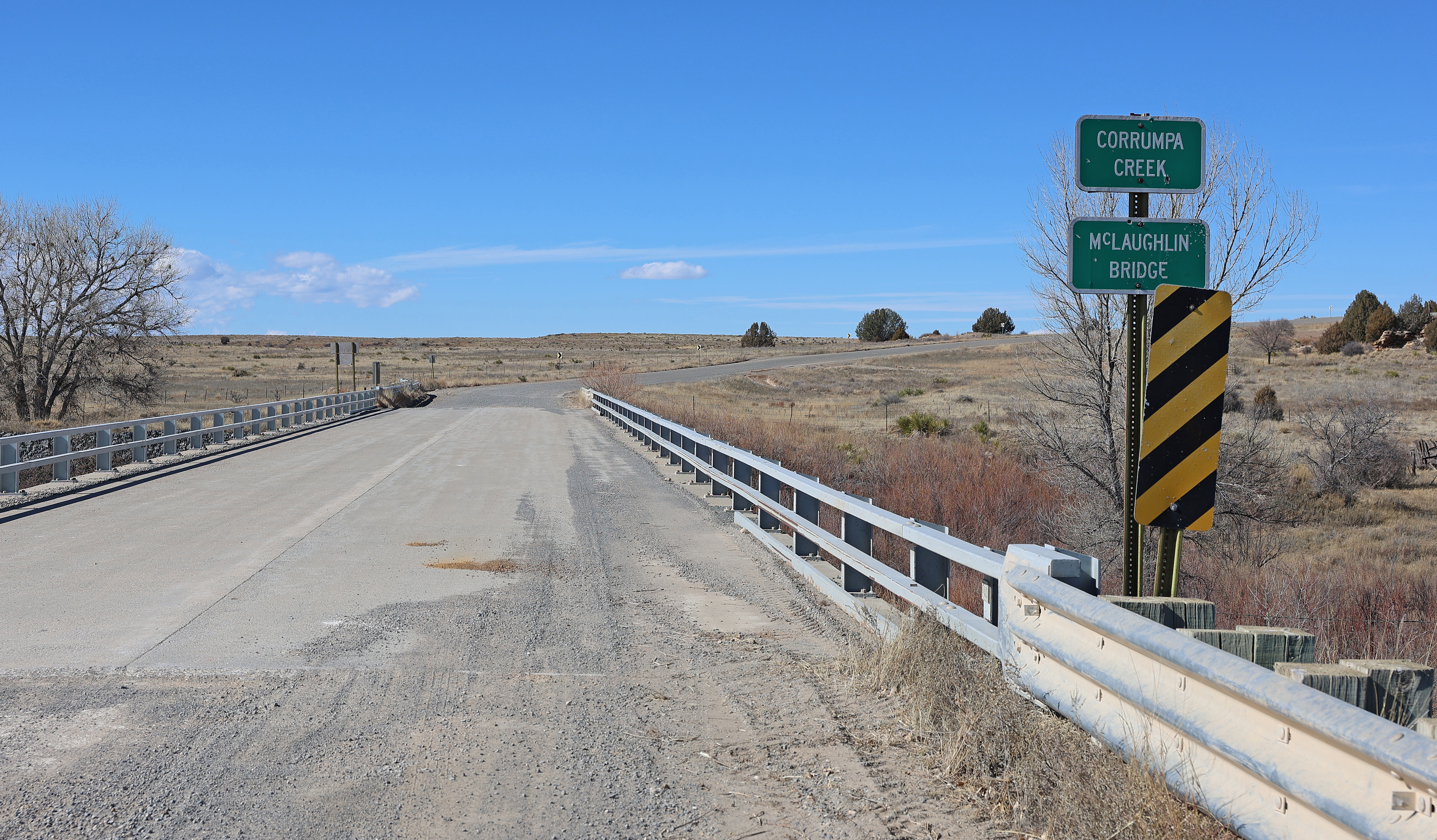
- A bridge carrying New Mexico State Road 370 over the creek

Location
- Country: United States

Physical characteristics
- Source
  - location: Weatherly Lake, New Mexico
- Mouth
  - location: Northwest of Felt, Oklahoma
  - coordinates: 36°35′50″N 102°52′04″W

Basin features
- Progression: Beaver River → North Canadian River → Canadian River → Arkansas → Mississippi

Corrumpa Creek is a watercourse in New Mexico and Oklahoma. It originates at Weatherly Lake, located 9 miles east-southeast of Des Moines in Union County, New Mexico. It results from the South Branch Corrumpa Creek, which originates south-southwest of Des Moines and travels generally east, and the North Branch Corrumpa Creek, which originates southwest of Des Moines but passes northeast through the town before continuing generally east-southeast, having their confluence at Weatherly Lake. Both of these forks of Corrumpa Creek head on the slopes of Sierra Grande at approximately 8,720 feet (2,660 m). From that location, Corrumpa Creek meanders in every direction but generally east before turning southeast near the Oklahoma border. It continues into Oklahoma where, at the point where it is joined by Seneca Creek (also known as Cienequilla Creek) about 4.5 miles (7.2 km) northwest of Felt, Oklahoma, it officially becomes the Beaver River.

Historically, McNees Crossing on Corrumpa Creek, about 3.5 miles inside New Mexico, was an important location on the Santa Fe Trail. It was easy to find, marked as it was by twin peaks known as Rabbit Ears Mountain; it provided water for travelers at an easy stream fording point; and, it was located in an area with plentiful wood as well as grazing lands for livestock.

== See also ==
- List of rivers of New Mexico
- List of rivers of Oklahoma
