= Sierra Grande =

Extinct stratovolcano in New Mexico

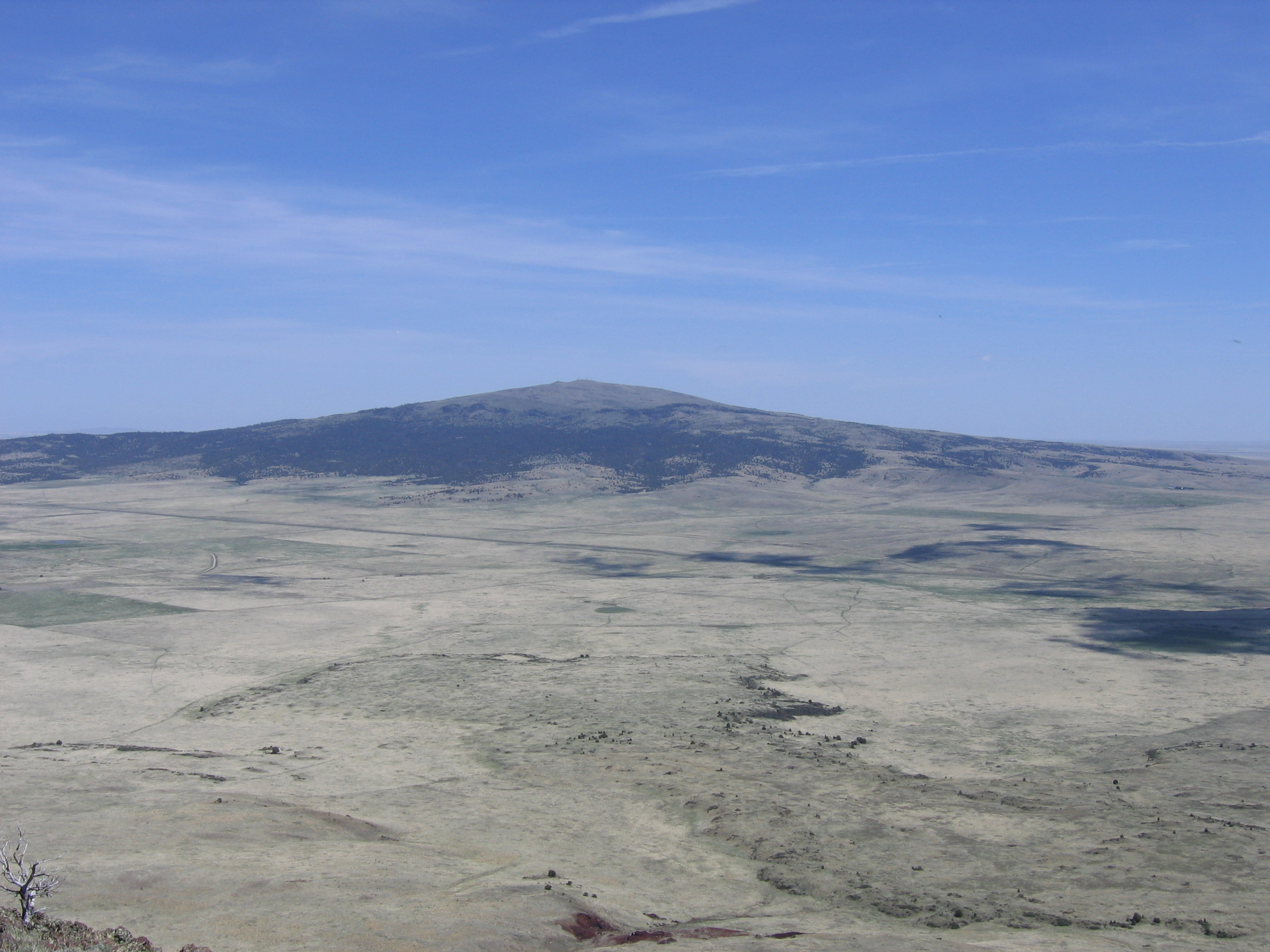
- Sierra Grande seen from the top of Capulin Volcano.

Highest point
- Elevation: 8,723 ft (2,659 m) NAVD 88
- Prominence: 1,880 ft (570 m)
- Coordinates: 36°42′20″N 103°52′36″W

Geography
- Location: Union County, New Mexico, U.S.
- Topo map: USGS Capulin

Geology
- Mountain type: Stratovolcano
- Volcanic field: Raton-Clayton volcanic field

Climbing
- Easiest route: Hike

Sierra Grande is an extinct stratovolcano in northeastern New Mexico that rises 2,200 feet above the surrounding plain. It is part of the inactive Raton-Clayton volcanic field.

== Geography ==
On a clear day, Sierra Grande can be seen from as far away as Texline, Texas, as well as from the summits of the Culebra Range in southern Colorado and northern New Mexico. The eastern slopes of Sierra Grande are the easternmost point in the United States with an elevation of more than 8,000 feet (2,400 m) above sea level, and the peak is the highest in the United States east of 104 degrees west.

U.S. Highway 64, U.S. Highway 87 and the Colorado and Southern Railway run along the north and east of the volcano. The town of Des Moines is just to the northeast. To the northwest is Capulin Volcano National Monument featuring Capulin Volcano, an extinct cinder cone also in the Raton-Clayton volcanic field.

Numerous watercourses form on and around the flanks of the volcano, including Pinabete Creek (which feeds into the Dry Cimarron River to the northeast), North Branch Corrumpa Creek and South Branch Corrumpa Creek (which join and become Corrumpa Creek to the east at Weatherly Lake), Seneca Creek, and Carrizo Creek.

== Geology ==
Sierra Grande is the largest volcano in the Raton-Clayton volcanic field. Its flows range in age from 3.8 to 2.6 million years. The volcano is largely composed of two-pyroxene andesite, a rock type found almost nowhere else in the Raton-Clayton volcanic field.

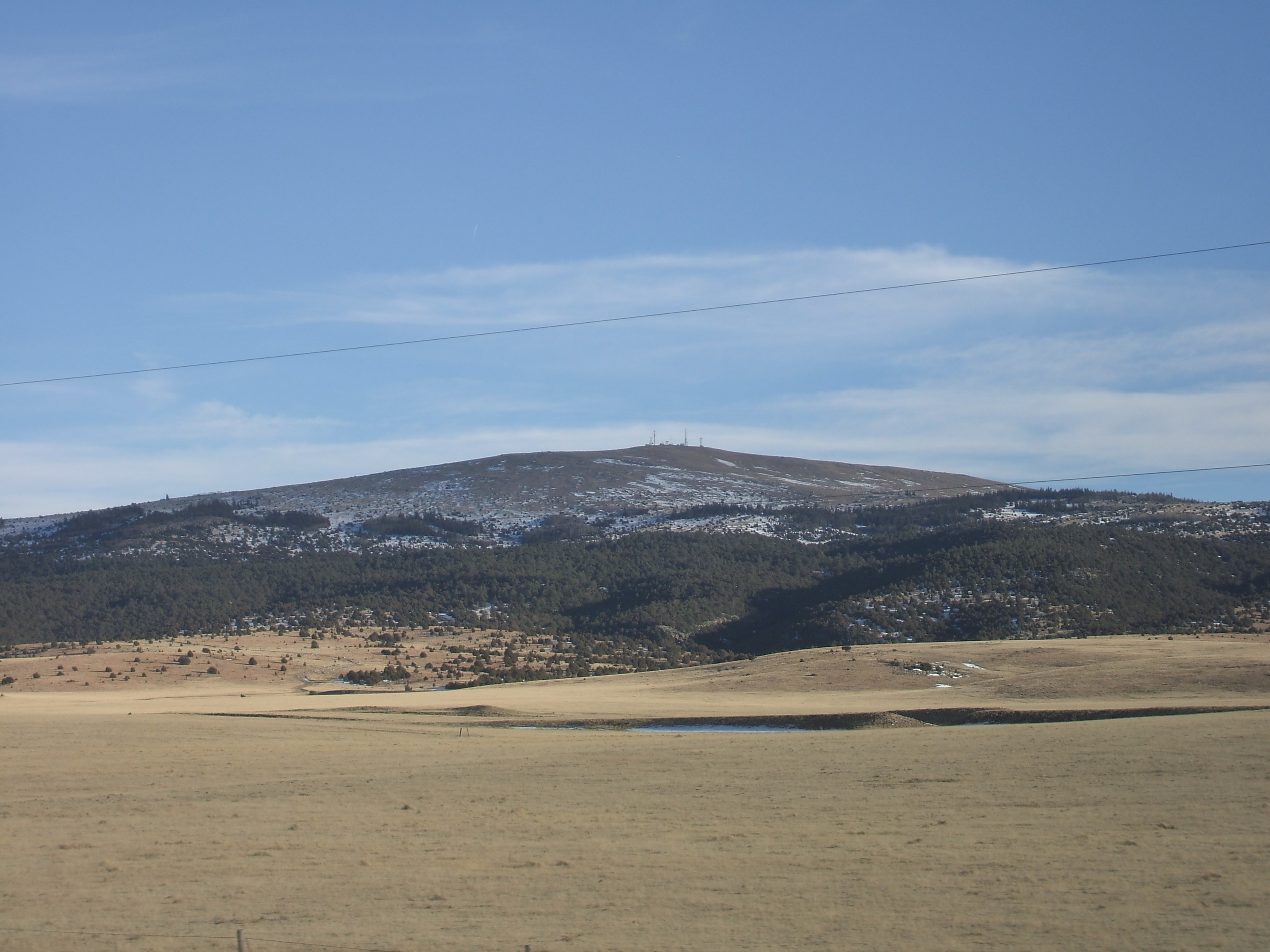
Sierra Grande as seen from the north along US Highways 64 and 87

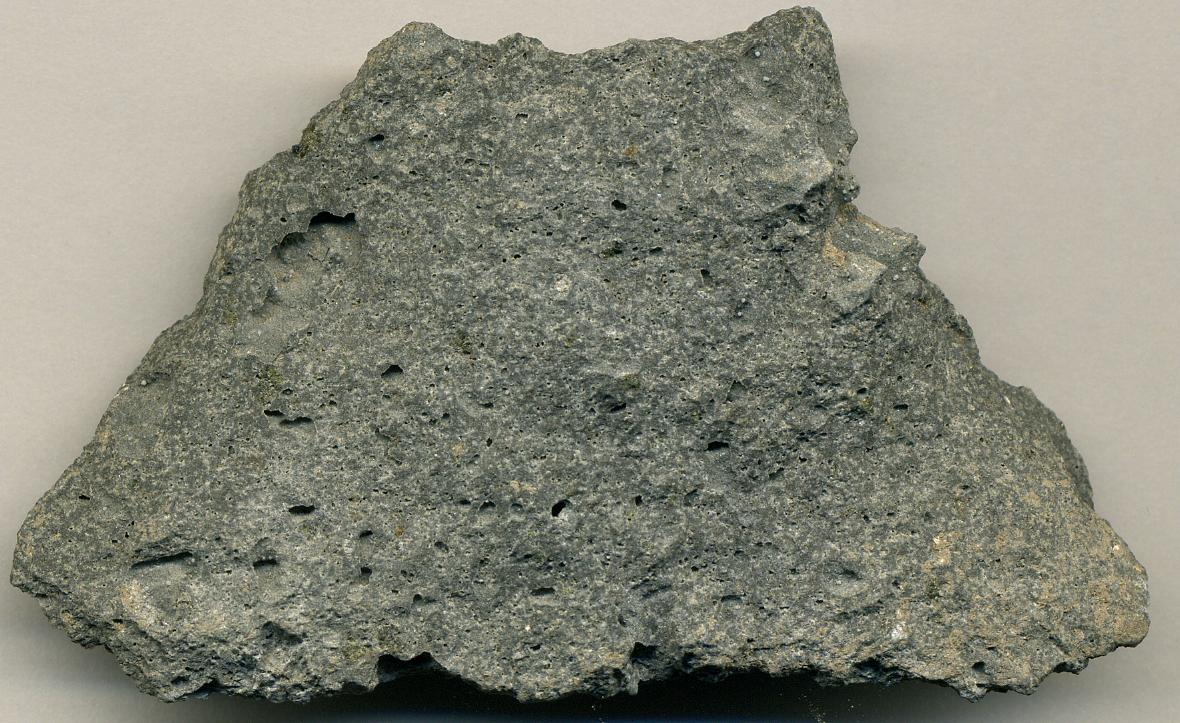
Andesite from a 1.9 million year old lava flow, on the eastern side of Sierra Grande.
