= Optima Lake =

Unused reservoir in Oklahoma, US

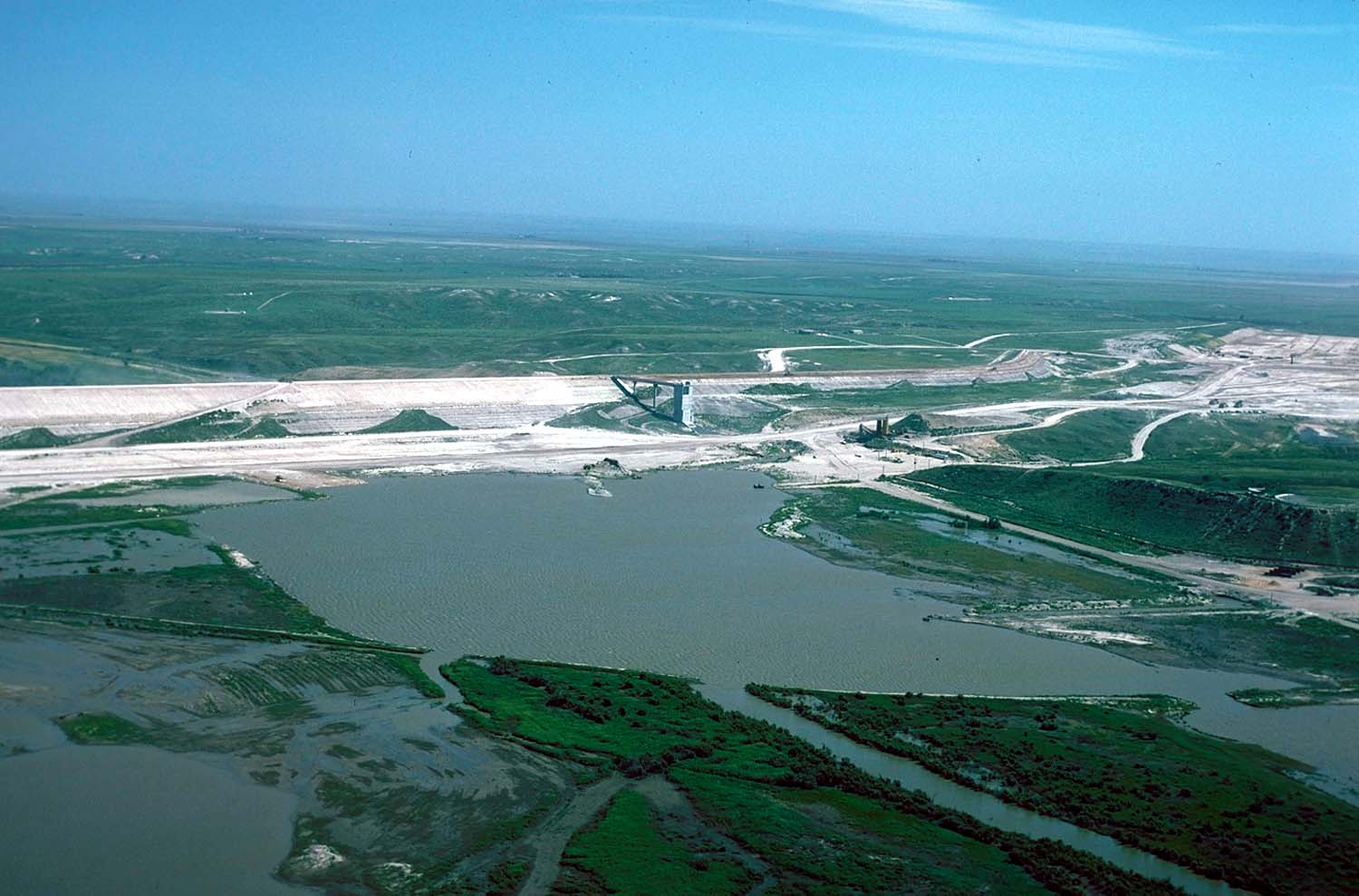
- Optima Lake and Dam in June of 1986

- Location within Oklahoma Location within the United States
- Location: Texas County, Oklahoma
- Coordinates: 36°39′42″N 101°08′12″W
- Type: Reservoir
- Basin countries: United States
- Surface elevation: 2,766 feet (843 m)
- Settlements: Hardesty, Oklahoma

Optima Lake was built to be a reservoir in Texas County, Oklahoma. The site is just north of Hardesty and east of Guymon in the Oklahoma Panhandle.

The earthen Optima Lake Dam (National ID # OK20510) was completed in 1978 (48 years ago) by the United States Army Corps of Engineers, with a height of 120 feet (37 m), and a length at its crest of 16,875 feet (5,144 m). Although designed to contain a maximum of 618,500 acre-feet (762,900,000 m^{3}) of water, the lake never reached more than five percent of capacity, and remains effectively empty. Rapid declines in streamflow related to large-scale pumping from the high plains aquifer system, also known as the Ogallala Aquifer, coincided with the completion of the dam, to make the reservoir a dramatic example of unanticipated environmental impacts.

The Corps' website states in part (emphasis in original):

All public use areas around the lake are land access points only, and do not offer swimming, boating, fishing or camping opportunities. The water level in the lake has never reached normal pool. Visitors should be aware that the lake's level is very low, and is often times dry. Visitors wanting to picnic or view wildlife should come for the quiet natural setting -- with or without water in the lake area.

The lake surroundings offer few to no amenities since lake camping facilities and buildings were dismantled for public safety by the Corps in 2010.

== History ==
The project was originally included as part of the Flood Control Act of 1936, as modified by the Flood Control Act of 1950, but planning and political wrangling delayed the start of construction until 1966. The intent was for the reservoir to fill primarily from the flow of the Beaver River, also known as the North Canadian River. Normal flow on the Beaver River, from 1937 to 1966, averaged 32.2 cubic feet per second. The river had occasional floods, including an October 1923 flood amounting to 109,000 acre-feet (134,000,000 m^{3}) of water, and a September 1941 flood in which the Beaver's flow increased to 44,200 cubic feet per second (1,250 m^{3}/s). The river's most recent flow of significance was in October 1965 at 17,800 cubic feet per second (500 m^{3}/s). In the end the project was authorized for flood control, drinking and irrigation water in the relatively dry Oklahoma panhandle, recreation, and fish and wildlife conservation.

The Guymon Chamber of Commerce, which enthusiastically backed the project, published a pamphlet that touted its expected virtues. The brochure forecast that the lake would be 100 feet (30 m) deep, and its arms would flood up to 10 miles (16 km) up Beaver River and 9 miles (14 km) along its tributary, Coldwater Creek.

During the 12 years of construction by the U.S. Army Corps of Engineers, the flow of the Beaver dropped. It was later recognized that because the source of the Beaver was the underground Ogallala Aquifer, being the water table underlying far western Oklahoma and parts of seven other Western states, and due to increased takings from the aquifer for irrigation and drinking water, the river's flow was being reduced to a trickle.

The $46.1-million project was completed in 1978. The dam was constructed of compacted earth fill embankment with gated outlet works and a 1,500 foot (460 m) long uncontrolled saddle spillway. The top of the dam is at 2,821.0 feet (859.8 m) of elevation above sea level. The specifications put the top of the maximum pool at 2,814.2 feet (857.8 m), the top of the flood control pool at 2,779.0 feet (847.0 m), the top of the conservation pool at 2,763.5 feet (842.3 m), and the top of the inactive pool at 2,726.0 feet (830.9 m). The conservation pool was designed to hold 117,500 acre-feet (144,900,000 m^{3}) of water, with 76,200 acre-feet (94,000,000 m^{3}) designated to be available as a water supply. The flood pool capacity was designed for 229,500 acre-feet (283,100,000 m^{3}), while absolute maximum capacity of the lake was set at 618,500 acre-feet (762,900,000 m^{3}). The Corps forecasted in 1979 that, "The optimum visitation for the project is 600,000 annual visitors and will be reached in 2014."

But water flow in the Beaver, 1977–1987, averaged only 7 cubic feet per second (0.20 m^{3}/s), far less than the 32.2 cubic feet per second (0.91 m^{3}/s) historical average. In the mid-1980s, the Corps recognized that the reduced flow of the Beaver was permanent and that the reservoir was not going to fill: the maximum lake level was achieved May 31, 1980 at an elevation of 2,722.90 feet (829.94 m), whereas the very bottom of the conservation pool was intended to be 2,726.00 feet (830.88 m). Subsequently, the flow in the Beaver dropped even further. In the last five year period (from 1989–1993) that the U.S. Geological Survey could measure its flow near Guymon, the river averaged less than 0.2 cubic feet per second (5.7 L/s).

The Corps formally closed the park in 1995, although the site remained open to the public. With funding from the American Recovery and Reinvestment Act of 2009, about 161 decaying structures including picnic enclosures, campsites, restrooms, dump stations, and numerous power poles, were demolished by September 2010 for safety reasons. As of 2014, the project was receiving 2000 to 5000 visitors annually.

A spending controversy erupted in 2009, when the Corps wanted to use $1.2 million of economic stimulus money to replace rotting guardrails on each side of the paved road across the top of the Optima Dam used by approximately 15 cars a day. Public criticism caused the Corps to instead gate and padlock the road at a cost of $1000. The Corps' September 2010 Section 216 Initial Appraisal Report on Optima Lake indicated the Corps was spending approximately $160,000 per year for annual inspections of dam structures, detailed inspections at five year intervals, and repairs as budgets allowed. That same report indicated that existing dam structures (gate tower, stilling basin, uncontrolled spillway and outlet works) remained in operational condition.

In the 1973 Environmental Impact Statement done by the Corps during the planning process, a "dry lake" option for the project was considered which would have provided for no water retention during normal periods, but would have created an area available as a flood containment pool in the event of abnormally large water events in the area. That concept for Optima was rejected in favor of an active water-containment reservoir; however, the project as it currently exists is consistent with the dry lake option. The Beaver does occasionally still carry off surface flooding after heavy rains, as in April 2016 when the river was flowing near Guymon for the first time in decades following two days of intense rains that caused Texas County to be declared a disaster area, and again in June 2024 when the Guymon area received 7.61 inches of rain in one night which left the Beaver River with fast-moving water.

The overall project included the Optima National Wildlife Refuge, run by the US Fish and Wildlife Service, being initially 2,605 acres (1,054 ha) along Coldwater Creek—which has its confluence with the Beaver 0.2 miles (0.32 km) upstream from the dam— and the Optima Wildlife Management Area, public hunting lands managed by the Oklahoma Department of Wildlife Conservation, initially 2,141 acres (866 ha) along the Beaver. However, the decreased size of the lake itself has led to Optima National Wildlife Refuge being increased to 4,334 acres (1,754 ha), and the area managed by Oklahoma, including licensed Corps lands above and below the dam, increasing to 8,062 acres (3,263 ha).

== Disposition studies ==
The Secretary of the Army is authorized to conduct Disposition Studies under the Flood Control Act of 1970 to review operations of completed projects when advisable due to changed physical, economic, or environmental conditions. Given Optima’s shortcomings, the Corps did an Appraisal Report in 1991 to explore modifying the project, recommending that a reconnaissance level study be conducted to evaluate possible alternatives. But, funding for the follow-up study was not provided. Another Appraisal Report was done in 2010, also recommending a reconnaissance level study. Ideas floated in that Appraisal Report included (but were not limited to) piping Guymon sewage plant-treated water to Optima (about 17 miles), transferring lands to other agencies, reselling the lands to the original landowners, or deauthorizing the project and demolishing all structures. However, it was not until 2021 that funding was provided for a Disposition Study. As presented at an October 5, 2022 public meeting, the Disposition Study considered multiple alternatives, including (but not limited to): (a) No Action (the continuation of existing operations), (b) retaining just the dam structure as a dry flood control reservoir, (c) transferring operations to another federal or state agency to maintain a flood control project, or (d) deauthorizing the entire project and disposing of all real property. The resulting Report of Findings in April 2025 concluded that disposal of the facility was not advisable because operational features of Optima Lake were functioning as authorized for the purposes of flood risk management, recreation, and fish and wildlife. The report also noted difficulty in identifying any other entity willing to take responsibility for the project, as well as the high cost to deconstruct the project’s physical features.

== Gallery ==
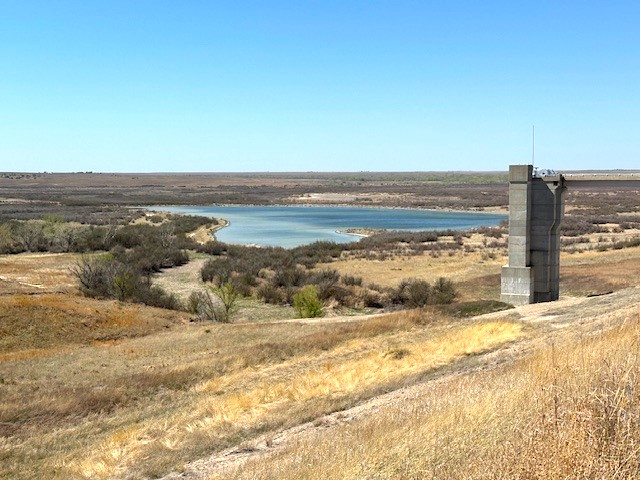
The lake as viewed from the dam w/intake tower at right, 4-2024

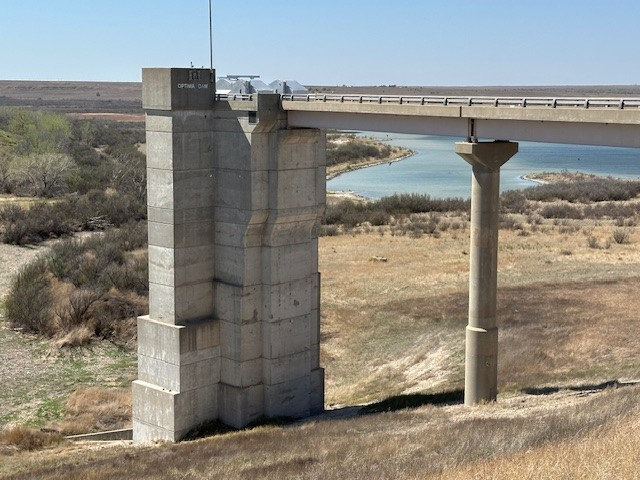
Intake tower with service bridge at Optima Lake Dam, April 2024

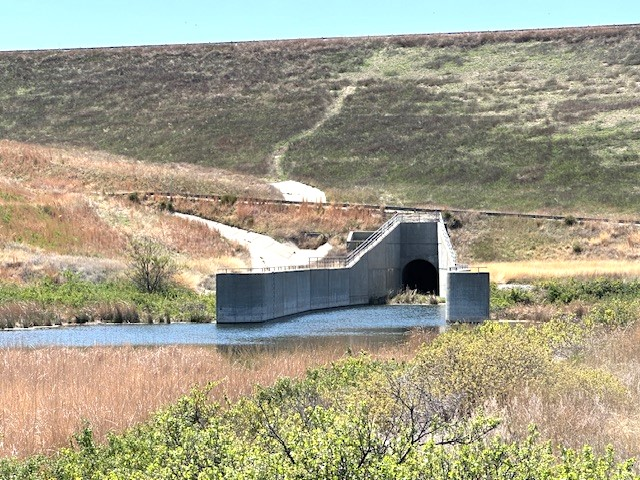
Water outlet below the dam, April 2024
