= Rabbit Ear Mountain =

- Rabbit Ears
- U.S. National Register of Historic Places
- U.S. National Historic Landmark District
- NM State Register of Cultural Properties
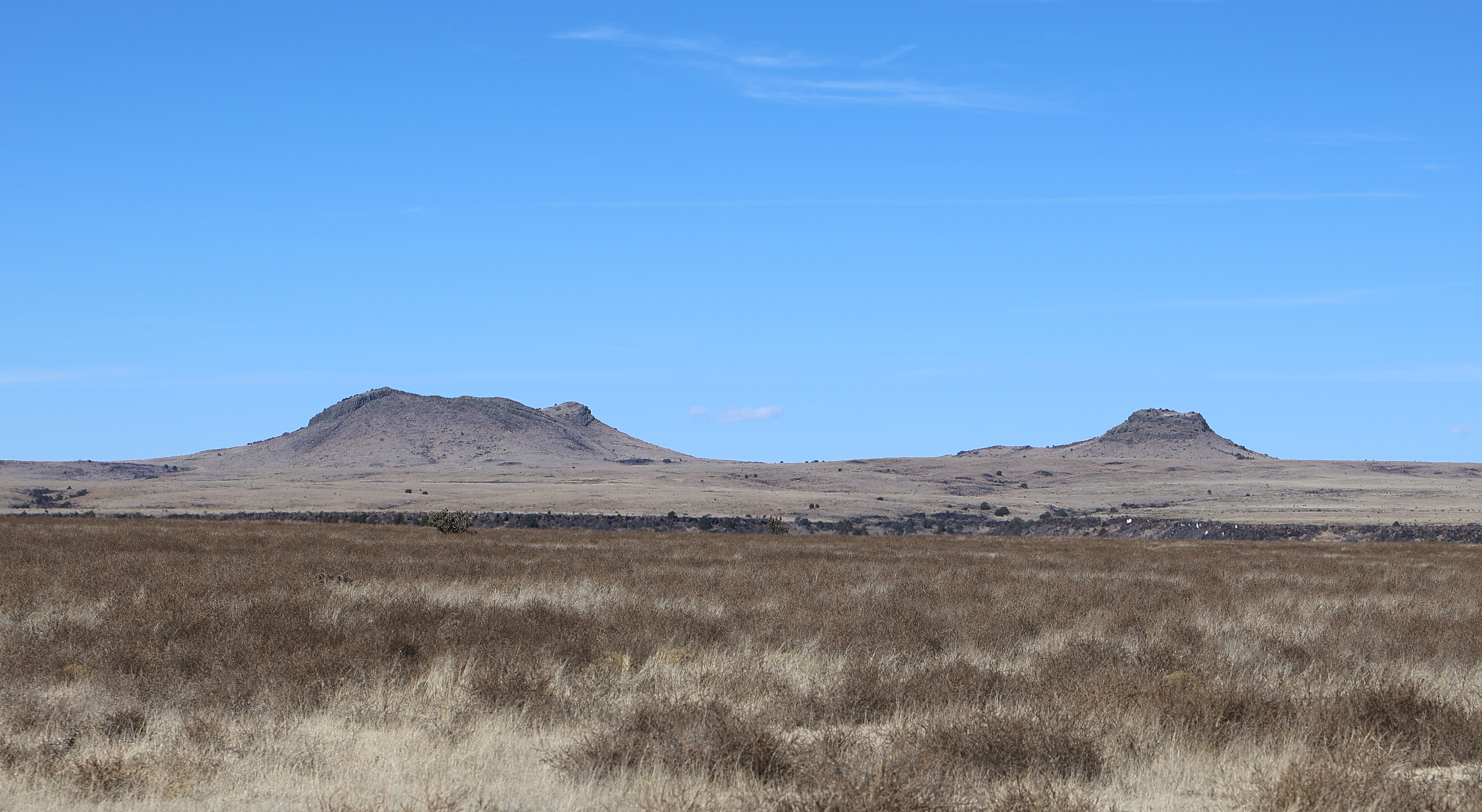
- Rabbit Ear Mountain (2026)

- Location within New Mexico Location within the United States
- Nearest city: Clayton, New Mexico
- Coordinates: 36°31′56.38″N 103°14′41.90″W
- Area: 15,250 acres (61.7 km^{2})
- NRHP reference No.: 66000499
- NMSRCP No.: 203

Significant dates
- Added to NRHP: October 15, 1966
- Designated NHLD: May 23, 1963
- Designated NMSRCP: November 6, 1970

Rabbit Ear Mountain is a mountain with two peaks in northeastern New Mexico, United States, 8 miles (13 kilometers) north of the city of Clayton. The mountain was a distinctive landmark along the Cimarron Cutoff of the Santa Fe Trail, a major route for westbound settlers in the 19th century. The mountain was designated a National Historic Landmark in 1963. The name is that of a Native American chief who was killed here in a battle with the Spanish in 1717.

In 1966, the National Park Service created a historic district called "Rabbit Ears" that includes the mountain. Also, the mountain was designated a National Historic Landmark under that name. According to the GNIS database, however, the mountain's official name is Rabbit Ear Mountain.

Rabbit Ear Mountain is really two summits that at one time formed a single volcano, but erosion over time has greatly changed the peak's landscape. The higher of the two peaks has an elevation of 6,062 feet (1,848 meters) and the lower, which is unnamed, has an elevation of 5,861 feet (1,786 meters). They rise several hundred feet above the surrounding Great Plains.

== Description ==
The Rabbit Ears are part of a formation known as the Clayton Complex, an area of elevated terrain north of Clayton and south of the New Mexico-Colorado state line. Its principal features are two peaks that are a regular presence on the landscape, especially when approached from the east. Rabbit Ear Mountain, which has two peaks, is located directly north of Clayton and is skirted to the south and west by New Mexico State Road 370. Mount Clayton lies to its west, south of the junction of U.S. Route 85 and New Mexico State Road 453. The Clayton Complex itself forms part of the Raton-Clayton volcanic field.

The Cimarron Cutoff of the Santa Fe Trail was one of two major branches of the Santa Fe Trail, a major 19th-century settlement route connecting Kansas City, Missouri and Santa Fe, New Mexico. Its route branched from the Mountain Route near Fort Dodge, roughly following the watershed of the Cimarron River into what is now northeastern New Mexico, where it then went southwesterly toward Santa Fe. The eastern portion of the route is roughly covered by present-day United States Route 56 and United States Route 412.

Rabbit Ear Mountain was a key landmark because it was a highly visible feature of the landscape for more than 30 miles (48 kilometers), and because it was one of the few signs of a sure water supply across that entire area. As a consequence, there are three areas that were regularly used as campsites by westbound travelers near the two mountains. McNees Crossing on Corrumpa Creek (or McNees Creek), Turkey Creek Camp on what is now called Alamos Creek, and Rabbit Ears Camp on Cienequilla Creek. Each of these creeks ran reliably in the spring and continued to provide water even after they stopped running fully. Camps would be located along their banks, their exact locations varying based on water availability. Remnant trail ruts are visible in each of these areas.

== See also ==
- Capulin Volcano National Monument
- Clayton, New Mexico
- National Register of Historic Places listings in Union County, New Mexico
- List of National Historic Landmarks in New Mexico
