= Beaver Dunes Park =

State park in Oklahoma, United States

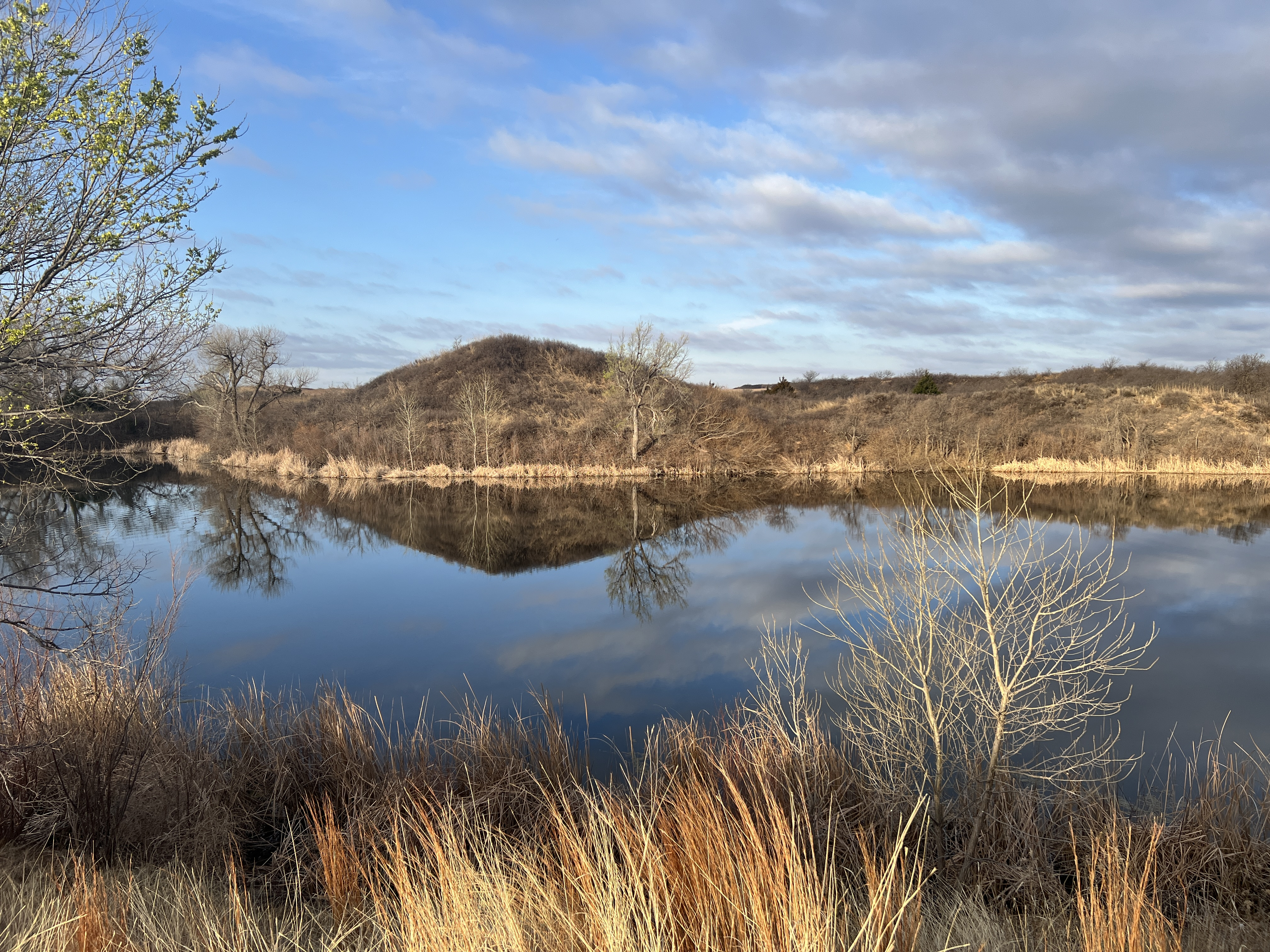
- Beaver Lake at Beaver Dunes Park

- Location within Oklahoma Location within the United States
- Location: Beaver County, Oklahoma, United States
- Nearest city: Beaver, OK
- Coordinates: 36.841111°N 100.516944°W
- Area: 520 acres (210 ha)
- Governing body: City of Beaver and Pioneer Parks
- Website: www.travelok.com/listings/view.profile/id.418

Beaver Dunes Park is in Beaver County, Oklahoma, near the city of Beaver. The 520-acre (2.1 km^{2}) park, located in the Oklahoma Panhandle, offers dune buggy riding on 300 acres (1.2 km^{2}) of sand hills, fishing, hiking trails, a playground and two campgrounds. Hackberry Bend Campground is located next to Beaver Lake, approximately 2 acres (8,100 m^{2}), stocked with largemouth bass, channel catfish, and perch, and has 7 RV sites and 10 tent sites. Also located in Hackberry Bend is a one-room primitive cabin which sleeps four and can be reserved. Pioneer Campground is located adjacent to the ORV area. This campground has 13 RV sites with direct access to the dunes. Both campgrounds have a comfort station with hot showers. Dump station located at Hackberry Bend Campground. Both campgrounds have handicap accessibility. Another area of the park is Big Sandy picnic area. This area has a sand volleyball court, basketball goal, horseshoe pits, playground, nature trail, and two reservable shelters.

The Oklahoma Panhandle is the driest part of the state, and is semi-arid (below 20 inches (51 cm) annual rainfall), a condition sometimes conducive in certain conditions to particulate matter formed by natural processes (such as erosion and deposition) remaining as loose sand and forming dunes instead of integrating with soil.

There are legends regarding strange occurrences at this place, going back to Spanish explorers. Coronado’s journal cites three of his men disappearing into flashes of green light while exploring the tract. There is a separate legend about the area being a UFO crash site. The location, which has been compared to the Bermuda Triangle, has been referred to as “Shaman’s Portal.”

The tract was once a state park. The State of Oklahoma announced in 2011 that the park would be closed at the end of Summer that year as a budget-cutting measure. Laurie Anderson of Beaver, Oklahoma protested to keep it open. The dunes were saved from closure shortly thereafter. On August 15, 2011, the park ownership was formally transferred to the City of Beaver.

== See also ==
- Beaver River
- Boiling Springs State Park
