= Fort Supply Lake =

- Location within Oklahoma Location within the United States
- Location: Woodward County, Oklahoma
- Coordinates: 36°31′55″N 99°34′15″W
- Type: Reservoir
- Primary inflows: Wolf Creek
- Primary outflows: Wolf Creek
- Managing agency: U.S. Army Corps of Engineers
- Built: 1938
- First flooded: 1942
- Surface area: 1,800 acres (730 ha)
- Water volume: 13,900 acre⋅ft (17.1 hm^{3})
- Shore length^{1}: 26 mi (42 km)
- Surface elevation: 2,400 ft (730 m)
- Settlements: Fort Supply, Oklahoma
- ^{1} Shore length is not a well-defined measure.

Fort Supply Lake is in Woodward County, Oklahoma, about 1 mile (1.6 km) south of Fort Supply and 12 miles (19 km) northwest of Woodward. Managed by the U.S. Army Corps of Engineers, the lake surface covers 1,800 acres (7.3 km^{2}). There are about 6,000 acres (24 km^{2}) of public hunting land managed by the Corps of Engineers and the Oklahoma Department of Wildlife Conservation adjacent to the lake.

The lake was created in 1942 by damming Wolf Creek, although the work actually began in 1938. The primary purposes of the lake are for flood control and conservational storage. Its normal elevation is 2,400 feet (730 m). The maximum volume of water is 13,900 acre-feet (17,100,000 m^{3}). The lake has 26 miles (42 km) of shoreline.

Recreational opportunities are readily available. Fishing is allowed and there are three handicap-accessible fishing piers in addition to shore fishing. Popular species include crappie, walleye, white bass, hybrid bass, channel catfish and flathead catfish.

The Corps of Engineers and the Oklahoma Department of Wildlife Conservation manage the adjacent hunting area. It is open year-round. Bobwhite quail and deer are the most popular species for hunters, but other species hunted include wild turkey, pheasant, dove, waterfowl, squirrel and rabbit.
