= William S. Key Correctional Center =

Former prison in Oklahoma, United States

Coordinates: 36°34′18″N 99°33′21″W

- Interactive map of William S. Key Correctional Center
- Location: 1 William S. Key Blvd Fort Supply, Oklahoma
- Status: minimum
- Capacity: 1087
- Opened: 1988
- Closed: 2021
- Managed by: Oklahoma Department of Corrections

William S. Key Correctional Center was a minimum-security state prison for men located in Fort Supply, Woodward County, Oklahoma, owned and operated by the Oklahoma Department of Corrections.

The facility was opened in 1989 and has a capacity of 1087 inmates held at minimum security. It was named after Warden of Oklahoma State Penitentiary and Major general William S. Key.
