= Seneca Creek (New Mexico/Oklahoma) =

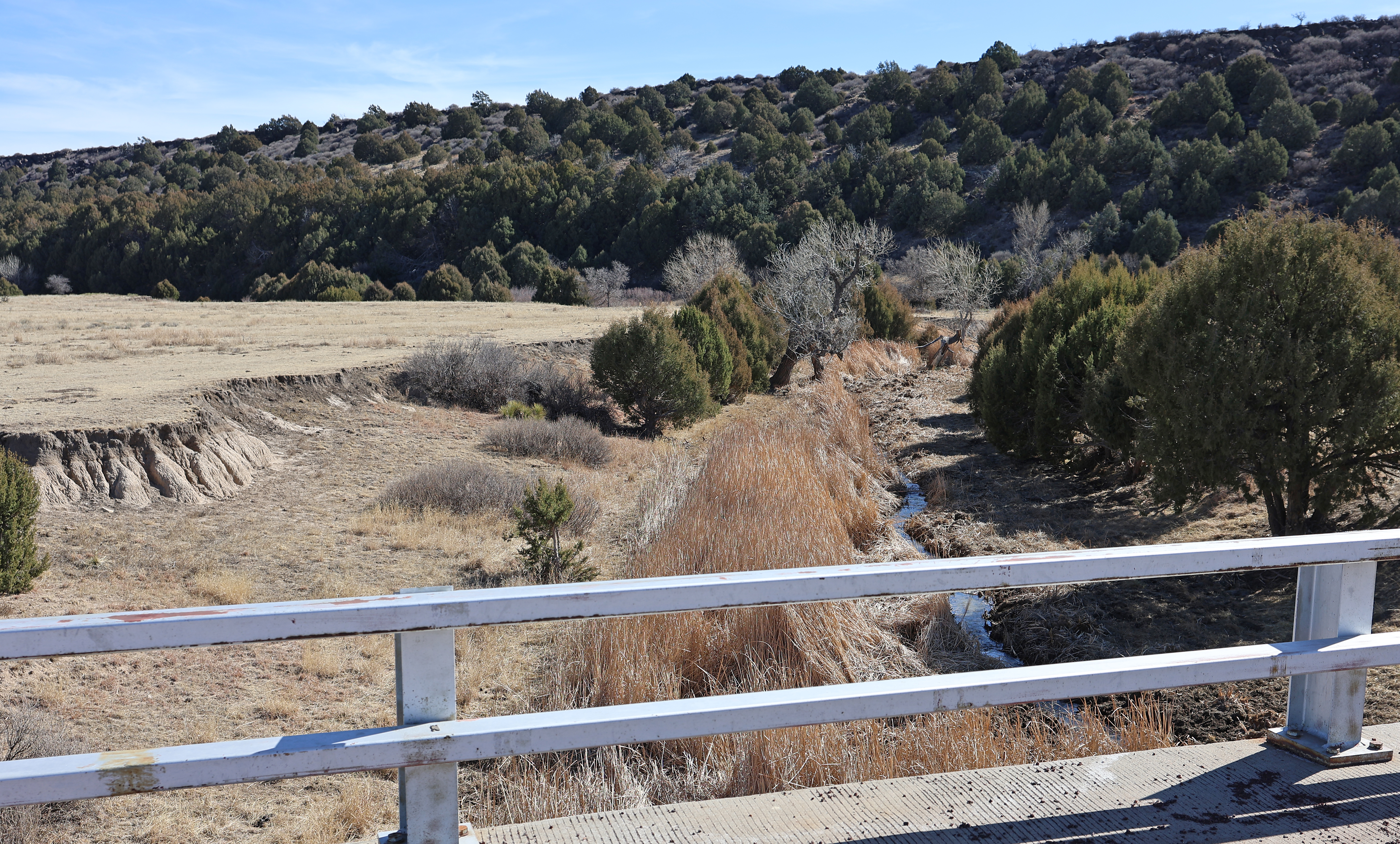
- The creek viewed from a bridge carrying New Mexico State Road 370 over the creek

Location
- Country: United States

Physical characteristics
- Source
  - location: South-southeast of Des Moines, New Mexico
- Mouth
  - location: Northwest of Felt, Oklahoma
  - coordinates: 36°35′52″N 102°52′02″W

Basin features
- Progression: Beaver River → North Canadian River → Canadian River → Arkansas → Mississippi

Seneca Creek, also known as Cienequilla Creek, is a watercourse in New Mexico and Oklahoma. Running south of, and roughly parallel to, Corrumpa Creek, it originates south-southeast of Des Moines, New Mexico and east-northeast of Grenville, and travels generally east, eventually crossing into Oklahoma. Where it finally joins Corrumpa Creek about 4.5 miles (7.2 km) northwest of Felt, Oklahoma, the combined stream becomes the Beaver River.

Seneca Creek is impounded at Clayton Lake, part of New Mexico's Clayton Lake State Park and Dinosaur Trackways, about 13 miles northwest of Clayton, New Mexico. The lake, with 170 surface acres at capacity, was established in 1955 specifically as a recreational site by the State Game and Fish Commission. In the May to September timeframe it offers boating and fishing for rainbow trout, walleye pike, crappie, bluegills, bullheads, large-mouth bass, and channel catfish, while the rest of the year the lake is a refuge for waterfowl. The associated park features camping, hiking trails, and other amenities, as well as having one of the most extensive dinosaur trackways in North America.

== See also ==
- List of rivers of New Mexico
- List of rivers of Oklahoma
