= Horseshoe Crater =

Volcanic crater in New Mexico, USA

Coordinates: 36°41′0″N 104°2′0″W

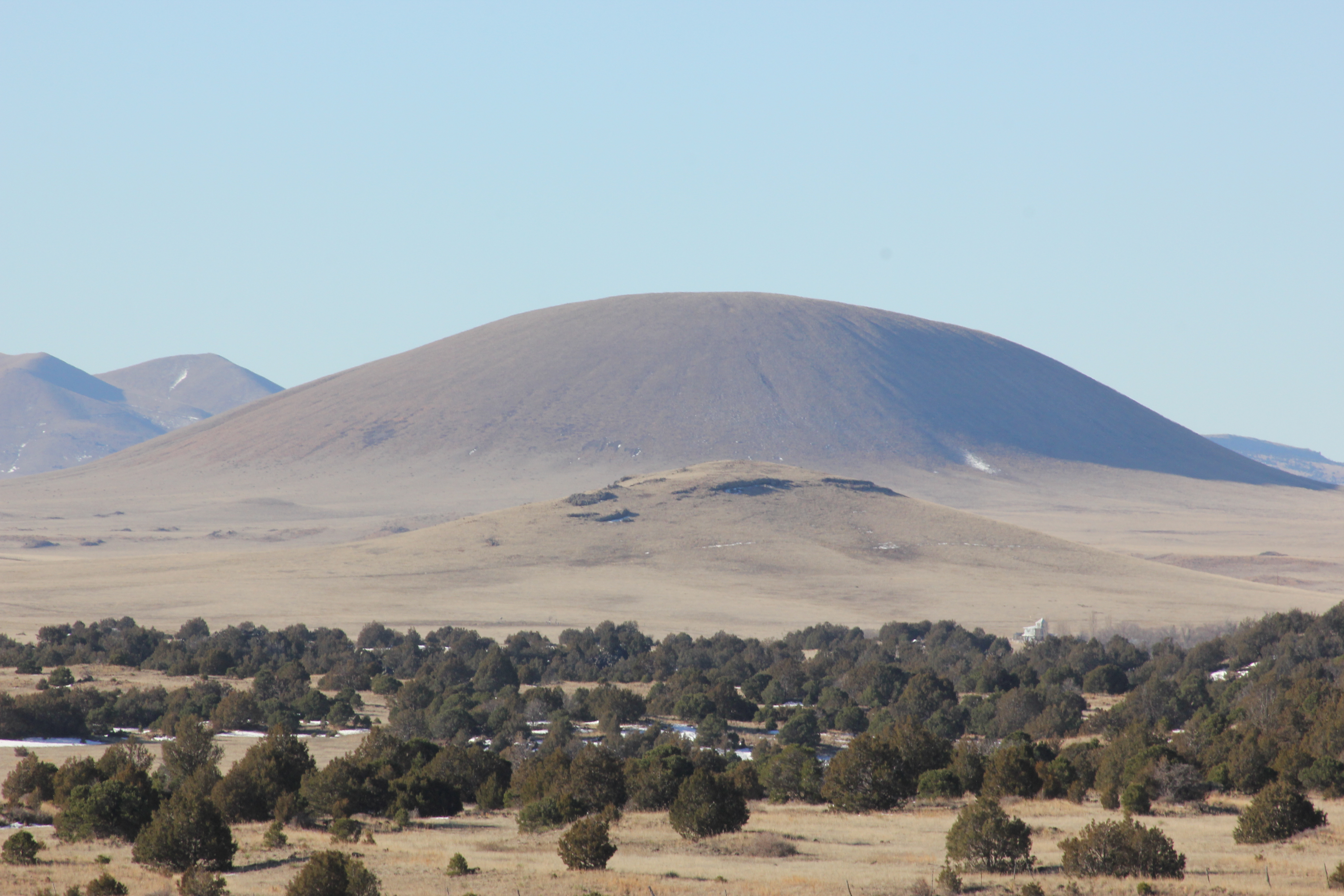
Horseshoe Crater volcano in the desert.

Horseshoe Crater is a cinder cone volcanic crater in Colfax County, New Mexico, United States. It is located southeast of the Capulin Volcano National Monument and in the Raton-Clayton volcanic field.

== History ==
=== Geology ===
Horseshoe Crater was most likely created due to a volcanic depression or meteorite explosion. The name comes from the U-shaped crater in the volcano that reaches the ground. There are no new reports of activity inside the volcano and it's highly likely there won't be ever again. Horseshoe Crater is 440,000 years old, much older than the Capulin volcano. Horseshoe has lost its cinder cone profile and became rounder due to erosion, and its original height was significantly cut down.

=== Comparison to Capulin ===
Name	Height	Age	Type	Class
Horseshoe crater	7772 ft	440,000 years old	Cinder cone	Extinct
Capulin	8182 ft	56,000 years old	Cinder cone	Extinct

== Surrounding areas ==
The closest town to Horseshoe Crater is the small settlement of Capulin. This volcano and the surrounding ones in the volcanic field pose no threat to the population as they have all gone extinct.

== See also ==
- List of volcanoes in the United States
- List of impact structures on Earth
