= Optima National Wildlife Refuge =

Wildlife Refuge in Oklahoma

- IUCN category IV (habitat/species management area)
- Location within the United States
- Location: Texas County, Oklahoma, United States
- Nearest city: Hardesty, Oklahoma
- Coordinates: 36°38′43″N 101°12′31″W
- Area: 4,333 acres (17.54 km^{2})
- Established: 1975
- Governing body: U.S. Fish and Wildlife Service
- Website: Optima National Wildlife Refuge

Located in the middle of the Oklahoma panhandle, the 4,333-acre (17.54 km^{2}) Optima National Wildlife Refuge is made up of grasslands and wooded bottomland on the Coldwater Creek arm of the Optima Lake project.

The 8,062-acre Optima Wildlife Management Area, an Oklahoma state-managed hunting area, sits adjacent on the Beaver River arm of the Optima Lake project.
