= Hardesty, Oklahoma =

- Town
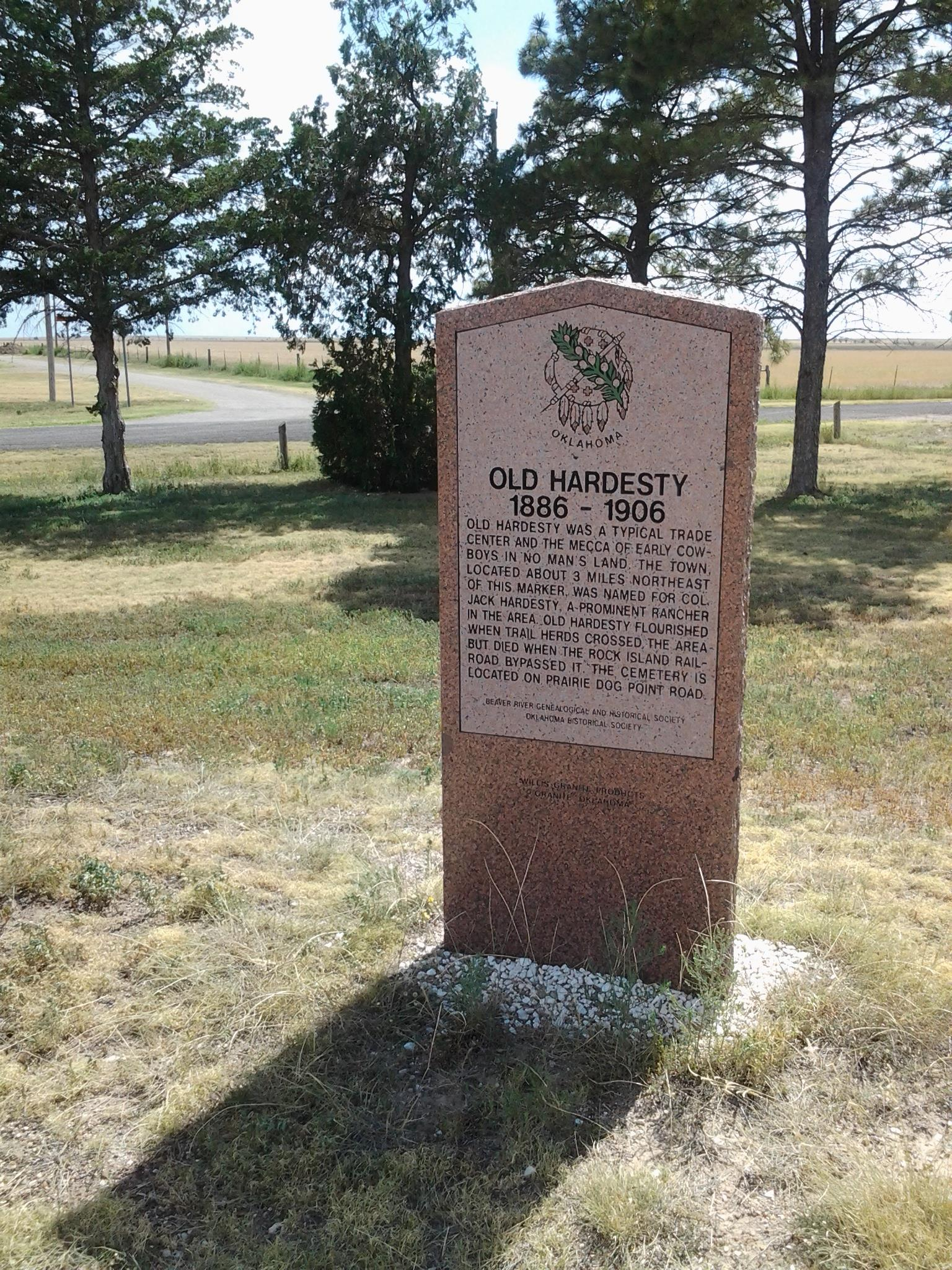
- Historic marker on the western edge of Hardesty

- Location in Texas County and state of Oklahoma.
- Coordinates: 36°36′59″N 101°11′27″W
- Country: United States
- State: Oklahoma
- County: Texas

Area
  - Total: 0.22 sq mi (0.58 km^{2})
  - Land: 0.22 sq mi (0.58 km^{2})
  - Water: 0 sq mi (0.00 km^{2})
- Elevation: 2,907 ft (886 m)

Population (2020)
  - Total: 205
  - Density: 912.2/sq mi (352.22/km^{2})
- Time zone: UTC-6 (Central (CST))
  - Summer (DST): UTC-5 (CDT)
- ZIP code: 73944
- Area code: 580
- FIPS code: 40-32550
- GNIS feature ID: 1093528
- Website: hardestyok.com

Hardesty is a town in Texas County, Oklahoma, United States. As of the 2020 census, the town’s population was 205.

== History ==
The original Hardesty was four miles northeast of the present community. It had a post office in 1887, with the name honoring A.J. "Jack" Hardesty, who had interests in the area. However, the Rock Island railroad bypassed the town in 1901 and created the locale that became Guymon, Oklahoma. Most of Hardesty’s residents and businesses relocated to Guymon, and the original town withered.

When a second Rock Island line later came through the county near the old Hardesty in 1929, a new community along the route was named Hardesty at the insistence of locals. However, growth of the new Hardesty was stunted by the Great Depression and the Dust Bowl. The town nevertheless incorporated in 1947 and remains in place, complete with a post office and a school district covering 250 square miles.

== Geography ==
Hardesty is just south of the Coldwater Creek arm of the Optima Lake project, including Optima National Wildlife Refuge, and the Optima Wildlife Management Area public hunting lands managed by the Oklahoma Department of Wildlife Conservation. The town is approximately 28 kilometers or 18 miles southeast of Guymon along Oklahoma State Highway 3, which runs concurrently with U.S. Route 412 through Hardesty.

== Demographics ==
Historical population
Census	Pop.	Note	%±
1950	201		—
1960	187		−7.0%
1970	223		19.3%
1980	243		9.0%
1990	228		−6.2%
2000	277		21.5%
2010	212		−23.5%
2020	205		−3.3%
U.S. Decennial Census

=== 2020 census ===
As of the 2020 census, Hardesty had a population of 205. The median age was 31.8 years. 30.2% of residents were under the age of 18 and 8.3% of residents were 65 years of age or older. For every 100 females there were 113.5 males, and for every 100 females age 18 and over there were 98.6 males age 18 and over.

0.0% of residents lived in urban areas, while 100.0% lived in rural areas.

There were 75 households in Hardesty, of which 38.7% had children under the age of 18 living in them. Of all households, 37.3% were married-couple households, 21.3% were households with a male householder and no spouse or partner present, and 38.7% were households with a female householder and no spouse or partner present. About 20.0% of all households were made up of individuals and 8.0% had someone living alone who was 65 years of age or older.

There were 92 housing units, of which 18.5% were vacant. The homeowner vacancy rate was 10.6% and the rental vacancy rate was 5.6%.

Racial composition as of the 2020 census
Race	Number	Percent
White	106	51.7%
Black or African American	0	0.0%
American Indian and Alaska Native	0	0.0%
Asian	1	0.5%
Native Hawaiian and Other Pacific Islander	0	0.0%
Some other race	37	18.0%
Two or more races	61	29.8%
Hispanic or Latino (of any race)	113	55.1%

== Education ==
It is in the Hardesty Public School District.
