= Des Moines, New Mexico =

- Village
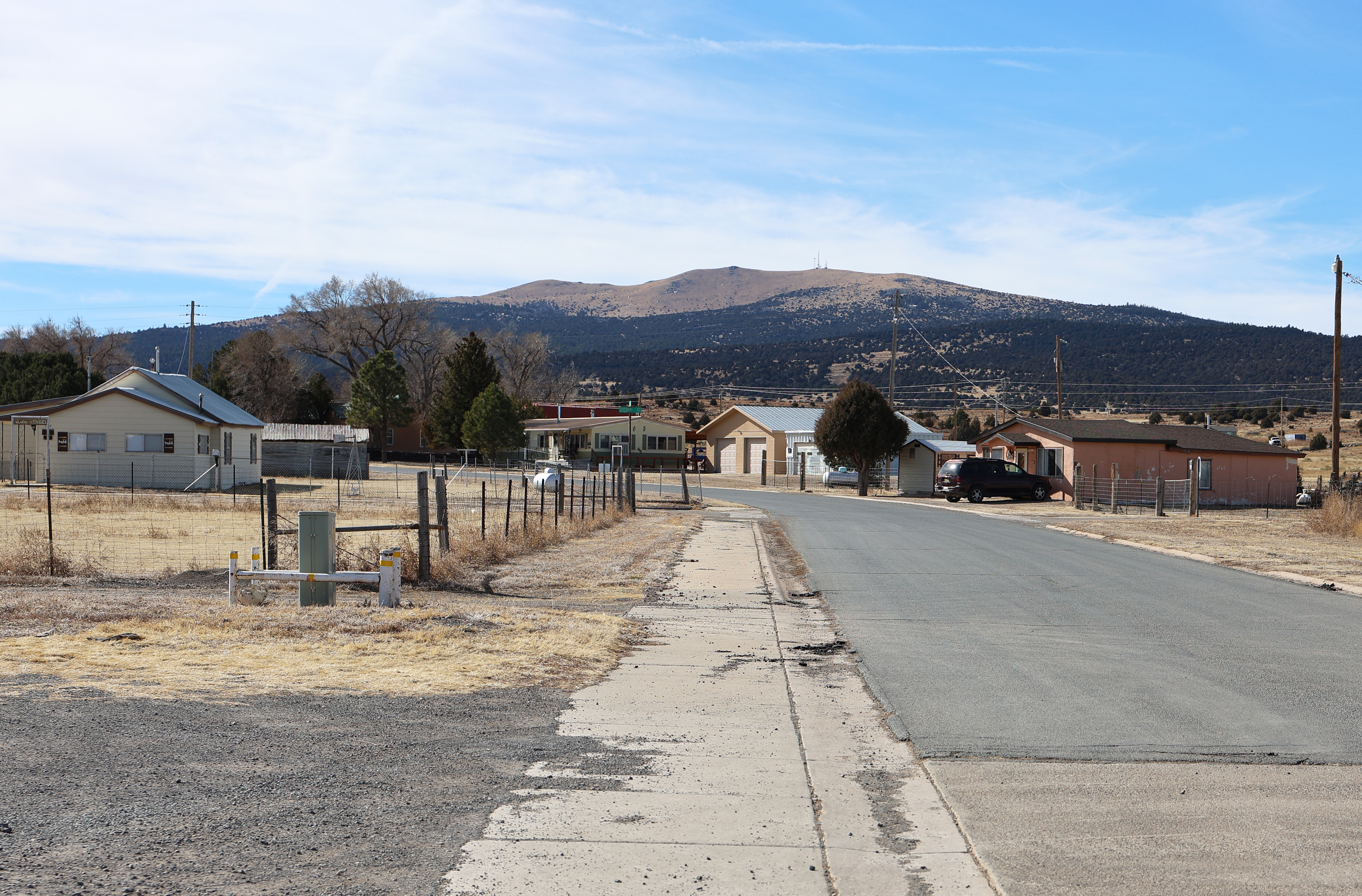
- Looking southwest along Olive Avenue towards Sierra Grande

- Location of Des Moines, New Mexico

- Location in the United States
- Coordinates: 36°45′41″N 103°50′03″W
- Country: United States
- State: New Mexico
- County: Union
- Named for: Des Moines, Iowa

Area
  - Total: 0.87 sq mi (2.25 km^{2})
  - Land: 0.87 sq mi (2.25 km^{2})
  - Water: 0 sq mi (0.00 km^{2})
- Elevation: 6,634 ft (2,022 m)

Population (2020)
  - Total: 117
  - Density: 130/sq mi (52/km^{2})
- Time zone: UTC-7 (Mountain (MST))
  - Summer (DST): UTC-6 (MDT)
- ZIP code: 88418
- Area code: 575
- FIPS code: 35-20480
- GNIS feature ID: 2413546

Des Moines ("Dez Moynz") is a village in Union County, New Mexico, United States. The population was 117 in the 2020 census. The population has been declining since its peak in about 1920. Des Moines is a small village surrounded by large cattle ranches. Inactive volcanoes dot the region.

== History ==
In 1887-88, the Colorado and Southern Railroad built a line and established a station they named Des Moines after Des Moines, Iowa. The St. Louis, Rocky Mountain & Pacific Railway arrived in 1907.

A post office has been in operation since 1906. In 1907, two settlement sites were surveyed. One retained the name Des Moines, and the other Saavedra after its founder. Initially, Saavedra was the more populous of the two places; however, the combined settlement was called Des Moines. Des Moines initially consisted mostly of hastily constructed shacks. The maximum population of 800 was reached in 1920, but drought and the Great Depression caused a quick decline.

== Geography ==
According to the United States Census Bureau, the village has a total area of 1.1 square miles (2.8 km^{2}), all land.

The summit of Sierra Grande, elevation 8,723 ft (2,659 m) (the largest shield volcano in the Raton-Clayton Volcanic Field) is 5 kilometres (3.1 miles) southwest of the village. Twin Mountain, 6,581 ft (2,006 m) in elevation and 4 miles (6.4 km) north of Des Moines, is also volcanic in origin and has been a source of construction material.

== Demographics ==
Historical population
Census	Pop.	Note	%±
1920	800		—
1930	362		−54.7%
1940	289		−20.2%
1950	282		−2.4%
1960	207		−26.6%
1970	204		−1.4%
1980	178		−12.7%
1990	168		−5.6%
2000	177		5.4%
2010	143		−19.2%
2020	117		−18.2%
U.S. Decennial Census

As of the census of 2000, there were 143 people, 72 households, and 37 families residing in the village. The racial makeup of the village was 88.1% White (65.7% non-Hispanic white), 1.4% Native American, 7.0% from other races, and 3.5% from two or more races. Hispanic or Latino of any race were 30.8% of the population.

As of the 2000 census There were 72 households, out of which 36.1% had children under the age of 18 living with them, 52.8% were married couples living together, 8.3% had a female householder with no husband present, and 30.6% were non-families. 29.2% of all households were made up of individuals, and 12.5% had someone living alone who was 65 years of age or older. The average household size was 2.46 and the average family size was 3.00.

In the village, the population was spread out, with 30.5% under the age of 18, 5.6% from 18 to 24, 27.1% from 25 to 44, 23.7% from 45 to 64, and 13.0% who were 65 years of age or older. The median age was 38 years. For every 100 females, there were 78.8 males. For every 100 females age 18 and over, there were 95.2 males.

The median income for a household in the village was $27,321, and the median income for a family was $40,833. Males had a median income of $21,042 versus $33,750 for females. The per capita income for the village was $16,255. About 25.6% of families and 31.6% of the population were below the poverty line, including 49.3% of those under the age of eighteen and 26.9% of those 65 or over.
