= Capulin Volcano National Monument =

U.S. National Monument in New Mexico

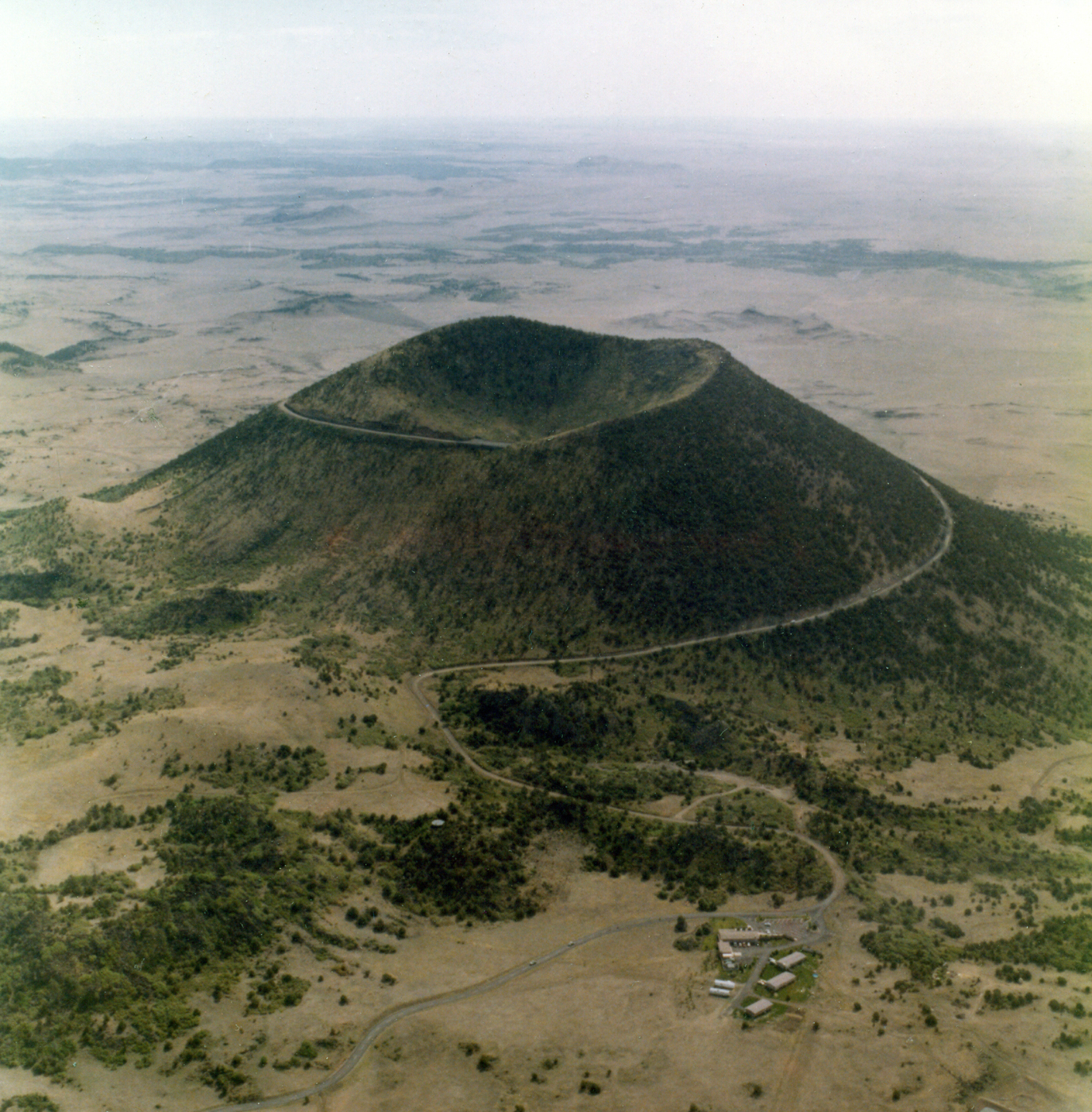
- Last erupted between 56,000 to 62,000 years ago

- Location within New Mexico Location within the United States
- Interactive map of Capulin Volcano National Monument
- Location: Raton-Clayton Volcanic Field, Union County, New Mexico, New Mexico, United States
- Coordinates: 36°46′56″N 103°58′12″W
- Area: 793 acres (321 ha)
- Elevation: 2,494 m (8,182 ft)
- Max. elevation: 8,182
- Authorized: August 9, 1916
- Visitors: 89,489 (in 2025)
- Governing body: Department of the Interior
- Operator: National Park Service
- Website: Capulin Volcano National Monument

Capulin Volcano National Monument is a U.S. National Monument located in northeastern New Mexico, 30 miles (48 km) east of Raton. It encompasses around 800 acres (320 ha) of land that includes an extinct cinder cone volcano and is part of the Raton-Clayton volcanic field. The volcano and surrounding area was established as a national monument by president Woodrow Wilson in 1916.

== Geology ==
=== Geological history ===
The Capulin Volcano lies within the 8,000 square miles (21,000 km^{2}) of the Raton-Clayton Volcanic Field (RCVF). Volcanic eruptions started around 9 million years ago and continued intermittently until around 37,000 years ago. The field itself is between the cities of Raton and Clayton, which it derivies its name from.

Advanced dating techniques from the mid-1990s estimate the eruption of Capulin occurred approximately 60,000 years ago over the course of several weeks to several years. More precise argon-argon dating placed the age of eruption at around 54,200 ±1,800 years before present.

During the eruption, the cone reached a height of 500 metres (1,600 ft) from intermittent and discrete Strombolian bursts. Winds from the Southwest to West caused more materials to accumulate on the east flank, making the cone asymmetrical. Lava afterwards flowed around the weak spot of the base or "boca" (Spanish for mouth), spreading over more than 15 square miles (39 km^{2}) rather than flowing out the crater of the cinder cone. Vegetation quickly grew after the lava stopped, which helped preserve the original look of the volcano.

=== Geologic Features ===
The crater has a diameter around 1,450 feet (440 m), with a base circumference of 4 miles (6.4 km) and a maximum depth at 415 feet (126 m). Around 100 feet (30 m) of erosion has occurred since the eruption ended. Spatter deposits are sprinkled around the base of the volcano in addition to prominent pressure ridges. The rim of the volcano is asymmetrical, with the west side lower than the east side.

== Designation as National Monument ==
The land surrounding Capulin was heavily used for resource exploitation. In December 1890, Inspector W.D. Harlan visited the site and wrote a letter to the General Land Office which read:

“Prof. Dana of Yale College, who is regarded as the best authority in this country on Volcanoes says that “Capulin” is the most perfect specimen of extinct Volcanoes in North America.”

With the endorsement of the Secretary of the Interior, John Willock Noble, the US withdrew from “settlement, entry or other disposition under any of the public land laws until such time as Congress may see fit,” as quoted from the General Land Office.

Later on August 9, 1916, President Woodrow Wilson declared Capulin as a National Monument a decade after the Antiquities Act. A week afterwards, Wilson established the National Park Service which has administered the park ever since.

The 87th Congress passed a law to amend a procolamation to "…preserve the scenic and scientific integrity of Capulin Mountain National Monument…" in 1962.

In 1987, Congress changed “Capulin Mountain National Monument” to “Capulin Volcano National Monument,”.

On December 19, 2025, the site was added to the National Register of Historic Places

== Ecology ==
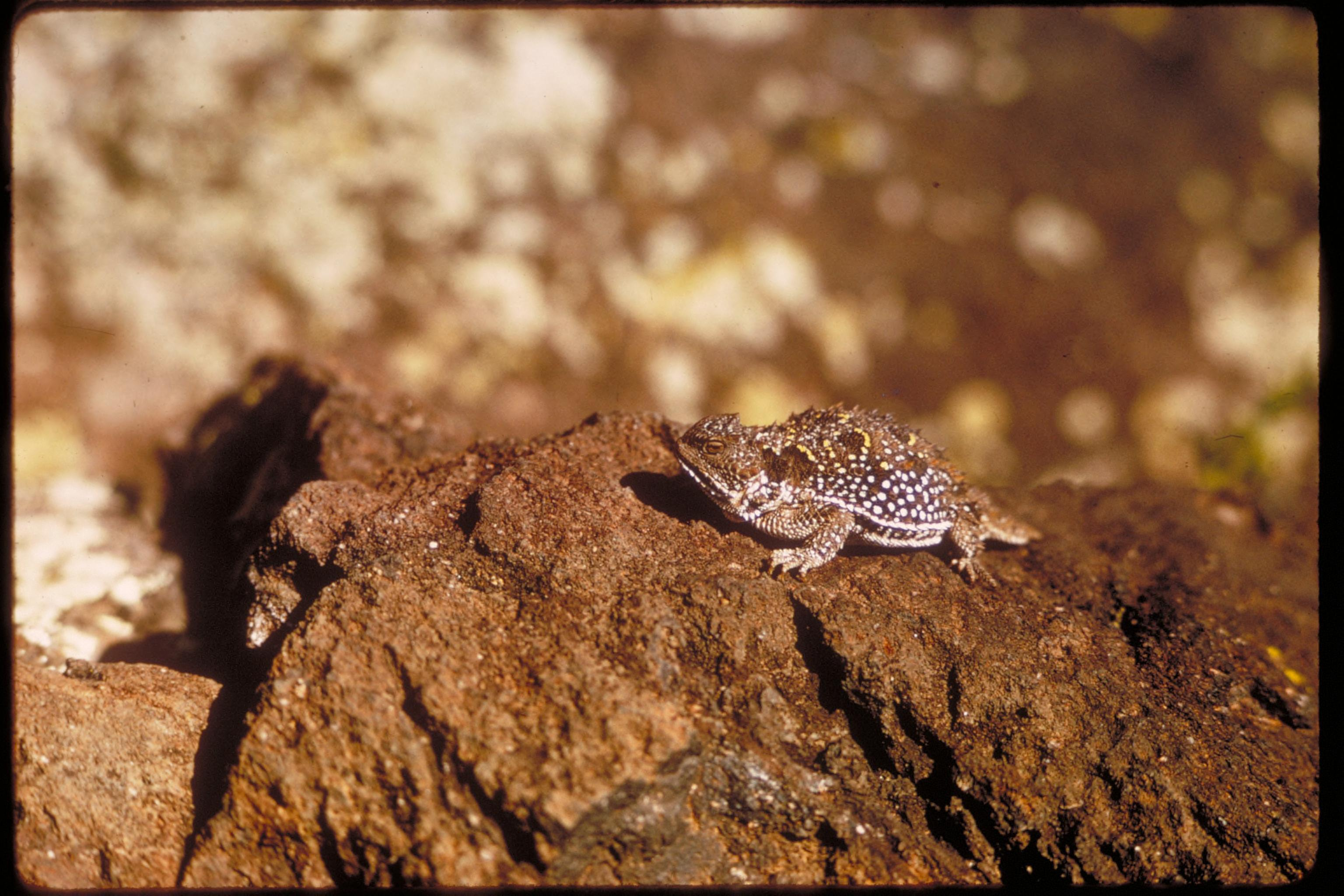
Horned toad at Capulin Volcano National Monument

The vegetation around Capulin Volcano are a part of the pinyon-juniper woodland, with tree species including pinyon pines, juniper trees ponderosa pines, Rocky Mountain juniper, Gambel oak, quaking aspens and chokecherry. The last one being primarily important due to its Spanish name, Capulin, being used to name the volcano. The surrounding area also include a number of animals like mountain lions, bobcats, American black bears, mule deers, and wild turkeys.

Notable endemic species which reside around the volcano includes the Capulin Alberta Arctic Butterfly, which was found around the rim of the volcano in 1969. An endemic plant, the Capulin Goldenrod was also found in 1930 and was identified as a new species found in 1936.

== Gallery ==
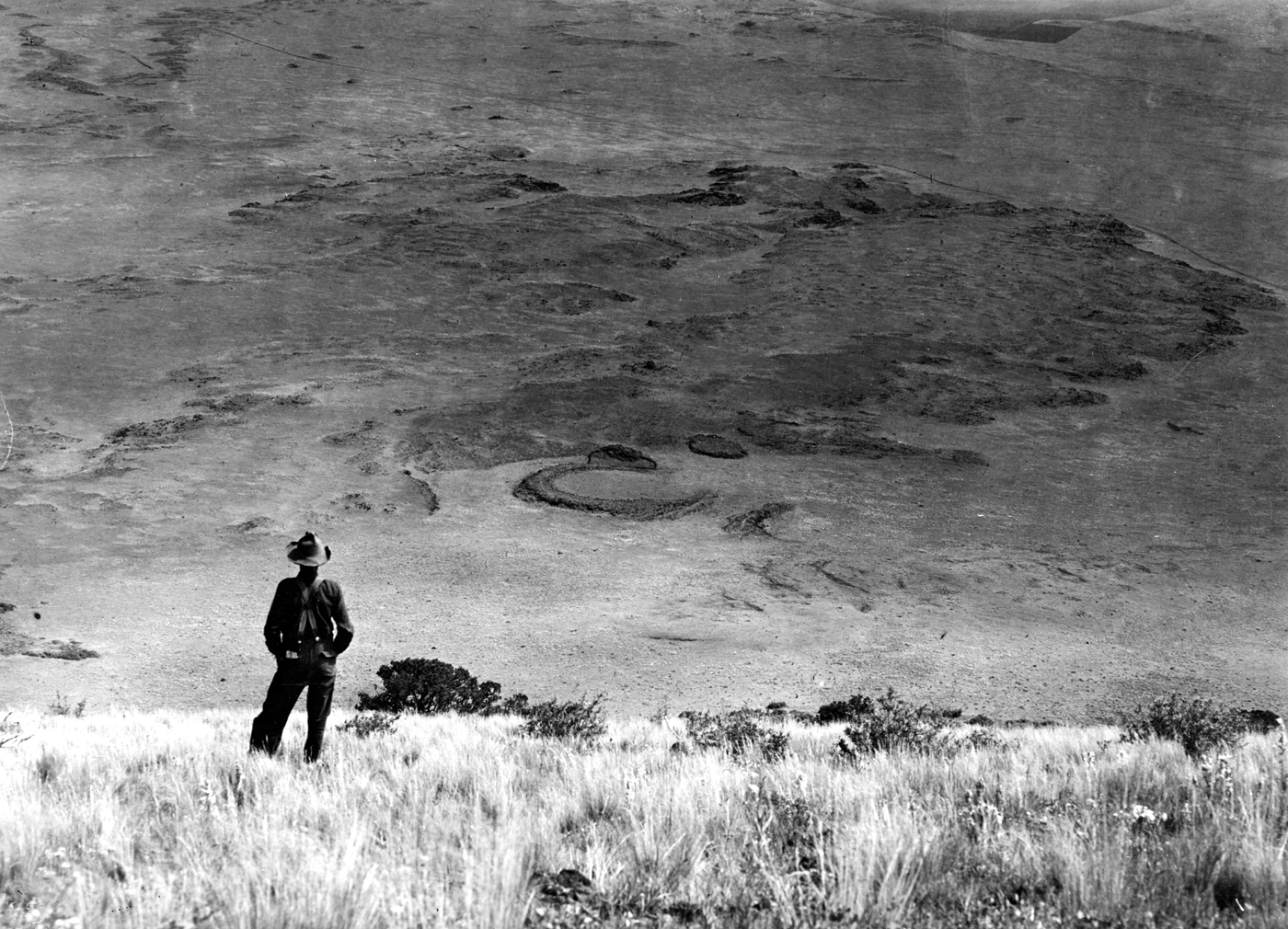
Congealed lava flows, viewed from the top of Capulin Volcano (1909)

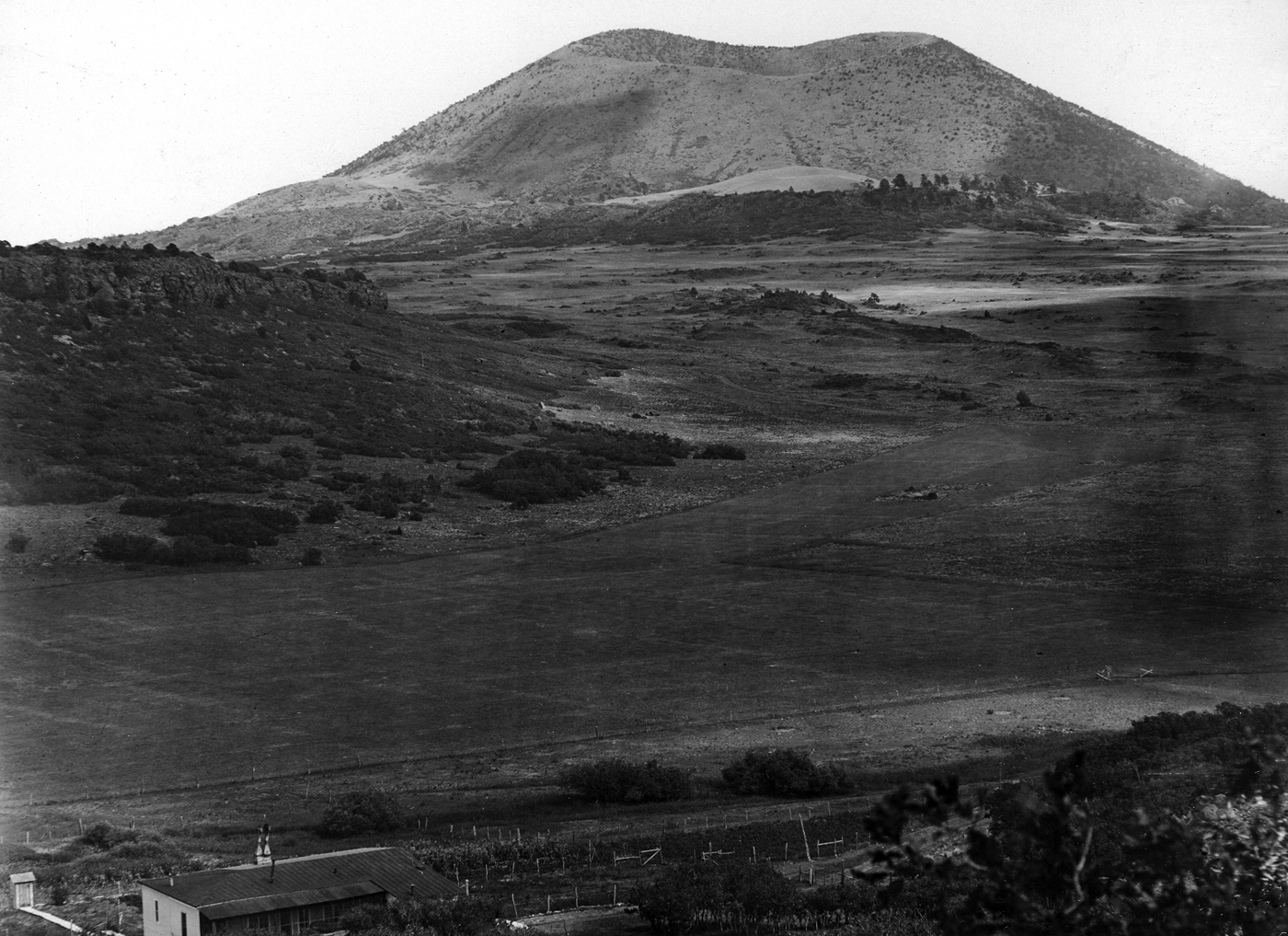
Capulin Volcano, viewed from the west (1916)

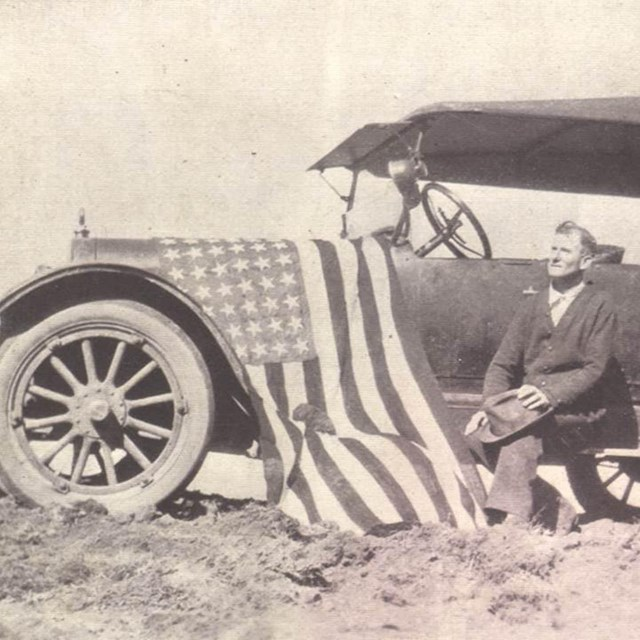
Homer Farr after the completion of the road (1925)

== See also ==
- Black Mesa (Oklahoma)
- Eastern New Mexico
- Horseshoe Crater, a cinder cone volcanic crater in the Raton-Clayton volcanic field
- Johnson Mesa
- List of national monuments of the United States
- Sierra Grande
