= Capulin Peak =

Landform in Rio Arriba County, New Mexico

Coordinates: 36°14′41″N 106°46′02″W

Capulin Peak is a summit in Rio Arriba County, New Mexico. It reaches an elevation of 9,199 feet / 2,804 meters. Its name in the Tewa language of the nearby Puebloan peoples is Ávéh Pʼin, meaning choke cherry mountain. Its Spanish name is Cerro Capulin, meaning the same. The Armijo Route of the Old Spanish Trail ran westward at the foot of the peak at its south. This route is now closely followed or paralleled by New Mexico, New Mexico State Road 96.
