= Raton-Clayton volcanic field =

Volcanic field in New Mexico, United States

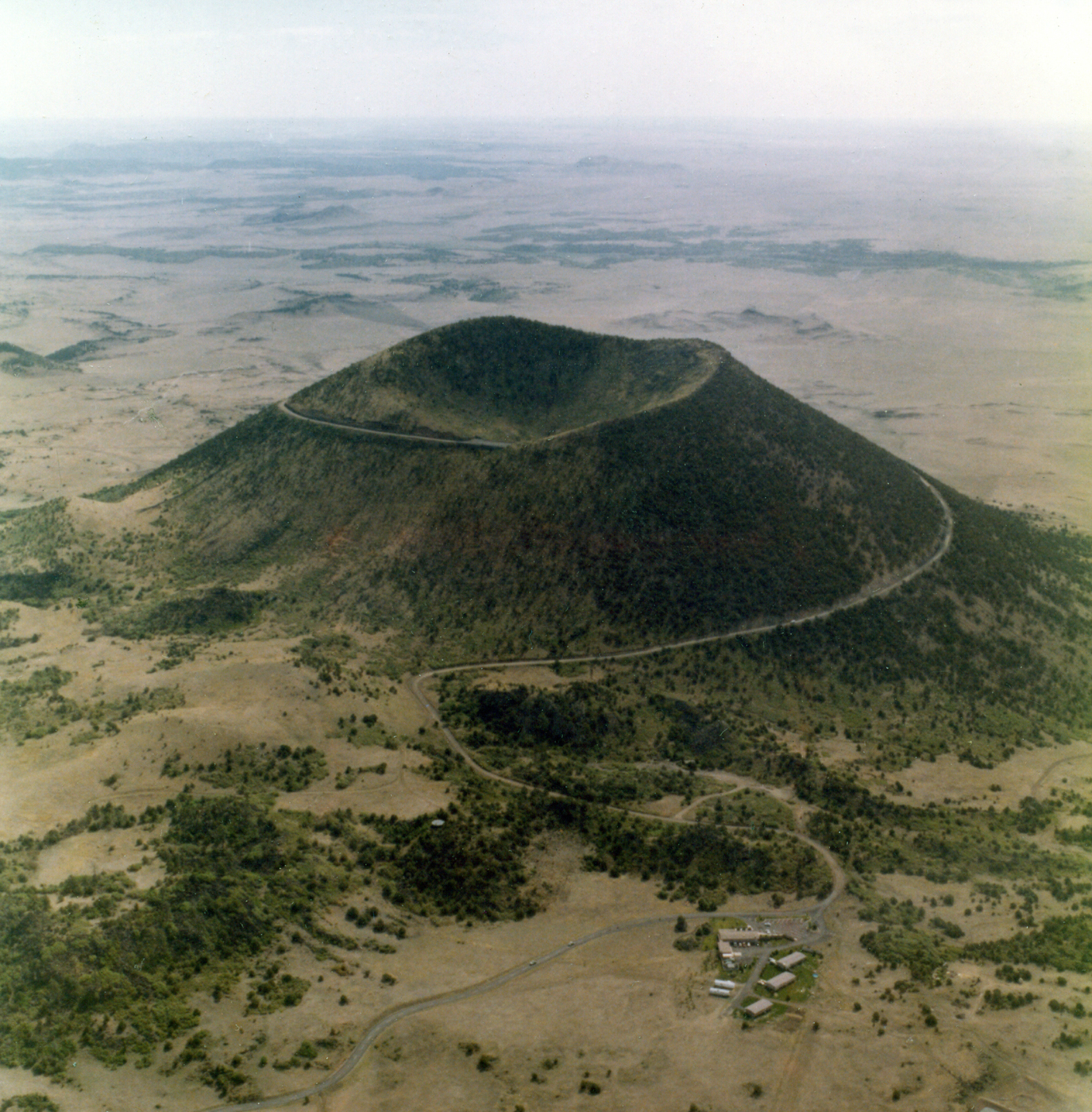
- Capulin Volcano

Highest point
- Elevation: 1,550 to 2,700 meters (5,090 to 8,860 ft)
- Coordinates: 36.5°N 104.3°W

Dimensions
- Area: 20,000 square kilometres (7,700 sq mi)

Geography
- Location: New Mexico, US
- Topo map: USGS Folsom

Geology
- Rock age: Miocene-to-Pleistocene
- Mountain type: Volcanic field
- Volcanic zone: Rio Grande Rift
- Last eruption: 58,000 to 62,000 years ago

The Raton-Clayton volcanic field is a volcanic field located in the state of New Mexico, United States. Capulin Volcano National Monument is located in the volcanic field. It is the northeasternmost volcanic field of the Jemez Lineament and the easternmost volcanic area of the United States that isn't considered extinct.

== Geologic setting ==
The Raton-Clayton volcanic field is located at the northeastern end of the Jemez Lineament. This is a zone of crustal weakness, possibly corresponding to a boundary between ancient crustal provinces. The region also sits above the eastern end of the Alvarado Ridge, an enormous uplift reaching from the Colorado Plateau to the western High Plains. This is an area underlain by buoyant mantle that is welling up and melting as it decompresses.

Magma rising from the mantle has found a path to the surface through the Jemez Lineament, and produced a cluster of about 125 cinder cones, domes, volcanic necks, and a single shield volcano, Sierra Grande. Volcanism began about 7.2 million years ago, and the most recent eruption was about 60,000 years ago, at Capulin Peak. Prolonged volcanism has added melted lower crust to the original basaltic magma to produce andesite, such as that of Sierra Grande, and dacite, erupted as domes such as Red Mountain.

=== Phases of volcanism ===
Volcanic activity in the field has been divided into three phases. The Raton phase took place 9.1 to 3.6 million years ago and produced mostly olivine basalt. This caps numerous mesas in the area. A smaller volume of silica-rich Red Mountain dacite was also erupted toward the end of this phase. The Raton phase was followed by the Clayton phase, which took place 3.6 to 2.0 million years ago. This began in the eastern part of the field, where Clayton-phase flows sit directly on Raton-phase flows. Further west, there was a significant period of erosion between the two phases. The Clayton-phase magma was more alkaline and produced basalts containing characteristic feldspathoid minerals. The final Capulin phase began less than two million years ago, and erupted alkaline lava that is remarkably uniform in composition, with the exception of one flow from Baby Capulin. This suggests the Capulin eruptions were all from the same magma chamber.

Sierra Grande, the largest volcano in the field, was active during both the Raton and Clayton phases, with flows ranging in age from 3.8 to 2.6 million years. The volcano is largely composed of two-pyroxene andesite, a rock type found almost nowhere else in the Raton-Clayton volcanic field.

== Notable vents ==
Name	Elevation		Location	Last eruption
Name	meters	feet	Coordinates	Last eruption
Baby Capulin	2,094	6,870	36°48′55″N 103°56′10″W	44.8 ± 2.2 ka
Capulin	2,494	8,182	36°46′57″N 103°58′11″W	54.2 ± 1.8 ka
Robinson Mountain	2,452	8,045	-	
Sierra Grande	2,658	8,720	36°42′20″N 103°52′34″W	about 2 Ma

== See also ==
- Horseshoe Crater, a cinder cone volcanic crater in the Raton-Clayton volcanic field
- List of volcanoes in the United States
