= Fort Supply, Oklahoma =

- Town
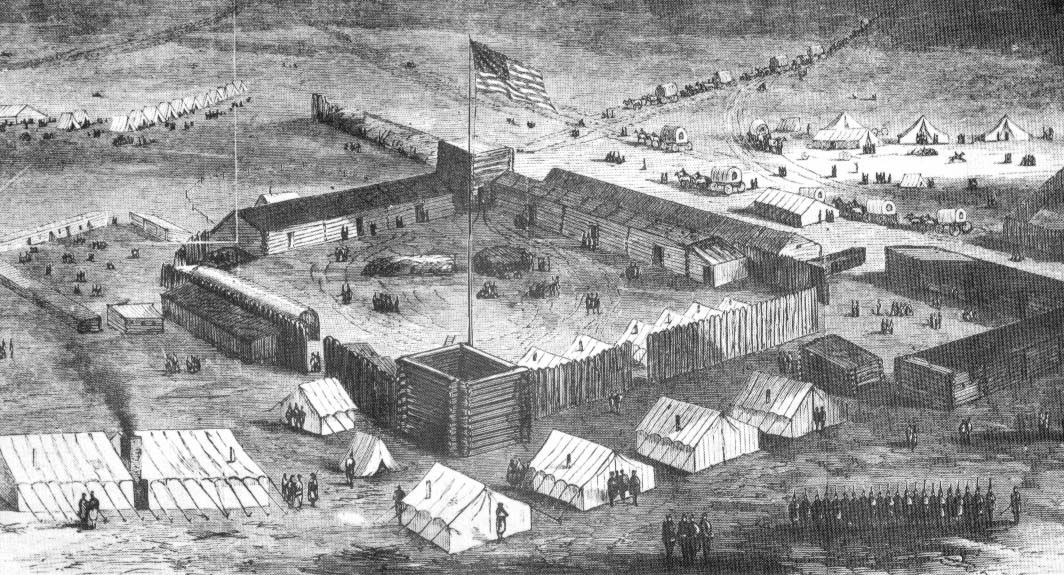
- Artists Rendition of Fort Supply, 1869

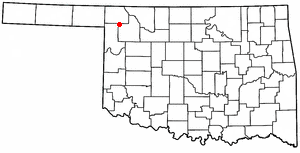
- Location of Fort Supply, Oklahoma
- Coordinates: 36°34′20″N 99°34′25″W
- Country: United States
- State: Oklahoma
- County: Woodward

Area
  - Total: 0.22 sq mi (0.56 km^{2})
  - Land: 0.22 sq mi (0.56 km^{2})
  - Water: 0 sq mi (0.00 km^{2})
- Elevation: 2,001 ft (610 m)

Population (2020)
  - Total: 317
  - Density: 1,474.2/sq mi (569.19/km^{2})
- Time zone: UTC-6 (Central (CST))
  - Summer (DST): UTC-5 (CDT)
- ZIP code: 73841
- Area code: 580
- FIPS code: 40-27350
- GNIS feature ID: 2412643

Fort Supply is a town in Woodward County, Oklahoma, United States, 13 kilometres (8.1 mi) northwest of the city of Woodward, the county seat. As of the 2020 census, Fort Supply had a population of 317.

== History ==
The United States Army post of Fort Supply was established in 1868 as a "Camp of Supply" for the winter campaign that General Philip Sheridan led against the Southern Plains Indians.

People established the town of Fitzgerald three miles west-southwest of the site of the former Fort Supply in 1902, but this town quickly failed.

Rancher H. H. Halsell sold the land one mile west of Fort Supply to territorial legislator James P. Gandy. Gandy hired surveyors to plat the land for a town site and founded the town of Supply in 1903. He moved most of the original buildings of Supply from the recently failed town of Fitzgerald. The Government established the first post office for the town of Supply on May 12, 1903. In the early years, area farmers and ranchers centered their economic trade around the town.

In 1908, the State of Oklahoma transformed Fort Supply, the derelict army post, into Western Oklahoma State Hospital, also known as Western State Hospital or Fort Supply State Hospital, the first state-operated mental institution of Oklahoma.

The Flood Control Act of 1936 provided for construction of a dam and reservoir one mile southeast of the town in the valley of Wolf Creek. Work began on the largest earthen dam in the United States of America in October 1938 and Fort Supply Lake was completed in May 1942. The United States Army Corps of Engineers administers Fort Supply Lake and the adjacent wildlife and recreation area.

On May 1, 1943, the people changed the name of the post office and town of Supply to Fort Supply.

On December 6, 1988, the State of Oklahoma located a new prison, William S. Key Correctional Center, on the grounds of nearby former Fort Supply. Western State Psychiatric Center also has operations on the grounds. Agriculture and employment at these state institutions form the economic base of the community of Fort Supply.

== Geography ==
According to the United States Census Bureau, the town has a total area of 0.2 square miles (0.52 km^{2}), all land.

Fort Supply Reservoir is directly south; the Hal & Fern Cooper Wildlife Management Area, covering 16,080 acres and administered by the Oklahoma Department of Wildlife Conservation, is to the east.

=== Climate ===
Climate data for Fort Supply, Oklahoma. (Elevation 2,030ft)
Month	Jan	Feb	Mar	Apr	May	Jun	Jul	Aug	Sep	Oct	Nov	Dec	Year
Record high °F (°C)	86 (30)	92 (33)	95 (35)	99 (37)	105 (41)	110 (43)	110 (43)	111 (44)	108 (42)	98 (37)	91 (33)	86 (30)	110 (43)
Mean daily maximum °F (°C)	48.1 (8.9)	52.4 (11.3)	61.0 (16.1)	71.8 (22.1)	78.9 (26.1)	88.2 (31.2)	93.9 (34.4)	92.9 (33.8)	84.6 (29.2)	74.1 (23.4)	60.3 (15.7)	49.9 (9.9)	71.4 (21.9)
Mean daily minimum °F (°C)	20.5 (−6.4)	24.7 (−4.1)	32.7 (0.4)	43.8 (6.6)	54.1 (12.3)	64.0 (17.8)	68.6 (20.3)	66.8 (19.3)	57.8 (14.3)	45.6 (7.6)	32.1 (0.1)	23.3 (−4.8)	44.5 (6.9)
Record low °F (°C)	−18 (−28)	−12 (−24)	−10 (−23)	17 (−8)	27 (−3)	35 (2)	48 (9)	40 (4)	29 (−2)	15 (−9)	1 (−17)	−13 (−25)	−18 (−28)
Average precipitation inches (mm)	0.60 (15)	1.00 (25)	1.71 (43)	1.94 (49)	3.72 (94)	3.40 (86)	2.43 (62)	2.63 (67)	2.10 (53)	2.03 (52)	1.12 (28)	0.84 (21)	23.53 (598)
Average snowfall inches (cm)	2.8 (7.1)	3.4 (8.6)	2.5 (6.4)	0.5 (1.3)	0 (0)	0 (0)	0 (0)	0 (0)	0 (0)	0.1 (0.25)	0.8 (2.0)	2.3 (5.8)	12.3 (31)
Source: The Western Regional Climate Center

== Demographics ==
Historical population
Census	Pop.	Note	%±
1910	169		—
1920	231		36.7%
1930	230		−0.4%
1940	414		80.0%
1950	293		−29.2%
1960	394		34.5%
1970	550		39.6%
1980	559		1.6%
1990	369		−34.0%
2000	328		−11.1%
2010	330		0.6%
2020	317		−3.9%
U.S. Decennial Census

=== 2020 census ===
As of the 2020 census, Fort Supply had a population of 317. The median age was 37.4 years. 23.0% of residents were under the age of 18 and 14.5% of residents were 65 years of age or older. For every 100 females there were 124.8 males, and for every 100 females age 18 and over there were 132.4 males age 18 and over.

0.0% of residents lived in urban areas, while 100.0% lived in rural areas.

There were 118 households in Fort Supply, of which 43.2% had children under the age of 18 living in them. Of all households, 46.6% were married-couple households, 17.8% were households with a male householder and no spouse or partner present, and 27.1% were households with a female householder and no spouse or partner present. About 21.2% of all households were made up of individuals and 10.1% had someone living alone who was 65 years of age or older.

There were 140 housing units, of which 15.7% were vacant. The homeowner vacancy rate was 0.0% and the rental vacancy rate was 8.5%.

Racial composition as of the 2020 census
Race	Number	Percent
White	264	83.3%
Black or African American	5	1.6%
American Indian and Alaska Native	1	0.3%
Asian	0	0.0%
Native Hawaiian and Other Pacific Islander	0	0.0%
Some other race	18	5.7%
Two or more races	29	9.1%
Hispanic or Latino (of any race)	32	10.1%

=== 2000 census ===
As of the census of 2000, there were 328 people, 136 households, and 98 families residing in the town. The population density was 1,458.4 inhabitants per square mile (563.1/km^{2}). There were 171 housing units at an average density of 760.3 per square mile (293.6/km^{2}). The racial makeup of the town was 95.73% White, 0.30% African American, 1.83% Native American, 0.61% from other races, and 1.52% from two or more races. Hispanic or Latino of any race were 0.91% of the population.

There were 136 households, out of which 25.7% had children under the age of 18 living with them, 61.8% were married couples living together, 7.4% had a female householder with no husband present, and 27.9% were non-families. 27.2% of all households were made up of individuals, and 14.0% had someone living alone who was 65 years of age or older. The average household size was 2.41 and the average family size was 2.91.

In the town, the population was spread out, with 24.4% under the age of 18, 7.0% from 18 to 24, 23.5% from 25 to 44, 27.4% from 45 to 64, and 17.7% who were 65 years of age or older. The median age was 41 years. For every 100 females, there were 86.4 males. For every 100 females age 18 and over, there were 86.5 males.

The median income for a household in the town was $30,893, and the median income for a family was $37,500. Males had a median income of $28,333 versus $20,833 for females. The per capita income for the town was $15,836. About 5.8% of families and 6.8% of the population were below the poverty line, including 13.4% of those under age 18 and none of those age 65 or over.

== Historic sites ==
The nearby Cooper Bison Kill Site is on the National Register of Historic Places listings in Harper County, Oklahoma.

The Fort Supply Historic District is on the National Register of Historic Places listings in Woodward County, Oklahoma.
