= Wolf Creek (Texas and Oklahoma) =

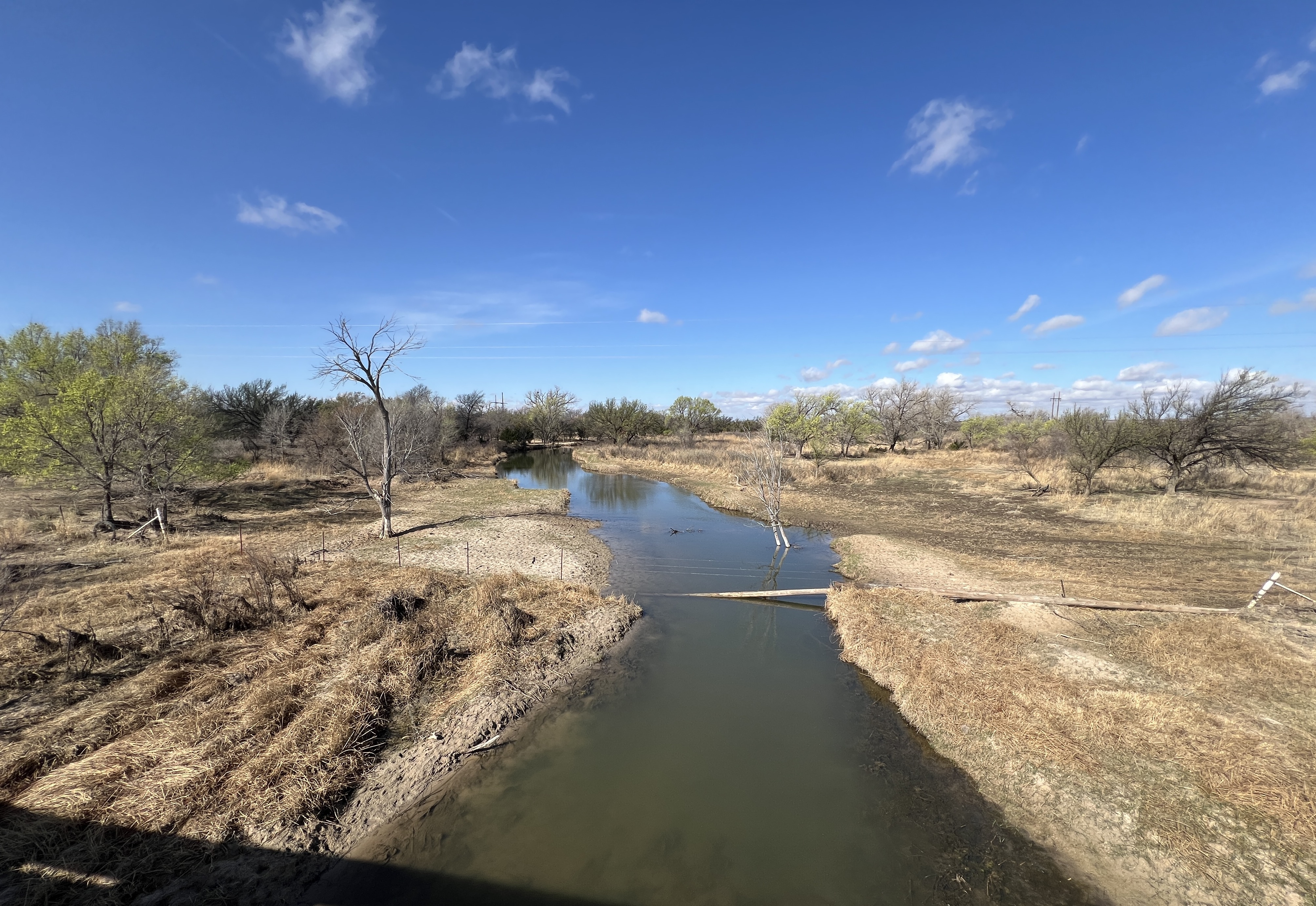
- Wolf Creek north of Lipscomb, TX

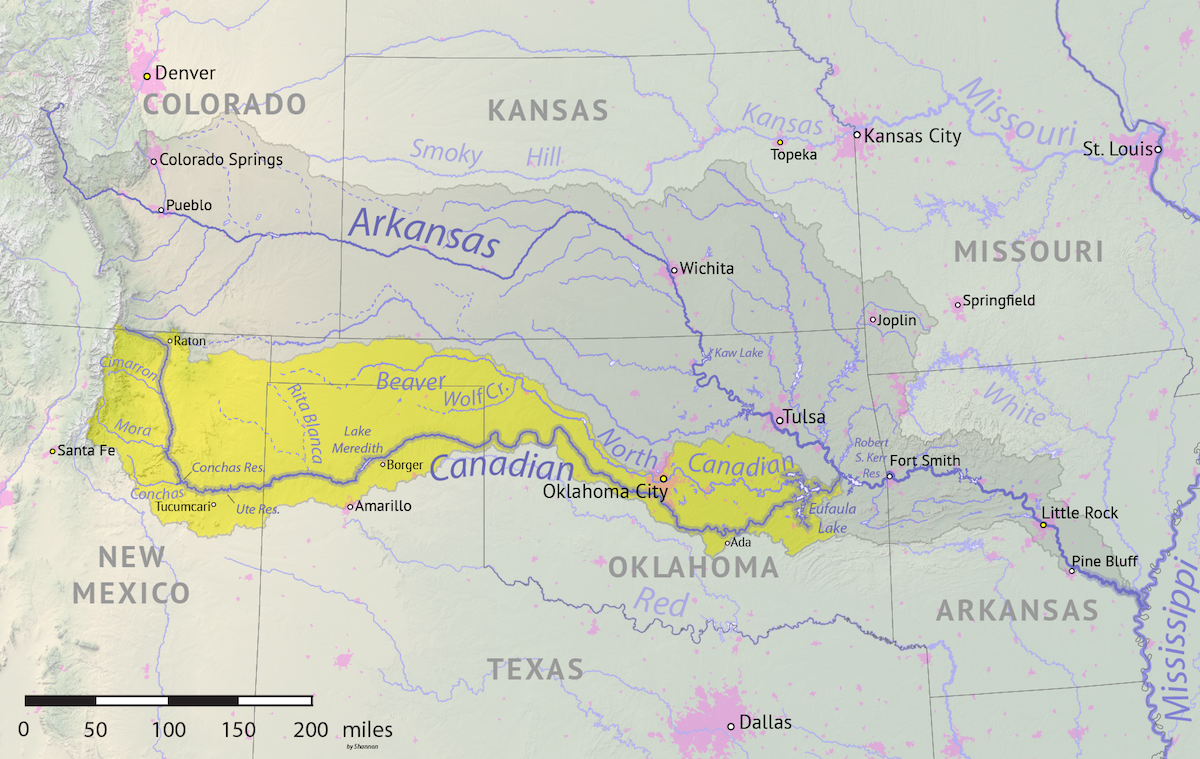
- A map showing Wolf Creek within the Canadian River watershed

Location
- States: Texas, Oklahoma
- Counties: Ochiltree, Lipscomb (Texas); Ellis, Woodward (Oklahoma)

Physical characteristics
- Source
  - location: Ochiltree County, Texas
- Mouth: North Canadian River
  - location: Woodward County, Oklahoma
  - coordinates: 36.5889236°N 99.5017789°W
  - elevation: 1,952 ft (595 m)
- Basin size: 1,922.6 square miles (4,980 km^{2})

Wolf Creek is a tributary of the North Canadian River in Texas and Oklahoma in the United States. It begins in Ochiltree County, Texas, and flows generally eastward and northeastward through Lipscomb County into Ellis and Woodward counties in Oklahoma, where it joins the Beaver River to form the North Canadian River. The creek drains an area of 1,922.6 square miles (4,980 km^{2}).

The creek is dammed in Woodward County to form Fort Supply Lake.

== See also ==
- List of rivers of Oklahoma
- List of rivers of Texas
