= North Canadian River =

River in Oklahoma

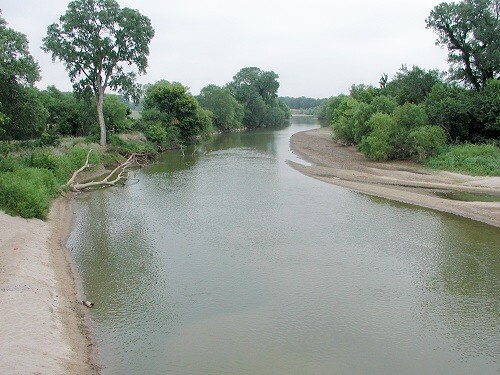
- The North Canadian River near Yukon, Oklahoma

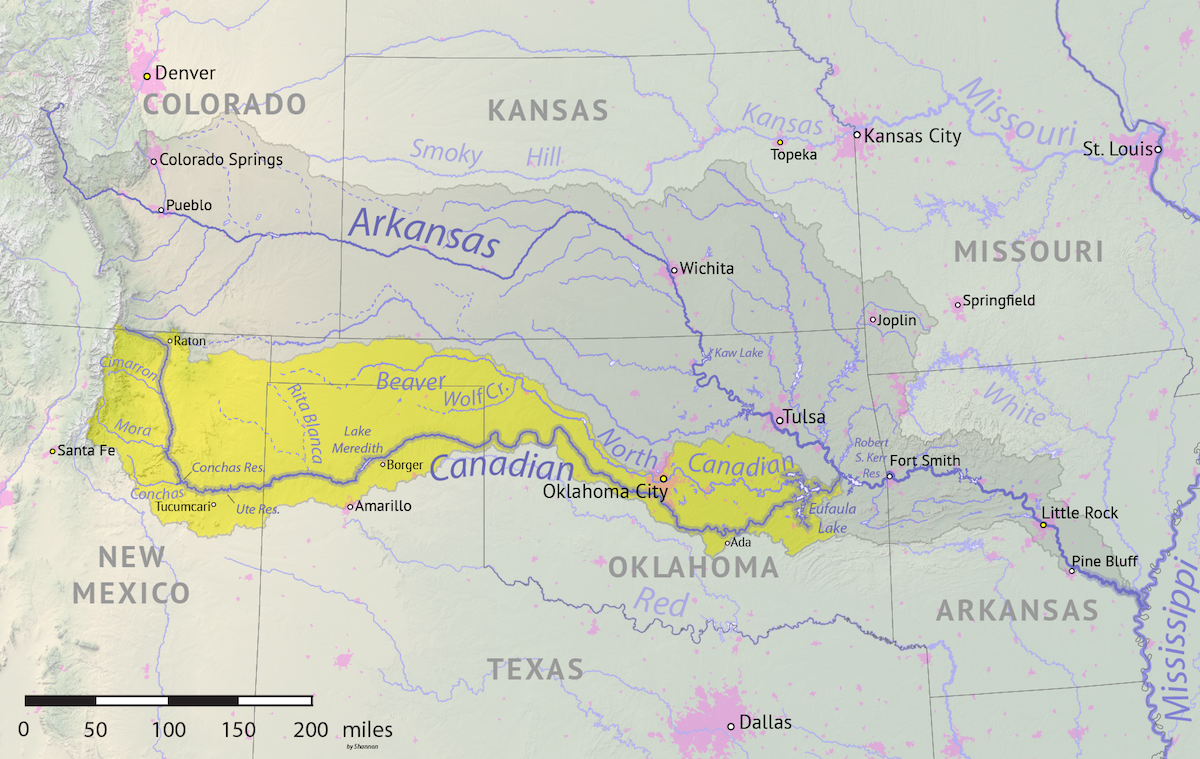
- Map of the Canadian River watershed showing the North Canadian River

Location
- Country: United States
- States: Oklahoma

Physical characteristics
- Source: Confluence of Beaver River and Wolf Creek
  - location: Woodward County
  - coordinates: 36.5889236°N 99.5017789°W
  - elevation: 1,952 ft (595 m)
- Mouth: Eufaula Lake, Canadian River
  - location: McIntosh County
  - coordinates: 35.3750995°N 95.6099852°W
  - elevation: 581 ft (177 m)
- Length: 800 mi (1,300 km)
- Basin size: 17,955 square miles (46,500 km^{2})
- Discharge
  - location: Wetumka
  - average: 834 cu ft/s (23.6 m^{3}/s)

The North Canadian River is a river, 440 miles (710 km) long, in Oklahoma in the United States. It is a tributary of the Canadian River, draining an area of 17,955 square miles (46,500 km^{2}) in a watershed that includes parts of northeastern New Mexico and the Texas Panhandle.

A seven-mile (eleven-kilometer) portion of the river flowing through Oklahoma City was renamed the Oklahoma River in 2004.

== Course ==
The North Canadian River is formed by the confluence of the Beaver River and Wolf Creek, northeast of the town of Fort Supply in Woodward County, Oklahoma. It flows generally eastward and southeastward, through Woodward, Major, Dewey, Blaine, Canadian, Oklahoma, Lincoln, Pottawatomie, Seminole, Hughes, Okfuskee, Okmulgee, and McIntosh counties, through the cities and towns of Woodward, Oklahoma City, and Shawnee. It is dammed near Canton to form Canton Lake in Blaine County, and in Oklahoma City to form Lake Overholser. It flows into the Canadian River in McIntosh County as part of Lake Eufaula, which is formed by a dam on the Canadian River.

== Oklahoma River ==
A seven-mile (eleven-kilometer) portion of the river flowing through Oklahoma City was renamed the Oklahoma River in 2004. This portion has several locks that have created a series of small lakes in which rowing, kayaking, and canoeing regattas take place (hosted by the Oklahoma City Boathouse Foundation, Chesapeake Boat House, and Oklahoma City University). Regatta activities include: 2.5 mile head races, 2000 meter sprints, and 500 meter sprints. It is the only location in the US conducting officially sanctioned night sprints under lights. The Oklahoma River was profiled in The New York Times on April 22, 2008.

== Variant names and definitions ==
The name "North Canadian River" has sometimes been applied to the Beaver River and one of the Beaver River's headwaters tributaries, Corrumpa Creek, extending the North Canadian River's length into New Mexico and Texas. The U.S. federal government used that definition from 1914 to 1970: A 1914 decision by the U.S. Board on Geographic Names (USBGN) defined the North Canadian River as including both the Beaver River and Corrumpa Creek as part of its course. A 1970 USBGN decision revised the 1914 definition, defining the North Canadian River as beginning at the confluence of the Beaver River and Wolf Creek.

In the language of the Muscogee (Creek) Nation it is called the "Oktahutchee." This is reflected by the poem "Song of the Oktahutche" by Muscogee writer Alexander Posey, which later gave its name to the first complete collection of his work. Posey himself died trying to cross the flooded river in 1908.

The USBGN's Geographic Names Information System also lists "Beaver Creek," "Beaver River," "Branche Nord de la Riviere Canadienne," "Honih'hiyo'he," "North Fork Canadian River," and "North Fork of Canadian River" as historical variant names for the river.

== Gallery ==
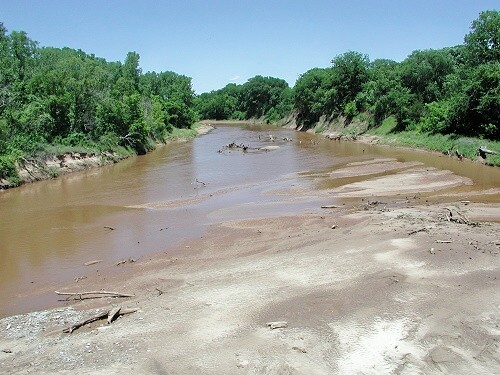
The North Canadian River near Shawnee

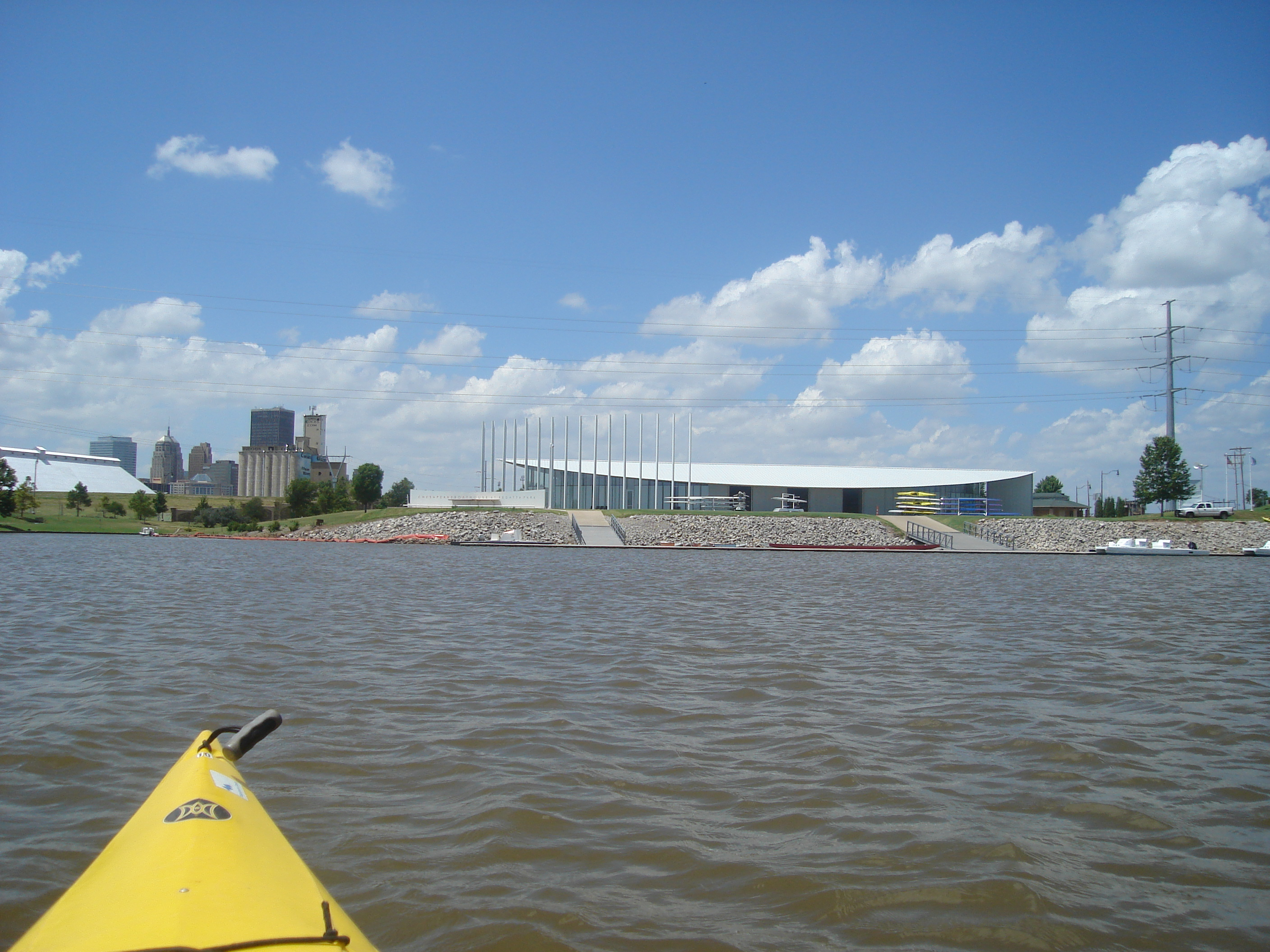
The Oklahoma River from a kayak in the center of the recreational rowing area, Chesapeake Boathouse and downtown Oklahoma City

== See also ==
- List of rivers of Oklahoma
