= National Register of Historic Places listings in Cimarron County, Oklahoma =

Location of Cimarron County in Oklahoma

This is a list of the National Register of Historic Places listings in Cimarron County, Oklahoma.

This is intended to be a complete list of the properties and districts on the National Register of Historic Places in Cimarron County, Oklahoma, United States. The locations of National Register properties and districts for which the latitude and longitude coordinates are included below, may be seen in a map.

Eight properties and districts are listed on the National Register in the county, including one National Historic Landmark.

This National Park Service list is complete through NPS recent listings posted March 21, 2025.

== Current listings ==
	Name on the Register	Image	Date listed	Location	City or town	Description
1	Autograph Rock Historic District	Autograph Rock Historic District	April 21, 1994 (#94000318)	Address Restricted	Boise City	
2	Bat Cave Archeological Site		September 1, 1978 (#78002223)	Address Restricted	Kenton	
3	Camp Nichols		October 15, 1966 (#66000628)	3 miles northeast of Wheeless on Ranch Rd. 36°45′16″N 102°55′35″W	Wheeless	
4	Cedar Breaks Archeological District		October 10, 1978 (#78002222)	Address Restricted	Felt	
5	Cimarron County Courthouse	Cimarron County Courthouse	August 23, 1984 (#84002988)	Cimarron Ave. 36°43′47″N 102°30′45″W	Boise City	
6	Cold Spring and Inscription Rock Historic District		April 21, 1994 (#94000317)	Address Restricted	Boise City	
7	Red Ghost Cave Archeological District		November 15, 1978 (#78002224)	Address Restricted	Kenton	
8	Three Entrance Cave Archeological District		November 29, 1978 (#78002225)	Address Restricted	Kenton	

== See also ==
- List of National Historic Landmarks in Oklahoma
- National Register of Historic Places listings in Oklahoma
