= Mineral, Oklahoma =

Ghost Town in Oklahoma, United States

Mineral, originally called Mineral City, was a settlement founded in what was then No Man’s Land, but which is now western Cimarron County in the Panhandle of the State of Oklahoma.

== History ==
Around 1886, coal was discovered in the area, and two mining companies laid out Mineral City to house workers. It briefly became a boomtown, with 2 or 3 general stores, a saloon, a blacksmith shop, and a population of about 100. The town had the only post office in the Cimarron County vicinity prior to 1890. In 1890, when the Panhandle became Beaver County of Oklahoma Territory, the town was one of only two communities in the area worth enumerating, having a population of 98. (Carrizo, just west over the line in New Mexico Territory, was the other, with 83 people; that settlement was later relocated a bit to the east into Oklahoma and renamed Kenton.)

Unfortunately, the coal gave out quickly, and within a few years the settlement was practically a ghost town. In 1895 what was left of the settlement relocated a few miles south to be more accessible to general traffic and nearby ranches, and definitively changed names to become simply Mineral. The new location was along South Carrizo Creek, south of the point where that watercourse is joined by Willow Creek, and just north of the old Santa Fe Trail which made it a convenient resupply point for travelers along that route. This placed it just to the east of, and about equidistant from, Kenton to the north and Wheeless to the south.

But when Cimarron County was created upon Oklahoma statehood in 1907, Mineral was not one of the six settlements which vied to become the county seat (with Boise City emerging the winner). By 1910, rail lines extended well into New Mexico and Colorado, and traffic along the Santa Fe Trail dropped considerably. Also by that time, the other towns in Cimarron County (namely Boise City, Kenton, Wheeless, Doby, and Mexhoma) all had their own post offices. The Mineral post office, located in Mineral’s remaining general store, closed along with the store in 1911, effectively ending the settlement.

== See also ==
- List of ghost towns in Oklahoma
