= Griggs, Oklahoma =

Unincorporated community in Oklahoma, US

- Unincorporated community
- Location within Oklahoma
- Coordinates: 36°36′10″N 102°07′21″W
- Country: United States
- State: Oklahoma
- County: Cimarron
- Elevation: 3,822 ft (1,165 m)
- Time zone: UTC-6 (Central (CST))
  - Summer (DST): UTC-5 (CDT)
- Area code: 580
- GNIS feature ID: 1100466

Griggs is an unincorporated community in Cimarron County, Oklahoma, United States, located in the Oklahoma Panhandle.

Griggs is east of Oklahoma State Highway 171 on E0280 Rd, then south on N0525Rd. It is approximately 22 driving miles north of Stratford, Texas and about 28 driving miles east-southeast of Boise City, the county seat. Griggs appears on a 1911 Rand McNally map of the county.
