= Autograph Rock Historic District =

Historic district in Oklahoma, United States

- U.S. National Register of Historic Places
- U.S. Historic district
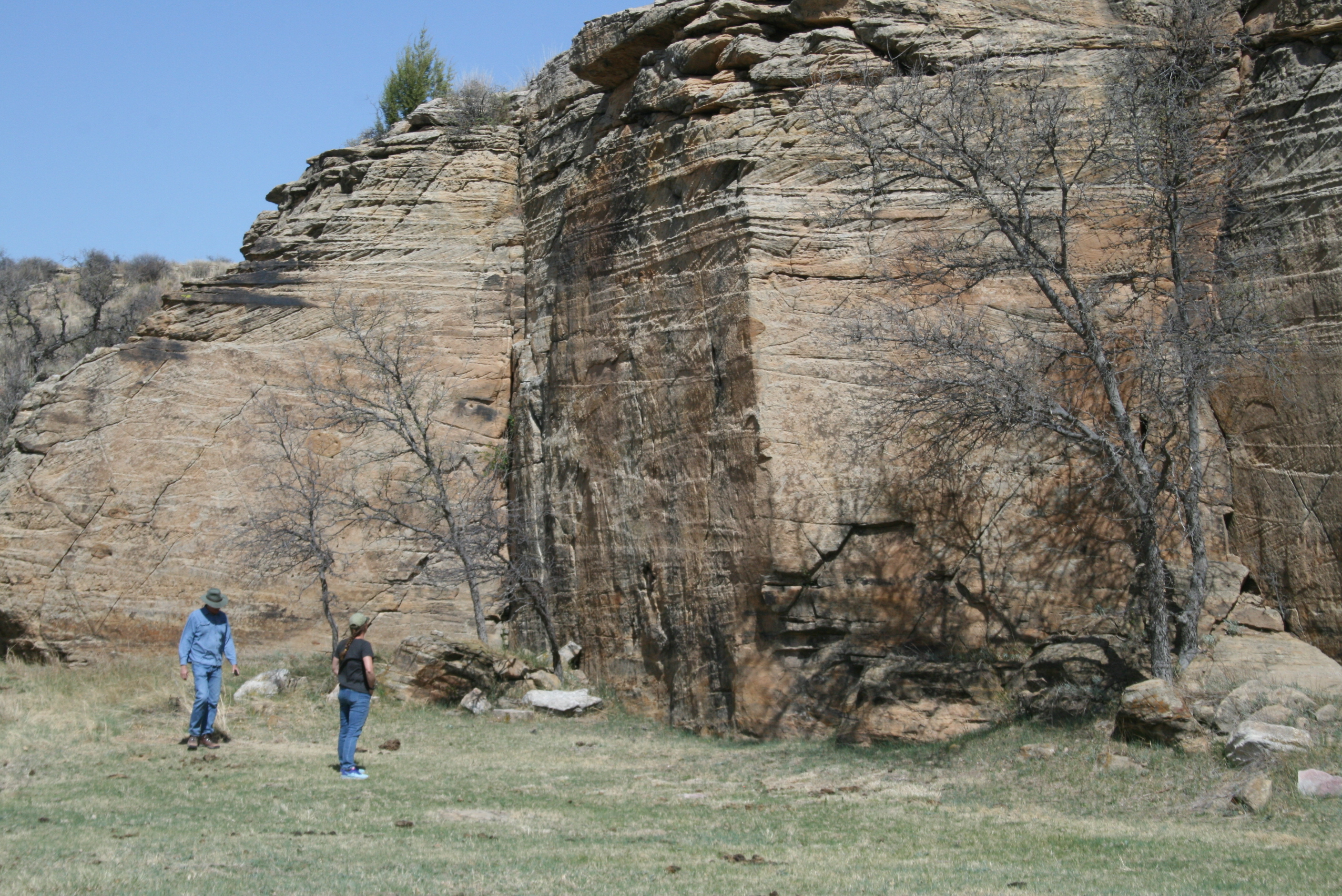
- Nearest city: Boise City, Oklahoma
- Area: 58.5 acres (23.7 ha)
- MPS: Santa Fe Trail MPS
- NRHP reference No.: 94000318
- Added to NRHP: April 21, 1994

The Autograph Rock Historic District, in Cimarron County, Oklahoma near Boise City, Oklahoma, is a 58.5-acre (23.7 ha) historic district that was listed on the National Register of Historic Places in 1994. It is associated with NPS Master Plan #123. It includes five contributing sites.

It includes four "rutted traces" of the Cimarron Cutoff of the Santa Fe Trail, and a sandstone outcropping known as Autograph Rock. The rock has travelers' names from the 1850-1865 era.

== See also ==
- Inscription Rock (Cimarron County, Oklahoma), also in an NRHP-listed historic district in Cimarron County, also involving travelers' name-carvings
