= Sturgis, Oklahoma =

Unincorporated community in Oklahoma, US

- Unincorporated community
- Location within Oklahoma
- Coordinates: 36°53′38″N 102°04′13″W
- Country: United States
- State: Oklahoma
- County: Cimarron
- Elevation: 3,770 ft (1,150 m)
- Time zone: UTC-6 (Central (CST))
  - Summer (DST): UTC-5 (CDT)
- Area code: 580
- GNIS feature ID: 1100860

Sturgis is an unincorporated community in northeastern Cimarron County, Oklahoma, United States. It is located on a railroad just north of U.S. Route 56. It is approximately 14 miles southwest of Elkhart, Kansas, and less than 28 miles northeast of the Cimarron County seat, Boise City.

Sturgis was connected to both Elkhart and Boise City by the Elkhart and Santa Fe Railway (both leased to and a wholly owned subsidiary of the Atchison, Topeka and Santa Fe Railway), which came through in 1925. The line is now part of the Cimarron Valley Railroad.

The Tri-State Point where Oklahoma, Kansas and Colorado come together, known as Eight Mile Corner, is about nine miles north of Sturgis.
