= Inscription Rock =

Inscription Rock may refer to:

in the United States

- Inscription Rock (Keams Canyon, Arizona), listed on the NRHP in Arizona
- Inscription Rock (Kelleys Island, Ohio), listed on the NRHP in Ohio
- Inscription Rock (Cimarron County, Oklahoma), on the Cimarron Cutoff of the Santa Fe Trail

== See also ==
- El Morro National Monument, near Ramah, New Mexico
