= Doby Springs, Oklahoma =

Ghost Town in Oklahoma, United States

Coordinates: 36°50′17″N 99°46′55″W

Doby Springs was a community in Harper County, Oklahoma, United States, approximately eight miles west of Buffalo, Oklahoma.

== History ==
A post office opened June 27, 1903, under the name of Ballaire. However, the name changed January 13, 1908 to Doby Springs. The community was named for townsite owner, C.C. Doby.

The town waged a fight with Buffalo to become the county seat, but lost in 1908 by 111 votes. The post office closed April 29, 1922. The town no longer exists, but the area is now a park with a lake, and supplies water to Buffalo.

The town should not be confused with Doby, Oklahoma in Cimarron County, which also waged an unsuccessful fight to become its county's seat.
