= Mexhoma, Oklahoma =

Unincorporated community in Oklahoma, US

- Unincorporated community
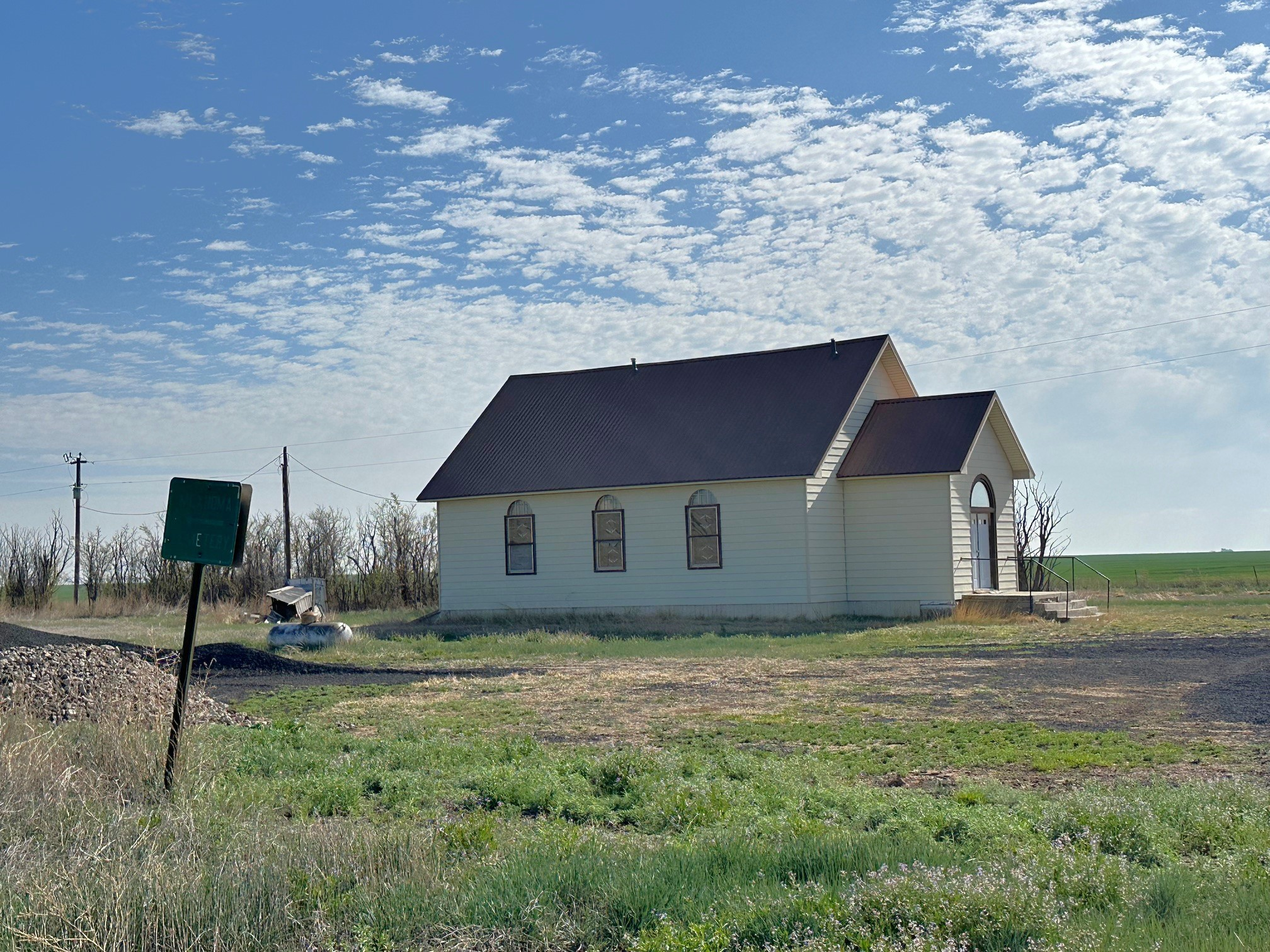
- Mexhoma in April 2024

- Location within Oklahoma
- Coordinates: 36°43′10″N 102°59′05″W
- Country: United States
- State: Oklahoma
- County: Cimarron
- Elevation: 4,826 ft (1,471 m)
- Time zone: UTC-6 (Central (CST))
  - Summer (DST): UTC-5 (CDT)
- Area code: 580
- GNIS feature ID: 1100631

Mexhoma is an unincorporated community in Cimarron County, in the U.S. state of Oklahoma. Located at the crossroads of N0020 Rd and E0200 Rd, the locale is about 27.3 miles west of the county seat of Boise City, and just one mile east of the New Mexico border.

== History ==
A post office called Mexhoma was established in 1909, and remained in operation until its closure in 1942. Located near the state line, the community's name is a portmanteau of New Mexico and Oklahoma.
