= Felt, Oklahoma =

Unincorporated community in Oklahoma, US

- Census-designated place
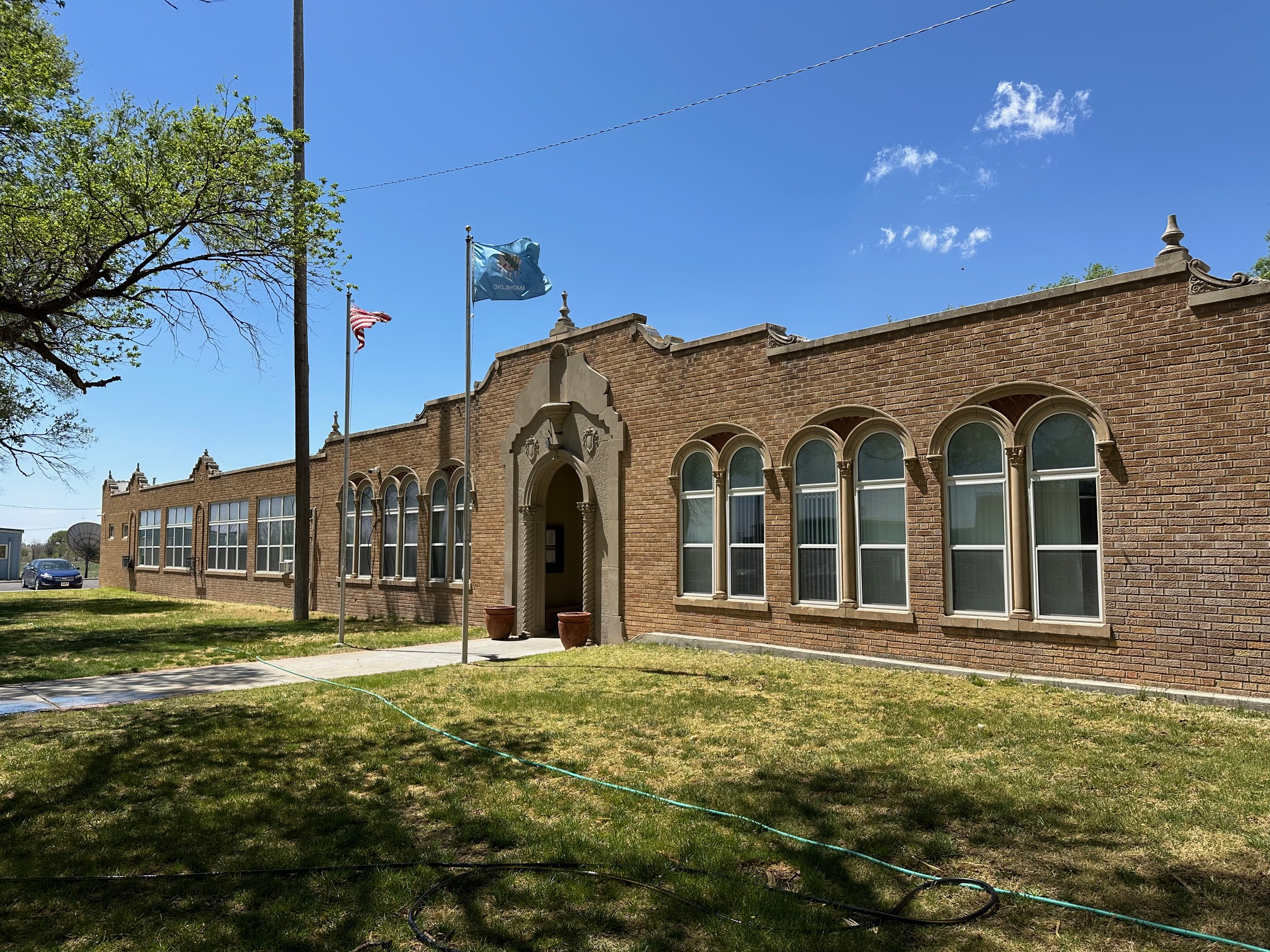
- Felt school in 2024

- Location in Cimarron County and state of Oklahoma
- Coordinates: 36°34′3″N 102°47′37″W
- Country: United States
- State: Oklahoma
- County: Cimarron

Area
  - Total: 0.53 sq mi (1.36 km^{2})
  - Land: 0.53 sq mi (1.36 km^{2})
  - Water: 0 sq mi (0.00 km^{2})
- Elevation: 4,450 ft (1,360 m)

Population (2020)
  - Total: 77
  - Density: 146.5/sq mi (56.56/km^{2})
- Time zone: UTC-6 (Central (CST))
  - Summer (DST): UTC-5 (CDT)
- ZIP code: 73937
- FIPS code: 40-25850

Felt is a small unincorporated community and census-designated place (CDP) in Cimarron County, Oklahoma, United States. As of the 2020 census, the town’s population was 77. It was named for C.F.W. Felt of the Santa Fe Railroad. Nearby is the Cedar Breaks Archeological District, included on the National Register of Historic Places listings in Cimarron County, Oklahoma. The community is served by a post office (established July 16, 1926) and a school. During the Great Depression in 1936 a farm in Felt was the site of the iconic Dust Bowl photograph titled Farmer and Sons Walking in the Face of a Dust Storm.

Felt was the original destination of the Elkhart and Santa Fe Railway. This line, both leased to and a wholly owned subsidiary of the Atchison, Topeka and Santa Fe Railway, was built in 1925 from Elkhart, Kansas through Boise City to the town, and extended to Clayton, New Mexico in 1932; but, the whole segment from Boise City to Clayton was abandoned in 1942.

== Geography ==
Felt is located in southwestern Cimarron County, near the western end of the Oklahoma Panhandle. Felt is less than five miles north of the Texas border, and just over 12 miles east of the New Mexico border. It is the nearest Oklahoma community to the Texhomex marker, being about 14 miles east-northeast of the tripoint of Texas, Oklahoma and New Mexico. U.S. Routes 56, 64, and 412 pass concurrently through the community, leading northeast 20 miles (32 km) to Boise City, the Cimarron County seat, and southwest 24 miles (39 km) to the larger Clayton, New Mexico. The town is essentially surrounded by the Rita Blanca National Grassland, and the federally-maintained Felt Picnic Site is just south of town.

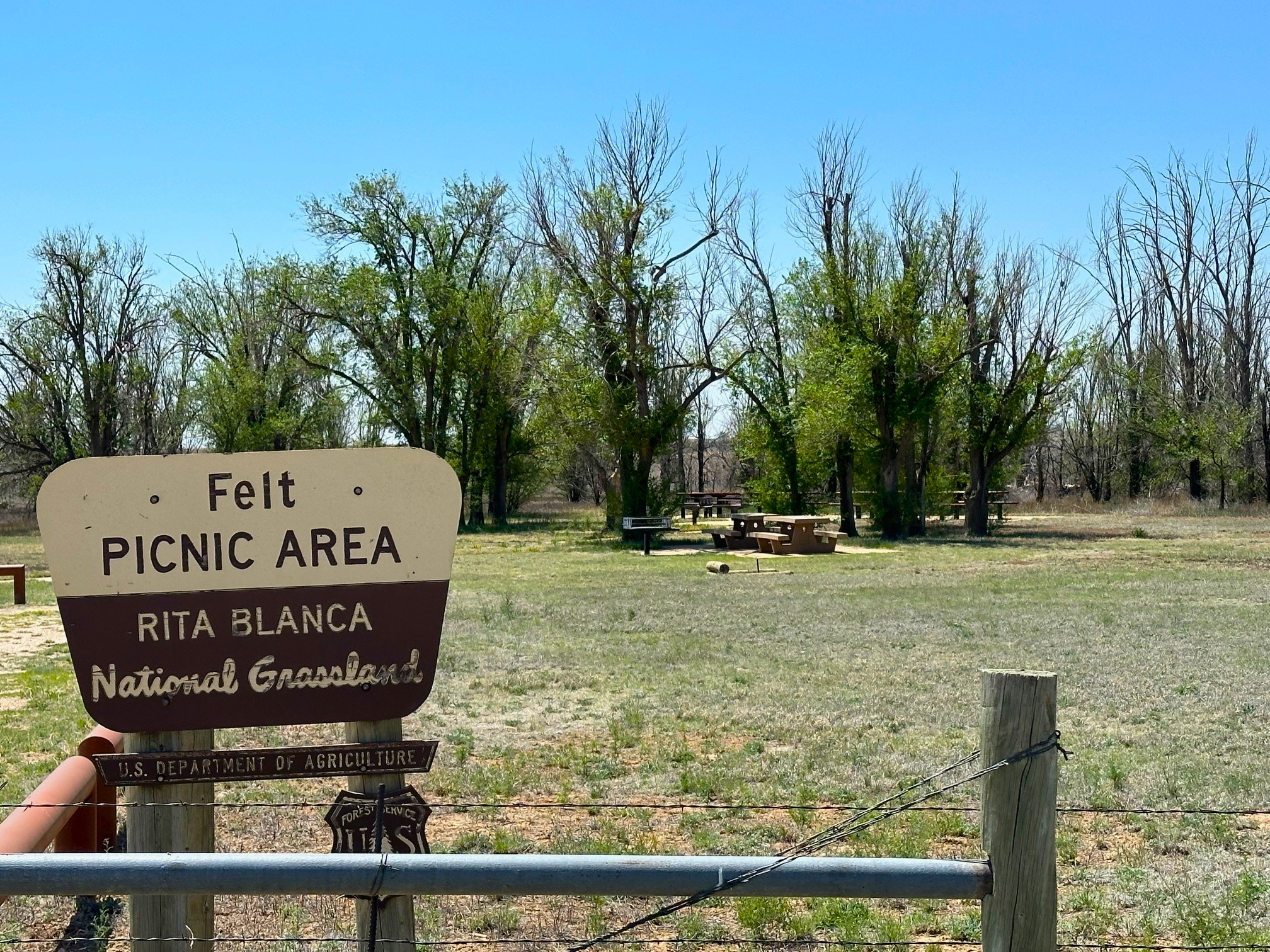
Felt Picnic Area, April 2024

== Demographics ==
Historical population
Census	Pop.	Note	%±
2020	77		—
U.S. Decennial Census

=== 2020 census ===
As of the 2020 census, Felt had a population of 77. The median age was 54.8 years. 27.3% of residents were under the age of 18 and 26.0% of residents were 65 years of age or older. For every 100 females there were 102.6 males, and for every 100 females age 18 and over there were 93.1 males age 18 and over.

0.0% of residents lived in urban areas, while 100.0% lived in rural areas.

There were 29 households in Felt, of which 13.8% had children under the age of 18 living in them. Of all households, 48.3% were married-couple households, 37.9% were households with a male householder and no spouse or partner present, and 6.9% were households with a female householder and no spouse or partner present. About 41.4% of all households were made up of individuals and 24.1% had someone living alone who was 65 years of age or older.

There were 45 housing units, of which 35.6% were vacant. The homeowner vacancy rate was 0.0% and the rental vacancy rate was 0.0%.

Racial composition as of the 2020 census
Race	Number	Percent
White	60	77.9%
Black or African American	0	0.0%
American Indian and Alaska Native	0	0.0%
Asian	0	0.0%
Native Hawaiian and Other Pacific Islander	0	0.0%
Some other race	8	10.4%
Two or more races	9	11.7%
Hispanic or Latino (of any race)	22	28.6%

== Education ==
The school district is Felt Public Schools.
