= Three Entrance Cave Archeological District =

Historic district in Oklahoma, United States

- U.S. National Register of Historic Places
- U.S. Historic district
- Nearest city: Kenton, Oklahoma
- Area: 9 acres (3.6 ha)
- NRHP reference No.: 78002225
- Added to NRHP: November 29, 1978

Three Entrance Cave Archeological District is a 9-acre (3.6 ha) archeological site in Cimarron County, Oklahoma, near Kenton, that was listed on the National Register of Historic Places in 1978. Its specific location is not disclosed by the National Register. It includes two contributing sites, at least one being a prehistoric camp location. It was listed on the National Register for its potential to yield information in the future.

The district contains steep cliffs with two "prominent" archeological sites and a series of springs. Artifacts suggest that it was occupied during 2000 B.C. to 1400 A.D.
