= Doby, Oklahoma =

Doby was a town that existed in the Oklahoma Panhandle in Cimarron County around the time of Oklahoma statehood in 1907. Some sources indicate it was four or five miles northwest of Boise City, but a 1911 Rand McNally map places it several miles to the southwest of that town. Its post office was established February 5, 1908.

It was substantial enough that, in 1908, it ran against Boise City and four other locations in an attempt to become the permanent County Seat for Cimarron County. It ended up in a run-off with Boise City for the privilege—which it lost. It was also substantial enough to have a printing company. The Cimarron Courier, the newspaper of Boise City and the wider county, was actually published by The Courier Publishing Co. of Doby, Oklahoma.

In any event, the post office closed April 30, 1914, and the town is no longer in existence. No settlement now appears on maps at that location.

Doby should not be confused with the former town of Doby Springs, Oklahoma, which was located in Harper County and also waged an unsuccessful campaign to become its County Seat.
