= Boise City Airport =

- IATA: none; ICAO: none; FAA LID: 17K

Summary
- Airport type: Public
- Owner/Operator: City of Boise City
- Serves: Boise City, Oklahoma
- Location: 3 miles (4.8 km) N of Boise City, Oklahoma
- Elevation AMSL: 4,178 ft (1,273 m)
- Coordinates: 36°46′27.48″N 102°30′37.57″W
- Interactive map of Boise City Airport

Runways
Direction	Length		Surface
Direction	ft	m	Surface
04/22	4,210	1,283	Asphalt

Statistics (2009)
- Aircraft operations: 3500
- Based aircraft: 9
- Source: Federal Aviation Administration

Boise City Airport (FAA LID: 17K) is in Cimarron County, Oklahoma, four miles north of the City of Boise City, which owns it.

== History ==
The airport was activated in August of 1946. The 1927 trans-Atlantic flight of Charles Lindbergh led to development of municipal airports generally in Oklahoma.

== Facilities ==
Boise City Airport covers 43 hectares (107 acres) and has a 4,211 ft (1,284 m) x 60 ft (18 m) runway.

The airport averaged 67 aircraft operations per week for the 12-month period ending 26 November 2019. Twelve aircraft were then based at the airport: 10 single-engine and 2 multi-engine.

== See also ==
- List of airports in Oklahoma
