= CVRR =

CVRR may refer to:

- Cimarron Valley Railroad
- Cumberland Valley Railroad
