= Cedar Breaks Archeological District =

Historic district in Oklahoma, United States

- U.S. National Register of Historic Places
- U.S. Historic district
- Nearest city: Felt, Oklahoma
- Area: 160 acres (65 ha)
- NRHP reference No.: 78002222
- Added to NRHP: October 10, 1978

The Cedar Breaks Archeological District, in Cimarron County, Oklahoma near Felt, is a 160-acre (65 ha) archeological site that was listed on the U.S. National Register of Historic Places in 1978. It includes three contributing sites denoted Ci-193, Ci-194 and Ci-195; it includes rock art and at least one camp site area. It was listed on the National Register for its potential to yield information in the future.

Within the three sites are "a series of six, well-defined stone circles with scattered lithic debris; a small cave/shelter with petroglyphs; and a cliff face with prehistoric petroglyphs and historic carvings."
