= Bat Cave site =

Archaeological site in Cimarron County, Oklahoma, US

- Bat Cave Site (34CI69)
- U.S. National Register of Historic Places
- Nearest city: Kenton, Oklahoma
- Area: 3 acres (1.2 ha)
- NRHP reference No.: 78002223
- Added to NRHP: September 1, 1978

The Bat Cave Site (34CI69), near Kenton, Cimarron County, Oklahoma, is a 3-acre (1.2 ha) archeological site that was listed on the National Register of Historic Places in 1978. It was listed on the National Register for its potential to yield information in the future.

Its address is restricted. According to an Oklahoma state website, it is an "intact cave dwelling site"; it is apparently the location of precontact activity during the transition period between hunter/gatherers and a horticulturist/subsistence people. The ancient campsite is under water.
