= Farmer and Sons Walking in the Face of a Dust Storm =

1936 photograph

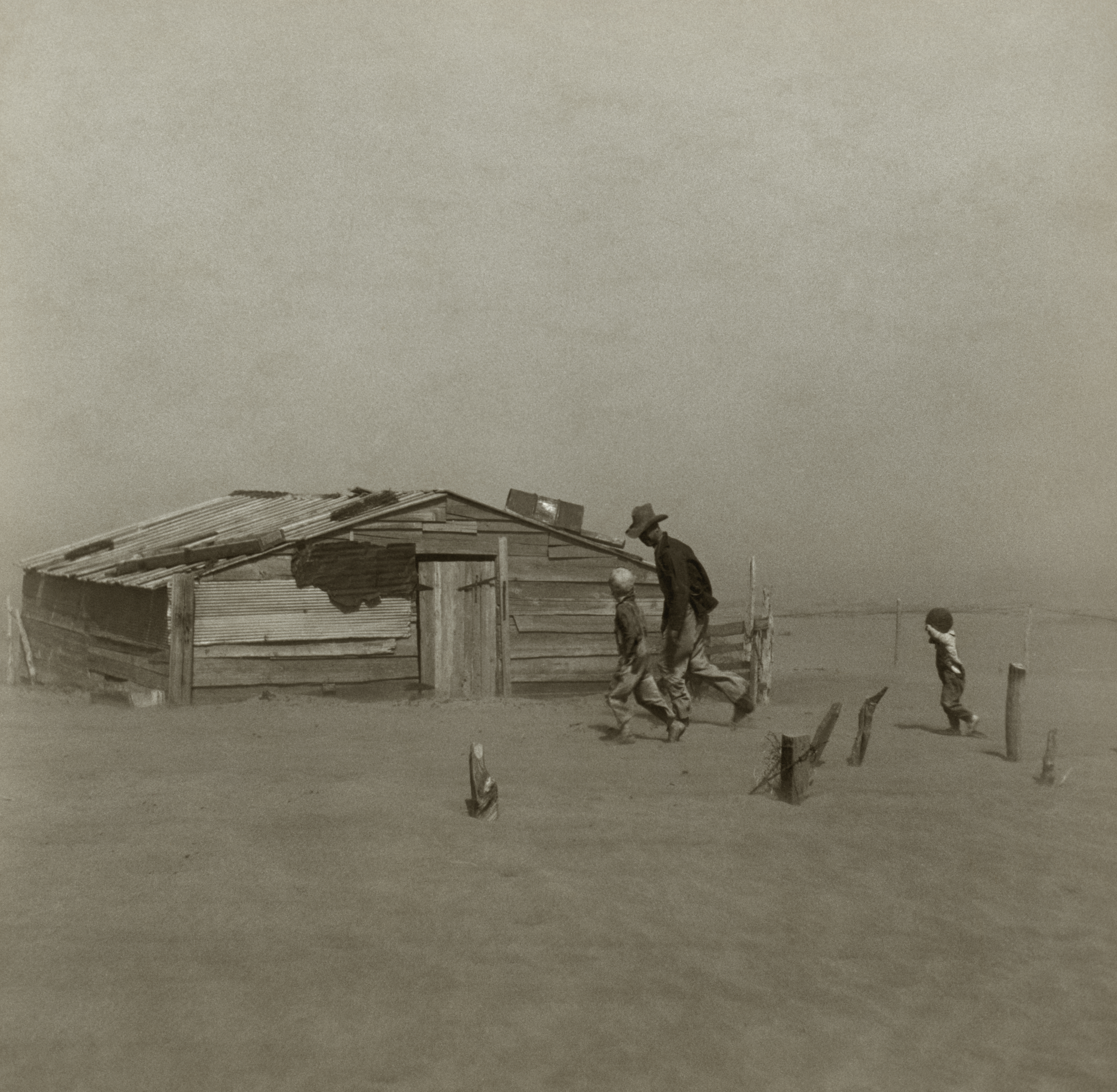
A farmer and his two sons during a dust storm in Cimarron County, Oklahoma, April 1936; Resettlement Administration photograph by Arthur Rothstein

Farmer and Sons Walking in the Face of a Dust Storm is a 1936 photograph of the Dust Bowl taken by 21-year-old Arthur Rothstein, a photographer for the federal Resettlement Administration, while he was driving through Cimarron County, Oklahoma. The photo shows a farmer and his two sons running from the dust to a dilapidated shed past fence posts nearly submerged in dust. While passing through Oklahoma, Rothstein spotted the farmer Arthur Coble (1896–1956), a native of Sailor Springs, Illinois, and his two young sons, Milton Garth Coble (1930–1973) and Darrel Arthur Coble (1933–1979), and photographed them on their farm near Felt, Oklahoma. Rothstein's original print is captioned "Farmer and sons walking in the face of a dust storm. Cimarron County, Oklahoma, April 1936". Some claim the scene was reenacted or staged, but the Cobles affirmed that it was not, and it remains one of the most emblematic images of the struggles endured during the Dust Bowl and the Great Depression.
