= Red Ghost Cave Archeological District =

Historic district in Oklahoma, United States

- U.S. National Register of Historic Places
- U.S. Historic district
- Nearest city: Kenton, Oklahoma
- Area: 10 acres (4.0 ha)
- NRHP reference No.: 78002224
- Added to NRHP: November 15, 1978

The Red Ghost Cave Archeological District in Cimarron County, Oklahoma near Kenton is a 10-acre (4.0 ha) archeological site that was listed on the National Register of Historic Places in 1978. It includes a prehistoric camp among three contributing sites in the district, and includes what has also been known as Ci-39 and Ci-68.

In particular it includes "three caves associated with prehistoric aboriginal occupations" and also prehistoric petroglyphs and historic era graffiti.
