= Arthur Rothstein =

American photojournalist (1915–1985)

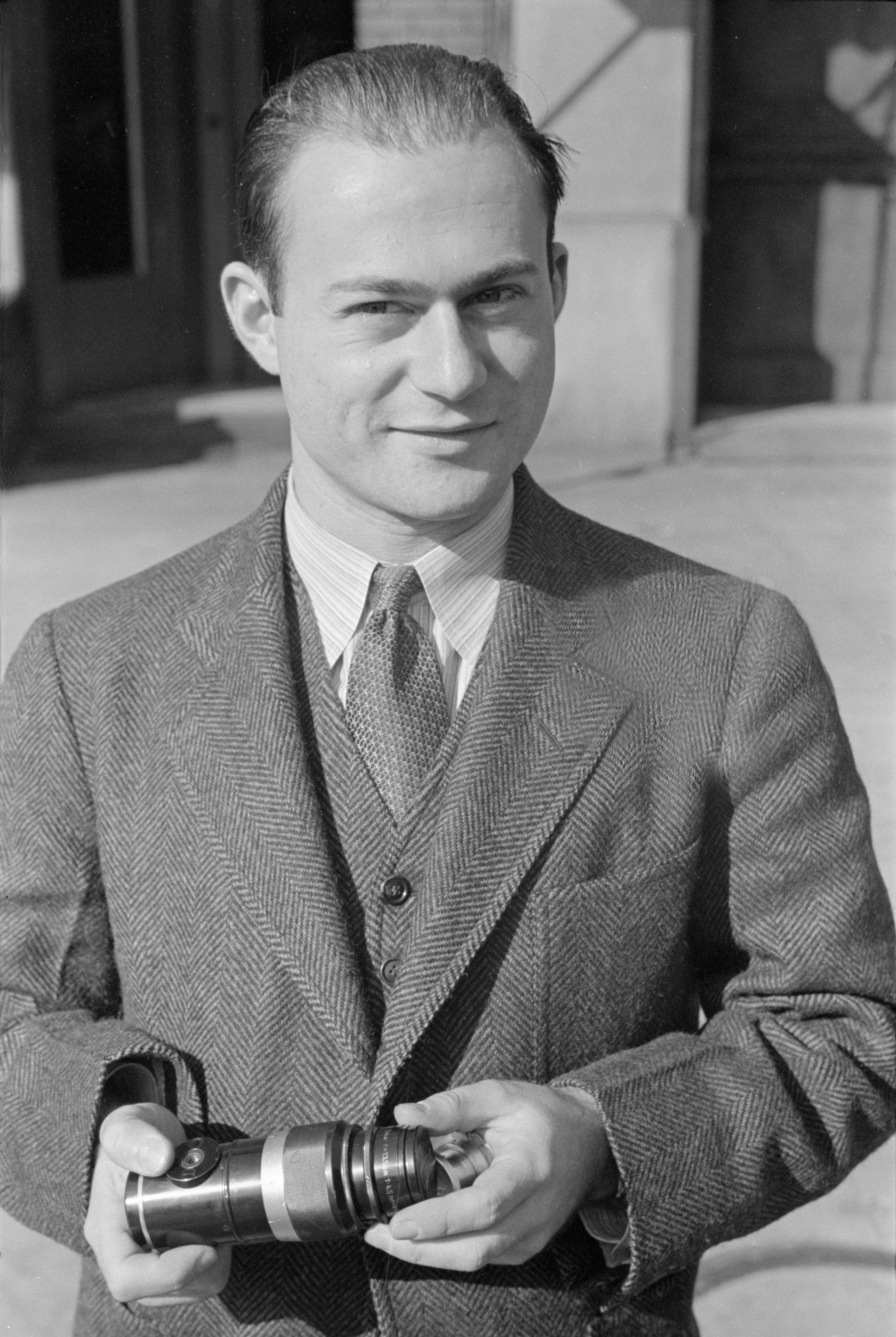
- Rothstein in 1938
- Born: July 17, 1915; New York City, US
- Died: November 11, 1985 (aged 70)
- Education: Columbia University (B.A.)
- Occupations: Photojournalist and teacher
- Known for: Photography

Arthur Rothstein (July 17, 1915 – November 11, 1985) was an American photographer. His career spanned five decades, and he received recognition as one of America's premier photojournalists.

== Life and career ==
The son of Jewish immigrants, Rothstein was born in Manhattan, New York City, and he grew up in the Bronx. He was a 1935 graduate of Columbia University, where he was a founder of the University Camera Club and photography editor of The Columbian, the undergraduate yearbook. He was a classmate of abstract painter Ad Reinhardt. Following his graduation from Columbia during the Great Depression, Rothstein was invited to Washington DC by one of his professors at Columbia, Roy Stryker. Rothstein had been Stryker's student at Columbia University in the early 1930s.

In 1935, as a college senior, Rothstein prepared a set of copy photographs for a picture source book on American agriculture that Stryker and another professor, Rexford Tugwell were assembling. The book was never published, but before the year was out, Tugwell, who had left Columbia to be part of FDR's New Deal brain trust, hired Stryker. Stryker hired Rothstein to set up the darkroom for Stryker's Photo Unit of the Historical Section of the Resettlement Administration (RA).

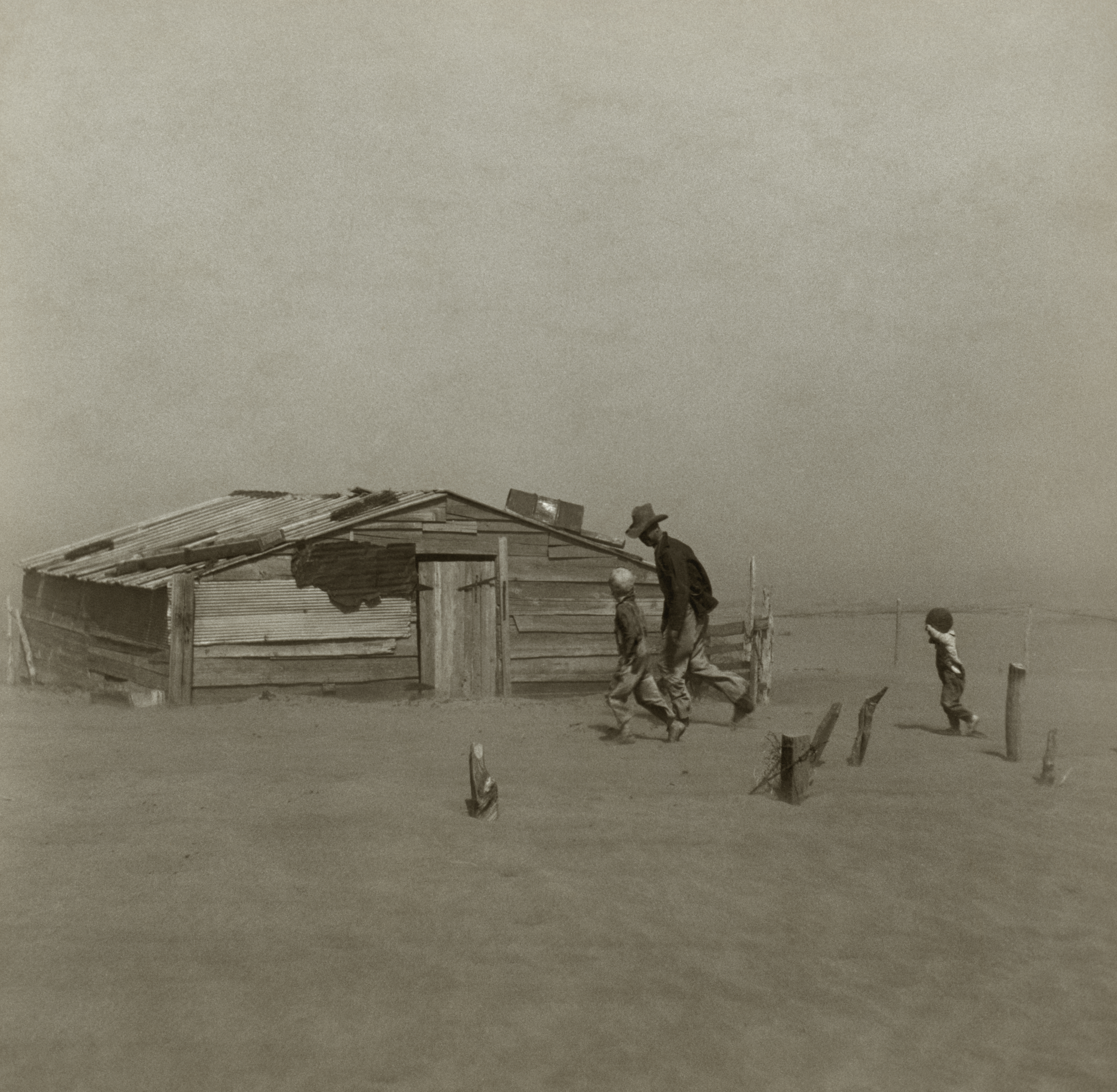
Rothstein's Resettlement Administration photograph Farmer and Sons Walking in the Face of a Dust Storm, an iconic image of the Dust Bowl taken in Cimarron County, Oklahoma, in April 1936

Arthur Rothstein became the first photographer sent out by Roy Stryker, the head of the Photo Unit. During the next five years he shot photographs of rural America. He and other FSA photographers, including Esther Bubley, Marjory Collins, Marion Post Wolcott, Walker Evans, Russell Lee, Gordon Parks, Jack Delano, John Vachon, Carl Mydans, Dorothea Lange and Ben Shahn, were employed to document the living conditions of the rural poor in the United States. The Resettlement Administration became the Farm Security Administration (FSA) in 1937. Later, when the country geared up for World War II, the FSA became part of the Office of War Information (OWI).

The photographs made during Rothstein's five-year stint with the Photo Unit form a catalog of the agency's initiatives. One of his first assignments was to document the lives of some Virginia farmers who were being evicted to make way for the Shenandoah National Park and about to be relocated by the Resettlement Administration, and subsequent trips took him to the Dust Bowl and to cattle ranches in Montana.

The immediate incentive for his February 1937 assignment came from the interest generated by congressional consideration of farm tenant legislation sponsored in the Senate by John H. Bankhead II, a Democrat from Alabama with a strong interest in agriculture. Enacted in July, the Bankhead-Jones Farm Tenant Act gave the agency its new lease on life as the Farm Security Administration.

=== Gee's Bend ===
On February 18, 1937, Stryker wrote Rothstein that the journalist Beverly Smith had told him about a tenant community at Gee's Bend, Alabama, and was preparing an article on tenancy for the July issue of The American Magazine, but Stryker sensed bigger possibilities, telling Rothstein, "We could do a swell story; one that Life [magazine] will grab." Stryker planned to visit Alabama and asked Rothstein to wait for him, but he was never able to make the trip, and Rothstein went to Gee's Bend alone.

The residents of Gee's Bend symbolized two different things to the Resettlement Administration. On the one hand, reports about the community prepared by the agency describe the residents as isolated and primitive, people whose speech, habits, and material culture reflected an African origin and an older way of life. On the other hand, the agency's agenda for rehabilitation implied a view of the residents as the victims of slavery and the farm-tenant system on a former plantation. The two perceptions may be seen as related: if these tenants — despite their primitive culture— could benefit from training and financial assistance, their success would demonstrate the efficacy of the programs.

Unlike the subjects of many Resettlement Administration and Farm Security Administration photographs, the people of Gee's Bend are not portrayed as victims. The photographs do not show the back-breaking work of cultivation and harvest, but only offer a glimpse of spring plowing. At home, the residents do not merely inhabit substandard housing but are engaged in a variety of domestic activities. The dwellings at Gee's Bend must have been as uncomfortable as the frame shacks thrown up for farm workers everywhere, but Rothstein's photographs emphasize the log cabins' picturesque qualities. This affirming image of life in Gee's Bend is reinforced by Rothstein's deliberate, balanced compositions which lend dignity to the people being pictured.

There does not seem to have been a Life magazine story about Gee's Bend, but a long article ran in the New York Times Magazine of August 22, 1937. It is illustrated by eleven of Rothstein's pictures, with a text that draws heavily upon a Resettlement Administration report dated in May. The story extols the agency's regional director as intelligent and sympathetic and describes the Gee's Bend project in glowing terms. Reporter John Temple Graves II perceived the project as retaining agrarian—and African—values.

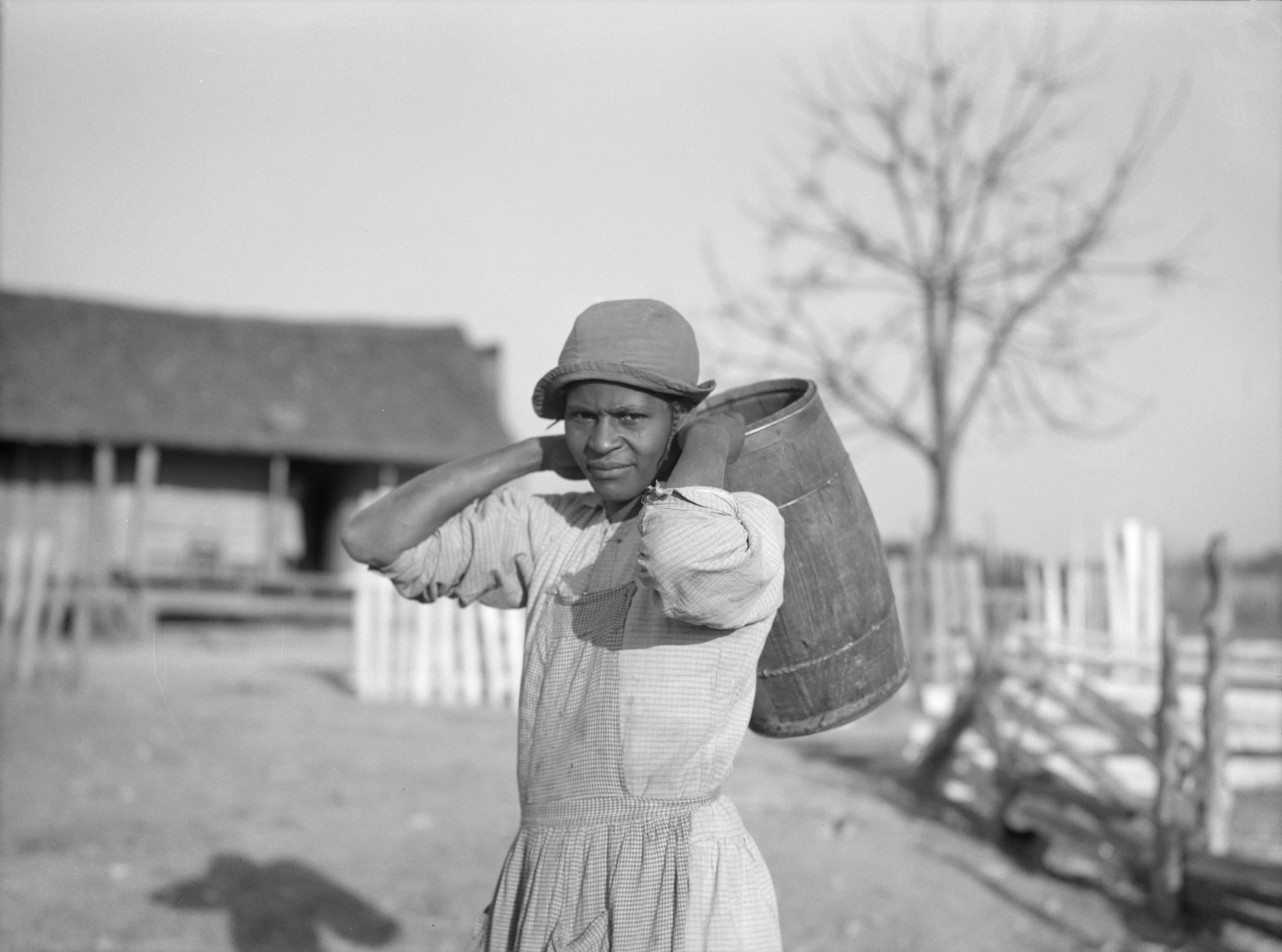
Annie Pettway Bendolph carrying water. Gee's Bend, Alabama. April 1937. Photographed by Arthur Rothstein.

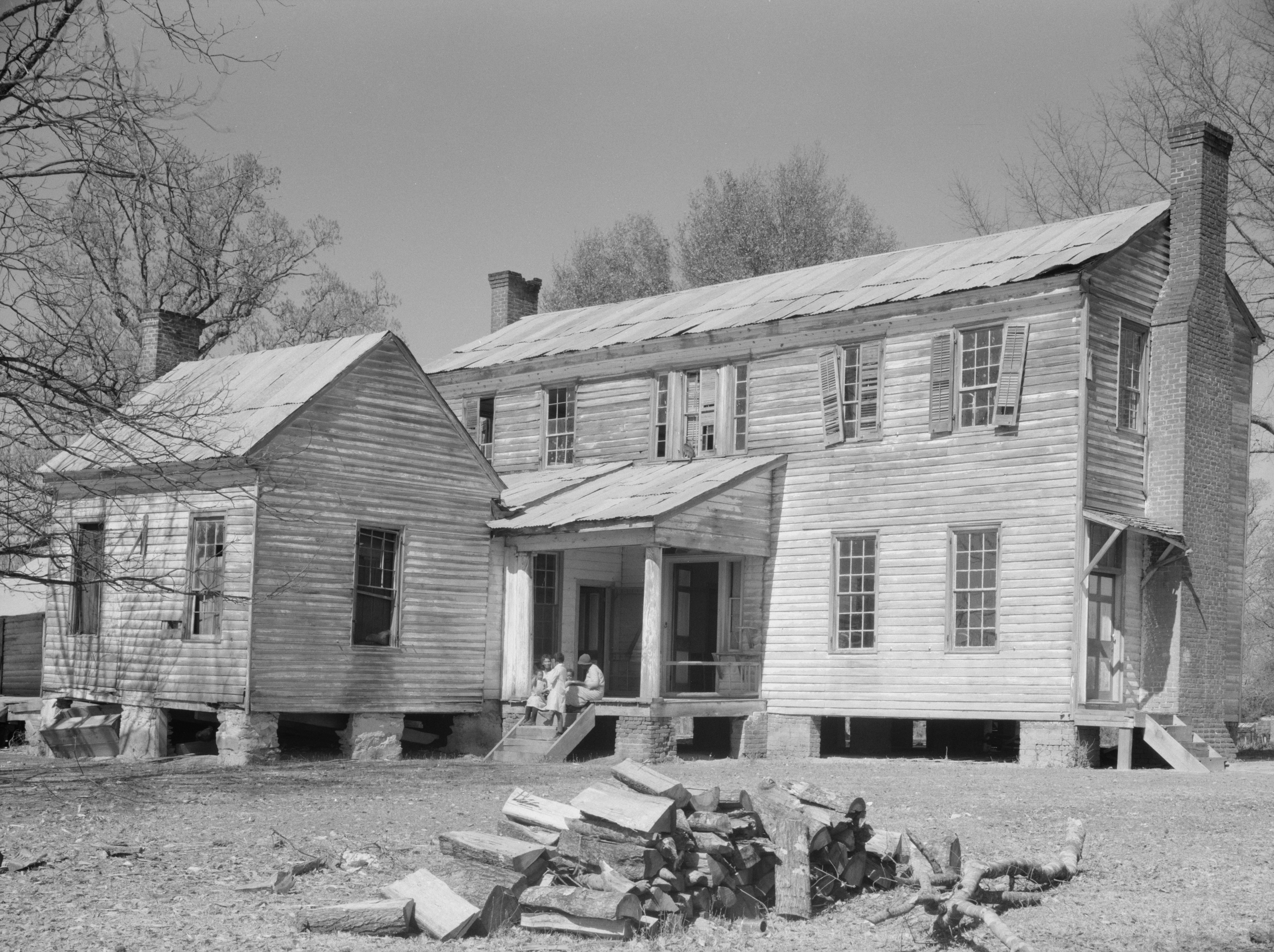
The former home of the Pettways. Gee's Bend, Alabama. April 1937. Photographed by Arthur Rothstein.

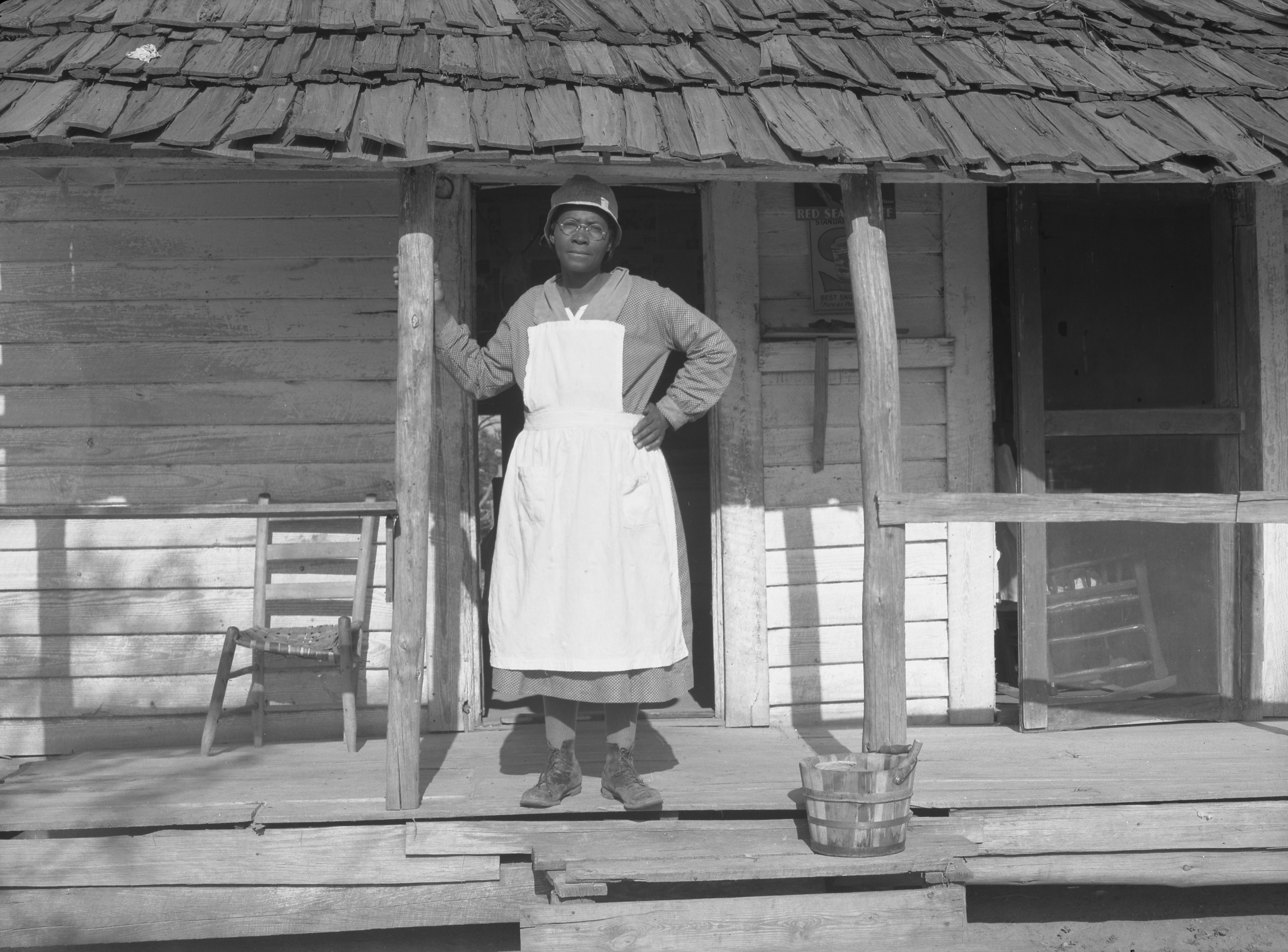
Woman on the Pettway Plantation

In 1940, Rothstein became a staff photographer for Look magazine but left shortly thereafter to join the OWI and then the US Army as a photographer in the Signal Corps. His military assignment took him to the China-Burma-India theatre and he remained in China following his discharge from the military in 1945, working as chief photographer for the United Nations Relief and Rehabilitation Administration, documenting the Great Famine and the plight of displaced survivors of the Holocaust in the Hongkew ghetto of Shanghai.

In 1947, Rothstein rejoined Look as Director of Photography. He remained at Look until 1971 when the magazine ceased publication. Rothstein joined Parade magazine in 1972 and remained there until his death.

He was the author of numerous magazine articles and a staff columnist for US Camera and Modern Photography magazines and the New York Times, Rothstein wrote and published nine books.

Rothstein's photographs are in permanent collections throughout the world and have appeared in numerous exhibitions. A selection of these one-man shows include shows at the International Museum of Photography at George Eastman House; the Smithsonian Institution; Photokina; Corcoran Gallery of Art; Royal Photographic Society, as well as traveling exhibitions for the United States Information Service and for Parade magazine.

He was a member of the faculty of the Columbia University Graduate School of Journalism and a Spencer Chair Professor at S. I. Newhouse School of Public Communications, Syracuse University. Rothstein was also on the faculties of Mercy College, and the Parsons School of Design in New York City, and he took great pride in mentoring young photographers including Stanley Kubrick, Douglas Kirkland, and Chester Higgins, Jr.

A recipient of more than 35 awards in photojournalism and a former juror for the Pulitzer Prize, Rothstein was also a founder and former officer of the American Society of Magazine Photographers (ASMP). Arthur Rothstein died on November 11, 1985, in New Rochelle, New York.

== Personal life ==
Rothstein's parents were Isadore Rothstein and Nettie Rothstein (née Perlstein). In 1947, he married Grace Goodman, and the couple went on to have four children: Robert Rothstein (Rob Stoner), Ann Segan, Eve Roth Lindsay and Daniel Rothstein.

== Gallery ==
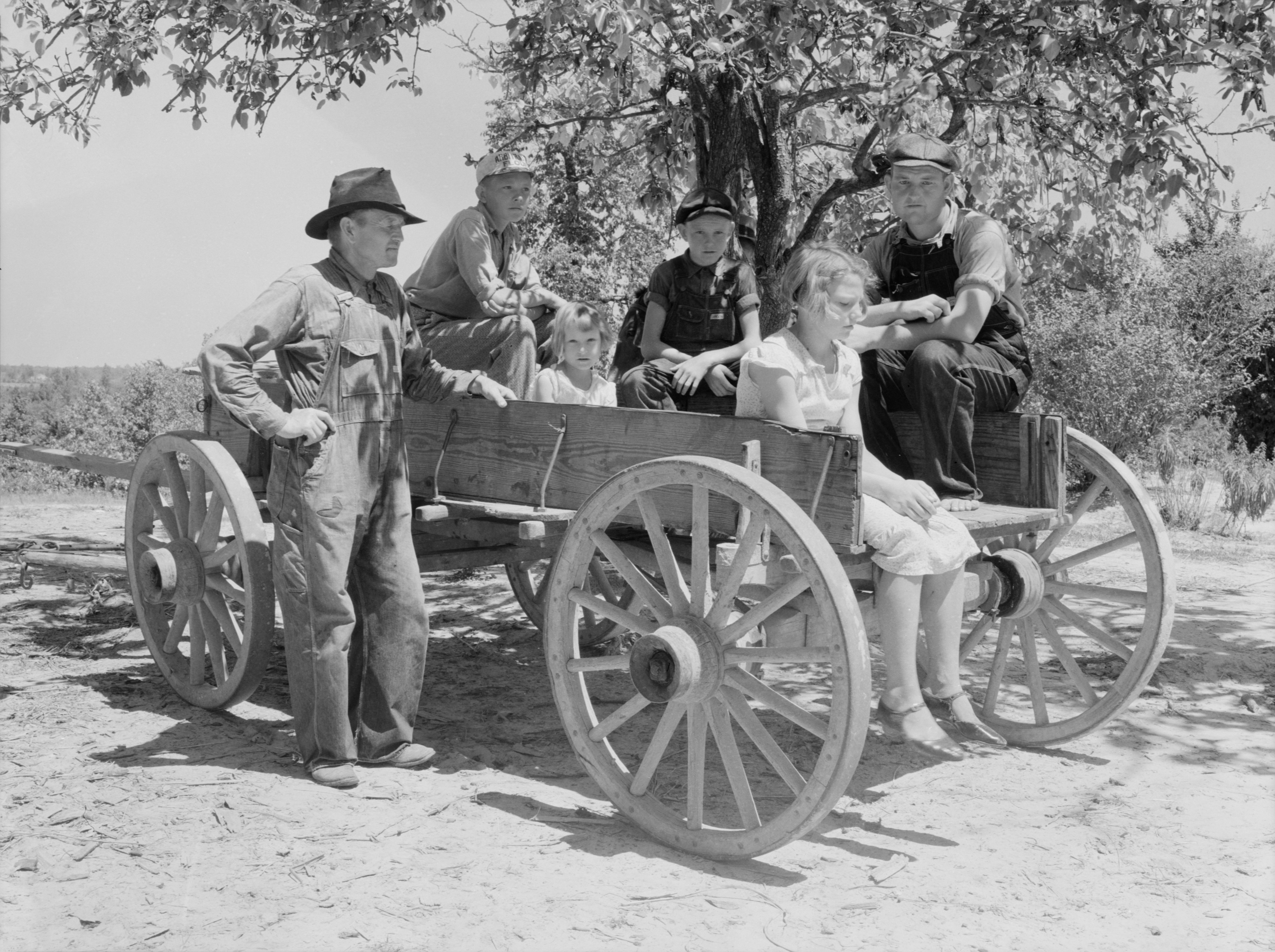
Family in a wagon, Lee County, Mississippi, August 1935

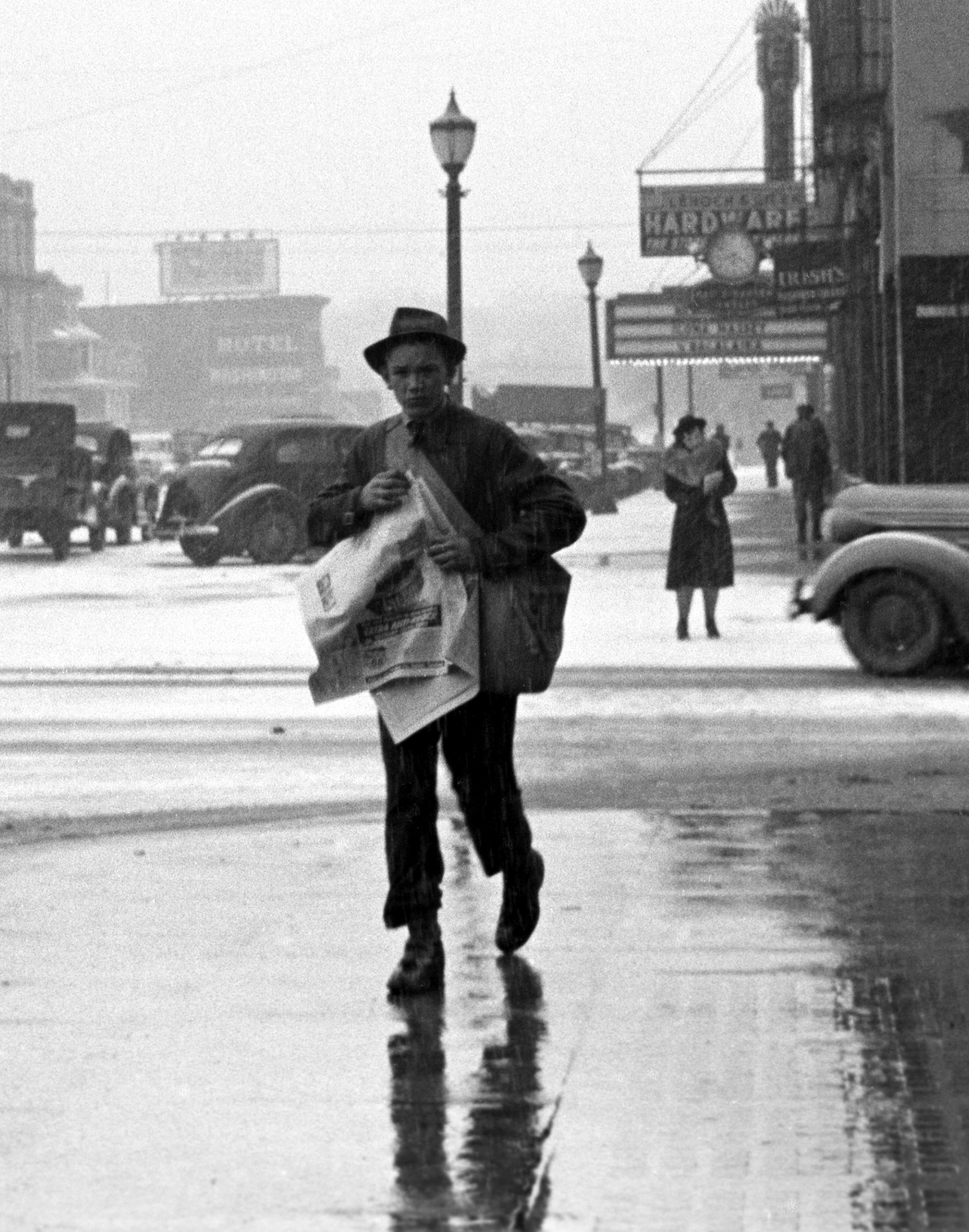
Newsboy, Iowa City, 1940, photographed by Rothstein while driving through town.

Night photo of Rays Hill Tunnel on Pennsylvania Turnpike by Rothstein in 1942

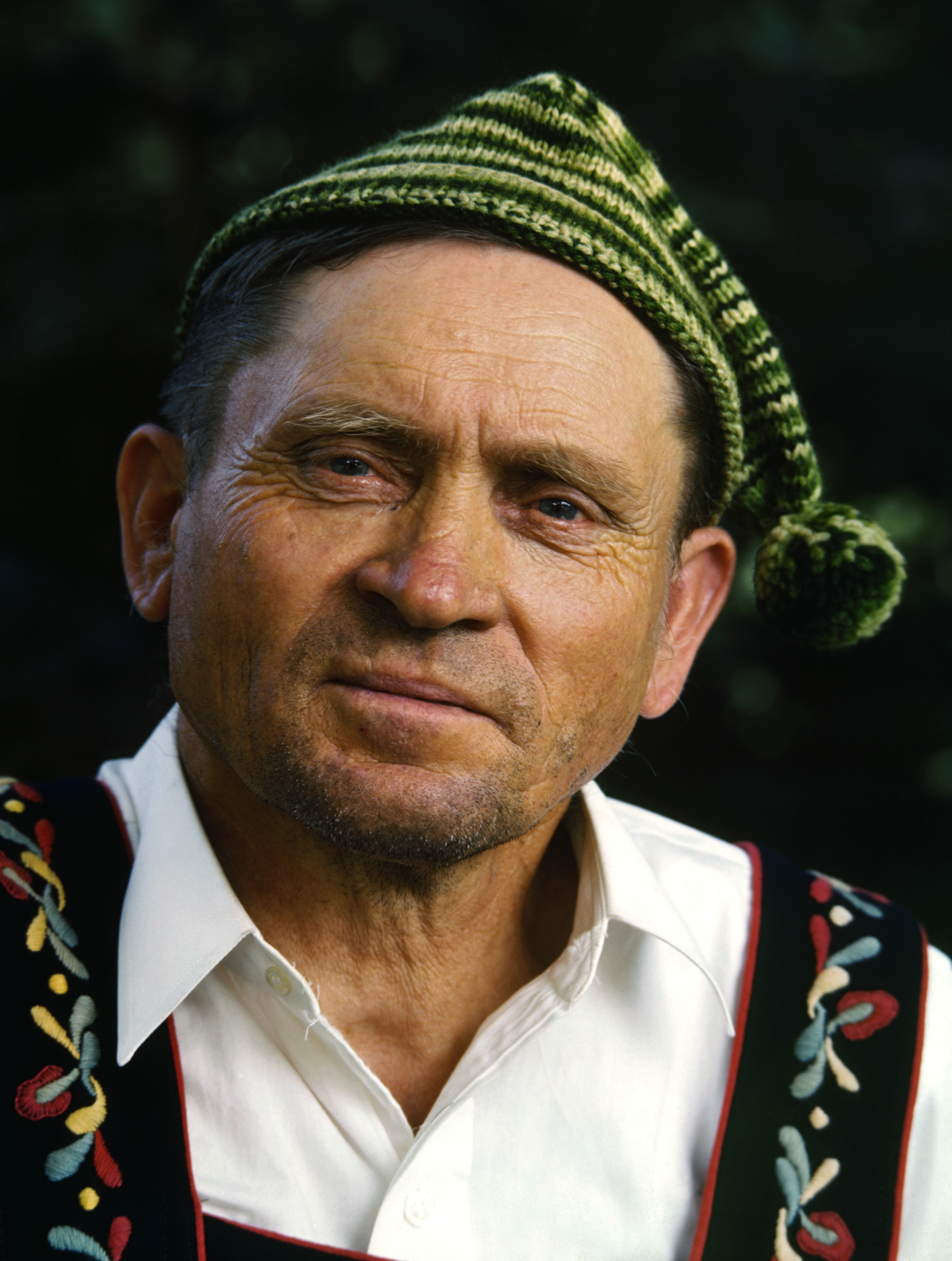
Early color photograph of a guide at Little Norway, Wisconsin. Taken 1943, digitally restored.
