= Cimarron County Courthouse =

- U.S. National Register of Historic Places
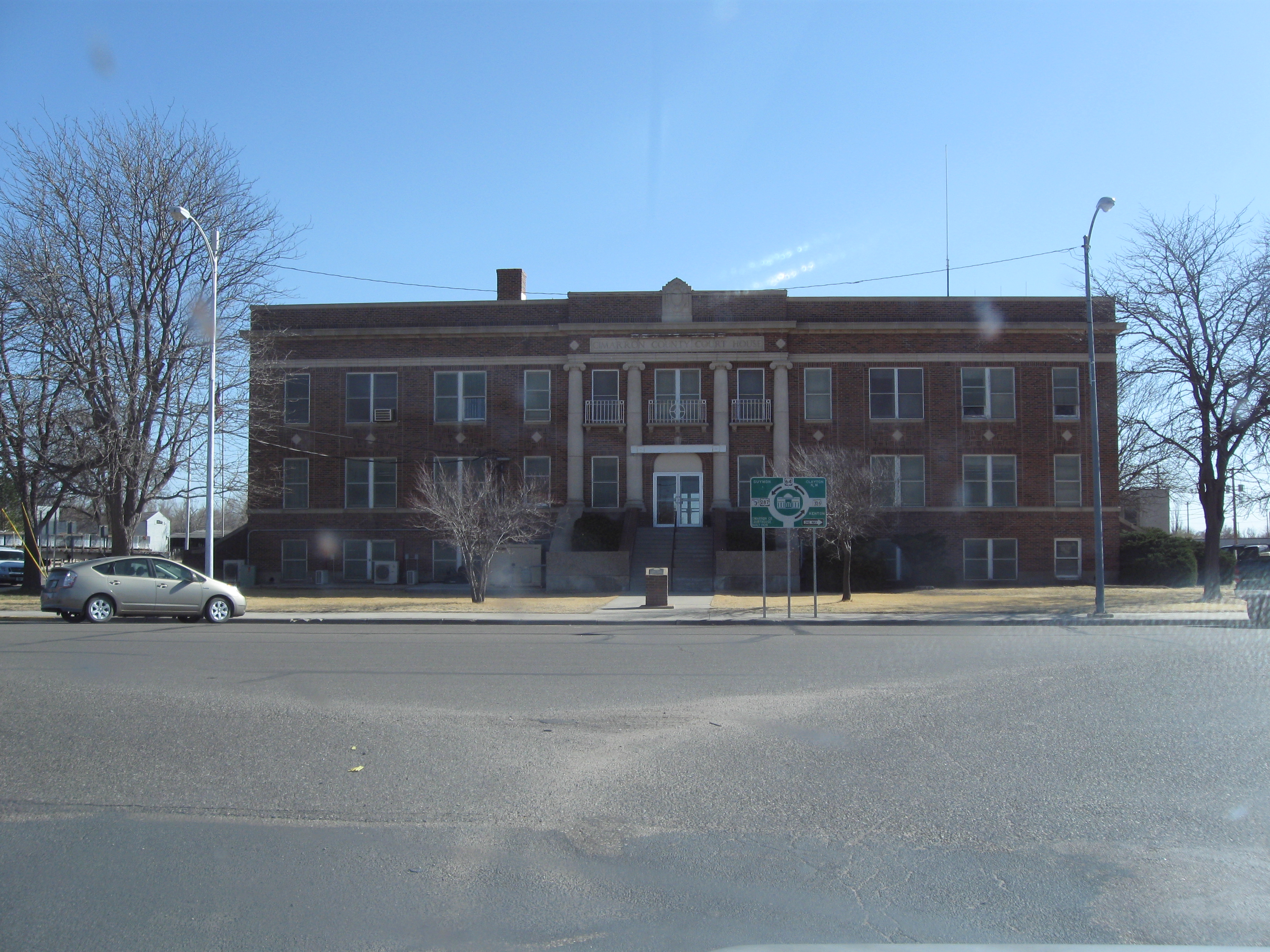

- Location within Oklahoma Location within the United States
- Location: Cimarron Ave., Boise City, Oklahoma
- Coordinates: 36°43′47″N 102°30′45″W
- Area: less than one acre
- Built: 1926
- Built by: Strong & Froman
- Architect: M.C. Parker
- Architectural style: Classical Revival
- MPS: County Courthouses of Oklahoma TR
- NRHP reference No.: 84002988
- Added to NRHP: August 23, 1984

The Cimarron County Courthouse is the historic courthouse serving Cimarron County, Oklahoma, located in Boise City. The courthouse was designed by M.C. Parker in the Classical Revival and Neoclassical styles and built in red brick by Strong & Froman. The building opened in 1926 after the previous wood-frame courthouse burned down. The courthouse is surrounded by a traffic circle that has several highways in a unique example of concurrency, including US-56, US-64, US-287, US-385, US-412, State Highway 3, and SH-325. The highways lead to different locations including north to Colorado, northeast to Kansas, west to New Mexico, and southwest to the Texas Panhandle. On August 23, 1984, the courthouse was added to the National Register of Historic Places.

In 1943, an Army Air Forces training mission accidentally bombed the courthouse. The training unit, which mistook the courthouse for its intended target, dropped six practice bombs near the building. All but one of the bombs exploded, though they did little damage as they were made of dynamite and sand; the city preserved the unexploded bomb. Boise City was once thought to be the only U.S. city bombed by its own military, though similar incidents have since been discovered.
