= Cold Spring and Inscription Rock Historic District =

Historic district in Oklahoma, United States

- U.S. National Register of Historic Places
- U.S. Historic district
- Nearest city: Boise City, Oklahoma
- Area: 2 acres (0.81 ha)
- MPS: Santa Fe Trail MPS
- NRHP reference No.: 94000317
- Added to NRHP: April 21, 1994

The Cold Spring and Inscription Rock Historic District is a 2-acre (0.81 ha) historic district in Cimarron County, Oklahoma, near Boise City, Oklahoma that was listed on the U.S. National Register of Historic Places in 1994. It is associated with NPS Master Plan #122. The district includes a landscape; it includes two contributing buildings and two other contributing sites.

It includes two significant features: Inscription Rock, on the Cimarron Cutoff of the Santa Fe Trail, a rock outcropping with travelers' names carved upon it, and also the Cold Springs Creek Camp Site. The camp site includes a stone building that served as a stagecoach station and a stone spring house.
