= Boise City, Oklahoma =

City in Oklahoma, US

- City
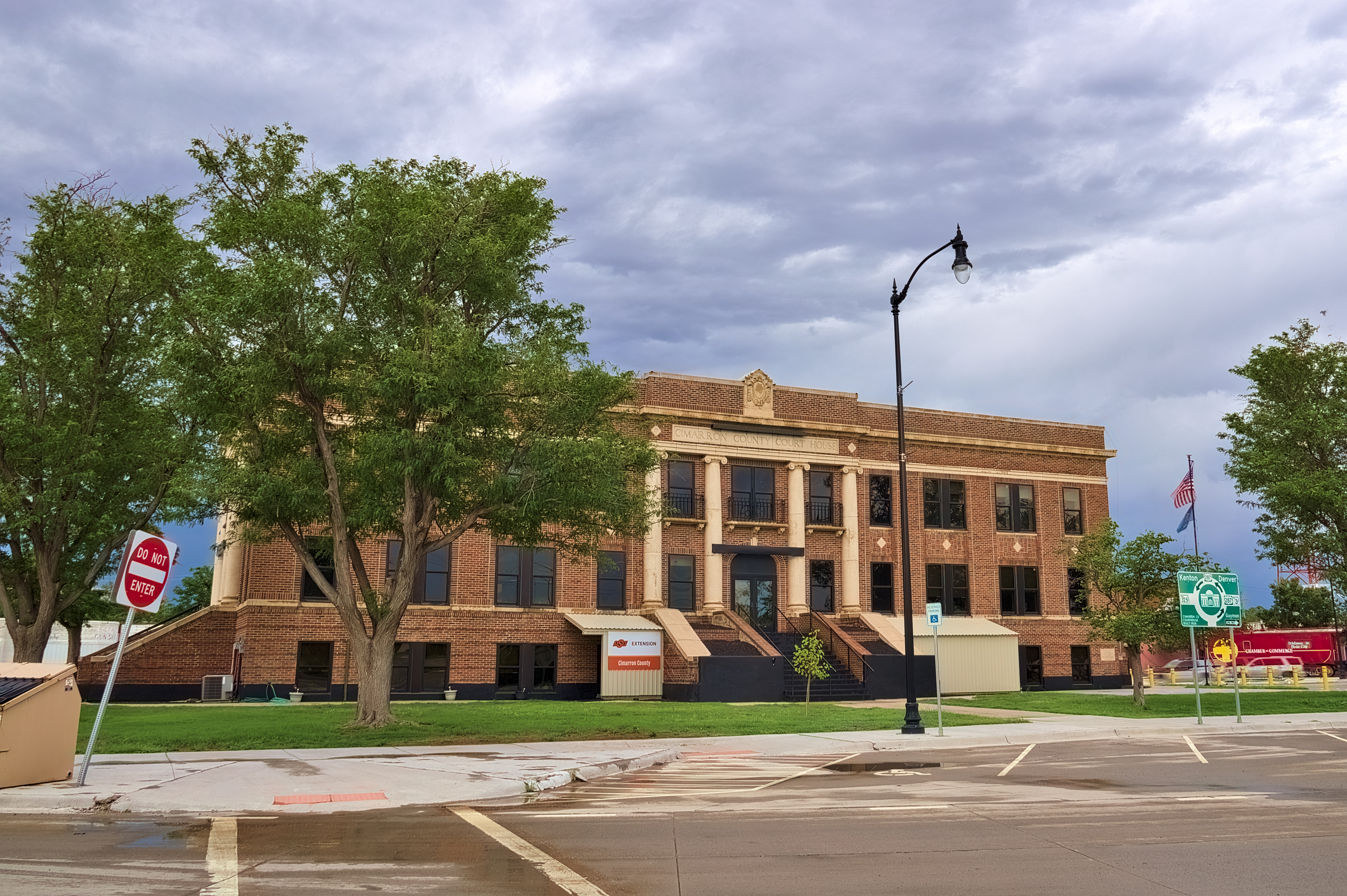
- Cimarron County Courthouse (2024)

- Location within Cimarron County and Oklahoma

- Location within Oklahoma Location within the United States
- Coordinates: 36°43′48″N 102°30′41″W
- Country: United States
- State: Oklahoma
- County: Cimarron
- Founded: 1908
- Incorporated: 1925

Area
  - Total: 1.47 sq mi (3.82 km^{2})
  - Land: 1.47 sq mi (3.82 km^{2})
  - Water: 0 sq mi (0.00 km^{2})
- Elevation: 4,170 ft (1,270 m)

Population (2020)
  - Total: 1,166
  - Density: 790.0/sq mi (305.02/km^{2})
- Time zone: UTC-06:00 (CST)
  - Summer (DST): UTC-05:00 (CDT)
- ZIP code: 73933
- Area code: 580
- FIPS code: 40-07300
- GNIS ID: 1090365
- Website: boisecityok.org

Boise City (/ˈbɔɪs/ BOYSS) is a city in and the county seat of Cimarron County, in the Panhandle of Oklahoma, United States. Its population was 1,166 at the 2020 census, a decline of 7.9% from 1,266 in 2010.

== History ==
Area affected by the Dust Bowl between 1935 and 1938

Boise City was founded in 1908 by developers J. E. Stanley, A. J. Kline, and W. T. Douglas (all doing business as the Southwestern Immigration and Development Company of Guthrie, Oklahoma), who published and distributed brochures promoting the town as an elegant, tree-lined city with paved streets, numerous businesses, railroad service, and an artesian well. (Note: They had claimed before their arrests in September 1909 that three railroads were coming through the town. In fact, no railroad came through town until the Elkhart and Santa Fe Railway (both leased to and a wholly owned subsidiary of the Atchison, Topeka and Santa Fe Railway), did so in 1925. The tracks of that line continued to Felt, Oklahoma, and were extended to Clayton, New Mexico in 1932, but the whole segment from Boise City to Clayton was abandoned in 1942. The remainder from Boise City northeast is now part of the Cimarron Valley Railroad. In 1931, Santa Fe built a new line north from Amarillo through Boise City and beyond. That line, terminating in Springfield, Colorado, is now known as the Boise City Subdivision or the Boise City Sub, operated by BNSF Railway.) They sold 3,000 lots to buyers who discovered, on their arrival, that none of the information in the brochure was true. In addition to using false publicity, the three men did not have title to the lots they sold.

Stanley and Kline were convicted of mail fraud and sent to Leavenworth Federal Penitentiary. Stanley and Kline served two-year terms in the penitentiary. Douglas died of tuberculosis before beginning his sentence. Despite the fraud by the original developers, the town nevertheless took shape and was incorporated on July 20, 1925.

The Encyclopedia of Oklahoma History and Culture says that the origin of the town name is unclear, but offers three possibilities: (1) a Captain Boice who was a hero in the Civil War, (2) the town of Boise, Idaho, or (3) the Boise Cattle Company, which ran cattle in the area. It was speculated in Ken Burns' documentary, The Dust Bowl, that the town name was chosen as part of the original land scam to evoke a false image of the town, as boisé is French for "wooded".

Boise City's prosperity in the 1930s, like that of Cimarron County generally, was severely affected by its location at the heart of the Dust Bowl region.

Boise City was the location of an unusual event during World War II, when it was mistakenly bombed by a friendly U.S. bomber crew during training. The bombing occurred on July 5, 1943, around 12:30 am by a B-17 Flying Fortress bomber. This occurred because the crew performing the bombing practice missed their target in Conlen, Texas, became disoriented, flew in the wrong direction, and mistook the four lights centered around the town square of Boise City as their target. No one was injured in the attack, the town square was deserted, and the total of damage was minimal because only practice bombs were dropped, each of the six bombs containing four pounds of gunpowder and 96 pounds of sand. Learning of their error, the B-17 crew was sorely embarrassed. For the 50th anniversary of the incident, the crew of the bomber was invited back to Boise City, but all members declined, some for health reasons and others because they did not want to draw more attention to their mishap. The B-17's former radio operator did, however, send an audio tape that was played at the celebration.

== Geography ==
Boise City is located at 36°43′48″N 102°30′41″W (36.730115, -102.511419). According to the United States Census Bureau, the city has a total area of 1.3 square miles (3.4 km^{2}), all land.

=== Climate ===
Boise City, Oklahoma

Climate chart (precipitation, max. and min. temperature)
J	F	M	A	M	J	J	A	S	O	N	D
0.5 52 20	0.4 56 23	1.1 64 30	1.4 72 38	1.8 80 47	2.3 90 58	3.1 94 63	3.2 91 62	1.8 85 54	1.5 74 40	0.6 61 29	0.7 51 22
- █ Average max. and min. temperatures in °F
- █ Precipitation totals in inches
Metric conversion
J	F	M	A	M	J	J	A	S	O	N	D
13 11 −7	10 13 −5	28 18 −1	36 22 3	46 27 8	58 32 14	79 34 17	81 33 17	46 29 12	38 23 4	15 16 −2	18 11 −6
- █ Average max. and min. temperatures in °C
- █ Precipitation totals in mm

Boise City experiences a semiarid climate (Köppen BSk) with mild, dry winters and long, hot, wetter summers. A large degree of diurnal temperature variation occurs year-round.

According to weather data tallied between July 1, 1985, and June 30, 2015, for every location in the National Oceanic and Atmospheric Administration's official climate database, Boise City, Oklahoma, is the snowiest place in Oklahoma, with an average of 31.8 inches of snow per year.

Climate data for Boise City, Oklahoma, 1991–2020 normals, extremes 1908–2020
Month	Jan	Feb	Mar	Apr	May	Jun	Jul	Aug	Sep	Oct	Nov	Dec	Year
Record high °F (°C)	82 (28)	86 (30)	91 (33)	97 (36)	102 (39)	109 (43)	108 (42)	107 (42)	105 (41)	97 (36)	88 (31)	84 (29)	109 (43)
Mean maximum °F (°C)	71.0 (21.7)	73.3 (22.9)	80.8 (27.1)	86.8 (30.4)	93.6 (34.2)	100.2 (37.9)	101.5 (38.6)	99.1 (37.3)	95.2 (35.1)	87.7 (30.9)	78.5 (25.8)	71.0 (21.7)	102.5 (39.2)
Mean daily maximum °F (°C)	51.8 (11.0)	55.7 (13.2)	64.2 (17.9)	71.5 (21.9)	80.4 (26.9)	90.1 (32.3)	93.8 (34.3)	90.8 (32.7)	84.6 (29.2)	73.5 (23.1)	61.4 (16.3)	51.3 (10.7)	72.4 (22.4)
Daily mean °F (°C)	36.1 (2.3)	39.1 (3.9)	46.8 (8.2)	54.5 (12.5)	63.8 (17.7)	74.0 (23.3)	78.3 (25.7)	76.1 (24.5)	69.2 (20.7)	57.0 (13.9)	45.3 (7.4)	36.5 (2.5)	56.4 (13.6)
Mean daily minimum °F (°C)	20.4 (−6.4)	22.6 (−5.2)	29.5 (−1.4)	37.6 (3.1)	47.3 (8.5)	57.9 (14.4)	62.8 (17.1)	61.5 (16.4)	53.8 (12.1)	40.4 (4.7)	29.3 (−1.5)	21.7 (−5.7)	40.4 (4.7)
Mean minimum °F (°C)	2.7 (−16.3)	4.4 (−15.3)	12.1 (−11.1)	22.9 (−5.1)	33.9 (1.1)	46.5 (8.1)	54.8 (12.7)	53.6 (12.0)	38.0 (3.3)	25.0 (−3.9)	12.5 (−10.8)	2.1 (−16.6)	−5.2 (−20.7)
Record low °F (°C)	−24 (−31)	−18 (−28)	−12 (−24)	6 (−14)	19 (−7)	31 (−1)	39 (4)	36 (2)	25 (−4)	7 (−14)	−7 (−22)	−17 (−27)	−24 (−31)
Average precipitation inches (mm)	0.50 (13)	0.36 (9.1)	1.10 (28)	1.40 (36)	1.82 (46)	2.28 (58)	3.12 (79)	3.23 (82)	1.75 (44)	1.48 (38)	0.56 (14)	0.74 (19)	18.34 (466)
Average snowfall inches (cm)	7.3 (19)	2.5 (6.4)	7.2 (18)	2.3 (5.8)	0.2 (0.51)	0.0 (0.0)	0.0 (0.0)	0.0 (0.0)	0.0 (0.0)	1.3 (3.3)	3.1 (7.9)	7.9 (20)	31.8 (81)
Average precipitation days (≥ 0.01 in)	2.7	2.6	3.6	4.4	5.9	5.8	7.2	6.6	4.0	3.4	2.6	3.2	52.0
Average snowy days (≥ 0.1 in)	2.9	1.6	2.2	0.8	0.1	0.0	0.0	0.0	0.0	0.3	1.2	2.8	11.9
Source 1: NOAA
Source 2: XMACIS2 (mean maxima/minima 1981–2010)

== Demographics ==
Historical population
Census	Pop.	Note	%±
1930	1,256		—
1940	1,144		−8.9%
1950	1,902		66.3%
1960	1,978		4.0%
1970	1,993		0.8%
1980	1,761		−11.6%
1990	1,509		−14.3%
2000	1,483		−1.7%
2010	1,266		−14.6%
2020	1,166		−7.9%
U.S. Decennial Census

=== 2020 census ===
As of the 2020 census, Boise City had a population of 1,166 and a median age of 40.3 years; 25.9% of residents were under the age of 18 and 23.2% of residents were 65 years of age or older. For every 100 females there were 103.1 males, and for every 100 females age 18 and over there were 98.2 males age 18 and over. The population density was 1,180.6 inhabitants per square mile (455.8/km^{2}) and the 675 housing units had a density of 230.4 inhabitants per square mile (89.0/km^{2}).

<0.1% of residents lived in urban areas, while 100.0% lived in rural areas.

Of the 481 households, 32.2% had children under the age of 18 living in them. Of all households, 45.1% were married-couple households, 21.6% were households with a male householder and no spouse or partner present, and 28.7% were households with a female householder and no spouse or partner present. About 32.2% of all households were made up of individuals and 17.9% had someone living alone who was 65 years of age or older.

There were 675 housing units, of which 28.7% were vacant. Among occupied housing units, 71.3% were owner-occupied and 28.7% were renter-occupied. The homeowner vacancy rate was 3.6% and the rental vacancy rate was 17.5%.

Racial composition as of the 2020 census
Race	Percent
White	69.9%
Black or African American	0.1%
American Indian and Alaska Native	1.5%
Asian	0.1%
Native Hawaiian and Other Pacific Islander	<0.1%
Some other race	16.0%
Two or more races	12.5%
Hispanic or Latino (of any race)	34.4%

=== American Community Survey ===
According to the 2020 American Community Survey five-year estimates, the median income for a household in the city was $42,750 and the median income for a family was $46,350.

== Economy ==
The local economy is based on ranching, farming, and the production of oil and natural gas.

The local paper, starting as the Cimarron News in 1898 in Kenton, Oklahoma, has been known as The Boise City News since 1930. Calling itself the Official Newspaper of Cimarron County, it is available in both print and digital editions.

== Transportation ==
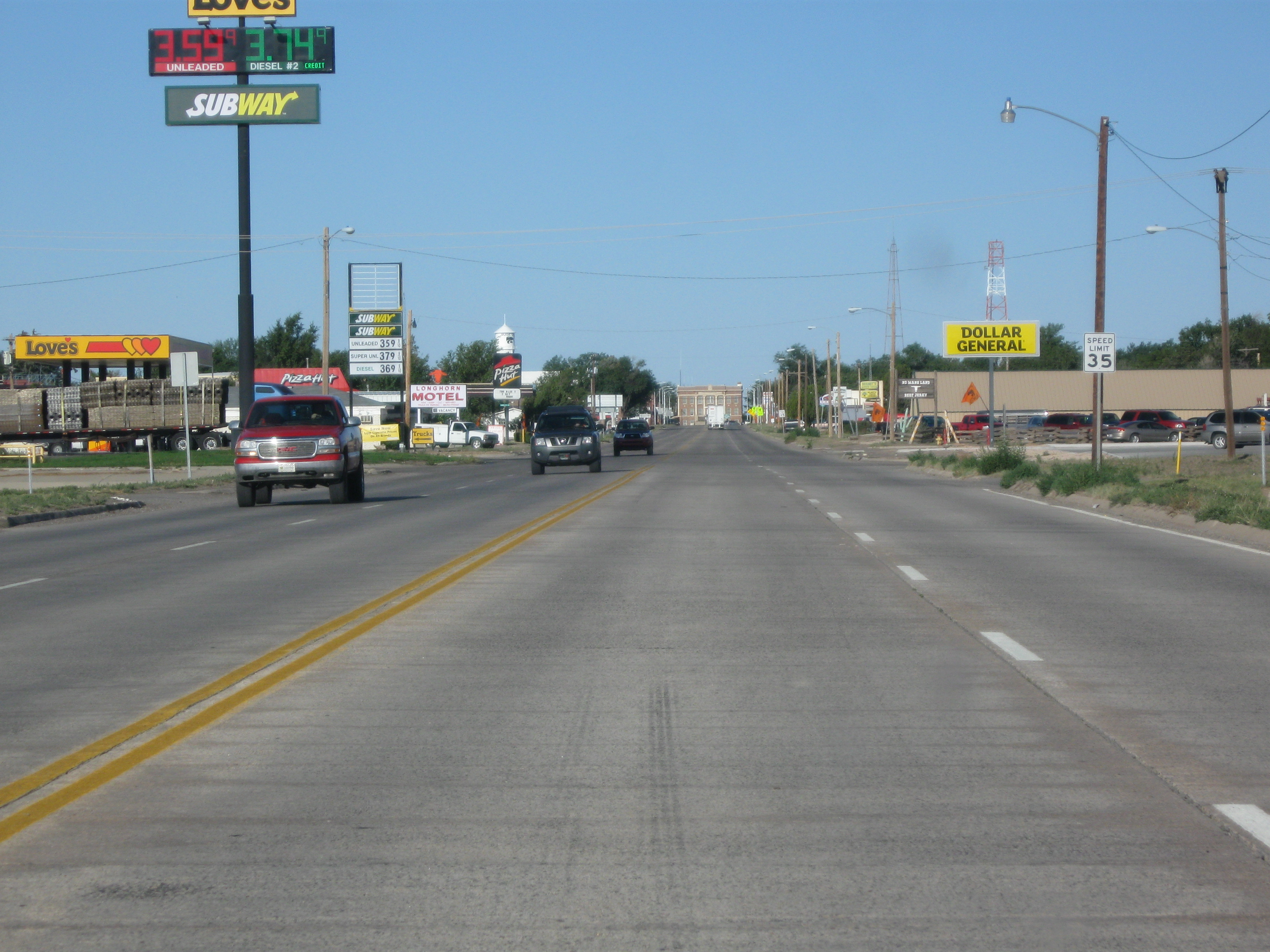
Main highway through Boise City, looking west (2011)

Highways include U.S. routes 56, 64, 287, 385, 412, and State Highway 325.

The Boise City Airport, which serves all of the county, is located about six miles north of the town center.

Commercial air transport is available out of Liberal Mid-America Regional Airport in Kansas roughly 99 miles east-northeast, or the larger Rick Husband Amarillo International Airport in Texas, about 127 miles south-southeast of the city.

Freight rail service is provided by BNSF Railway, as well as the Cimarron Valley Railroad.

== Attractions ==
The Cimarron Heritage Center Museum includes exhibits and artifacts on dinosaurs, the Santa Fe Trail, and other local historic sites. The museum grounds showcase a restored Santa Fe Depot, a blacksmith shop, a one-room schoolhouse, a windmill exhibit, buggies, and more. The grounds are home to "Cimmy" the "Cimarronasaurus", a metal sculpture 65 ft long and 35 ft tall, said to be a life-sized Apatosaurus dinosaur cut-out calculated from the bones of a dinosaur that was actually excavated in western Cimarron County in the 1930s.

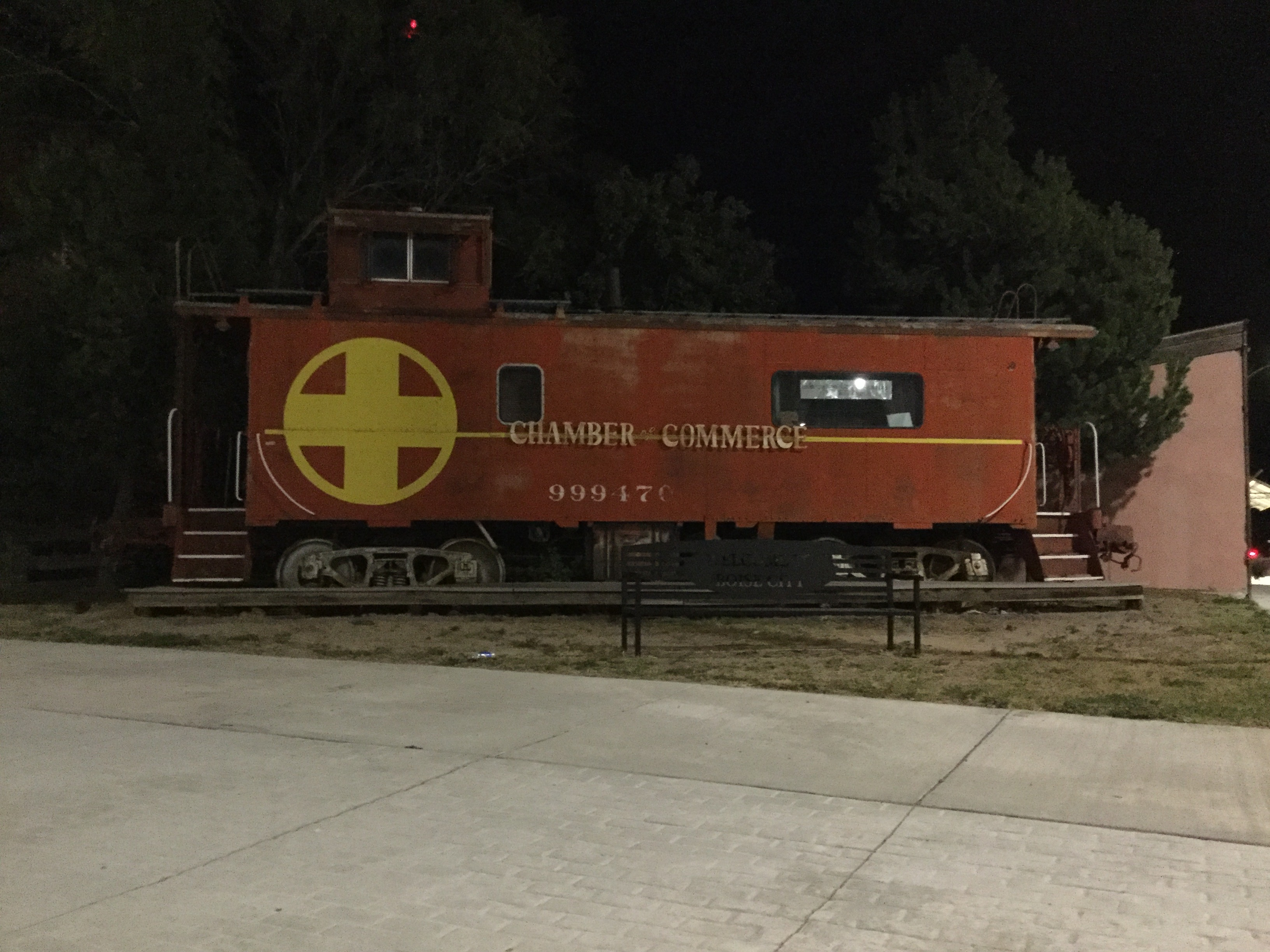
Santa Fe train caboose in Boise City, Oklahoma

The Cimarron County Chamber of Commerce is located in a red train caboose. Out front of the caboose is featured the Boise City Bomb Memorial, commemorating the accidental 1943 aerial bombardment.

Autograph Rock Historic District, containing rutted traces of the Cimarron Cutoff of the Santa Fe Trail, features Autograph Rock, inscribed with the names of travelers from the 1850-1865 era. Access to the site can be granted at the Cimarron Heritage Center Museum. The separate Cold Spring and Inscription Rock Historic District similarly features Inscription Rock with Santa Fe Trail travelers' names inscribed, but also has a former camp site with a stone building that served as a stagecoach station, and a stone spring house.

The Cimarron County Courthouse was designed by M.C. Parker in the Classical Revival and Neoclassical styles and constructed in red brick. It opened in 1926 after the previous wood-frame courthouse burned down.

== Education ==
The school district is Boise City Public Schools.

== Notable people ==
- Vera Miles, actress

== In popular culture ==
Boise City during the Dust Bowl was the main setting for the 99th episode of the horror podcast The Magnus Archives.

== See also ==
- LORAN-C transmitter Boise
- National Register of Historic Places listings in Cimarron County, Oklahoma
