= Cimarron County, Oklahoma =

County in Oklahoma, United States

- County
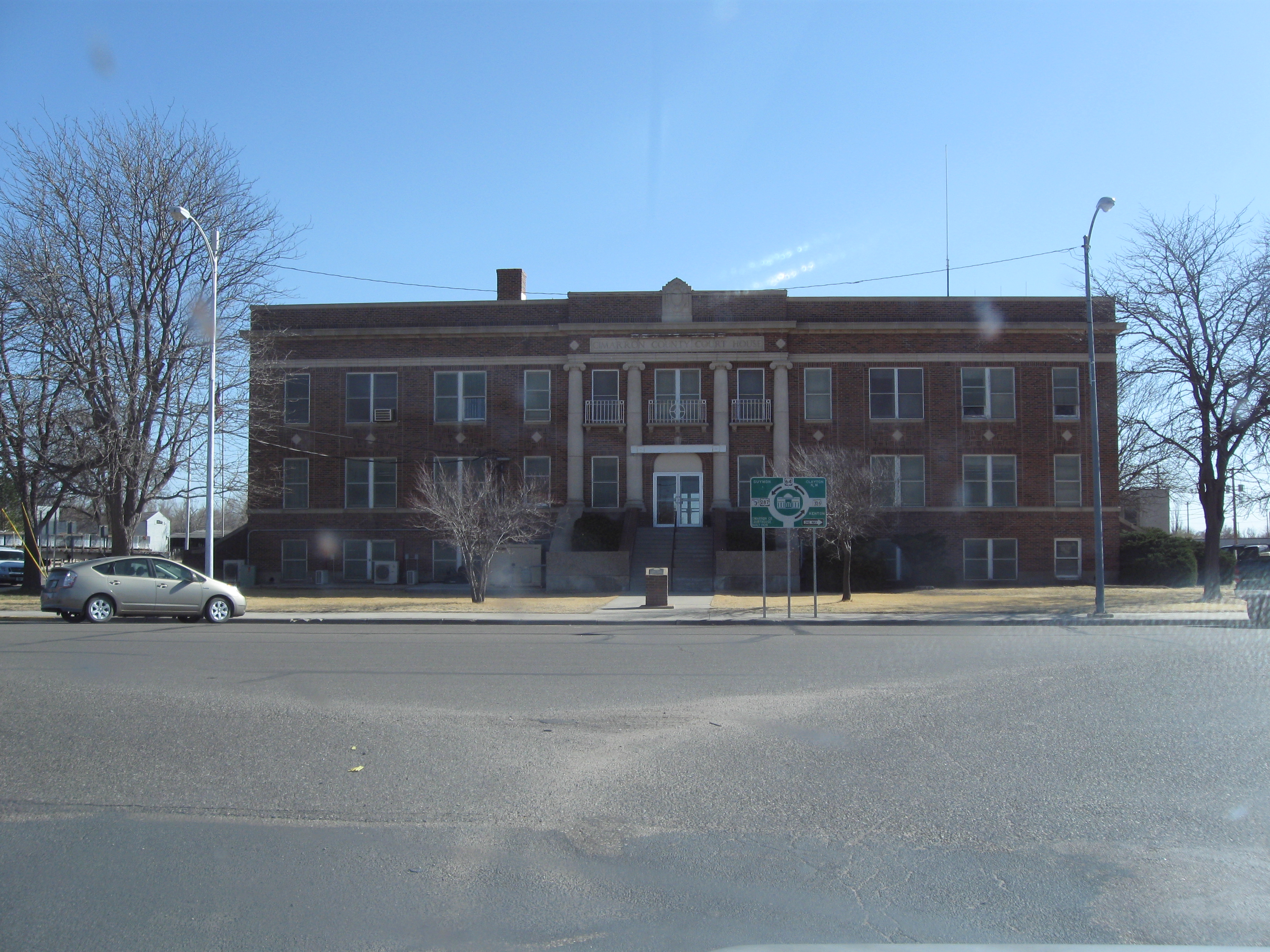
- Cimarron County Courthouse in Boise City (2009)

- Location within the U.S. state of Oklahoma
- Coordinates: 36°44′N 102°31′W
- Country: United States
- State: Oklahoma
- Founded: 1907
- Seat: Boise City
- Largest city: Boise City

Area
  - Total: 1,841 sq mi (4,770 km^{2})
  - Land: 1,835 sq mi (4,750 km^{2})
  - Water: 6.1 sq mi (16 km^{2}) 0.3%

Population (2020)
  - Total: 2,296
  - Estimate (2025): 2,059 ▼
  - Density: 1.2/sq mi (0.46/km^{2})

Time zones
- entire county (legally): UTC−6 (Central)
  - Summer (DST): UTC−5 (CDT)
- Kenton (unofficially): UTC−7 (Mountain)
  - Summer (DST): UTC−6 (MDT)

Cimarron County is the westernmost county in the U.S. state of Oklahoma. Its county seat is Boise City. As of the 2020 census, its population was 2,296, making it the least-populous county in Oklahoma. Throughout most of its history, it has had both the smallest population and the lowest population density of any county in Oklahoma. Located in the Oklahoma Panhandle, Cimarron County contains the only community in the state (Kenton) that observes the Mountain Time Zone. Black Mesa, the highest point in the state, is in the northwest corner of the county. The Cimarron County community of Regnier has the distinction of being the driest spot in Oklahoma ranked by lowest annual average precipitation, at just 15.62 inches; at the same time, Boise City is the snowiest location in Oklahoma ranked by highest annual average snowfall, at 31.6 inches.

== History ==
Cimarron County was created at statehood in 1907. Before the Oklahoma Organic Act was passed in 1890, the area had belonged to what was known as "No-Man's Land", also referred to as the "Public Land Strip". This was a relatively lawless area, with no organized government, and several outlaws sought refuge within its borders. In 1890, the strip became known as Beaver County, Oklahoma Territory. Informally, it was known as the "Oklahoma Panhandle". Only two communities were in the strip. One, Carrizo (near present-day Kenton), had 83 residents in 1890, while the other, Mineral City, had 93 residents. Otherwise, the land was used primarily by sheepherders from New Mexico.

Several communities vied to become county seat after statehood: Boise City, Cimarron, Doby, Hurley, Willowbar, and Centerview. A county election in 1908 selected Boise City.

Railroads came late to this part of Oklahoma. The Elkhart and Santa Fe Railway built a line from Elkhart, Kansas, through Cimarron County in 1925. It completed the link into New Mexico in 1932. Service ended in 1942. The same company built a line from Colorado to Boise City in 1931 and extended it into Texas in 1937. This line still operates and in 2000 was part of the BNSF system.

Cimarron County was affected by the Dust Bowl and was the site of the iconic 1936 photo titled Farmer and Sons Walking in the Face of a Dust Storm.

== Geography ==
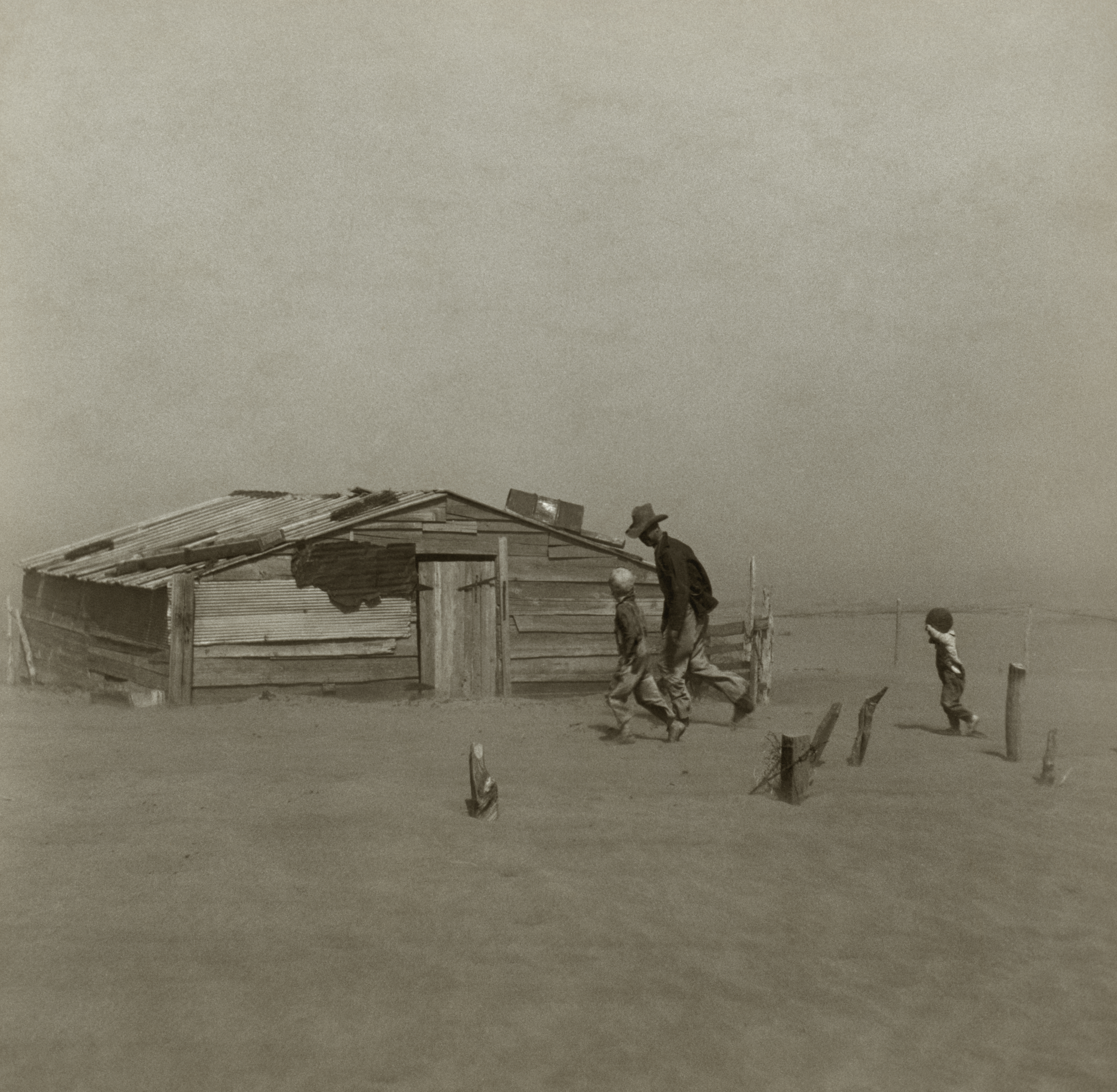
Arthur Rothstein's Farmer and Sons Walking in the Face of a Dust Storm, a Resettlement Administration photograph taken in Cimarron County, Oklahoma, in April 1936

According to the U.S. Census Bureau, the county has a total area of 1,841 square miles (4,770 km^{2}), of which 6.1 sq mi (16 km^{2}) (0.3%) are covered by water. It is the fourth-largest county in Oklahoma by area. It also has Oklahoma's highest point at 4,973 feet (1,516 m) above mean sea level on the Black Mesa.

The northern part of the county is drained by the Cimarron River, which flows eastward, then turns north into Kansas. The southern part is drained by the Beaver River (sometimes also called the North Canadian River). The human-made Lake Carl Etling lies inside Black Mesa Park.

The Boise City Airport (FAA ID: 17K) is about 5 kilometres (3.1 miles) north of town.

=== Major highways ===
- U.S. Highway 56
- U.S. Highway 64 / U.S. Highway 412
- U.S. Highway 287
- U.S. Highway 385
- State Highway 3
- State Highway 171
- State Highway 325

=== Adjacent states and counties ===
Cimarron County is the only county in the United States that borders four states: Colorado, Kansas, New Mexico, and Texas. As a result, Cimarron County is the only county in the United States to border at least five counties from five different states (one from each of the four aforementioned states, plus one in Oklahoma and a second county in Texas).

- Baca County, Colorado (north/Mountain Time border)
- Morton County, Kansas (northeast)
- Texas County (east)
- Dallam County, Texas (south)
- Sherman County, Texas (southeast)
- Union County, New Mexico (west/Mountain Time border)

A location 300 yards (270 m) east of US 287-385 and 1.75 miles (2.82 km) south of the Cimarron River is the only place in the US less than 27 miles (43 km) from five different states: 26.99 miles (43.44 km) from Kansas, New Mexico, and Texas and 7 miles (11 km) from Colorado.

=== National protected area ===
- Rita Blanca National Grassland (part)

=== Images ===
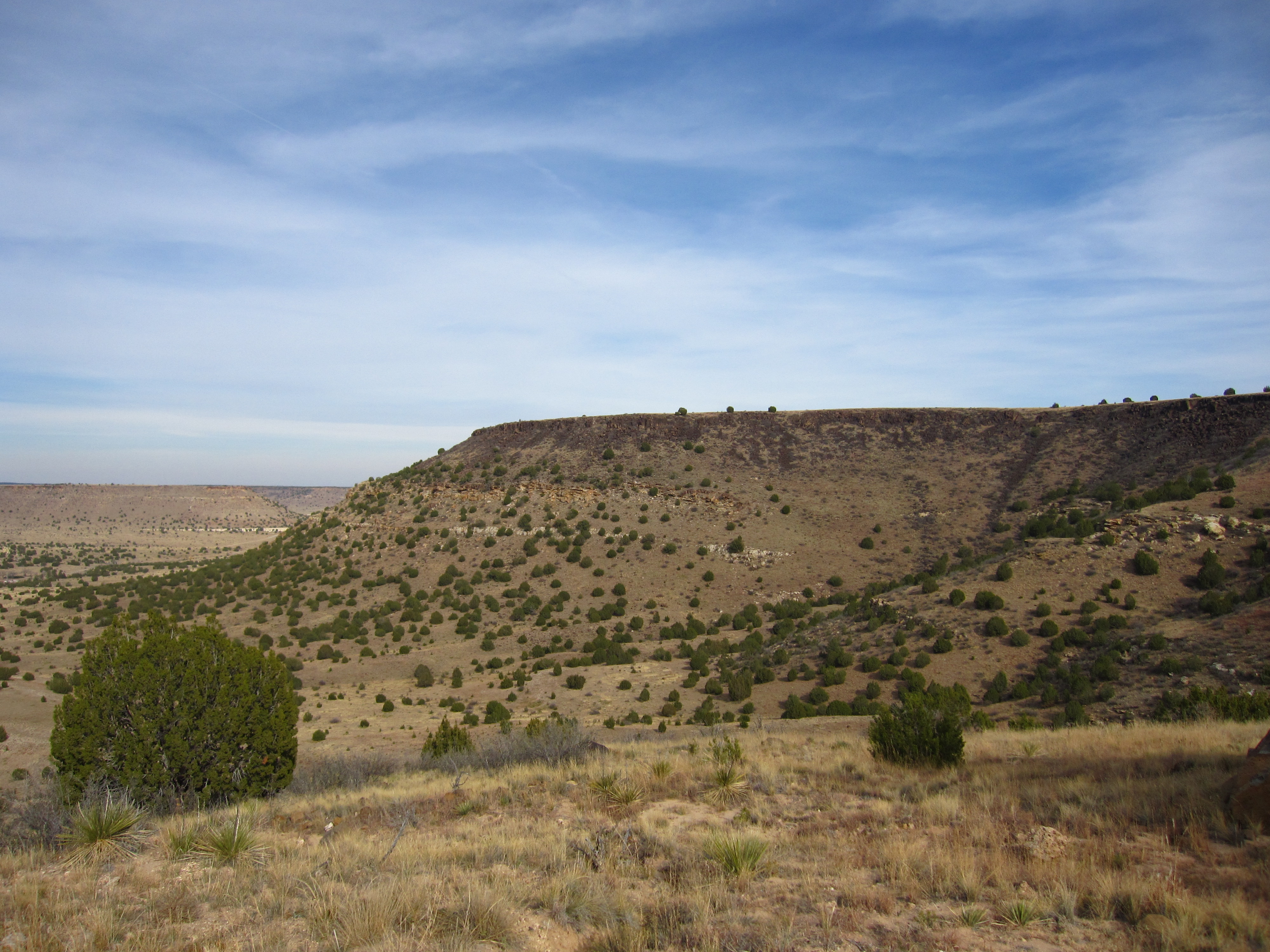
Black Mesa, the highest point in Oklahoma, is in the northwestern corner of Cimarron County.

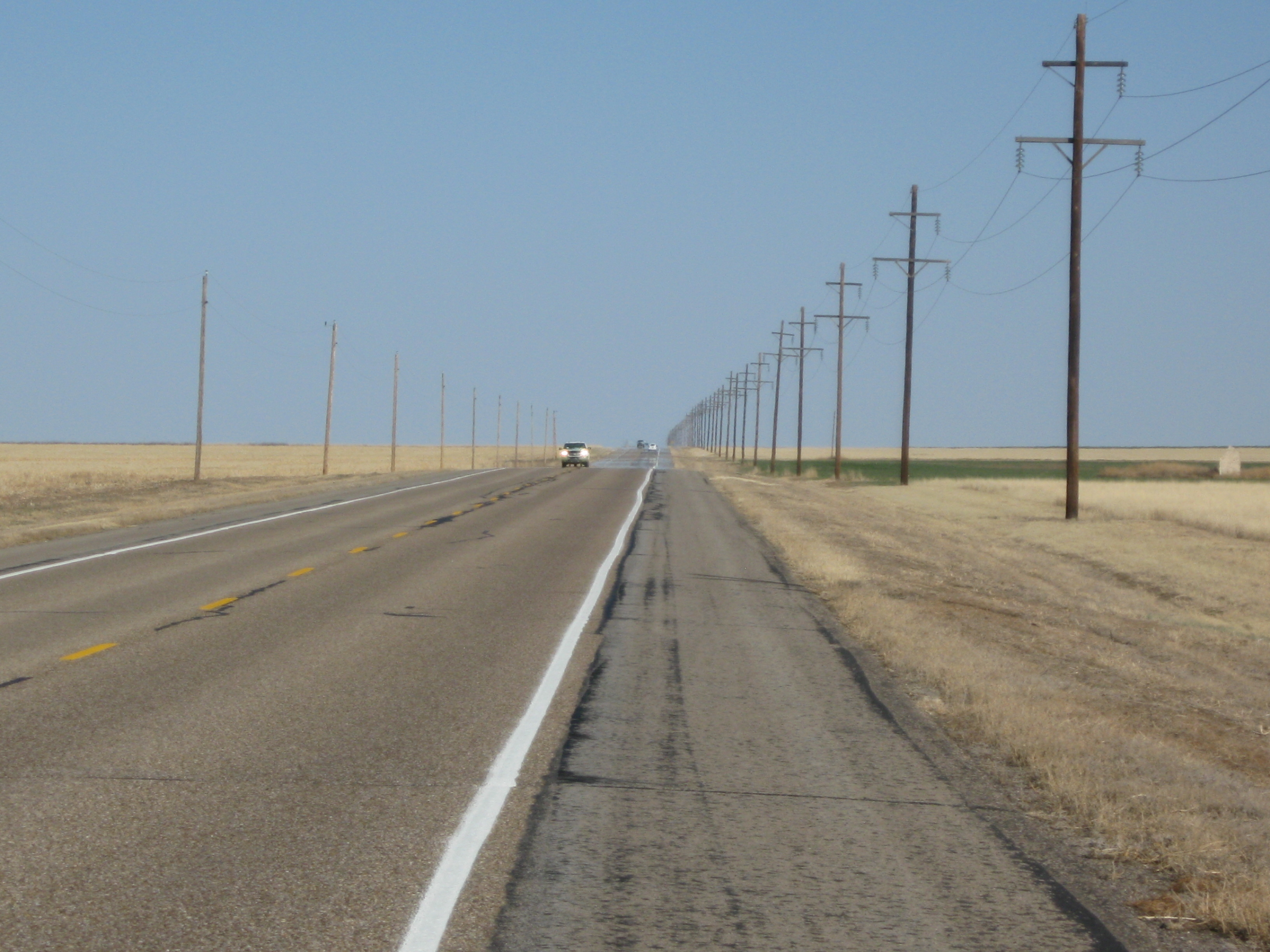
U.S. Route 412 in Cimarron County.

Area affected by 1930s Dust Bowl.

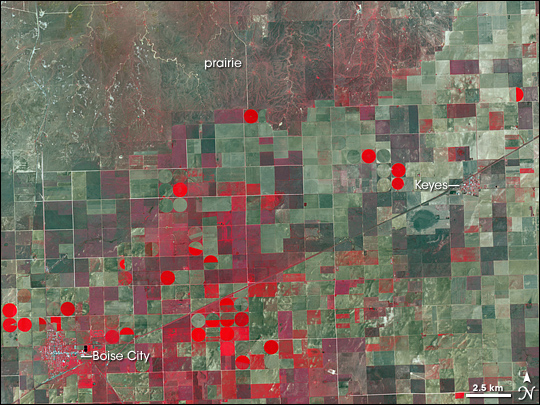
NASA satellite image of Cimarron County, August 2008.

== Demographics ==
Historical population
Census	Pop.	Note	%±
1910	4,553		—
1920	3,436		−24.5%
1930	5,408		57.4%
1940	3,054		−43.5%
1950	4,589		50.3%
1960	4,496		−2.0%
1970	4,145		−7.8%
1980	3,648		−12.0%
1990	3,301		−9.5%
2000	3,148		−4.6%
2010	2,475		−21.4%
2020	2,296		−7.2%
2025 (est.)	2,059	▼	−10.3%
U.S. Decennial Census; 1790-1960 1900-1990; 1990-2000 2010-2019

=== 2020 census ===
As of the 2020 United States census, the county had a population of 2,296. Of the residents, 24.3% were under the age of 18 and 24.5% were 65 years of age or older; the median age was 43.7 years. For every 100 females there were 105.0 males, and for every 100 females age 18 and over there were 101.2 males.

The racial makeup of the county was 78.4% White, none Black or African American, 0.7% American Indian and Alaska Native, none Asian, 11.8% from some other race, and 8.9% from two or more races. Hispanic or Latino residents of any race comprised 24.5% of the population.

There were 970 households in the county, of which 31.0% had children under the age of 18 living with them and 25.1% had a female householder with no spouse or partner present. About 30.4% of all households were made up of individuals and 16.6% had someone living alone who was 65 years of age or older.

There were 1,359 housing units, of which 28.6% were vacant. Among occupied housing units, 71.3% were owner-occupied and 28.7% were renter-occupied. The homeowner vacancy rate was 2.3% and the rental vacancy rate was 13.5%.

=== 2010 census ===
As of the 2010 census, 2,475 people, 1,047 households, and 705 families were residing in the county. The population density was 2 people per square mile (0.77 people/km^{2}). The 1,587 housing units averaged 1 units per square mile (0.39/km^{2}). The racial makeup of the county was 84.7% White, 0.2% African American, 0.8% Native American, 0.3% Asian, 12.1% from other races, and 1.8% from two or more races. Hispanics or Latinos of any race made up 20.8% (16.4% Mexican, 1.4% Spanish, 0.2% Salvadoran).

Of the 1,257 households, 31.30% had children under the age of 18 living with them, 60.40% were married couples living together, 6.00% had a female householder with no husband present, and 30.90% were not families. About 29.30% of all households were made up of individuals, and 15.50% had someone living alone who was 65 years of age or older. The average household size was 2.47, and the average family size was 3.07.

In the county, the age distribution was 27.60% under 18, 6.40% from 18 to 24, 23.40% from 25 to 44, 24.00% from 45 to 64, and 18.60% who were 65 years of age or older. The median age was 39 years. For every 100 females there were 97.40 males. For every 100 females age 18 and over, there were 95.30 males.

The median income for a household in the county was $30,625, and for a family was $36,250. Males had a median income of $24,327 versus $18,110 for females. The per capita income for the county was $15,744. About 13.90% of families and 17.60% of the population were below the poverty line, including 22.20% of those under age 18 and 10.10% of those age 65 or over.

== Politics ==
Cimarron County is a solidly Republican county in presidential elections, and recently the most Republican county in the state of Oklahoma. It cast 92% of its votes for Donald Trump in the 2020 election and nearly the same in the 2024 election, the highest percentage of any Oklahoma county. The last Democrat to carry the county was Jimmy Carter in 1976, and no Democrat has even won 10% of the county’s vote since 2008.

A section of U.S. Route 287 in Oklahoma within the county was renamed President Donald Trump Highway after Trump left office. The Oklahoman newspaper reported in December 2021: "After altering rules and overcoming opposition to pass the state's highway naming bill in May, Oklahoma GOP legislators have yet to provide promised funding for signage along a 20-mile stretch of Panhandle highway designated 'President Donald J. Trump Highway.'"

Presidential election results

United States presidential election results for Cimarron County, Oklahoma
Year	Republican		Democratic		Third party(ies)	
Year	No.	%	No.	%	No.	%
1908	371	43.24%	449	52.33%	38	4.43%
1912	263	37.04%	342	48.17%	105	14.79%
1916	238	30.87%	387	50.19%	146	18.94%
1920	630	53.48%	465	39.47%	83	7.05%
1924	586	41.21%	672	47.26%	164	11.53%
1928	1,139	66.03%	566	32.81%	20	1.16%
1932	571	23.15%	1,895	76.85%	0	0.00%
1936	555	29.06%	1,342	70.26%	13	0.68%
1940	841	45.39%	989	53.37%	23	1.24%
1944	822	52.06%	746	47.25%	11	0.70%
1948	650	42.10%	894	57.90%	0	0.00%
1952	1,438	67.10%	705	32.90%	0	0.00%
1956	1,053	56.46%	812	43.54%	0	0.00%
1960	1,316	65.41%	696	34.59%	0	0.00%
1964	1,225	58.25%	878	41.75%	0	0.00%
1968	1,122	53.81%	436	20.91%	527	25.28%
1972	1,350	71.62%	323	17.14%	212	11.25%
1976	872	46.41%	962	51.20%	45	2.39%
1980	1,404	77.10%	373	20.48%	44	2.42%
1984	1,420	79.15%	359	20.01%	15	0.84%
1988	1,153	70.01%	470	28.54%	24	1.46%
1992	965	59.42%	395	24.32%	264	16.26%
1996	986	67.77%	361	24.81%	108	7.42%
2000	1,230	82.88%	227	15.30%	27	1.82%
2004	1,242	87.10%	184	12.90%	0	0.00%
2008	1,119	88.04%	152	11.96%	0	0.00%
2012	1,082	90.39%	115	9.61%	0	0.00%
2016	963	89.25%	71	6.58%	45	4.17%
2020	970	92.03%	70	6.64%	14	1.33%
2024	860	91.98%	66	7.06%	9	0.96%

Voter Registration and Party Enrollment as of May 31, 2023
Party	Number of Voters	Percentage
Democratic	183	13.30%
Republican	1,057	76.82%
Others	136	9.88%
Total	1,376	100%

== Economy ==
The county economy has been largely based on cattle ranching and agriculture throughout its history. Wheat and grain sorghum are the most important crops. The Dust Bowl devastated the county during the 1930s, and the deluges of 1942-1945 destroyed what was left; the economy had to be completely rebuilt. Oil and natural gas production became important in the 1960s, and a gas plant near Keyes began producing helium in 1959. In 2000, Cimarron County had the ninth-highest per capita income of all Oklahoma counties.

== Communities ==
=== City ===
- Boise City (county seat)

=== Towns ===
- Keyes

=== Census-designated place ===
- Felt
- Kenton

=== Other unincorporated places ===
- Griggs
- Mexhoma
- Regnier
- Sturgis
- Wheeless

== Education ==
School districts include:

- Boise City Public Schools
- Felt Public Schools
- Keyes Public Schools
- Yarbrough Public Schools

== See also ==
- National Register of Historic Places listings in Cimarron County, Oklahoma
- Oklahoma Panhandle
