= National Register of Historic Places listings in Harper County, Oklahoma =

Location of Harper County in Oklahoma

This is a list of the National Register of Historic Places listings in Harper County, Oklahoma.

This is intended to be a complete list of the properties and districts on the National Register of Historic Places in Harper County, Oklahoma, United States. The locations of National Register properties and districts for which the latitude and longitude coordinates are included below, may be seen in a map.

There are 17 properties and districts listed on the National Register in the county.

This National Park Service list is complete through NPS recent listings posted October 23, 2026.

== Current listings ==
	Name on the Register	Image	Date listed	Location	City or town	Description
1	Beagley-Stinson Archeological Site	Beagley-Stinson Archeological Site	November 16, 1978 (#78003394)	Address Restricted	Laverne	
2	Buffalo City Park Pavilion	Buffalo City Park Pavilion	September 8, 1988 (#88001367)	U.S. Route 64; 36°49′42″N 99°38′04″W	Buffalo	Built in 1938 as a bathhouse for the adjoining swimming pool
3	Clover Hotel	Clover Hotel	March 8, 1984 (#84003034)	Main St. and Oklahoma Ave. 36°42′34″N 99°53′41″W	Laverne	
4	Cooper Bison Kill Site	Cooper Bison Kill Site	October 7, 2002 (#02000171)	Address Restricted	Fort Supply	
5	Farmers' Co-op Elevator	Farmers' Co-op Elevator	October 7, 1983 (#83004176)	E. Harper St at SE 4th St; 36°50′03″N 99°37′34″W	Buffalo	
6	Feuquay Elevator	Feuquay Elevator	October 7, 1983 (#83004177)	E. Turner St at NE 6th St; 36°50′09″N 99°37′28″W	Buffalo	
7	Fox Hotel	Fox Hotel	January 30, 1978 (#78002236)	Broadway and NE 1st St. 36°42′40″N 99°53′34″W	Laverne	
8	Harper County Courthouse	Harper County Courthouse	August 23, 1984 (#84003041)	Elm, Maple, 1st, and 2nd Sts., SE. 36°49′59″N 99°37′41″W	Buffalo	First courthouse of county, built in 1927 of red brick.
9	I.O.O.F. Building of Buffalo		July 14, 1983 (#83002087)	110 W. Turner St. 36°50′07″N 99°37′53″W	Buffalo	Demolished
10	Laverne's North Main Street District	Laverne's North Main Street District	March 8, 1984 (#84003044)	Main St. and Broadway; 36°42′36″N 99°53′37″W	Laverne	
11	M. K. and T. Depot in Laverne	M. K. and T. Depot in Laverne	March 8, 1984 (#84003046)	Main St. 36°42′36″N 99°53′28″W	Laverne	
12	Monhollon Artificial Stone House		July 14, 1983 (#83002088)	Off U.S. Route 183; 36°49′34″N 99°37′41″W	Buffalo	
13	Old Settler's Irrigation Ditch		July 27, 1983 (#83002070)	Intersects U.S. Route 283 north of Rosston; 36°56′55″N 99°57′47″W	Rosston	
14	Page Soddy		March 24, 1983 (#83002089)	Southeast of Buffalo; 36°46′08″N 99°32′51″W	Buffalo	
15	Patsy's Island Site	Patsy's Island Site	December 6, 2004 (#04001335)	Address Restricted	Woodward	
16	Sharp Lumberyard	Sharp Lumberyard	March 8, 1984 (#84003048)	124 N. Broadway; 36°42′38″N 99°53′36″W	Laverne	Original lumberyard has been demolished
17	Smith No. 2 Site	Smith No. 2 Site	December 6, 2004 (#04001329)	Address Restricted	Woodward	

== See also ==
- List of National Historic Landmarks in Oklahoma
- National Register of Historic Places listings in Oklahoma
