= Selman, Oklahoma =

- Unincorporated community and Census designated place
- Location within Oklahoma Location within the United States
- Coordinates: 36°48′05″N 99°29′22″W
- Country: United States
- State: Oklahoma
- County: Harper

Area
  - Total: 0.24 sq mi (0.62 km^{2})
  - Land: 0.24 sq mi (0.62 km^{2})
  - Water: 0 sq mi (0.00 km^{2})
- Elevation: 1,729 ft (527 m)

Population (2020)
  - Total: 12
  - Density: 50.5/sq mi (19.48/km^{2})
- Time zone: UTC-6 (Central (CST))
  - Summer (DST): UTC-5 (CDT)
- Area code: 580
- GNIS feature ID: 2805354

Selman is an unincorporated community in Harper County, Oklahoma, United States. As of the 2020 census, Selman had a population of 12. It is about 8 miles (13 km) east-southeast of Buffalo, Oklahoma, the county seat.

== History ==
The first official auction of Selman town lots occurred in late April, 1920, although some lots were purchased, and some building erected, prior to this. The townsite was originally the homestead of one J. B. Fesler. Fesler sold it to J. O. Selman, and Selman sold it to the townsite company, which had it platted and named in Selman’s honor. The town was in a wheat-growing area, and was quickly linked to Buffalo by rail to allow transport of wheat. The post office was relocated from Charleston, Oklahoma after Selman was organized, but retained the name Charleston until September 21, 1923. In the 1920s, Selman had a two-story school, a Methodist Episcopal Church, two groceries, a creamery, a café, a lumber & supply, a variety store, a hotel, a bank, and other businesses.

In the present-day, no rail lines remain anywhere in Harper County, and Selman is not located on any major highway, being south of US Route 64 off N1980 Rd. The Oklahoma Public School District Directory shows Harper County schools only in Buffalo and Laverne.

== Demographics ==
=== 2020 census ===
As of the 2020 census, Selman had a population of 12. The median age was 42.5 years. 25.0% of residents were under the age of 18 and 8.3% of residents were 65 years of age or older. For every 100 females there were 140.0 males, and for every 100 females age 18 and over there were 125.0 males age 18 and over.

0.0% of residents lived in urban areas, while 100.0% lived in rural areas.

There were 2 households in Selman. One of the two households had children under the age of 18. Both households were married-couple households. There were no households headed by a single male or single female householder. There were no one-person households, including anyone living alone who was 65 years of age or older.

There were 7 housing units, of which 71.4% were vacant. All 2 occupied housing units were owner-occupied. The homeowner vacancy rate was 0.0% and the rental vacancy rate was 0.0%.

Racial composition as of the 2020 census
| Race | Number | Percent |
|---|---|---|
| White | 9 | 75.0% |
| Black or African American | 0 | 0.0% |
| American Indian and Alaska Native | 1 | 8.3% |
| Asian | 0 | 0.0% |
| Native Hawaiian and Other Pacific Islander | 0 | 0.0% |
| Some other race | 1 | 8.3% |
| Two or more races | 1 | 8.3% |
| Hispanic or Latino (of any race) | 2 | 16.7% |
