= Charleston, Oklahoma =

Ghost Town in Oklahoma, United States

Coordinates: 36.85583°N 99.43861°W

Charleston is a ghost town in Harper County, Oklahoma, United States.

== History ==
The post office was established June 18, 1901. It was named after Charles I. Eilerts, who was the first postmaster and a merchant in the area. The town was laid out on Eilerts' homestead about 1908. Charleston appears on a 1911 Rand McNally map of the county, located east-northeast of Buffalo, Oklahoma.

At its height, the town had two churches, a school, two general stores, a blacksmith shop and a livery stable, with a population of about 100. However, the town was bypassed by the railroad, and its population declined in the 1920s. The post office was moved to Selman, but retained the name Charleston until 1923. The school continued until 1933. Some of the town's buildings were moved to Buffalo and Selman; others remain.

== See also ==
- List of ghost towns in Oklahoma
