= BFK =

BFK may refer to

- Battelle for Kids, a not-for-profit organization
- BFK (song), by rapper Freddie Gibbs
- BFK (Swiss Air Force), short for Berufsfliegerkorps
- BFK (British Rail coach designation)
- BFK (FAA airport code)
- BFK (IATA airport code)

== See also ==
- Borgward Kolibri, a helicopter design with the official designation "Borgward BFK-1 Kolibri"
