= D77 =

D77 may refer to:

- Neo-Grünfeld Defence, Encyclopaedia of Chess Openings code
- D77 (airport), an American public airport
- HMS Nabob (D77), a Bogue-class escort aircraft carrier
- HMS Trafalgar (D77), a Battle-class destroyer
- HMS Whitshed (D77), a V and W class escort destroyer
