= Page Soddy =

- U.S. National Register of Historic Places
- Nearest city: Buffalo, Oklahoma
- Coordinates: 36°46′08″N 99°32′51″W
- Area: less than one acre
- Built: 1902
- Built by: Shaw, William
- NRHP reference No.: 83002089
- Added to NRHP: March 24, 1983

The Page Soddy, in Harper County, Oklahoma southeast of Buffalo, Oklahoma, is a sod house built in 1902. It was listed on the National Register of Historic Places in 1983.

The National Register of Historic Places said of it:

Of the hundreds of sod houses that dotted the landscape in the Cherokee Outlet after it opened to settlement in 1893, the Page Soddy is one of the last remaining soddies. It is unusual in its use of a shingled hipped roof, rather than a flat grass roof, and in the plastered wall made from local materials. The Page Soddy is one of two soddies still in existence in Harper County, the other being in ruins. The only other known soddy in the Outlet, near Cleo Springs, is maintained by the Oklahoma Historical Society and is already listed on the National Register.

It is located about four miles south and four miles east of the town of Buffalo, which was founded in 1907, after the house was built.
