= Buffalo Airport =

Buffalo Airport may refer to:

- Buffalo Niagara International Airport, serving Buffalo, New York, United States, and the busiest airport in the Buffalo area
- Buffalo Airfield, serving West Seneca, New York, United States
- Buffalo-Lancaster Airport, serving Lancaster, New York, United States
- North Buffalo Suburban Airport, serving Lockport, New York, United States
- Buffalo Airport (Texas) in Amarillo, Texas, United States

== See also ==
- Buffalo Municipal Airport (disambiguation)
