= Buffalo Municipal Airport =

Buffalo Municipal Airport may refer to:

- Buffalo Municipal Airport (Minnesota) in Buffalo, Minnesota, United States (FAA: CFE)
- Buffalo Municipal Airport (Missouri) in Buffalo, Missouri, United States (FAA: H17)
- Buffalo Municipal Airport (Oklahoma) in Buffalo, Oklahoma, United States (FAA: BFK)

== See also ==
- Buffalo Airport (disambiguation)
