= KBQR =

KBQR may represent:

- The ICAO code for Buffalo-Lancaster Regional Airport in the Town of Lancaster, New York
- KQSL, a television station (channel 8) in Fort Bragg, California, United States known as KBQR from October 2010 through May 2011
