= Harper County Courthouse =

Harper County Courthouse may refer to:

- Harper County Courthouse (Kansas), Anthony, Kansas
- Harper County Courthouse (Oklahoma), Buffalo, Oklahoma
