= Buffalo and Northwestern Railroad =

Former railroad line

Overview
- Headquarters: Buffalo, Oklahoma
- Locale: Oklahoma
- Dates of operation: 1919–1920

Technical
- Track gauge: 4 ft 8 1/2 in (1,435 mm)
- Length: 52 mi (84 km)

The Buffalo and Northwestern Railroad was a railway extending from Waynoka, Oklahoma, to Buffalo, Oklahoma, passing through Freedom, Oklahoma. About 52 miles in length, the line was completed in May 1920 and sold to another railroad in June 1920.

== History ==
When citizens of Harper County decided to link their county seat of Buffalo with the railroads, Waynoka was an appealing destination: that locale had been founded in 1888 on the rail line of a subsidiary of the Atchison, Topeka and Santa Fe Railway (AT&SF), and by 1908, it had the largest railyards in Oklahoma. Accordingly, the Buffalo and Northwestern Railway Company was incorporated in Oklahoma on April 10, 1916. However, that company was subsequently reorganized, and in its place, the Buffalo and Northwestern Railroad Company was incorporated in Oklahoma on July 18, 1919. Work was pursued on a line from Waynoka, passing through Woods and Woodward counties and into Harper, with the task completed in May 1920 when the trackage reached Buffalo. The line was about 52 miles in length.

The tracks bypassed the town of Freedom. However, so important was the railroad that the town relocated to be on the line.

The railroad’s independent existence was short-lived. The AT&SF purchased the line on July 1, 1920. Much later, the AT&SF filed for abandonment of 51 miles of the line, doing so on November 15, 1982. This has left Buffalo with no rail service.
