= Lake Evans Chambers =

Fishing lake in Oklahoma, United States

Coordinates: 36.726°N 100.215°W

Lake Evans Chambers, also known as Evans Chambers Lake, is a fishing lake constructed by the Oklahoma Department of Wildlife Conservation in 1965 in Beaver County, Oklahoma, 18 miles west of Laverne. The lake has 80 acres of surface area, and 2.8 miles of shoreline. The lake has a boat ramp, and anglers may find Largemouth Bass, White Bass, White Crappie, Black Crappie, Bluegill Sunfish, Channel Catfish, and Walleye.

== Mexico Creek ==
The lake is on Mexico Creek. The creek, entirely in Beaver County, originates southwest of the lake, and travels generally northeast, continuing past the lake until it becomes a tributary of the Beaver River further to the northeast.
