= Wallace W. Waterman Sod House =

Historic house in Nebraska, United States

- U.S. National Register of Historic Places
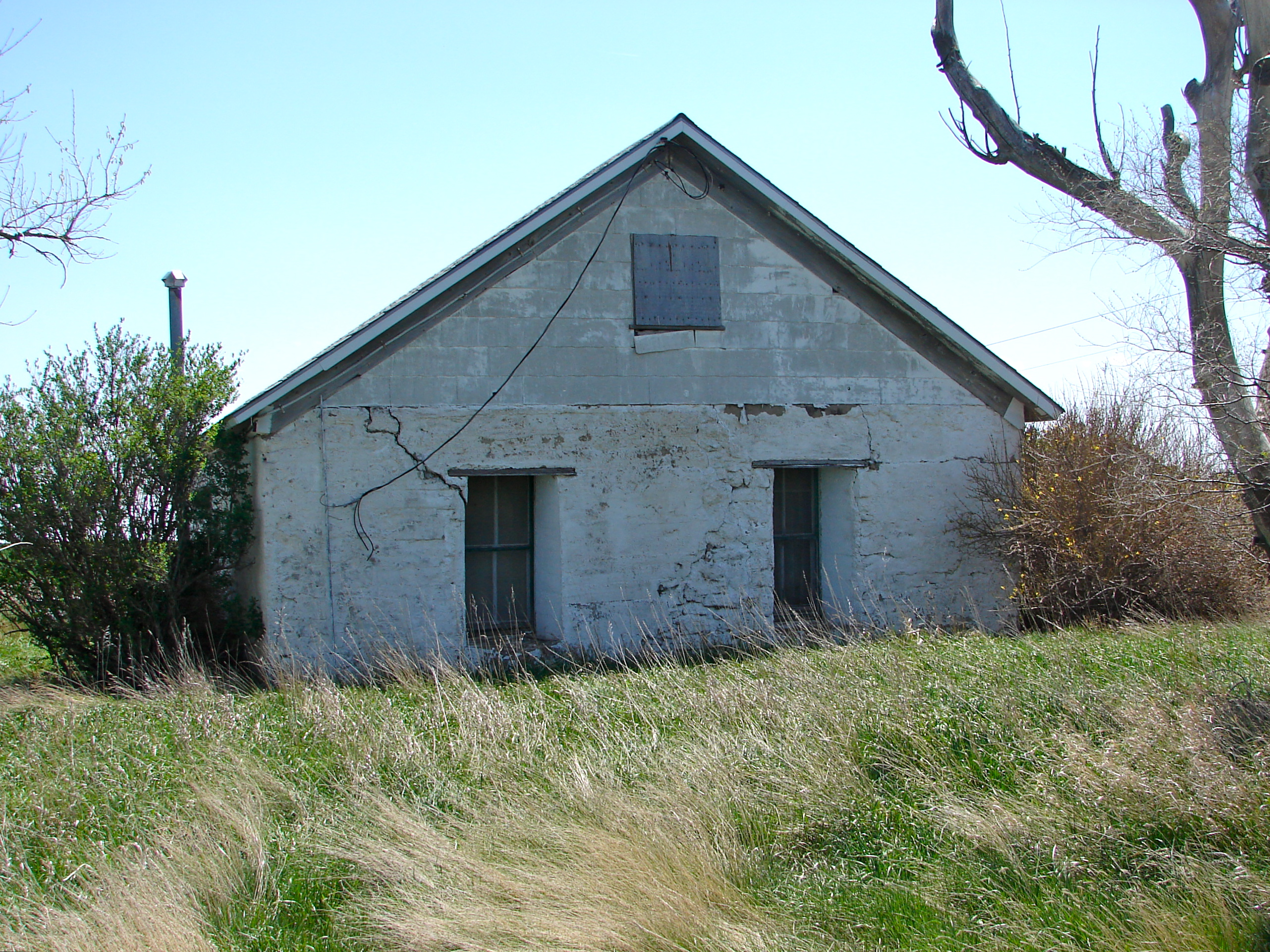

- Location within Nebraska Location within the United States
- Nearest city: Big Springs, Nebraska
- Coordinates: 41°11′22″N 102°4′25″W
- Built: 1886, 1925
- Architect: Waterman, Wallace W.
- NRHP reference No.: 95000096
- Added to NRHP: February 17, 1995

The Wallace W. Waterman Sod House near Big Springs, Nebraska, United States, is a sod house built in 1886. It was modified in 1925 for continued use, including a layer of concrete being applied to the exterior walls. It was listed on the U.S. National Register of Historic Places in 1995. The listing included two contributing buildings, the second being a small outbuilding from 1925.

== History ==
Wallace W. Waterman and his wife, Libby King Waterman moved to Nebraska's High Plains region from Pennsylvania. They built the 25 X 29 foot house in 1886 at the southern end of a settlement known as Day, Nebraska. The house was divided into 3 rooms and had two foot wide walls. Of the three other houses in Day, one was constructed of stone, one was wooden, and the last was also constructed of sod. The settlement also had a Methodist church, a school, a post office (from 1890 to 1903), and a few businesses. No traces of Day or these other buildings survive except for the Waterman house. Modern grain storage facilities are located immediately west of the house, across Day Road. Otherwise cropland surrounds the house for miles around.

In 1925 the house was modified by Virgil and Helen Burke Waterman to prevent deterioration of the sod walls. A gable roof was added with the loft being divided into two bedrooms. A 10 X 16 foot porch and a cistern were added to the southern side and the walls were covered in concrete. A cellar was dug beneath the kitchen. The improvements did not include running water, but the kitchen was equipped with a hand pump for water and a modern stove.

Members of the Waterman family lived in the house until 1989. In 1993 the house was donated to the Deuel County Historical Society with the provision that it be used for historical or educational purposes.

A roadside historical marker describing the house is located nine miles south of the house in Big Springs.

In 1994 the Nebraska Historic Buildings Survey knew of 14 other extant sod houses in the High Plains region. All but one had their exterior walls covered with stucco or concrete for protection. Only four were still being used as residences.
