= Jackson–Einspahr Sod House =

Historic house in Nebraska, United States

- U.S. National Register of Historic Places
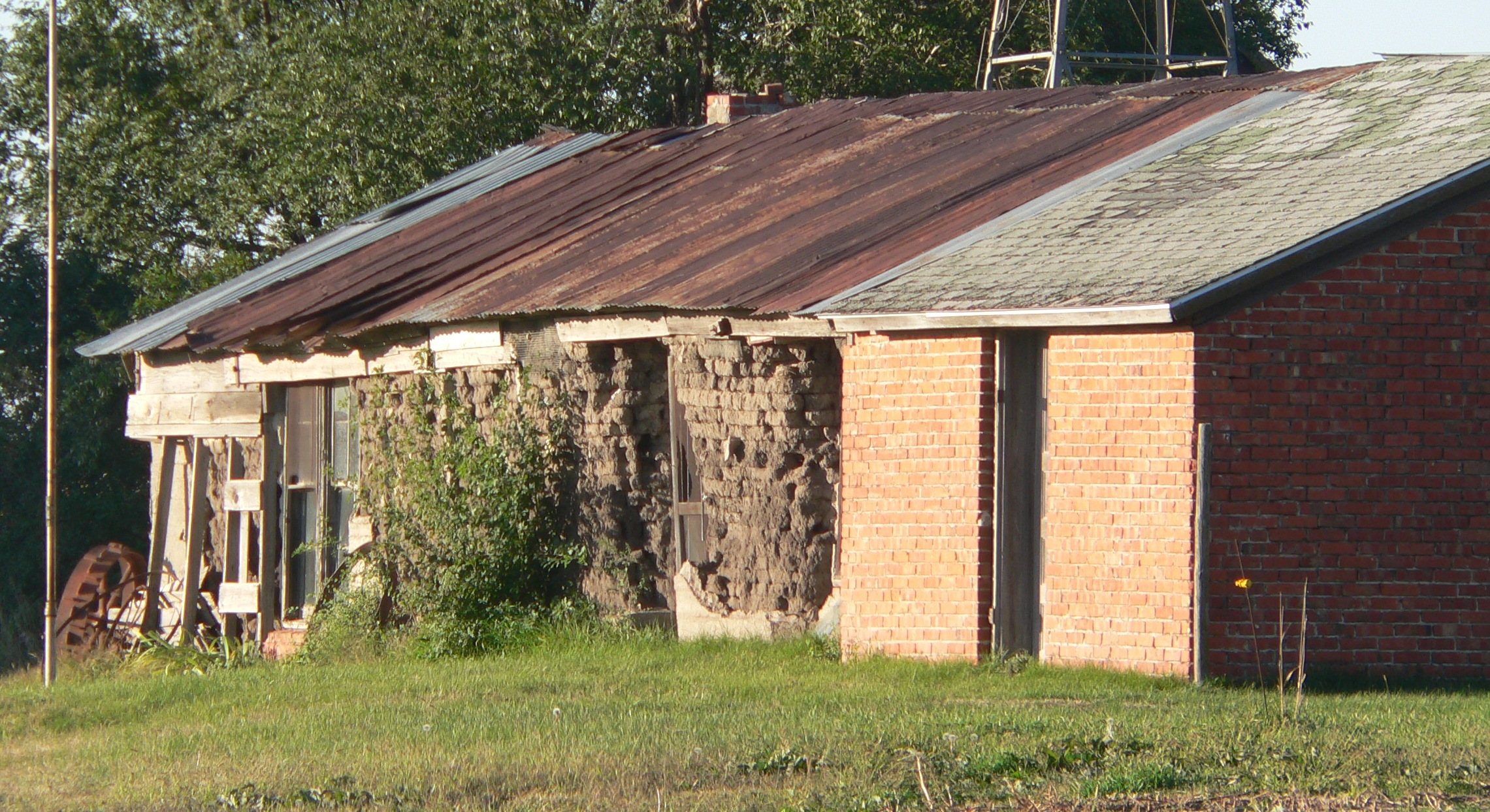
- View from the northeast
- Nearest city: Holstein, Nebraska
- Area: less than one acre
- Built: 1881
- Architect: Jackson, Silas; Einspahr, John
- NRHP reference No.: 06000994
- Added to NRHP: November 8, 2006

The Jackson–Einspahr Sod House near Holstein, Nebraska, United States, is a sod house that was built in phases between 1881 and 1910. It was listed on the U.S. National Register of Historic Places in 2006.
