= Sod house =

Turf house used in early colonial North America

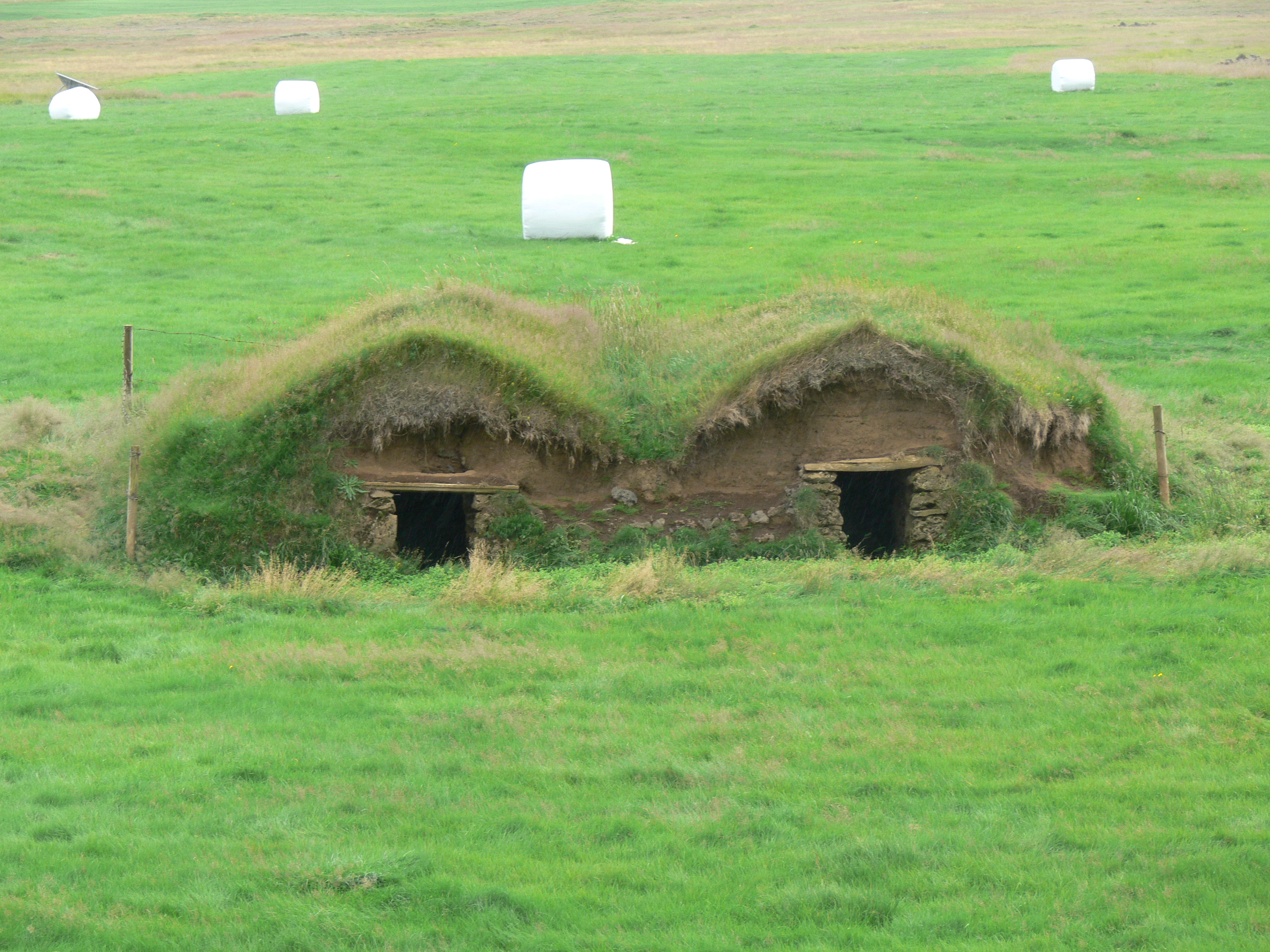
A sod farm structure in Iceland

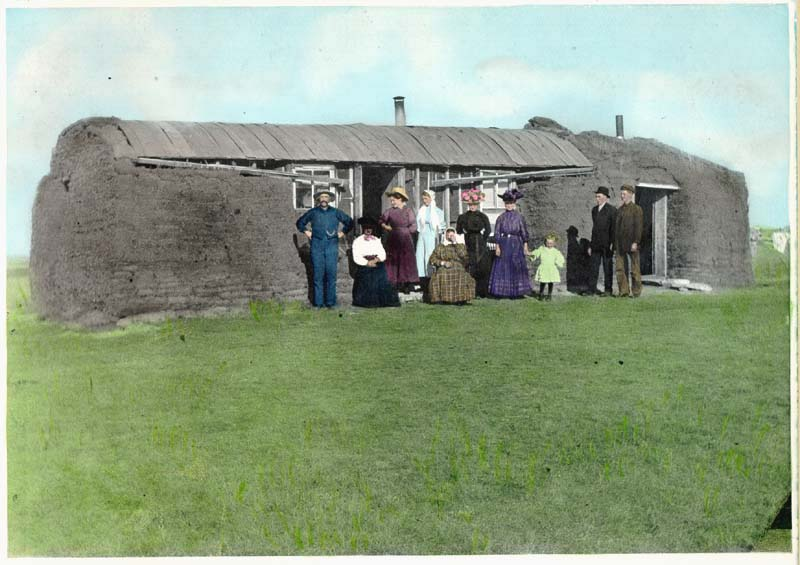
Saskatchewan sod house, circa 1900

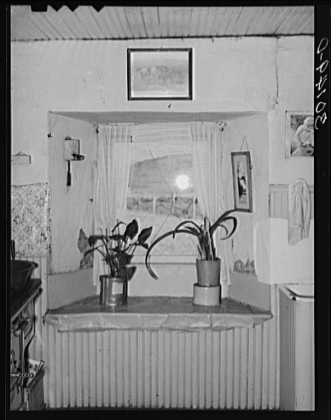
Unusually well appointed interior of a sod house, North Dakota, 1937

The sod house or soddy was a common alternative to the log cabin during frontier settlement of the Great Plains of North America in the 19th century and the early 20th century. Primarily used at first for animal shelters, corrals, and fences, they came into use also to house humans, for the prairie often lacked standard building materials such as wood or stone, while sod from thickly rooted prairie grass was abundant and free and could be used for house construction. Prairie grass has a much thicker, tougher root structure than a modern lawn.

Construction of a sod house involved cutting patches of sod in triangles and piling them into walls. Builders employed a variety of roofing methods. Sod houses accommodated normal doors and windows. The resulting structure featured less expensive materials and was quicker to build than a wood-frame house, but required frequent maintenance and was vulnerable to rain damage, especially if the roof was also primarily of sod. Stucco was sometimes used to protect the outer walls. Canvas or stucco often lined the interior walls. There is a variety of designs, including a type built by Mennonites in Prussia, Russia, and Canada called a semlin and another in Alaska known as a barabara.

== Notable sod houses ==
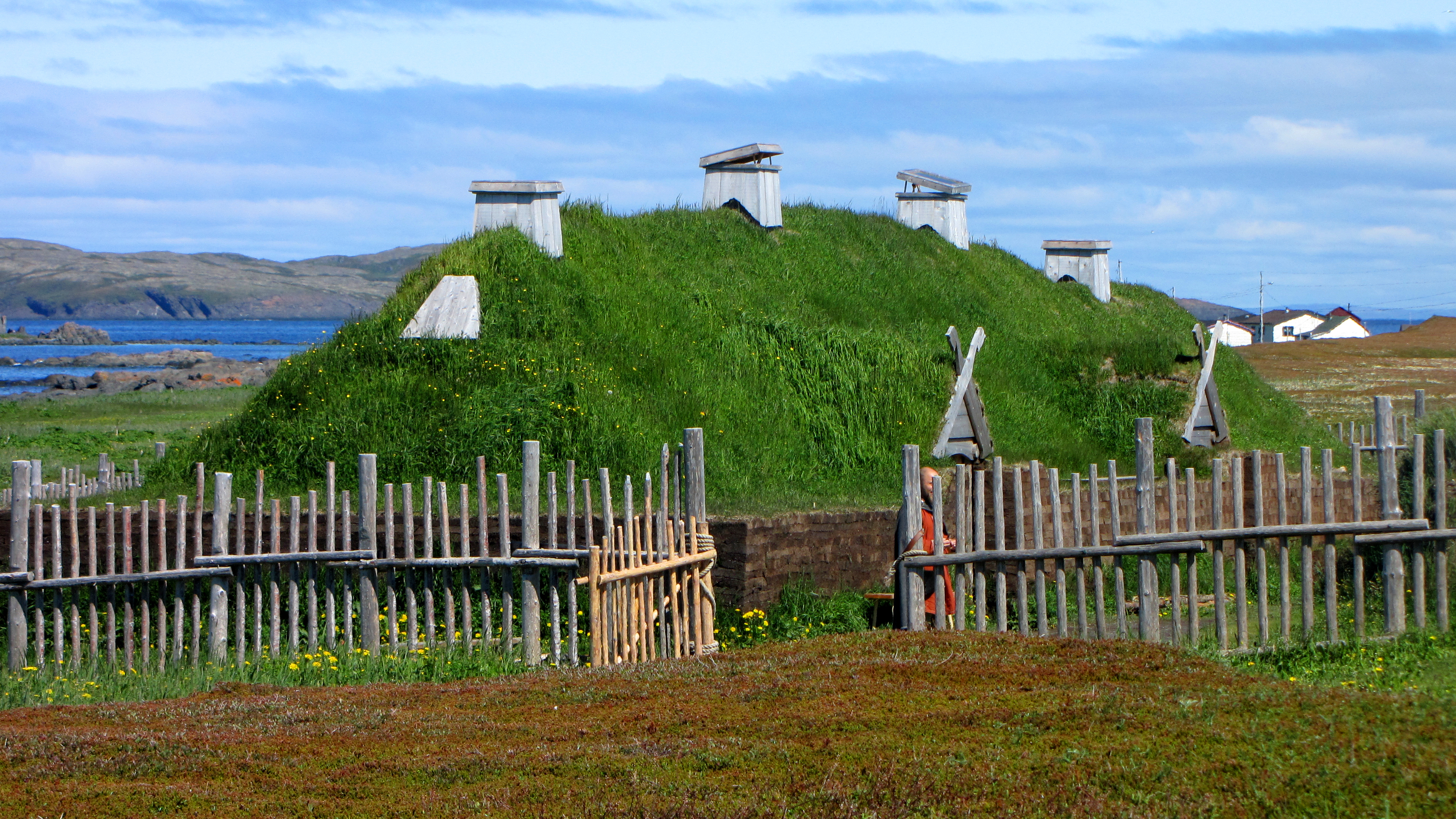
A Norse sod longhouse recreation at L'Anse aux Meadows

Sod houses that are individually notable and historic sites that include one or more sod houses or other sod structures include:

Iceland

- Skagafjörður Folk Museum, turf/sod houses of the burstabær style in Glaumbær.
- Arbaer Folk Museum.

Canada

- Addison Sod House, a Canadian National Historic Landmark building, in Saskatchewan.
- L'Anse aux Meadows, the site of the pioneering 10th–11th century CE Norse settlement near the northern tip of Newfoundland, has reconstructions of eight sod houses in their original locations, used for various purposes when built by Norse settlers there a millennium ago.
- The Mennonite Heritage Village in Steinbach, Manitoba contains a Mennonite-style sod hut known as a semlin

United States

- Cottonwood Ranch, Sheridan County, Kansas. The ranch site, listed in the National Register of Historic Places (NRHP), included a sod stable.
- Dowse Sod House, near Comstock, Nebraska; NRHP-listed and operated as museum.
- Heman Gibbs Farmstead, Falcon Heights, Minnesota; the NRHP-listed site includes a replica of the original 1849 sod house.
- Jackson-Einspahr Sod House, Holstein, Nebraska, NRHP-listed.
- Leffingwell Camp Site, Flaxman Island, Alaska, listed on the U.S. National Register of Historic Places (NRHP).
- Minor Sod House, McDonald, Kansas, NRHP-listed.
- Page Soddy, Harper County, Oklahoma, NRHP-listed.
- Pioneer Sod House, Wheat Ridge, Colorado, NRHP-listed.
- Gustav Rohrich Sod House, Bellwood, Nebraska, NRHP-listed.
- Sod House (Cleo Springs, Oklahoma), also known as Marshall McCully Sod House, NRHP-listed.
- Sod House Ranch, Burns, Oregon (does not include a sod house).
- Wallace W. Waterman Sod House, Big Springs, Nebraska, NRHP-listed.

The Netherlands

- Netherlands Open Air Museum near Arnhem.
- De Spitkeet in Harkema is an open air museum reconstructing how people used to live in the area.
- Ellert en Brammert, a museum in Drenthe with multiple sod houses.

== See also ==
- Burdei
- Canadian Prairies
- Dugout (shelter)
- Earth lodge
- Earth structure
- Earth shelter
- Icelandic turf houses
- Rammed earth
- Sod roof
- Vernacular architecture
