= Buffalo City Park Pavilion =

- U.S. National Register of Historic Places
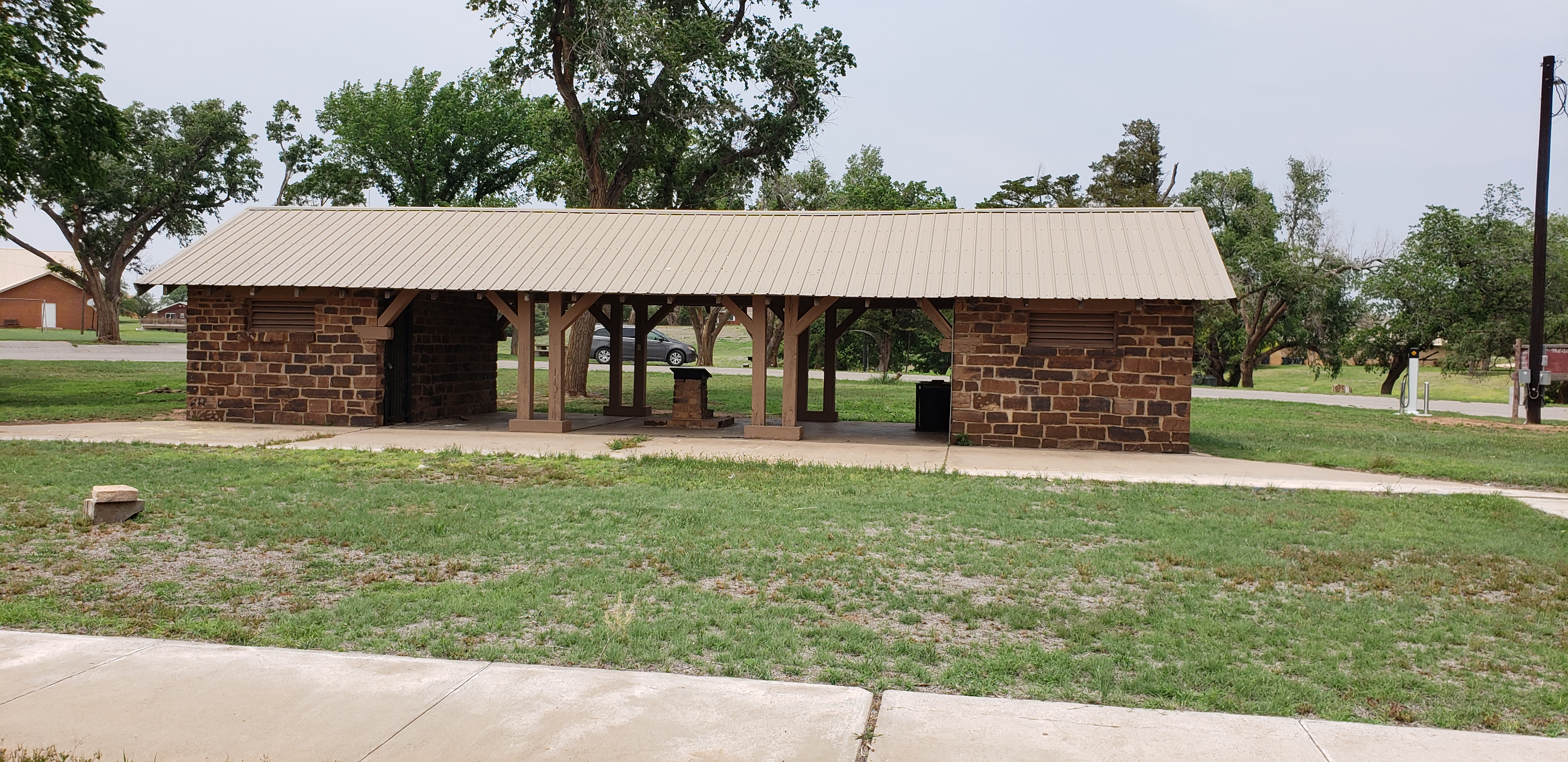

- Location within Oklahoma
- Location: US 64, Buffalo, Oklahoma
- Coordinates: 36°49′42″N 99°38′04″W
- Area: 1 acre (0.40 ha)
- Built: 1936
- MPS: WPA Public Bldgs., Recreational Facilities and Water Quality Improvements in Northwestern Oklahoma, 1935--1943 TR
- NRHP reference No.: 88001367
- Added to NRHP: September 8, 1988

The Buffalo City Park Pavilion, on US 64 in Buffalo, Oklahoma, was built in 1936. It was listed on the National Register of Historic Places listings in Harper County, Oklahoma in 1988.

It is a 52 by 20 feet (15.8 m × 6.1 m) structure made of wood and coursed native stone, including two bathrooms at each end and an open pavilion area in the middle, built as a Works Progress Administration project. It was deemed:

"...exceptionally significant in that it impacted the quality of life within the community. Prior to the 1930s, there were few picnic and other recreational facilities through northwestern Oklahoma, but a people hardened with economic difficulties and drought conditions need moments of rest and relaxation. The Buffalo facility responded to this need, providing an important new dimension to the quality of life. It is exceptionally significant too because it stands as a symbol to a work program that sought to preserve human dignity through meaningful labor. This approach was most important in northwestern Oklahoma where the work ethic was and is extremely strong and those who take "doles" were and are ridiculed. That the WPA was able to operate in this climate, employing hundreds of destitute, was because it understood that work and wages went hand in hand."
