= Cleo Springs, Oklahoma =

- Town
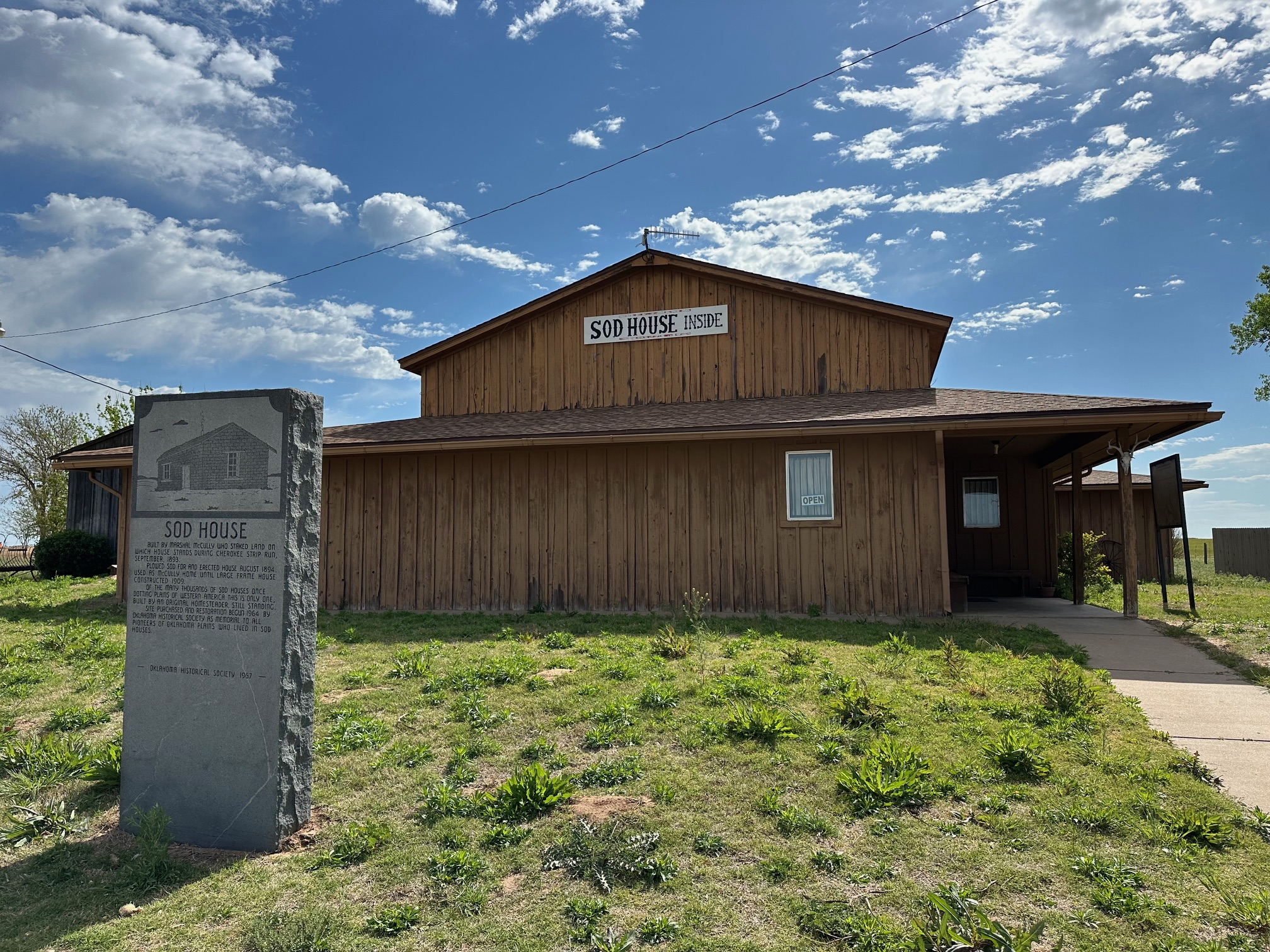
- Sod House Museum in Cleo Springs, April 2024

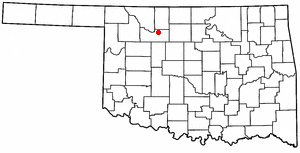
- Location in Oklahoma
- Coordinates: 36°24′17″N 98°26′24″W
- Country: United States
- State: Oklahoma
- County: Major

Area
  - Total: 0.55 sq mi (1.43 km^{2})
  - Land: 0.55 sq mi (1.43 km^{2})
  - Water: 0 sq mi (0.00 km^{2})
- Elevation: 1,276 ft (389 m)

Population (2020)
  - Total: 287
  - Density: 519.4/sq mi (200.53/km^{2})
- Time zone: UTC-6 (Central (CST))
  - Summer (DST): UTC-5 (CDT)
- ZIP Code: 73729
- Area code: 580
- FIPS code: 40-15300
- GNIS feature ID: 2413213

Cleo Springs (originally known as Cleo) is a town in Major County, Oklahoma, United States. The population was 287 at the time of the 2020 census.

== Description ==
The post office was established March 21, 1894. The Sod House Museum, which is listed on the National Register of Historic Places and also an Oklahoma Historic Site, is located north of town in Alfalfa County.

== Geography ==
Cleo Springs is in northern Major County, 10 miles (16 km) north of Fairview, the county seat, and 32 miles (51 km) west of Enid. Oklahoma State Highway 8 passes through the center of town, leading south to Fairview and north 25 miles (40 km) to Cherokee. U.S. Routes 412 and 60 pass 1 mile (1.6 km) south of town, leading east together to Enid.

According to the U.S. Census Bureau, Cleo Springs has a total area of 0.55 square miles (1.42 km^{2}), all land. Eagle Chief Creek, which passes just west of the town limits and empties into the Cimarron River nearby, was known to the Cheyenne people as Maheonekamax.

== Demographics ==
Historical population
Census	Pop.	Note	%±
1910	425		—
1920	377		−11.3%
1930	356		−5.6%
1940	386		8.4%
1950	310		−19.7%
1960	236		−23.9%
1970	344		45.8%
1980	514		49.4%
1990	359		−30.2%
2000	326		−9.2%
2010	338		3.7%
2020	287		−15.1%
U.S. Decennial Census

=== 2020 census ===
As of the 2020 census, Cleo Springs had a population of 287. The median age was 41.2 years. 28.2% of residents were under the age of 18 and 21.6% of residents were 65 years of age or older. For every 100 females there were 102.1 males, and for every 100 females age 18 and over there were 96.2 males age 18 and over.

0.0% of residents lived in urban areas, while 100.0% lived in rural areas.

There were 118 households in Cleo Springs, of which 33.9% had children under the age of 18 living in them. Of all households, 48.3% were married-couple households, 17.8% were households with a male householder and no spouse or partner present, and 28.0% were households with a female householder and no spouse or partner present. About 28.8% of all households were made up of individuals and 12.7% had someone living alone who was 65 years of age or older.

There were 147 housing units, of which 19.7% were vacant. The homeowner vacancy rate was 6.1% and the rental vacancy rate was 0.0%.

Racial composition as of the 2020 census
Race	Number	Percent
White	258	89.9%
Black or African American	1	0.3%
American Indian and Alaska Native	5	1.7%
Asian	0	0.0%
Native Hawaiian and Other Pacific Islander	0	0.0%
Some other race	7	2.4%
Two or more races	16	5.6%
Hispanic or Latino (of any race)	23	8.0%

=== 2000 census ===
As of the census of 2000, there were 326 people, 135 households, and 90 families residing in the town. The population density was 580.1 inhabitants per square mile (224.0/km^{2}). There were 153 housing units at an average density of 272.3 per square mile (105.1/km^{2}). The racial makeup of the town was 98.16% White, 1.53% African American, and 0.31% from two or more races. Hispanic or Latino people of any race were 0.31% of the population.

There were 135 households, out of which 31.1% had children under the age of 18 living with them, 59.3% were married couples living together, 5.9% had a female householder with no husband present, and 32.6% were non-families. 31.1% of all households were made up of individuals, and 16.3% had someone living alone who was 65 years of age or older. The average household size was 2.41 and the average family size was 3.01.

In the town, the population was spread out, with 23.3% under the age of 18, 11.3% from 18 to 24, 22.7% from 25 to 44, 27.3% from 45 to 64, and 15.3% who were 65 years of age or older. The median age was 40 years. For every 100 females, there were 87.4 males. For every 100 females age 18 and over, there were 88.0 males.

The median income for a household in the town was $31,250, and the median income for a family was $39,000. Males had a median income of $25,781 versus $15,893 for females. The per capita income for the town was $14,824. About 14.1% of families and 13.9% of the population were below the poverty line, including 2.8% of those under age 18 and 20.8% of those age 65 or over.

== See also ==
- List of cities and towns in Oklahoma
