= Minor Sod House =

Historic house in Kansas, United States

- U.S. National Register of Historic Places
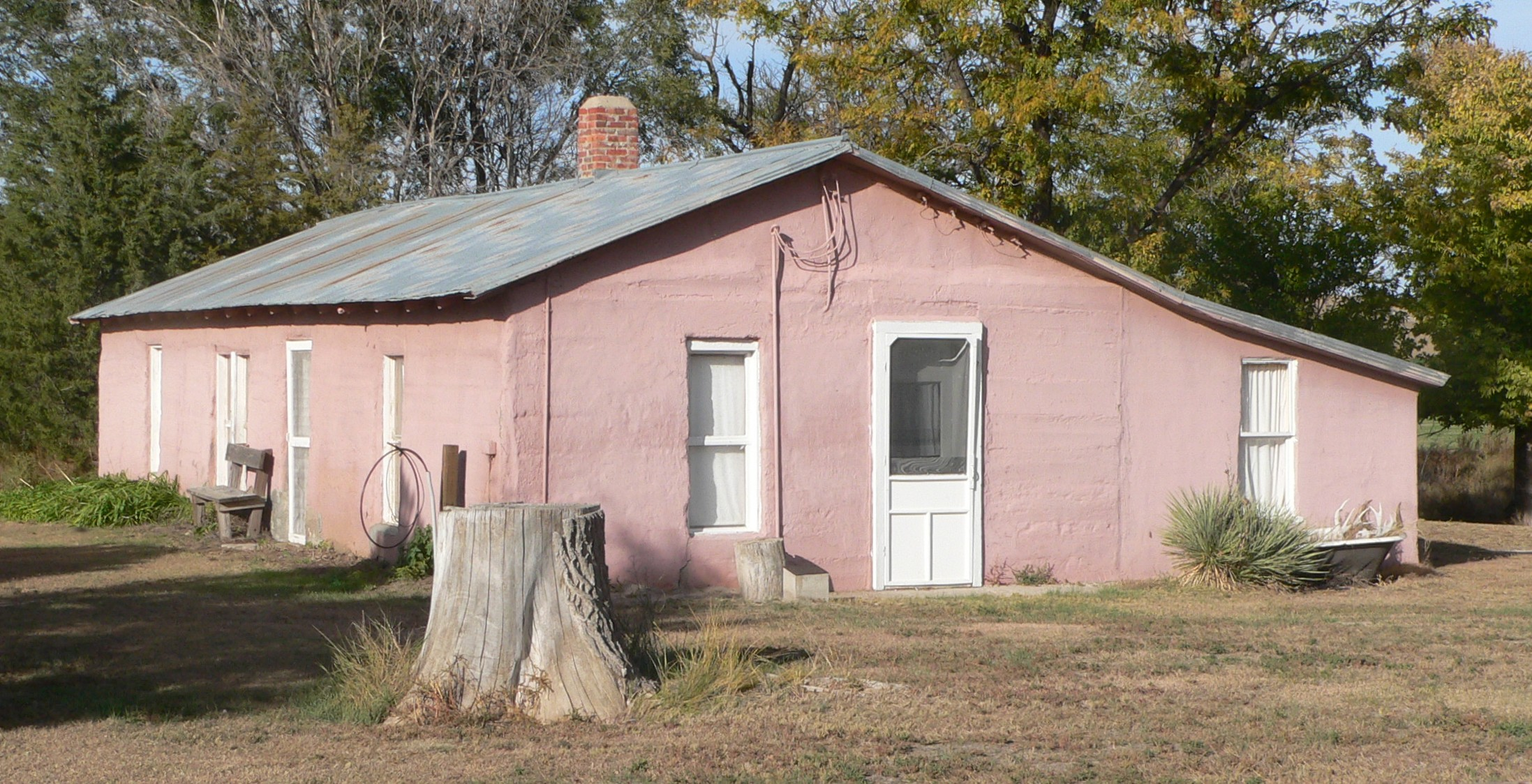

- Location within Kansas Location within the United States
- Nearest city: McDonald, Kansas
- Coordinates: 39.601416°N 101.394097°W
- Built: c. 1907
- Architectural style: Sod house
- NRHP reference No.: 04001428
- Added to NRHP: January 5, 2005

The Minor Sod House, also known as Minor Post Office, near McDonald, Kansas, is a sod house that was built c. 1907.

It is a one-story building with a gabled rectangular section about 48 by 19 feet (14.6 by 5.8 m) with 2-foot-thick (0.61 m) sod brick walls, plus a 16-by-10-foot (4.9 by 3.0 m) wood-frame lean-to section, all covered by a corrugated, galvanized metal roof. The exterior is cement and stucco in the two sections.

It was used as the first post office of Minor, Kansas, with first postmaster Tom Minor. A grocery store built by Minor not far away then served as the post office, then it returned to the soddy when the grocery store closed, until the post office itself closed in November 1920.

It was listed on the U.S. National Register of Historic Places in 2005. It served historically as a single dwelling and as a post office.
