= Buffalo Municipal Airport (Oklahoma) =

- IATA: none; ICAO: KBFK; FAA LID: BFK

Summary
- Airport type: Public
- Owner: City of Buffalo
- Serves: Buffalo, Oklahoma
- Elevation AMSL: 1,822 ft (555 m)
- Coordinates: 36°51′48″N 099°37′07″W
- Interactive map of Buffalo Municipal Airport

Runways
Direction	Length		Surface
Direction	ft	m	Surface
17/35	4,000	1,219	Asphalt

Statistics (2008)
- Aircraft operations: 200
- Source: Federal Aviation Administration

Buffalo Municipal Airport (ICAO: KBFK, FAA LID: BFK) is a city-owned, public-use airport located two miles (3 km) north of the central business district of Buffalo, a city in Harper County, Oklahoma, United States.

Although most U.S. airports use the same three-letter location identifier for the FAA and IATA, this airport is assigned BFK by the FAA but has no designation from the IATA.

== Facilities and aircraft ==
Buffalo Municipal Airport covers an area of 80 acres (32 ha) and has one runway designated 17/35 with a 4,000 x 60 ft (1,219 x 18 m) asphalt surface. For the 12-month period ending January 3, 2008, the airport had 200 general aviation aircraft operations, an average of 17 per month.

== See also ==
- List of airports in Oklahoma
