= Laverne's North Main Street District =

Historic district in Oklahoma, United States

- U.S. National Register of Historic Places
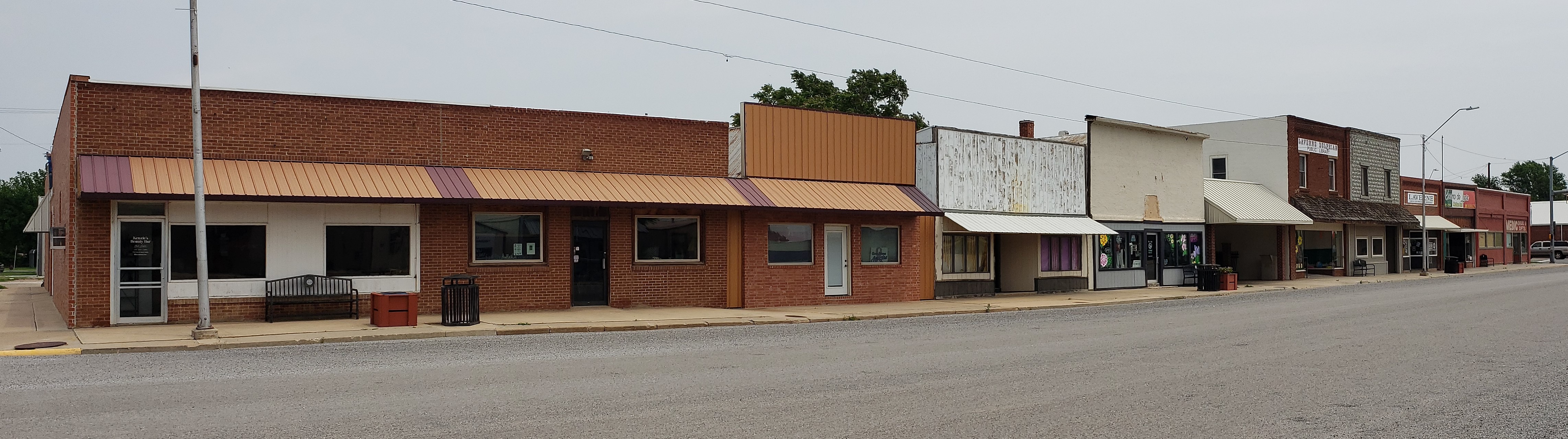

- Location within Oklahoma
- Location: Main St. and Broadway, Laverne, Oklahoma
- Coordinates: 36°42′36″N 99°53′37″W
- Area: less than one acre
- Built: 1912
- Architectural style: Plains Commercial
- MPS: Laverne's Early Commercial Development MRA
- NRHP reference No.: 84003044
- Added to NRHP: March 8, 1984

Laverne's North Main Street District, in Laverne, Oklahoma, is a historic district which was listed on the National Register of Historic Places in 1984. The listing included 10 contributing buildings.

It runs along the north side of Main street, running west from Broadway, and includes Plains Commercial architecture.
