= Fox Hotel =

- U.S. National Register of Historic Places
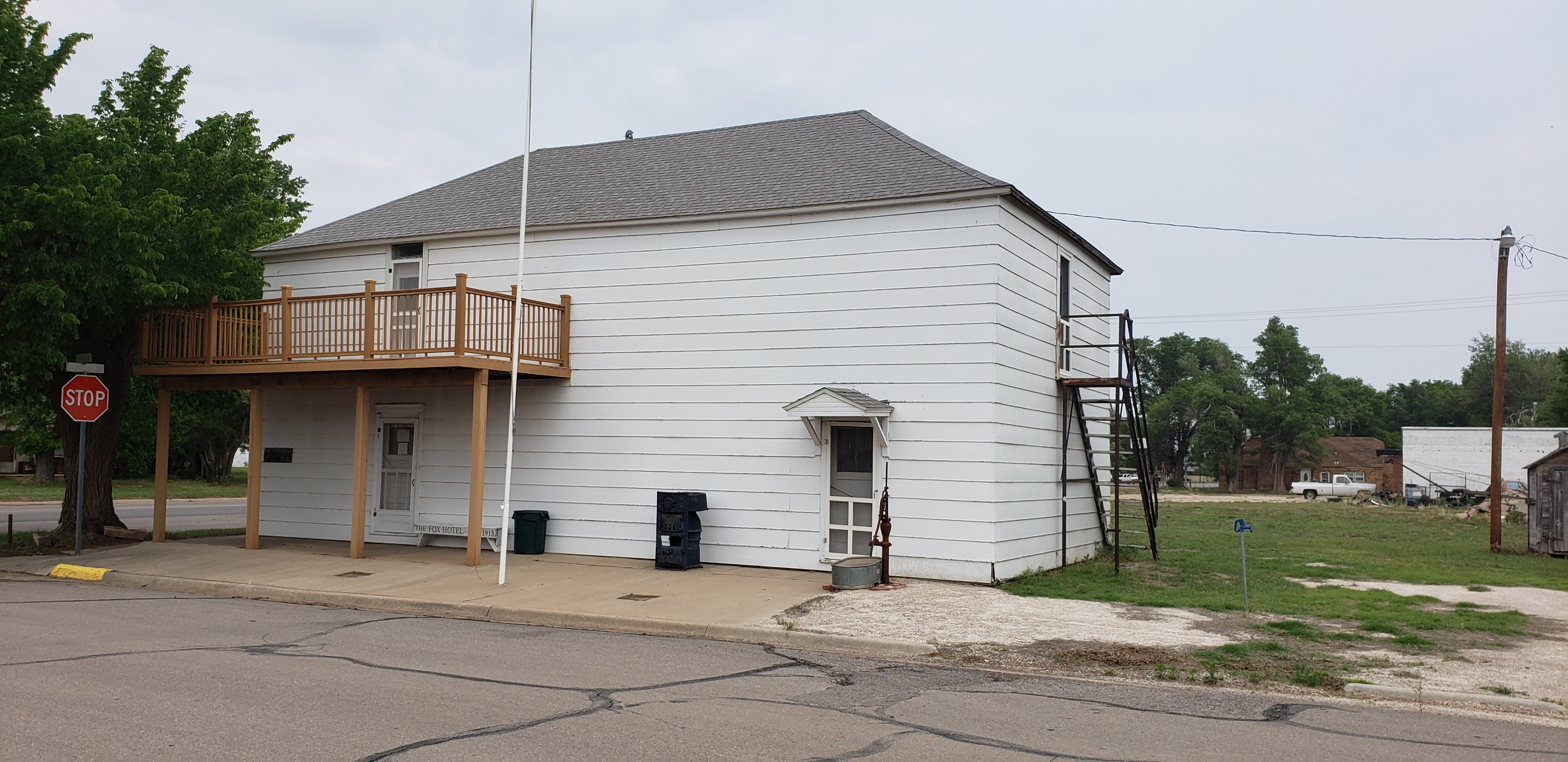

- Location within Oklahoma
- Location: Broadway and NE 1st St., Laverne, Oklahoma
- Coordinates: 36°42′40″N 99°53′34″W
- Area: less than one acre
- Built: 1912
- NRHP reference No.: 78002236
- Added to NRHP: January 30, 1978

The Fox Hotel, at Broadway and NE 1st St. in Laverne, Oklahoma, is a historic hotel built in 1912. It was listed on the National Register of Historic Places in 1978.

Located at an entrance to the Oklahoma panhandle, it was built in 1912 when the railroad arrived.
