= Sod House (Cleo Springs, Oklahoma) =

Historic house in Oklahoma, United States

- U.S. National Register of Historic Places
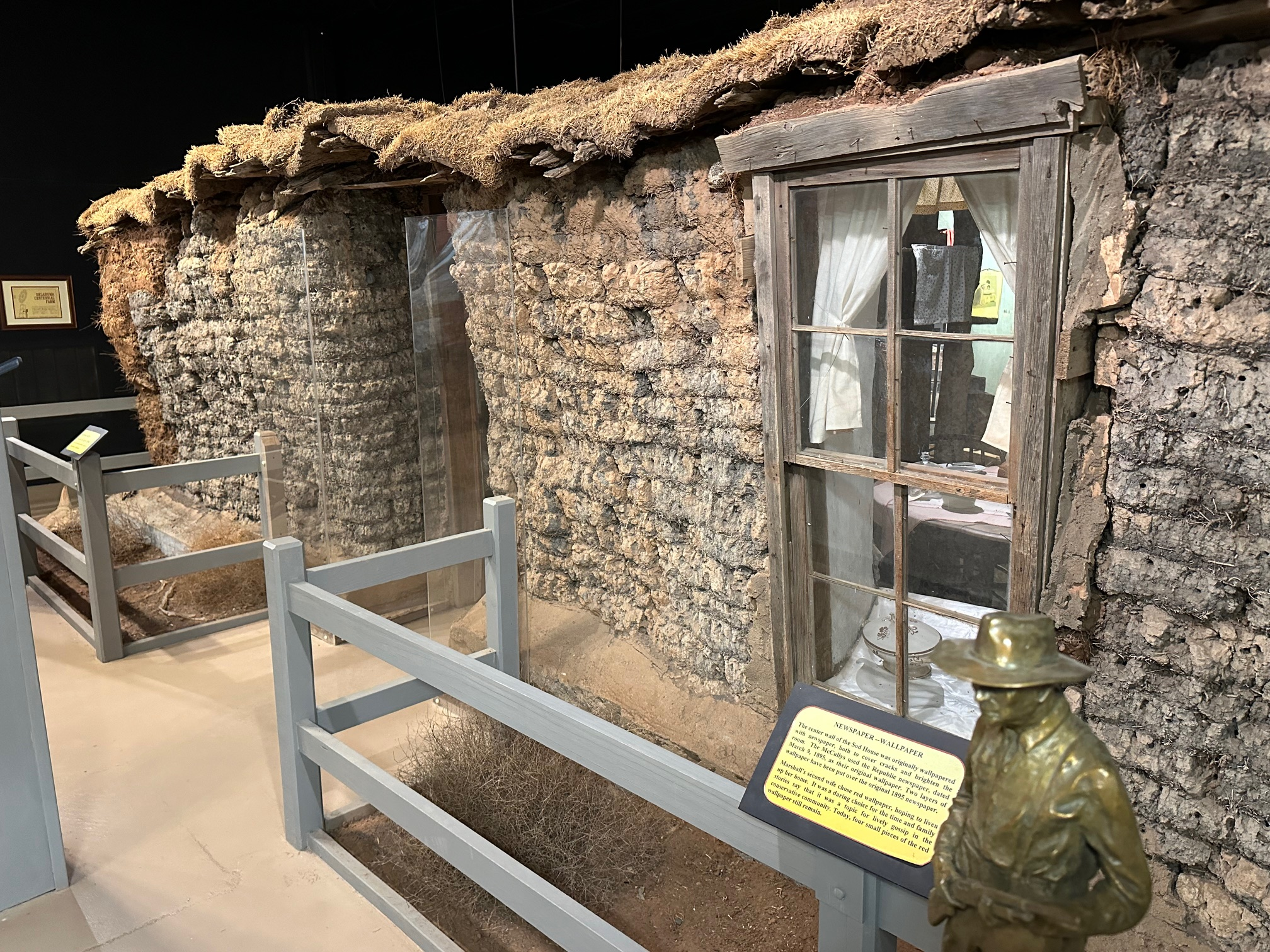
- The Sod House, April 2024

- Location within Oklahoma Location within the United States
- Nearest city: Cleo Springs, Oklahoma
- Coordinates: 36°28′17″N 98°25′23″W
- Built: 1894
- Architect: McCully, Marshall
- NRHP reference No.: 70000526
- Added to NRHP: September 29, 1970

The Sod House, which is also known as Marshall McCully Sod House, is a sod house built in 1894. It is located in Alfalfa County, Oklahoma approximately four miles north of Cleo Springs, Oklahoma.

== History ==
The Sod House was built by Marshal McCully in 1894. Sod houses were constructed by settlers of southern and western Oklahoma Territory because there was not enough timber to build wooden houses. The sod house near Cleo Springs is the only remaining sod house in Oklahoma that was built by settlers. It was listed on the National Register of Historic Places in 1970. The Sod House Museum (under the Oklahoma Historical Society) maintains the structure.

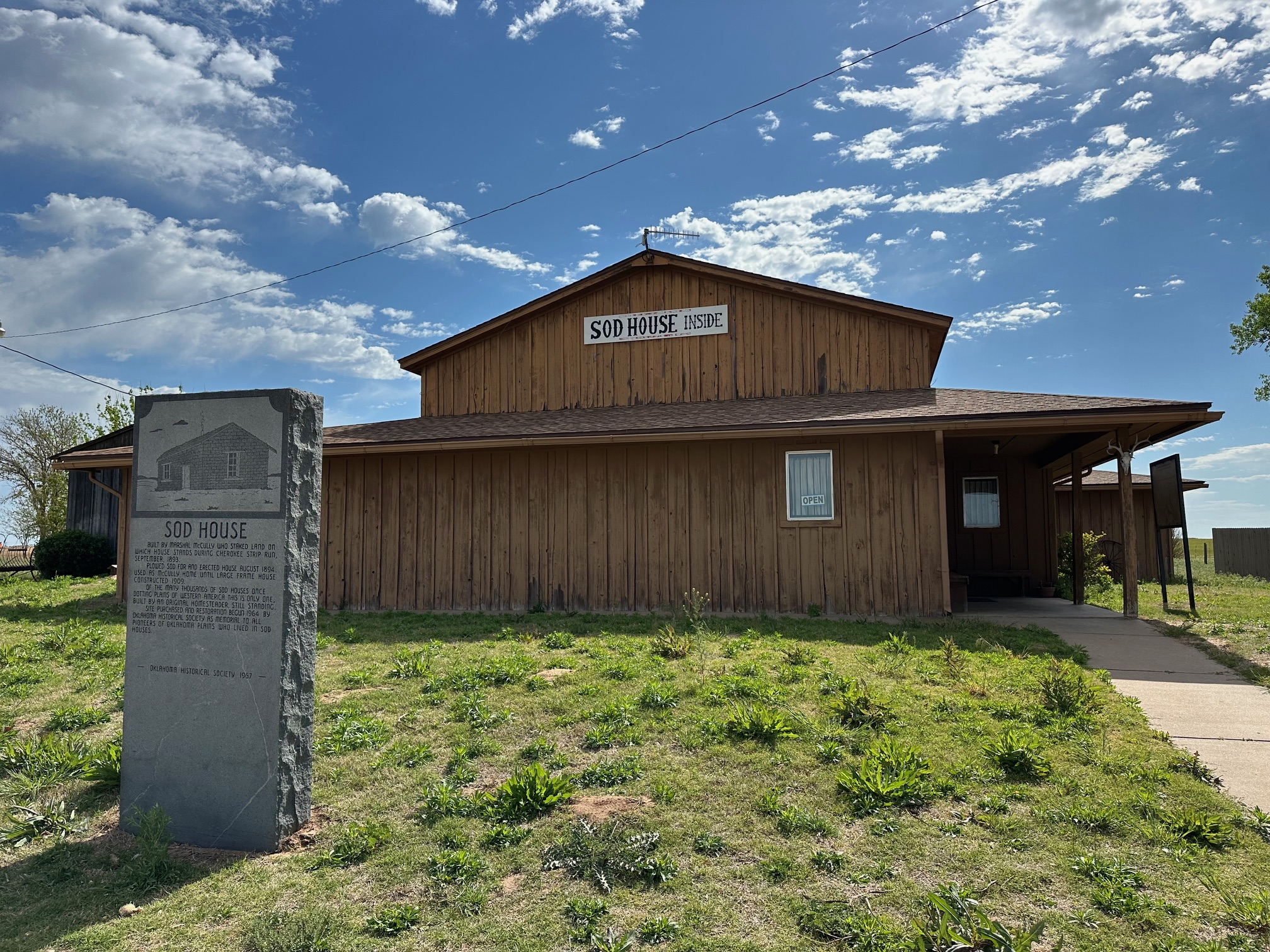
Museum building around the Sod House, April 2024

== See also ==
- List of sod houses
