= I.O.O.F. Building of Buffalo =

- U.S. National Register of Historic Places
- Location within Oklahoma Location within the United States
- Location: 110 W. Turner St., Buffalo, Oklahoma
- Coordinates: 36°50′7″N 99°37′53″W
- Area: less than one acre
- Built: 1917
- Architectural style: Plains Commercial Style
- NRHP reference No.: 83002087
- Added to NRHP: July 14, 1983

The I.O.O.F. Building of Buffalo, in Buffalo, Oklahoma, is an International Order of Odd Fellows building that was built in 1917 in what is now known as Plains Commercial Style architecture. Also known as Harper County Journal Office, the building was listed on the National Register of Historic Places in 1983. It served historically as a meeting hall and as a business.

The building is 100 feet (30 m) by 25 feet (7.6 m). Its nomination to the National Register describes its importance as:

The I.O.O.F. Building and now the offices of the Harper County Journal in Buffalo is excellently preserved and unaltered example of the austere Plains Commercial style architecture typical of northwest Oklahoma after statehood. In addition, the building is significant as a social center with the I.O.O.F. lodge's meeting hall and as the offices for the oldest newspaper in the county, an important means of disseminating information for the early citizens of the county.
