= Battelle for Kids =

Non-profitable organizations based in the United States

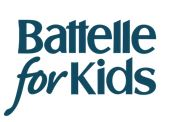
- Type: Not-for-profit organization
- Industry: Education
- Founded: 2001
- Headquarters: Columbus, Ohio
- Key people: Karen K. Garza, Ph.D., President & CEO

Battelle for Kids (BFK) is a national not-for-profit. The organization is headquartered in Columbus, Ohio.

== About ==
Supported by an initial grant from Battelle Memorial Institute, Battelle for Kids was established in 2001 to improve student achievement in Ohio under the leadership of former executive director Jim Mahoney. In 2005, Battelle for Kids became an independent, national not-for-profit organization focused on developing services to support teachers, leaders, and school systems. In December 2016, Dr. Karen Garza became the organization's president and CEO.

== Innovation ==
Part of BFK's early work was the creation of SOAR, a group of 42 Ohio school districts exploring innovative practices for their schools. In October 2017, BFK merged with EdLeader21, a professional learning community of education leaders from nearly 200 school systems nationwide focused on helping students master critical thinking, communication, collaboration, and creativity.

== 2021 Data breach ==
On December 1, 2021, Battelle for Kids was affected by a ransomware attack which accessed data stored about Chicago Public Schools students. Clients were informed nearly 7 months later. On May 20, 2022, CPS announced that Battelle for Kids suffered a ransomware attack and did not act on the information per their agreement with CPS. CPS continues to use BFK storage services.
