= Buffalo, Oklahoma =

- Town
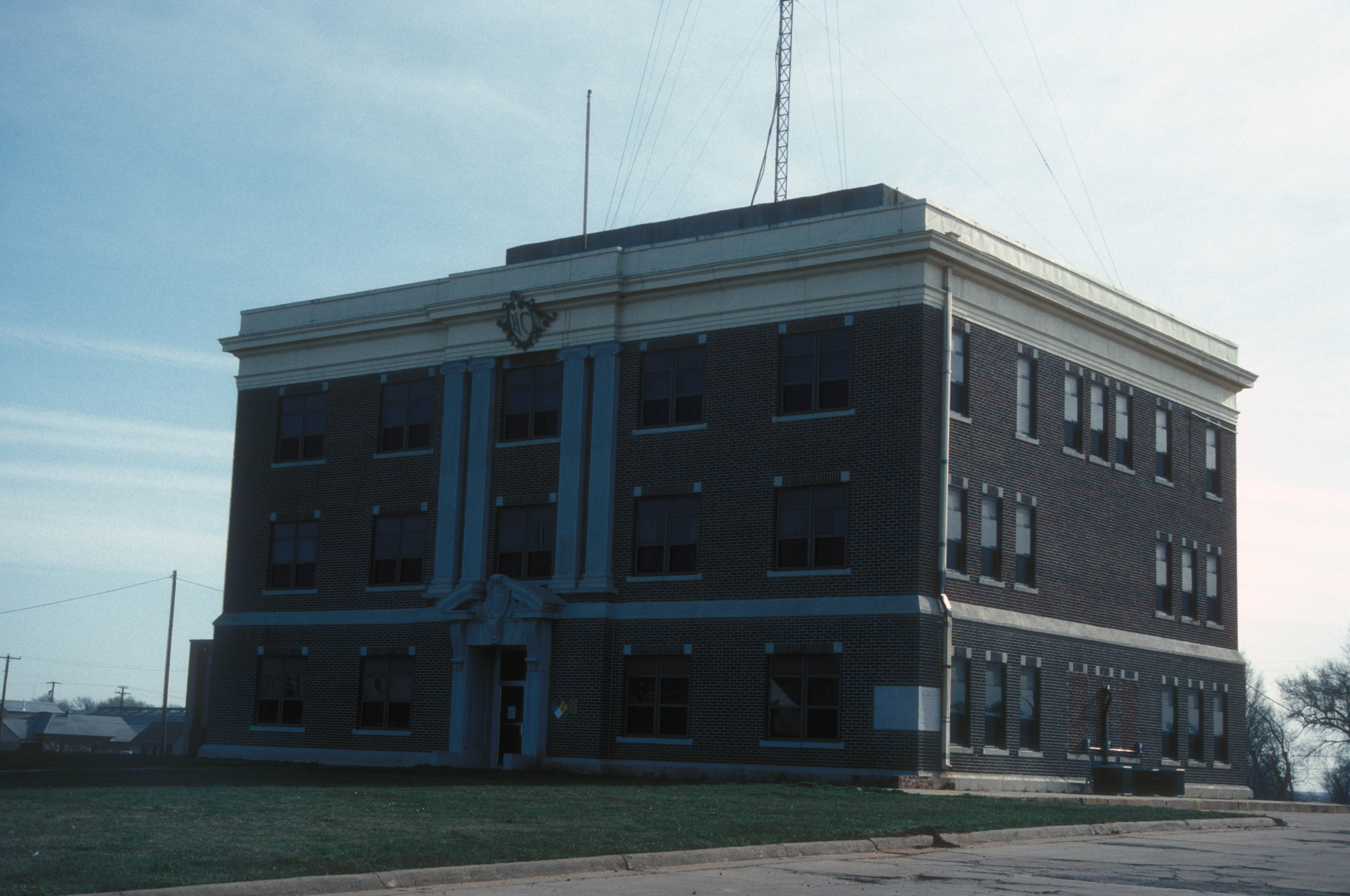
- Harper County Courthouse (2007)

- Location in Harper County and the state of Oklahoma.
- Coordinates: 36°50′07″N 99°37′40″W
- Country: United States
- State: Oklahoma
- County: Harper

Government
  - Mayor: Jarie Coggins

Area
  - Total: 1.11 sq mi (2.88 km^{2})
  - Land: 1.11 sq mi (2.88 km^{2})
  - Water: 0 sq mi (0.00 km^{2})
- Elevation: 1,801 ft (549 m)

Population (2020)
  - Total: 1,039
  - Density: 933.4/sq mi (360.37/km^{2})
- Time zone: UTC-6 (CST)
  - Summer (DST): UTC-5 (CDT)
- ZIP code: 73834
- Area code: 580
- FIPS code: 40-09850
- GNIS ID: 2411740
- Website: buffalooklahoma.com

Buffalo is a town in and the county seat of Harper County, Oklahoma, United States. As of the 2020 census, the town's population was 1,039. It was named after the Buffalo Creek valley, in which it is located.

== History ==
In 1907, the town was "staked out" and a post office was established with the name Buffalo, which was derived from nearby Buffalo Creek. In 1908, a county seat election gave the seat to Buffalo and the town was incorporated in the same year. Buffalo's founders issued instructions for all buildings to be built of stone, thereby many of those structures survived the test of time.

When citizens of Harper County decided to link their county seat with the railroads, they created the Buffalo and Northwestern Railroad, which arrived in Buffalo in May 1920. However, that trackage was abandoned in 1982, and Buffalo currently has no rail service.

== Geography ==
According to the United States Census Bureau, Buffalo has a total area of 0.8 square miles (2.1 km^{2}), all land. The city lies in the northwestern corner of Oklahoma at the Panhandle's eastern entrance, along U.S. routes 64/183, 12 miles (19 km) south of the Kansas state line. It is 30 miles (48 km) northeast of the Texas state line and 174 miles (280 km) northwest of Oklahoma City.

Doby Springs Park and Campgrounds, located about 11 miles west, includes a fishing lake, camping sites, a playground, and nature trails along rolling canyons. The complex also has a PGA-rated 9-hole golf course.

=== Climate ===
Buffalo has a typical Oklahoma humid subtropical climate (Köppen Cfa), characterized by hot to sweltering summers and chilly though extremely variable winters. Rainfall is moderate, with a minimum of less than 0.7 inches or 18 millimeters in January and a maximum of approximately 4 inches or 100 millimeters in May. While not the snowiest location in Oklahoma ranked by highest annual average snowfall, Buffalo has the distinction of holding the State snowfall record over 24 hours, when 23 inches or 0.58 meters fell on February 21, 1971.

Climate data for Buffalo, Oklahoma (1981–2010 normals, extremes 1907–2011)
Month	Jan	Feb	Mar	Apr	May	Jun	Jul	Aug	Sep	Oct	Nov	Dec	Year
Record high °F (°C)	87 (31)	92 (33)	99 (37)	105 (41)	108 (42)	115 (46)	115 (46)	115 (46)	112 (44)	102 (39)	93 (34)	89 (32)	115 (46)
Mean maximum °F (°C)	73.5 (23.1)	78.6 (25.9)	86.2 (30.1)	92.2 (33.4)	98.0 (36.7)	103.1 (39.5)	107.4 (41.9)	107.1 (41.7)	101.6 (38.7)	93.2 (34.0)	82.1 (27.8)	71.4 (21.9)	109.7 (43.2)
Mean daily maximum °F (°C)	47.3 (8.5)	52.3 (11.3)	60.8 (16.0)	70.1 (21.2)	79.0 (26.1)	88.4 (31.3)	94.3 (34.6)	93.6 (34.2)	84.8 (29.3)	72.0 (22.2)	58.9 (14.9)	47.0 (8.3)	70.7 (21.5)
Daily mean °F (°C)	34.1 (1.2)	38.4 (3.6)	46.5 (8.1)	56.0 (13.3)	66.0 (18.9)	76.0 (24.4)	81.3 (27.4)	80.4 (26.9)	71.4 (21.9)	58.5 (14.7)	45.4 (7.4)	34.5 (1.4)	57.4 (14.1)
Mean daily minimum °F (°C)	20.8 (−6.2)	24.5 (−4.2)	32.2 (0.1)	41.9 (5.5)	53.0 (11.7)	63.6 (17.6)	68.2 (20.1)	67.2 (19.6)	58.1 (14.5)	45.0 (7.2)	31.9 (−0.1)	22.0 (−5.6)	44.0 (6.7)
Mean minimum °F (°C)	5.3 (−14.8)	8.1 (−13.3)	16.4 (−8.7)	26.5 (−3.1)	38.6 (3.7)	51.2 (10.7)	57.9 (14.4)	56.5 (13.6)	40.6 (4.8)	27.8 (−2.3)	16.1 (−8.8)	6.9 (−13.9)	−0.8 (−18.2)
Record low °F (°C)	−17 (−27)	−13 (−25)	−8 (−22)	15 (−9)	25 (−4)	35 (2)	45 (7)	43 (6)	26 (−3)	12 (−11)	0 (−18)	−10 (−23)	−17 (−27)
Average precipitation inches (mm)	0.66 (17)	1.00 (25)	1.81 (46)	2.21 (56)	3.63 (92)	4.08 (104)	2.06 (52)	2.84 (72)	2.09 (53)	2.14 (54)	1.22 (31)	0.95 (24)	24.69 (627)
Average snowfall inches (cm)	2.1 (5.3)	3.7 (9.4)	2.0 (5.1)	0.2 (0.51)	0.0 (0.0)	0.0 (0.0)	0.0 (0.0)	0.0 (0.0)	0.0 (0.0)	0.0 (0.0)	1.8 (4.6)	3.5 (8.9)	13.3 (34)
Average precipitation days (≥ 0.01 in)	2.2	3.5	5.4	5.6	7.2	7.6	5.3	6.5	5.4	5.3	3.2	3.1	60.3
Average snowy days (≥ 0.1 in)	1.0	1.4	0.6	0.1	0.0	0.0	0.0	0.0	0.0	0.0	0.4	1.3	4.8
Source: NOAA

== Demographics ==
Historical population
Census	Pop.	Note	%±
1910	282		—
1920	479		69.9%
1930	990		106.7%
1940	1,209		22.1%
1950	1,544		27.7%
1960	1,618		4.8%
1970	1,579		−2.4%
1980	1,381		−12.5%
1990	1,512		9.5%
2000	1,200		−20.6%
2010	1,299		8.3%
2020	1,039		−20.0%
U.S. Decennial Census

=== 2020 census ===
As of the 2020 census, Buffalo had a population of 1,039. The median age was 44.2 years. 23.9% of residents were under the age of 18 and 23.3% of residents were 65 years of age or older. For every 100 females there were 93.1 males, and for every 100 females age 18 and over there were 90.6 males age 18 and over.

0.0% of residents lived in urban areas, while 100.0% lived in rural areas.

There were 429 households in Buffalo, of which 32.6% had children under the age of 18 living in them. Of all households, 50.1% were married-couple households, 17.9% were households with a male householder and no spouse or partner present, and 27.3% were households with a female householder and no spouse or partner present. About 31.5% of all households were made up of individuals and 17.3% had someone living alone who was 65 years of age or older.

There were 557 housing units, of which 23.0% were vacant. The homeowner vacancy rate was 2.2% and the rental vacancy rate was 29.7%.

Racial composition as of the 2020 census
Race	Number	Percent
White	764	73.5%
Black or African American	0	0.0%
American Indian and Alaska Native	9	0.9%
Asian	0	0.0%
Native Hawaiian and Other Pacific Islander	0	0.0%
Some other race	153	14.7%
Two or more races	113	10.9%
Hispanic or Latino (of any race)	258	24.8%

=== 2000 census ===
As of the census of 2000, there were 1,200 people, 495 households, and 336 families residing in the town. The population density was 1,502.4 inhabitants per square mile (580.1/km^{2}). There were 599 housing units at an average density of 750.0 per square mile (289.6/km^{2}). The racial makeup of the town was 92.92% White, 0.08% African American, 1.17% Native American, 4.67% from other races, and 1.17% from two or more races. Hispanic or Latino of any race were 10.33% of the population.

There were 495 households, out of which 28.9% had children under the age of 18 living with them, 56.0% were married couples living together, 8.7% had a female householder with no husband present, and 32.1% were non-families. 28.7% of all households were made up of individuals, and 15.8% had someone living alone who was 65 years of age or older. The average household size was 2.34 and the average family size was 2.87.

In the town, the population was spread out, with 22.8% under the age of 18, 7.5% from 18 to 24, 22.8% from 25 to 44, 24.2% from 45 to 64, and 22.8% who were 65 years of age or older. The median age was 43 years. For every 100 females, there were 91.4 males. For every 100 females age 18 and over, there were 92.5 males.

The median income for a household in the town was $30,433, and the median income for a family was $38,333. Males had a median income of $25,625 versus $20,515 for females. The per capita income for the town was $15,328. About 8.2% of families and 11.7% of the population were below the poverty line, including 18.1% of those under age 18 and 5.4% of those age 65 or over.

== Education ==
Buffalo School District oversees primary and secondary education.

== Media ==
The Buffalo Weekly News was established in 2014 and is published every Wednesday.

The Harper County Journal, consolidated from the Buffalo Republican and the Harper County Democrat, was published in Buffalo from 1903 to 2014, when it merged with the Laverne Leader Tribune to become the Harper County Leader, still published weekly in Laverne, Oklahoma.

Other early newspapers included the Buffalo News, the Buffalo Bugle, and the Post.

== Transportation ==
U.S. Route 64 and U.S. Route 183 run concurrently through town.

Buffalo Municipal Airport is located about 2 miles north.

== Historic sites ==
The following in the Buffalo area are NRHP-listed:

- Buffalo City Park Pavilion
- Farmers’ Co-op Elevator
- Feuquay Elevator
- Harper County Courthouse
- I.O.O.F. Building of Buffalo
- Monhollow Artificial Stone House
- Page Soddy
