= Harper County Courthouse (Oklahoma) =

- U.S. National Register of Historic Places
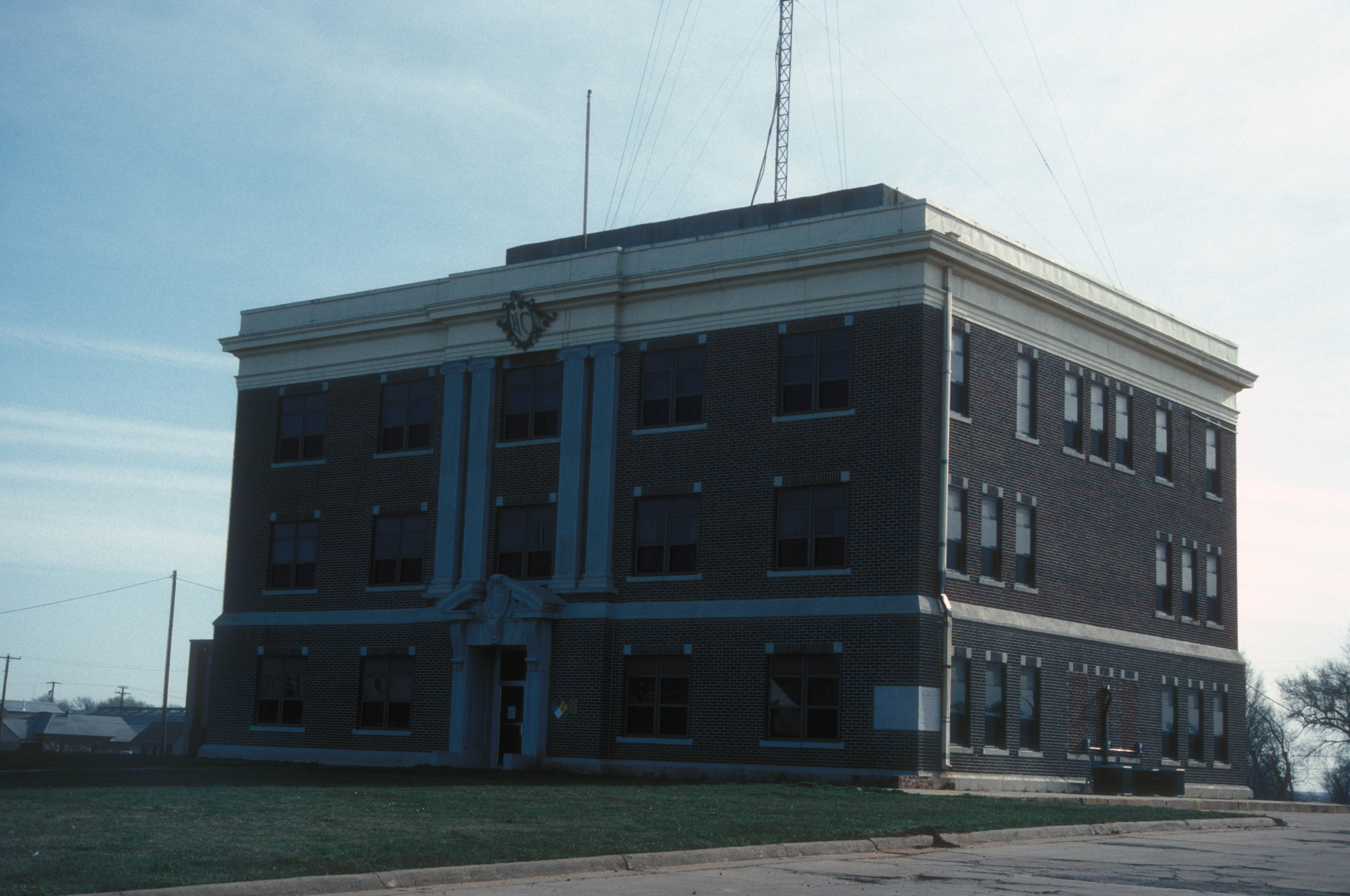

- Location within Oklahoma Location within the United States
- Location: Elm, Maple, 1st, and 2nd Sts. SE, Buffalo, Oklahoma
- Coordinates: 36°49′59″N 99°37′41″W
- Area: 1 acre (0.40 ha)
- Built: 1927
- Architect: Maurice Jayne
- Architectural style: Classical Revival, Plains Commercial
- MPS: County Courthouses of Oklahoma TR
- NRHP reference No.: 84003041
- Added to NRHP: August 23, 1984

The Harper County Courthouse in Buffalo, Oklahoma, built in 1927, was Harper County's first courthouse building. It was listed on the National Register of Historic Places in 1984.

It is a red brick three-story Plains Commercial style structure. It is 75 by 50 feet (23 m × 15 m) in plan. It has paired Ionic pilasters bracketing the central windows of its second and third floors, above the front entrance. The entrance is topped by a broken pediment with a carved stone escutcheon.
