= Laverne, Oklahoma =

- Town

- Location in Harper County and the state of Oklahoma.
- Coordinates: 36°42′19″N 99°53′48″W
- Country: United States
- State: Oklahoma
- County: Harper

Area
  - Total: 0.75 sq mi (1.94 km^{2})
  - Land: 0.75 sq mi (1.94 km^{2})
  - Water: 0 sq mi (0.00 km^{2})
- Elevation: 2,116 ft (645 m)

Population (2020)
  - Total: 1,223
  - Density: 1,633.6/sq mi (630.72/km^{2})
- Time zone: UTC-6 (Central (CST))
  - Summer (DST): UTC-5 (CDT)
- ZIP code: 73848
- Area code: 580
- FIPS code: 40-41700
- GNIS feature ID: 2412880
- Website: townoflaverne.org

Laverne is a town in Harper County, Oklahoma, United States. The population was 1,223 at the 2020 census.

== History ==
Laverne's origin is traced to John Mollman's homestead, which he established in 1903. The site was then in Woodward County, Oklahoma Territory. A post office was established in 1896 with the name Laverne and continued operating until 1908. After 1908, mail addressed to Laverne was redirected to another post office named Speedmore (now defunct).

Mollman sold part of his acreage to a townsite promoter in 1911. The promoter platted the area and began selling lots. The Wichita Falls and Northwestern Railway (WF&NW), a Missouri, Kansas and Texas Railway (Katy) subsidiary, reached the new settlement in Spring, 1912.

The community was named Laverne after the old post office was moved to the new site in May 1912. (A post office remains in Laverne as of late 2026.) According to the Encyclopedia of Oklahoma History and Culture, by June 1912, Laverne had 44 businesses, including the Laverne State Bank, the Fox Hotel (NR 78002236) and the Clover Hotel (NR 84003034). Both hotels were built in 1912.

== Geography ==
It is at the intersection of U.S. Highway 283 and State Highway 149, 23 miles (37 km) southwest of Buffalo and 179 miles (288 km) northwest of Oklahoma City.

According to the United States Census Bureau, the town has a total area of 0.7 square miles (1.8 km^{2}), all land.

Lake Evans Chambers is to the west.

== Demographics ==
Historical population
Census	Pop.	Note	%±
1920	476		—
1930	903		89.7%
1940	816		−9.6%
1950	1,269		55.5%
1960	1,937		52.6%
1970	1,337		−31.0%
1980	1,563		16.9%
1990	1,269		−18.8%
2000	1,097		−13.6%
2010	1,344		22.5%
2020	1,223		−9.0%
U.S. Decennial Census

=== 2020 census ===
As of the 2020 census, Laverne had a population of 1,223. The median age was 38.0 years. 27.9% of residents were under the age of 18 and 18.3% of residents were 65 years of age or older. For every 100 females there were 101.8 males, and for every 100 females age 18 and over there were 102.3 males age 18 and over.

0.0% of residents lived in urban areas, while 100.0% lived in rural areas.

There were 502 households in Laverne, of which 31.9% had children under the age of 18 living in them. Of all households, 50.8% were married-couple households, 21.1% were households with a male householder and no spouse or partner present, and 25.5% were households with a female householder and no spouse or partner present. About 34.0% of all households were made up of individuals and 16.0% had someone living alone who was 65 years of age or older.

There were 631 housing units, of which 20.4% were vacant. The homeowner vacancy rate was 2.5% and the rental vacancy rate was 21.8%.

Racial composition as of the 2020 census
Race	Number	Percent
White	831	67.9%
Black or African American	4	0.3%
American Indian and Alaska Native	24	2.0%
Asian	1	0.1%
Native Hawaiian and Other Pacific Islander	0	0.0%
Some other race	288	23.5%
Two or more races	75	6.1%
Hispanic or Latino (of any race)	403	33.0%

=== 2000 census ===
As of the census of 2000, there were 1,097 people, 503 households, and 303 families residing in the town. The population density was 1,473.2 inhabitants per square mile (568.8/km^{2}). There were 637 housing units at an average density of 855.5 per square mile (330.3/km^{2}). The racial makeup of the town was 97.08% White, 0.73% Native American, 0.09% Asian, 1.37% from other races, and 0.73% from two or more races. Hispanic or Latino of any race were 3.65% of the population.

There were 503 households, out of which 26.4% had children under the age of 18 living with them, 50.9% were married couples living together, 7.0% had a female householder with no husband present, and 39.6% were non-families. 38.0% of all households were made up of individuals, and 21.7% had someone living alone who was 65 years of age or older. The average household size was 2.18 and the average family size was 2.89.

In the town, the population was spread out, with 23.6% under the age of 18, 7.2% from 18 to 24, 24.4% from 25 to 44, 21.1% from 45 to 64, and 23.6% who were 65 years of age or older. The median age was 41 years. For every 100 females, there were 88.5 males. For every 100 females age 18 and over, there were 83.8 males.

The median income for a household in the town was $32,222, and the median income for a family was $38,984. Males had a median income of $31,667 versus $20,000 for females. The per capita income for the town was $20,424. About 8.9% of families and 13.0% of the population were below the poverty line, including 26.9% of those under age 18 and 3.5% of those age 65 or over.

== Economy ==
The Laverne economy has been supported largely on agriculture, with broomcorn, wheat and cattle as the leading products until 1920. Hay replaced broomcorn, whose market has largely disappeared. Oil and gas production became important during the 1920s. Laverne acquired the nickname, "the Oil Capital of Northwest Oklahoma" during a short-lived boom in production during the 1950s. The Katy stopped rail service in 1972 and abandoned its line to Laverne.

The local newspaper, Laverne Leader Tribune, is published weekly.

== Education ==
The Laverne public school system educates students from Harper and Ellis counties, as well as those from Beaver County.

== Historic sites ==
The following in the Laverne area are NRHP-listed:

- Beagley-Stinson Archeological Site
- Clover Hotel
- Fox Hotel
- Laverne's North Main Street District
- M. K. and T. Depot in Laverne
- Sharp Lumberyard

== Notable people ==
- Jane Jayroe, Miss America 1967, former news anchor at KOCO (Oklahoma City) and KXAS (Dallas), moved to Laverne with her family from Sentinel during her childhood. A major street in Laverne was renamed for her.
- Jimmy Webb, songwriter and musician, moved to Laverne and attended Laverne Public Schools for his junior year. After Laverne, he moved to California to start his career. According to numerous articles about Jimmy Webb he claims Laverne as his hometown in Oklahoma.
