= Buffalo-Lancaster Regional Airport =

- IATA: none; ICAO: KBQR; FAA LID: BQR

Summary
- Airport type: Public
- Owner: Lancaster Airport Inc.
- Serves: Lancaster, New York
- Elevation AMSL: 752 ft (229 m)
- Coordinates: 42°55′20″N 078°36′44″W
- Website: BuffaloLancaster.com

Map
- Location of airport in New York BQR (the United States)

Runways
Direction	Length		Surface
Direction	ft	m	Surface
9/27	3,199	975	asphalt

Statistics (2026)
- Based aircraft: 83
- Source: Federal Aviation Administration

Buffalo-Lancaster Regional Airport (ICAO: KBQR, FAA LID: BQR, formerly D77) is a privately owned, public use airport in Erie County, New York, United States. It is located three nautical miles (6 km) northeast of the central business district of Lancaster, a village in the Town of Lancaster, east of Buffalo.

Although many U.S. airports use the same three-letter location identifier for the FAA and IATA, this airport is assigned BQR by the FAA but has no designation from the IATA.

The runway at Buffalo-Lancaster Airport was planned to be extended from 3,199 to 5,500 ft (975 to 1,676 m), to be completed in 2010, which would have allowed it to accommodate larger airplanes and private jets. The airport is also an emergency landing site for Buffalo Niagara International Airport (handling smaller aircraft).

== Facilities and aircraft ==
Buffalo-Lancaster Regional Airport covers an area of 100 acres (40 ha) at an elevation of 752 feet (229 m) above mean sea level. It has one asphalt paved runway designated 9/27 which measures 3,199 by 75 feet (975 by 23 m).

The airport is the primary-reliever of the Buffalo Niagara International Airport.

For the 12-month period ending July 17, 2006, the airport had 30,000 general aviation aircraft operations, an average of 82 per day. At that time there were 37 aircraft based at this airport: 95% single-engine and 5% multi-engine.

== Services ==
Buffalo Lancaster Regional Airport provides several services for general aviation. Pilots have 24-hour access to self-serve 100LL fuel, along with on-site aircraft maintenance facilities capable of performing major airframe and powerplant repairs.

For visiting aircraft, the airport offers transient storage options, including both indoor hangar space and outdoor tiedowns, however, pilots are encouraged to call well in advance to ensure availability.

== See also ==
- List of airports in New York
