= Harper County, Oklahoma =

County in Oklahoma, United States

- County
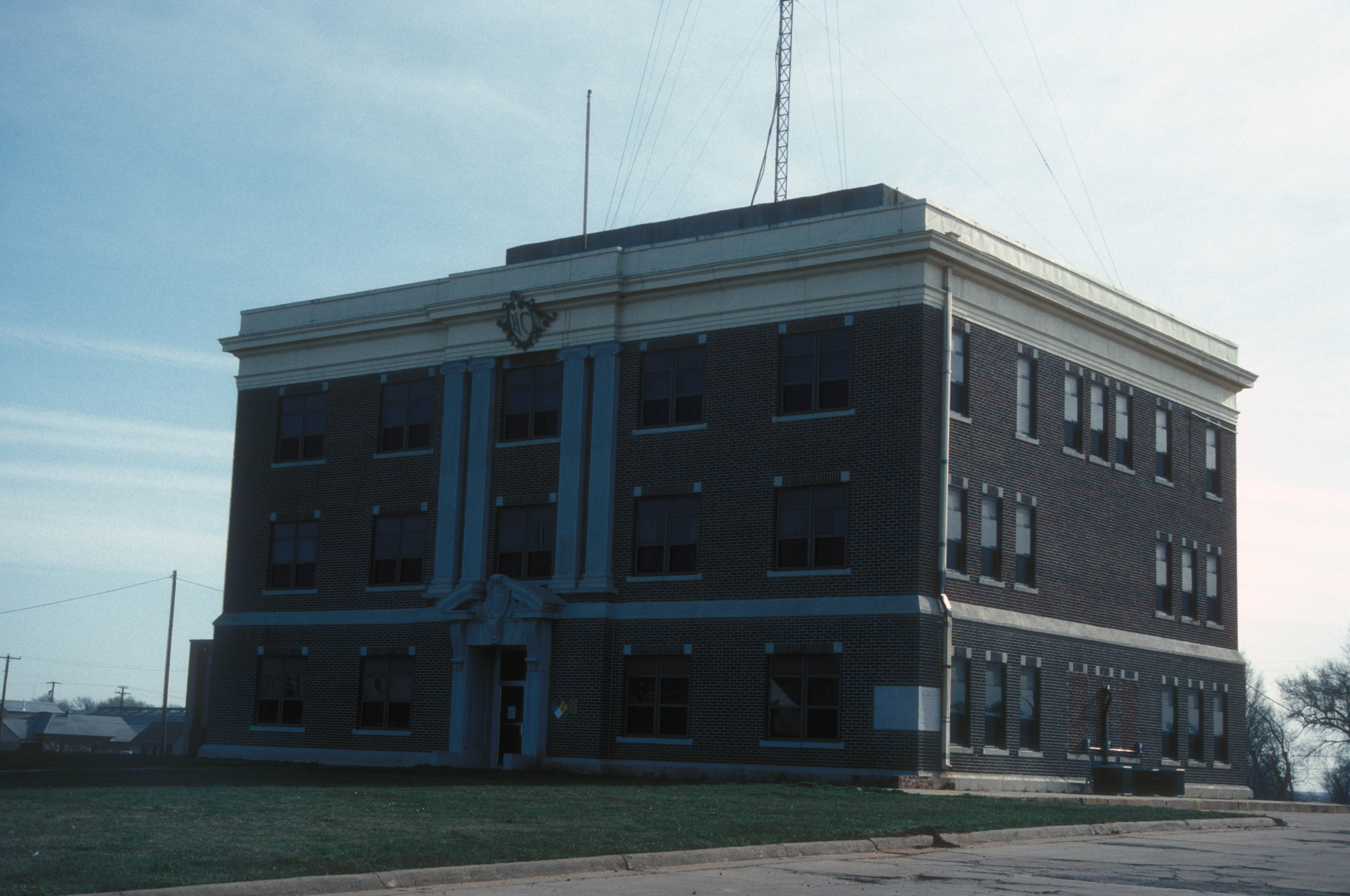
- Harper County Courthouse in Buffalo (2007)

- Location within the U.S. state of Oklahoma
- Coordinates: 36°47′N 99°39′W
- Country: United States
- State: Oklahoma
- Founded: 1907
- Seat: Buffalo
- Largest town: Laverne

Area
  - Total: 1,041 sq mi (2,700 km^{2})
  - Land: 1,039 sq mi (2,690 km^{2})
  - Water: 2.0 sq mi (5.2 km^{2}) 0.2%

Population (2020)
  - Total: 3,272
  - Estimate (2025): 3,172 ▼
  - Density: 3.149/sq mi (1.216/km^{2})
- Time zone: UTC−6 (Central)
  - Summer (DST): UTC−5 (CDT)
- Congressional district: 3rd

Harper County is a county located in the U.S. state of Oklahoma. As of the 2020 census, the population was 3,272, making it the third-least populous county in Oklahoma. The county seat is Buffalo. It was created in 1907 from the northwestern part of Woodward County, and named for Oscar Green Harper, who was clerk of the Oklahoma Constitutional Convention.

== History ==
During the late 19th century, the area now known as Harper County was part of the Cherokee Outlet, reserved for use by the Cherokee Nation by treaties in 1828 and 1835, The U.S. government opened the outlet for settlement by non-Indians in 1893. The area was divided into counties after the formation of what is now the state of Oklahoma. Harper County was created in 1907. It was named for Oscar Green Harper, who was a local resident, school teacher, and served as clerk of the Oklahoma Constitutional Convention.

The present county lay on several trails that were blazed during the 19th century. One of the most significant was the Fort Dodge to Camp Supply Military Trail. It was used followed in 1868 by the U.S. Army's Seventh Cavalry, to move men and supplies to build Camp Supply (forerunner of the present town of Fort Supply, Oklahoma). The Great Western Trail (also known as the Dodge City Trail) was first used between South Texas and Fort Robinson, Nebraska, in 1874. The Cimarron Valley Turnpike Company built a bridge over the Cimarron River in 1908 to facilitate travel between Englewood, Kansas and Oklahoma.

A 1908 election was held to determine whether Buffalo or Doby Springs would become the county seat. Buffalo won the election. Doby Springs later ceased to be a town and is now a park in Buffalo. Other ghost towns in the county are Paruna, Flat, Avis, Readout, Cross, Alto, Cupid, and Stockholm.

Railroads first came to Harper County in 1912, when the Wichita Falls and Northwestern Railway, a subsidiary of the Missouri, Kansas and Texas Railway (MK&T), built a line through Dunlap, May, Laverne, and Rosston. The locally owned Buffalo and Northwestern Railroad (B&NW), connected Buffalo with Waynoka in 1919–20. The Atchison, Topeka and Santa Fe Railway acquired the B&NW in 1920. The MK&T line was abandoned in 1970.

== Geography ==
According to the U.S. Census Bureau, the county has a total area of 1,041 square miles (2,700 km^{2}), of which 1,039 square miles (2,690 km^{2}) is land and 2.0 square miles (5.2 km^{2}) (0.2%) is water. The county is drained by the Cimarron River and the Beaver River.

=== Major highways ===
- U.S. Highway 64
- U.S. Highway 183
- U.S. Highway 270 / U.S. Highway 412 / State Highway 3
- U.S. Highway 283
- State Highway 34
- State Highway 46
- State Highway 149

=== Adjacent counties ===
- Comanche County, Kansas (northeast)
- Woods County (east)
- Woodward County (southeast)
- Ellis County (south)
- Beaver County (west)
- Clark County, Kansas (northwest)

== Demographics ==
Historical population
Census	Pop.	Note	%±
1910	8,189		—
1920	7,623		−6.9%
1930	7,761		1.8%
1940	6,454		−16.8%
1950	5,777		−10.5%
1960	5,956		3.1%
1970	5,151		−13.5%
1980	4,715		−8.5%
1990	4,063		−13.8%
2000	3,562		−12.3%
2010	3,685		3.5%
2020	3,272		−11.2%
2025 (est.)	3,172	▼	−3.1%
U.S. Decennial Census; 1790-1960 1900-1990; 1990-2000 2010

=== 2020 census ===
As of the 2020 United States census, the county had a population of 3,272. Of the residents, 25.2% were under the age of 18 and 22.0% were 65 years of age or older; the median age was 42.2 years. For every 100 females there were 100.4 males, and for every 100 females age 18 and over there were 97.4 males.

The racial makeup of the county was 76.0% White, 0.1% Black or African American, 1.5% American Indian and Alaska Native, none Asian, 14.3% from some other race, and 7.9% from two or more races. Hispanic or Latino residents of any race comprised 22.4% of the population.

There were 1,344 households in the county, of which 31.4% had children under the age of 18 living with them and 23.7% had a female householder with no spouse or partner present. About 30.8% of all households were made up of individuals and 15.5% had someone living alone who was 65 years of age or older.

There were 1,714 housing units, of which 21.6% were vacant. Among occupied housing units, 76.5% were owner-occupied and 23.5% were renter-occupied. The homeowner vacancy rate was 1.5% and the rental vacancy rate was 23.3%.

=== 2000 census ===
As of the census of 2000, there were 3,562 people, 1,509 households, and 1,030 families residing in the county. The population density was 3 people per square mile (1.2 people/km^{2}). There were 1,863 housing units at an average density of 2 units per square mile (0.77/km^{2}). The racial makeup of the county was 95.87% White, 0.03% Black or African American, 0.93% Native American, 0.08% Asian, 0.03% Pacific Islander, 2.36% from other races, and 0.70% from two or more races. 5.64% of the population were Hispanic or Latino of any race.

There were 1,509 households, out of which 28.00% had children under the age of 18 living with them, 58.60% were married couples living together, 6.50% had a female householder with no husband present, and 31.70% were non-families. 29.20% of all households were made up of individuals, and 15.60% had someone living alone who was 65 years of age or older. The average household size was 2.33 and the average family size was 2.87.

In the county, the population was spread out, with 23.30% under the age of 18, 6.40% from 18 to 24, 23.40% from 25 to 44, 25.20% from 45 to 64, and 21.70% who were 65 years of age or older. The median age was 43 years. For every 100 females there were 96.60 males. For every 100 females age 18 and over, there were 95.20 males.

The median income for a household in the county was $33,705, and the median income for a family was $40,907. Males had a median income of $27,896 versus $20,784 for females. The per capita income for the county was $18,011. About 7.10% of families and 10.20% of the population were below the poverty line, including 15.90% of those under age 18 and 4.00% of those age 65 or over.

== Politics ==
At the presidential level, Harper County is one of the most overwhelmingly Republican counties in Oklahoma, with more than 85% of the vote going to the Republican candidate in each of the past four presidential elections. Democrats have not won the county at the presidential level since Harry Truman in 1948. This dominance is also reflected in the large voter registration advantage that Republicans have in the county.

Voter Registration and Party Enrollment as of June 30, 2023
Party	Number of Voters	Percentage
Democratic	263	13.81%
Republican	1,469	77.11%
Others	173	9.08%
Total	1,905	100%

United States presidential election results for Harper County, Oklahoma
Year	Republican		Democratic		Third party(ies)	
Year	No.	%	No.	%	No.	%
1908	876	47.90%	746	40.79%	207	11.32%
1912	679	45.27%	523	34.87%	298	19.87%
1916	662	35.08%	798	42.29%	427	22.63%
1920	1,404	60.03%	753	32.19%	182	7.78%
1924	1,226	50.77%	824	34.12%	365	15.11%
1928	1,844	66.45%	872	31.42%	59	2.13%
1932	783	26.80%	2,139	73.20%	0	0.00%
1936	1,068	36.69%	1,836	63.07%	7	0.24%
1940	1,616	52.59%	1,419	46.18%	38	1.24%
1944	1,394	56.37%	1,056	42.70%	23	0.93%
1948	1,221	48.80%	1,281	51.20%	0	0.00%
1952	2,057	73.65%	736	26.35%	0	0.00%
1956	1,596	68.44%	736	31.56%	0	0.00%
1960	2,057	73.44%	744	26.56%	0	0.00%
1964	1,379	52.65%	1,240	47.35%	0	0.00%
1968	1,483	63.00%	518	22.01%	353	15.00%
1972	1,976	79.84%	385	15.56%	114	4.61%
1976	1,303	56.16%	978	42.16%	39	1.68%
1980	1,652	74.08%	517	23.18%	61	2.74%
1984	1,748	81.45%	373	17.38%	25	1.16%
1988	1,281	67.42%	593	31.21%	26	1.37%
1992	1,038	51.01%	486	23.88%	511	25.11%
1996	1,036	58.27%	511	28.74%	231	12.99%
2000	1,296	77.01%	374	22.22%	13	0.77%
2004	1,397	83.90%	268	16.10%	0	0.00%
2008	1,342	85.86%	221	14.14%	0	0.00%
2012	1,261	87.94%	173	12.06%	0	0.00%
2016	1,318	87.93%	134	8.94%	47	3.14%
2020	1,327	89.24%	136	9.15%	24	1.61%
2024	1,284	88.49%	147	10.13%	20	1.38%

== Communities ==
=== Towns ===
- Buffalo (county seat)
- Laverne
- May
- Rosston

=== Unincorporated communities ===
- Doby Springs (ghost town)
- Selman (also a census-designated place)

== See also ==
- National Register of Historic Places listings in Harper County, Oklahoma
