= New Mexico State Road 238 =

State highway in New Mexico, United States

State Road 238

Route information
- Maintained by NMDOT
- Length: 19.466 mi (31.327 km)

Major junctions
- South end: NM 529 near Hobbs
- North end: US 82 near Lovington

Location
- Country: United States
- State: New Mexico
- Counties: Lea

Highway system
- New Mexico State Highway System; Interstate; US; State; Scenic
← NM 237	→ NM 239

State Road 238 (NM 238) is a 19.466-mile-long (31.327 km) state highway in the US state of New Mexico. NM 238's southern terminus is at NM 529 west of Hobbs, and the northern terminus is at U.S. Route 82 (US 82) west of Lovington.

== Major intersections ==
The entire route is in Lea County.

Location	mi	km	Destinations	Notes
	0.000	0.000	NM 529	Southern terminus
	19.466	31.327	US 82	Northern terminus
1.000 mi = 1.609 km; 1.000 km = 0.621 mi
