= Lea County Airport =

Lea County Airport may refer to airports in Lea County, New Mexico:

- Lea County Regional Airport (IATA: HOB, ICAO: KHOB) near Hobbs, New Mexico
- Lea County-Jal Airport (FAA LID: E26) near Jal, New Mexico
- Lea County-Zip Franklin Memorial Airport (FAA LID: E06) near Lovington, New Mexico
