= Texas State Highway 83 =

State highway in Texas, United States

State Highway 83
- SH 83 highlighted in red

Route information
- Maintained by TxDOT
- Length: 56.053 mi (90.209 km)
- Existed: 1955–present

Major junctions
- West end: NM 132 / FM 769 east of Lovington, NM
- SH 214 in and south of Denver City; US 62 / US 385 in Seagraves
- East end: SH 137 in Welch

Location
- Country: United States
- State: Texas
- Counties: Yoakum, Gaines, Dawson

Highway system
- Highways in Texas; Interstate; US; State; Former; Toll; Loops; Spurs; FM/RM; Park; Rec
← US 83	→ US 84

State Highway 83 (SH 83) is a 56.053-mile (90.209 km) state highway in Yoakum, Gaines, and Dawson counties in Texas, United States, that connects New Mexico State Road 132 (NM 132) and Farm to Market Road 769 (FM 769) at the New Mexico state line with Texas State Highway 137 (SH 137) in Welch, via Denver City and Seagraves.

== Route description ==
SH 83 runs primarily through rural agricultural area and (xcept for a short stretch in and just southeast of Seagraves) is a two-lane road.

=== Yoakum County ===
SH 83 begins at an intersection on the New Mexico state line in the southwestern corner of Yoakum County, just over 13 miles [21 km] due west of Denver City. (From the intersection NM 132 heads west into New Mexico toward Lovington, FM 769 heads north along the state line toward Bledsoe, and County Road 251 heads south as a dirt road (also along the state line) in Gaines County to end at Farm to Market Road 1757.)

From its western terminus, SH 83 heads due east, roughly 1,900 feet (580 m) north of and paralleling the Yoakum-Gaines county line. After 10.2 miles (16.4 km), and connecting with multiple county roads, SH 83 reaches a T intersection with the southern end of Farm to Market Road 796 (which heads north toward the unincorporated community of Allred). Approximately 2.1 miles (3.4 km) farther east, after passing along the north edge of the Denver City Memorial Park cemetery, SH 83 begins running along the border of Denver City on West Broadway Street, before fully entering the city roughly 3,000 feet (910 m) later. As it approached Denver City, SH 83 wided to a five-lane road and then entered an oil field with multiple nodding donkey pumps (pumpjacks) that surrounds city.

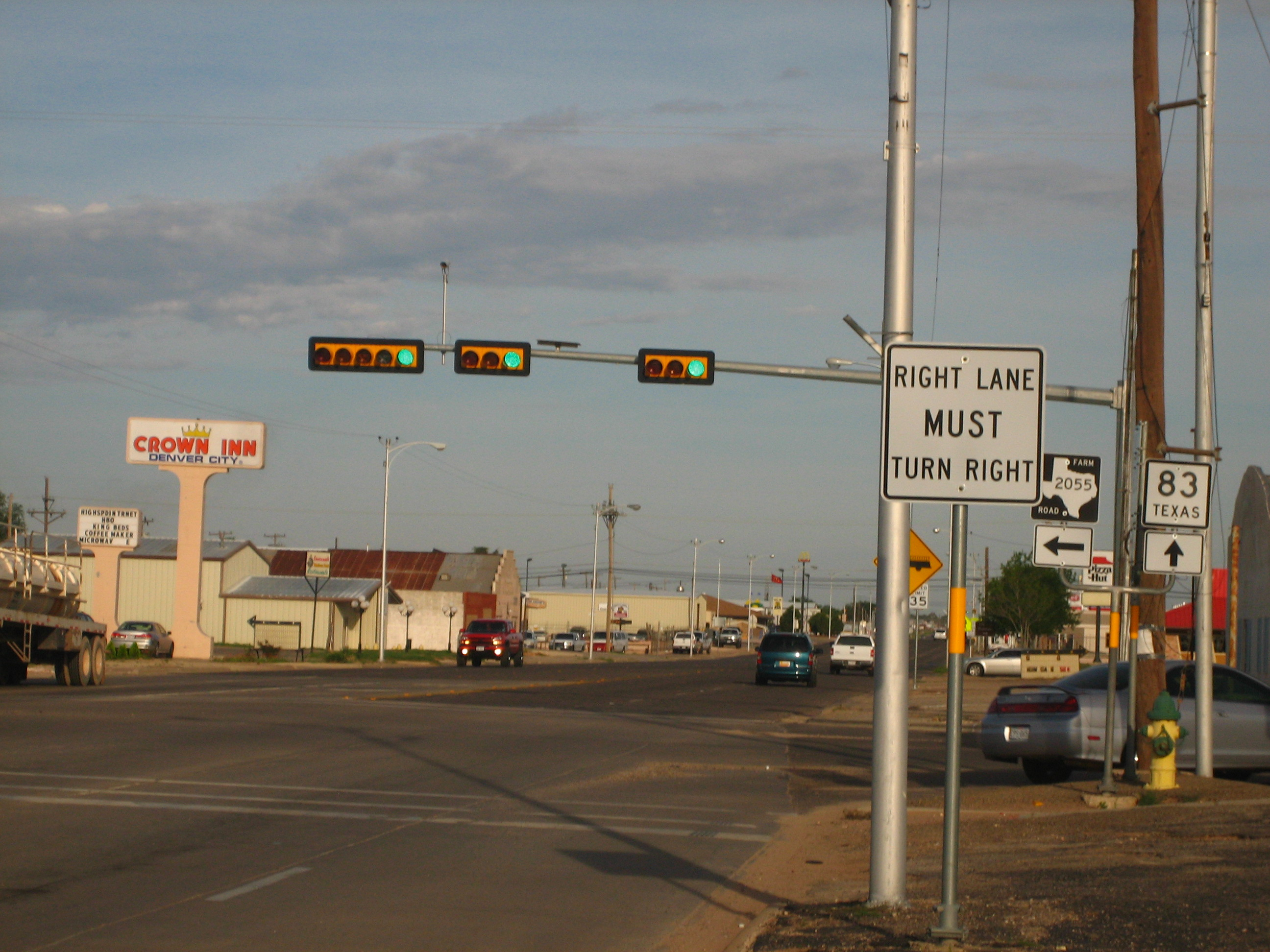
Eastbound SH 83 in Denver City, at the southern end of Farm to Market Road 2055, July 2008

Ten blocks after entering Denver City, SH 83 reaches its junction with Farm to Market Road 2055 (FM 2055) at Main Avenue in the downtown area. (While North Main Avenue heads north to the northern edge of the city, FM 2055 [South Main Avenue] heads south to leave the city before connecting with west end of Farm to Market Road 2056 [FM 2056] and then ending at Farm to Market Road 1725.) Ten blocks farther east SH 83 reaches its northern junction with Texas State Highway 214 (Plains Highway / SH 214) on the eastern limits of the city. (From that intersection, SH 214 heads north toward Plains and County Road 390 [Light Plant Road] heads east toward Seagraves.) SH 83 heads south as a five-lane road concurrently with SH 214, but quickly curves to head south-southeast and loses one of its northbound lanes. While still along the city limit line, SH 83 / SH 214 leaves Yoakum County and enters Gaines County.

=== Gaines County ===
Shortly after SH 83 / SH 214 enters Gaines County, the highway entirely leaves Denver City and continues as a three-lane road (two northbound lanes and one southbound lane) through the oil field surrounding the city. About one mile (1.6 km) south of the city, SH 83 reaches its southern junction with SH 214 at an intersection with FM 2056. (From that intersection SH 214 heads southeast toward Seminole and FM 2056 heads west to end at FM 2055.) Heading due east again as two-lane road, SH 83 leaves the oil field. After approximately 13.4 miles (21.6 km) and connecting with several more county roads, the highway enters the city of Seagraves.

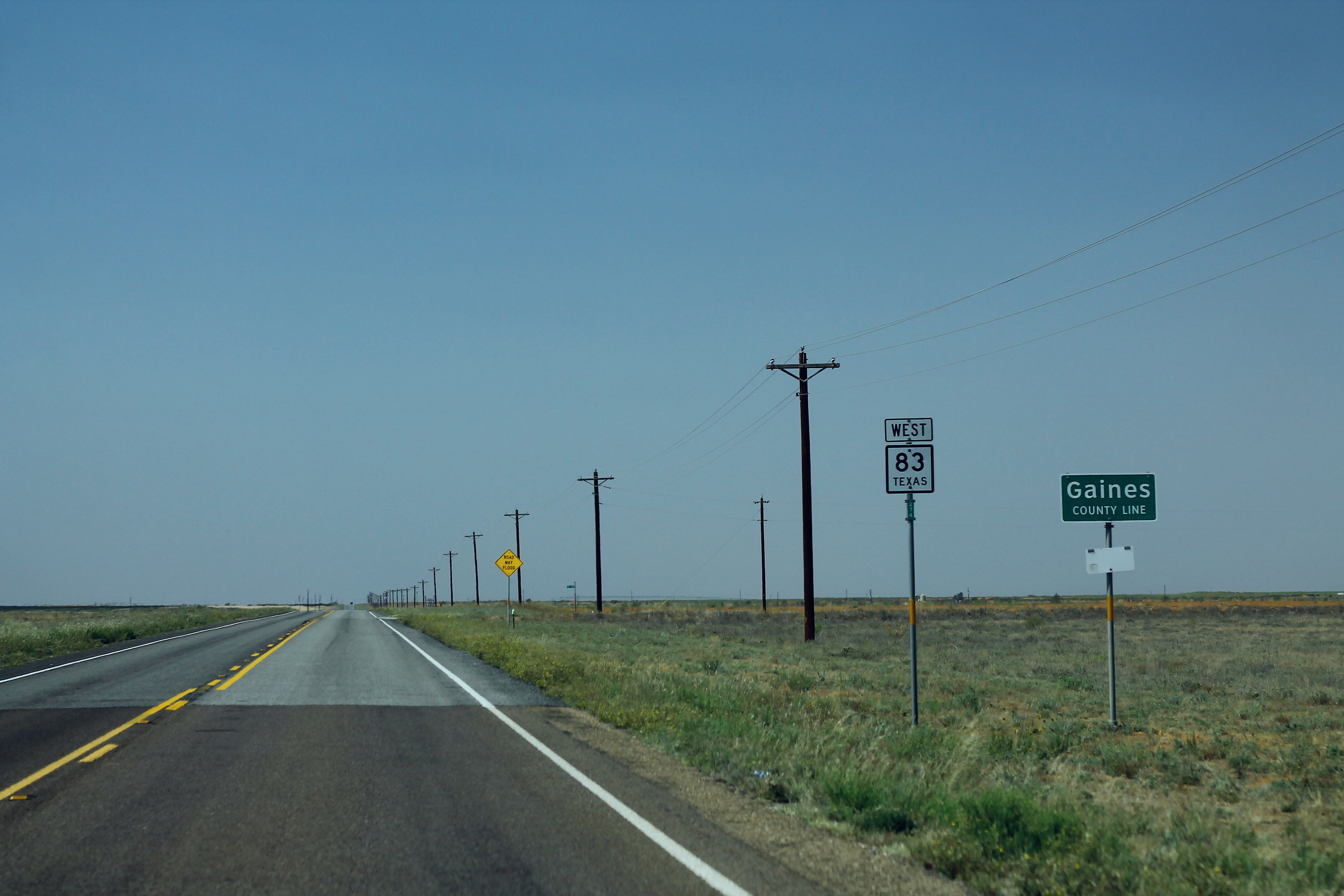
Westbound SH 83 at the Gaines County line, September 2020

Within Seagraves SH 83 runs along 12th Street and, after about 1.2 miles (1.9 km), it reaches its junction with U.S. Route 62 / U.S. Route 385 (Railroad Avene / US 62 / US 385) near the eastern end of the city. (From that intersection Railroad Avene / US 62 / US 385 heads northeast toward Wellman and Brownfield and heads southwest toward Seminole.) Continuing due east, but after crossing a set of railroad tracks, SH 83 promptly connects with the north end of Farm to Market Road 1429 (FM 1429) at a T intersection on the eastern city limit. (FM 1429 heads south to end at U.S. Route 180 [US 180].)

Approximately 1.7 miles (2.7 km) east of Seagraves, SH 83 curves to head south-southeast (while County Road 132 continues due east). About 5.5 miles (8.9 km) farther on, after connecting with several more county roads, SH 83 enters the census-designated place (CDP) of Loop and then curves to head due east once again. SH 83 then reaches its junction with Farm to Market Road 303 (FM 303) in the center of the community. (FM 303 heads north toward Wellman and south to end at US 180.) After leaving the CDP, SH 83 continues due east for 8.0 miles (12.9 km) to reach its junction with the north end of Farm to Market Road 1067 (FM 1067) at a T intersection. (FM 1067 heads south to end at Farm to Market Road 1066, just north of White City.) Three miles (4.8 km) east of FM 1067 SH 83 leaves Gaines County to enter Dawson County.

=== Dawson County ===
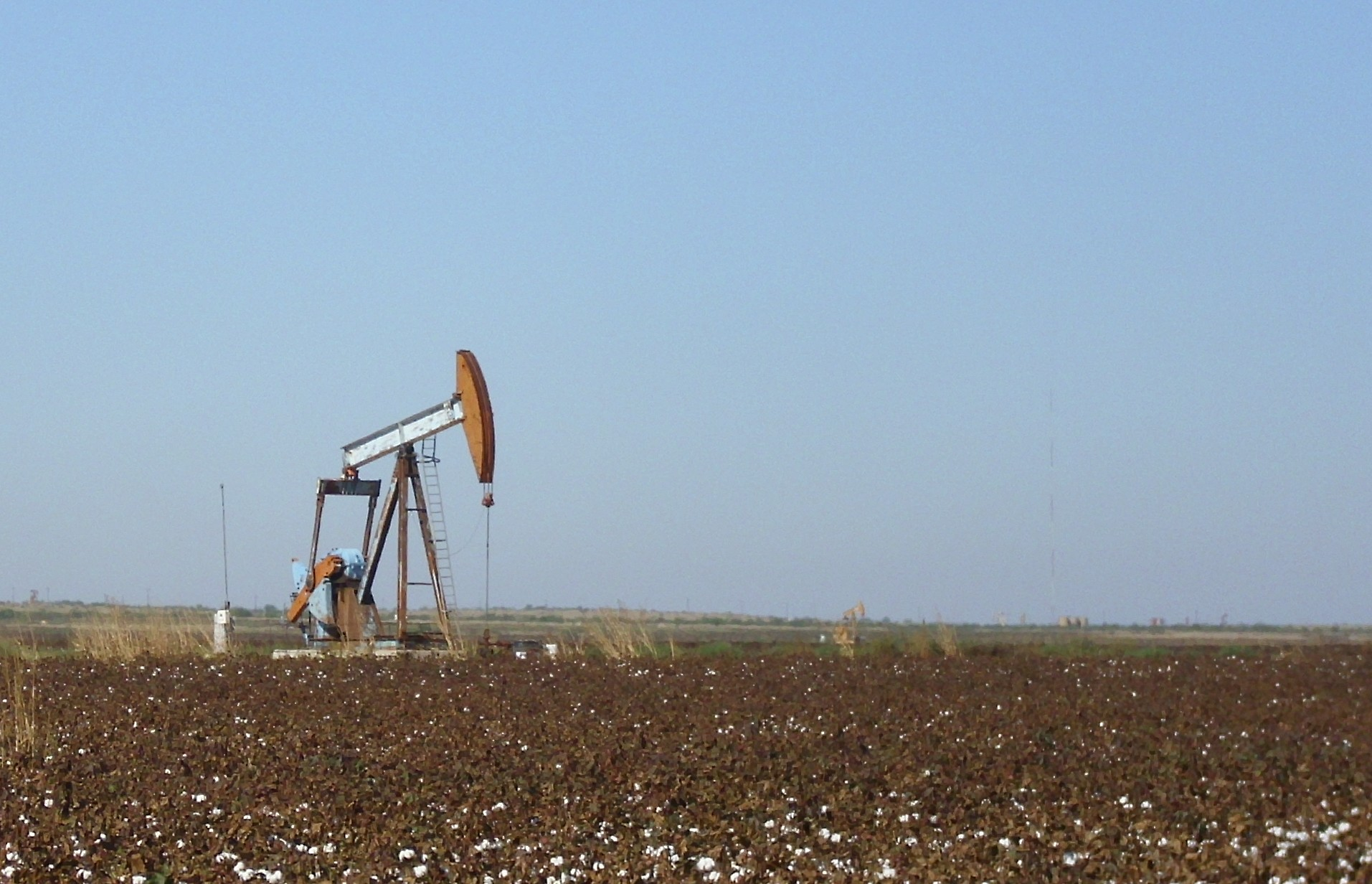
Nodding donkey pump (pumpjack), similar to those located along SH 83

Just after entering Dawson County, SH 83 curves east-northeast as it passes through another oil field. About 4.2 miles (6.8 km) after entering Dawson County, SH 83 enters the CDP of Welch along Jupiter Street. Approximately 0.6 miles (0.97 km) later SH 83 has its junction with Farm to Market Road 829 (FM 829) at the south end of Main Street. (FM 829 heads north along Main Street to end at SH 137, on the north edge of the CDP. FM 829 also heads south to end at US 180.) Three blocks later SH 83 reaches its eastern terminus at an intersection with SH 137 and County Road 3 (CR 3) on the southeastern edge of the main part of the community. (SH 137 heads north-northwest toward Brownfield and south-southeast toward Lamesa. CR 3 heads east toward O'Donnell.)

== History ==

The original SH 83 was designated, on August 21, 1923, along a route from Lamesa east to an intersection with SH 18 in western Shackelford County as a renumbering of SH 18B. On May 21, 1928, SH 83 was extended west to the New Mexico state line to connect with New Mexico State Road 83. The route was transferred to SH 15 (now US 180) on August 8, 1935, though the change was not effective until September 1, 1935. New Mexico State Road 83 was realigned in the 1950s, connecting with SH 328 instead. On March 31, 1955, SH 328 was renumbered to SH 83 "for the convenience of the traveling public" In 1988, the New Mexico connecting highway was renumbered New Mexico State Road 132.

== Major intersections ==
County	Location	mi	km	Destinations	Notes
Yoakum		0.0	0.0	NM 132 west – Lovington	Continuation west beyond western teriminus into New Mexico
Yoakum		0.0	0.0	FM 796 north – US 380, Bledsoe; CR 132 south – FM 1757	Western terminus
Yoakum		10.2	16.4	FM 1622 north – Allred	T intersection
Yoakum	Denver City	13.6	21.9	North Main Avenue north FM 2055 south (South Main Avenue) – FM 2056, FM 1757	
Yoakum	Denver City	14.2	22.9	SH 214 north (Plains Highway) – Plains; CR 390 east (Ligh Plant Road)	Western end of SH 114 concurrency
Gaines		15.7	25.3	SH 214 south – Seminole FM 2056 west – FM 2055	Eastern end of SH 114 concurrency
Gaines		27.5	44.3	FM 1780 north – Whiteface	T intersection
Gaines	Seagraves	30.4	48.9	US 62 east / US 385 north (Railroad Avenue) – Wellman, Brownfield US 62 west / US 385 south (Railroad Avenue) – Seminole	
Gaines	Seagraves	30.5	49.1	FM 1429 south – US 180	T intersection
Gaines	Loop	38.9	62.6	FM 303 north – Wellman FM 303 south – US 180	
Gaines		47.9	77.1	FM 1067 south – FM 1066, White City	T intersection
Dawson	Welch	55.7	89.6	FM 829 north (Main Street) – SH 137 FM 829 south – US 180	
Dawson	Welch	56.1	90.3	SH 137 north – Brownfield SH 137 south – Lamesa, Stanton	Eastern terminus
Dawson	Welch	56.1	90.3	CR 3 east – O'Donnell	Continuation east from eastern terminus
1.000 mi = 1.609 km; 1.000 km = 0.621 mi: Concurrency terminus	Welch				

== See also ==
- List of state highways in Texas
