= U.S. Route 62 in New Mexico =

Segment of American highway

U.S. Highway 62
- US 62 highlighted in red

Route information
- Maintained by NMDOT
- Length: 111.710 mi (179.780 km)
- Existed: 1932–present

Major junctions
- West end: US 62 / US 180 at the Texas state line in State Line, TX
- US 285 in Carlsbad; NM 18 in Hobbs
- East end: US 62 / US 180 at the Texas state line near Hobbs

Location
- Country: United States
- State: New Mexico
- Counties: Eddy, Lea

Highway system
- United States Numbered Highway System; List; Special; Divided; New Mexico State Highway System; Interstate; US; State; Scenic
← NM 61	US 62	→ NM 63

U.S. Route 62 (US 62) is part of the U.S. Highway System. US 62 travels from the United States–Mexico border at El Paso, Texas, to Niagara Falls, New York. In the U.S. state of New Mexico, US 62 extends from the Texas state line southwest of Whites City and ends at the Texas state line east of Hobbs.

== Route description ==
Through New Mexico, US 62 is entirely concurrent with US 180. The highway continues past Carlsbad Caverns National Park and White's City into the city of Carlsbad. In Carlsbad, US 285 joins US 62/US 180 for approximately 2.2 miles (3.5 km), then heads east to Hobbs. US 62 comes within 12 miles (19 km) of the WIPP Plant while also coming across several State Highway termini: New Mexico State Road 360 (NM 360), NM 176, NM 243, NM 529, NM 483, NM 360, and NM 8 along the 70-mile (110 km) stretch. US 62 comes into Hobbs along Marland Boulevard. After coming close to Hobbs High School's Watson Stadium, US 62 leaves Hobbs going east to the Texas–New Mexico state line.

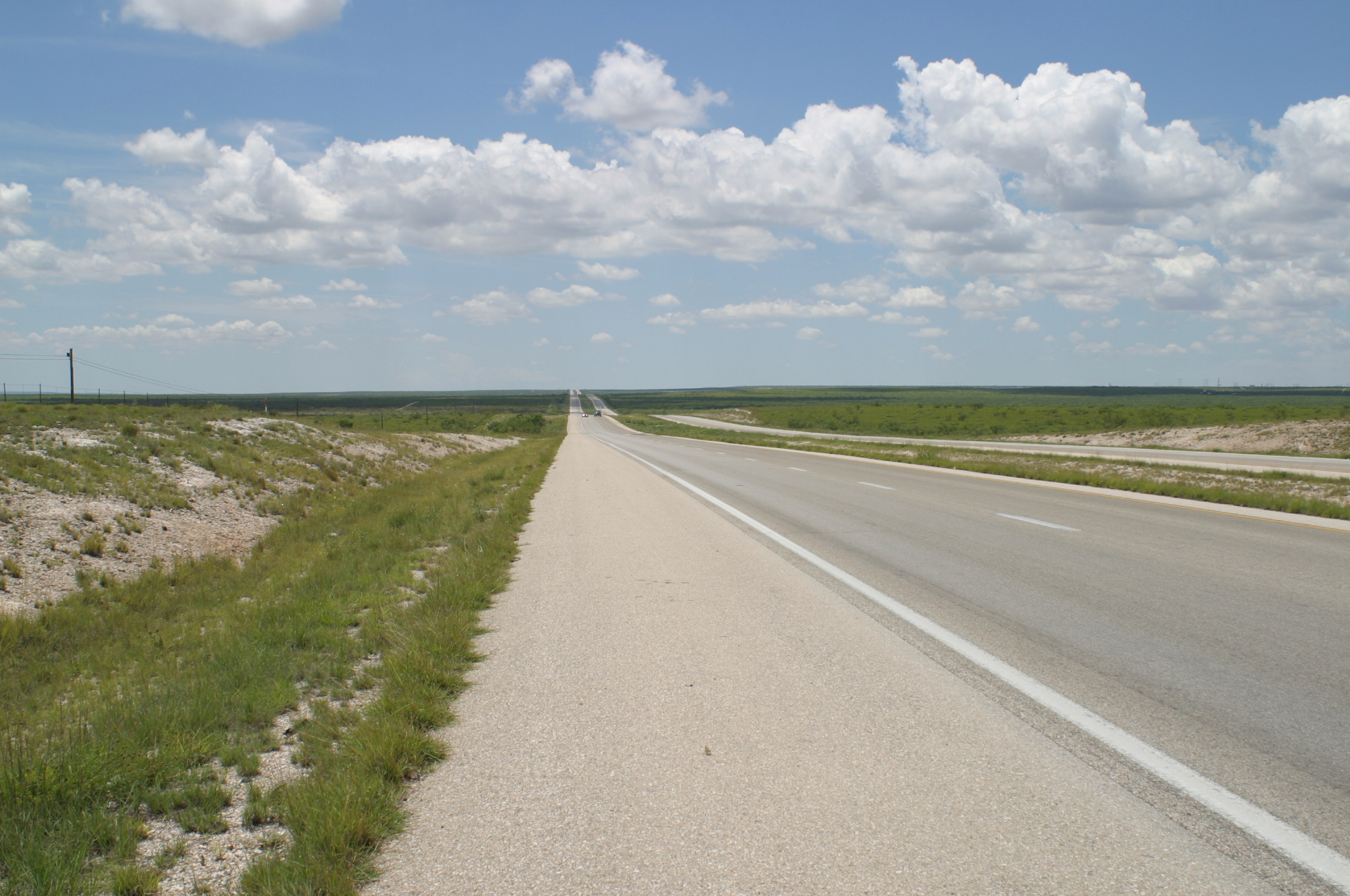
US 62 west of Hobbs, Lea County, New Mexico.

== Major intersections ==
County	Location	mi	km	Destinations	Notes
Eddy		0.000	0.000	US 62 west / US 180 west – El Paso	Continuation into Texas
Eddy	Whites City	15.783	25.400	NM 7 west – Carlsbad Caverns National Park	Eastern terminus of NM 7
Eddy	Carlsbad	33.423	53.789	US 285 south – Loving, Pecos, TX	Western end of US 285 concurrency
Eddy	Carlsbad	34.198	55.036	NM 216 south (Wood Avenue)	Northern terminus of NM 216
Eddy	Carlsbad	35.291	56.795	NM 524 north (Lea Street)	Southern terminus of NM 524
Eddy	Carlsbad	35.536	57.190	US 285 north (Canal Street) – Artesia, N. M. State University at Carlsbad	Eastern end of US 285 concurrency
Eddy	Carlsbad	38.687	62.261	NM 200 west (George Shoup Relief Route) – Artesia	Eastern terminus of NM 200
Eddy		50.686	81.571	NM 360 north – Hackberry Lake	Southern terminus of NM 360
Eddy		53.198	85.614	NM 31 south – Intrepid Potash West	Northern terminus of NM 31
Eddy		55.322	89.032	NM 355 north	Southern terminus of NM 355
Eddy		62.446	100.497	NM 243 east	Western terminus of NM 243
Lea		90.112	145.021	NM 176 east / NM 243 west – Eunice, Jal	Western terminus of NM 176, eastern terminus of NM 243
Lea		92.072	148.176	NM 529 west – Loco Hills, Artesia	Eastern terminus of NM 529
Lea		97.075	156.227	NM 483 north – Lovington, Tatum, Portales	Southern terminus of NM 483
Lea		102.015	164.177	NM 8 south – Monument, Eunice	Northern terminus of NM 8
Lea	Hobbs	105.109	169.157	Southwest County Road (NM 208 north) – Lovington, Eunice	Southern terminus of NM 208
Lea	Hobbs	108.046	173.883	NM 18 (Dal Paso Street) – Lovington, Eunice	
Lea	Hobbs	109.710	176.561	NM 218 west (East Bender Boulevard)	Eastern terminus of NM 218
Lea	Hobbs	111.710	179.780	US 62 east / US 180 east – Seminole	Continuation into Texas
1.000 mi = 1.609 km; 1.000 km = 0.621 mi: Concurrency terminus

U.S. Route 62
Previous state: Texas	New Mexico	Next state: Texas
