= Texas & New Mexico Railway =

Short-line railroad

Overview
- Headquarters: Wolfforth, Texas
- Reporting mark: TXN
- Locale: Texas, New Mexico
- Dates of operation: 2015–present
- Predecessor: Texas - New Mexico Railroad (1926 - 2015)

Technical
- Track gauge: 4 ft 8 1/2 in (1,435 mm)
- Length: 111 miles (179 km)

The Texas & New Mexico Railway (reporting mark TXN) is a class III short-line railroad operating in west Texas and southeast New Mexico. The railroad line operates on 111 miles of track from a connection with the Union Pacific at Monahans, Texas, and terminates at Lovington, New Mexico. The railroad primarily provides freight service for the oilfields and related industries in the region.

== History ==
Lovington, New Mexico is the terminus of the TNMR. Before 1930, the planned Gulf, Texas and New Mexico Railway proposed to construct a branch running westward from Seminole, Texas via Lovington, NM and terminating at Roswell, New Mexico. However, the tracks were never constructed, and for a time the nearest rail line was the Atchison, Topeka and Santa Fe Railway in nearby Seagraves, Texas.

As a result of the oil discovered in the Permian Basin in 1927, the Texas–New Mexico Railway was incorporated on November 19, 1927. Within a year the railroad fell under the control of the Texas & Pacific Railway. Construction commenced in 1928 and the line was completed on July 20, 1930. In 1989, what was then Union Pacific sold the property to RailTex, and short line service started on September 18, 1989. Railtex sold to RailAmerica in February 2000, which in turn sold to Permian Basin Railways in May 2002. In September 2011, Iowa Pacific Holdings, which owned Permian Basin Railways, announced a major rebuilding of the railroad, including track upgrades and new locomotives, at a cost of more than $20 million.

In May 2015 Watco purchased the assets of the Texas – New Mexico Railroad from Iowa Pacific Holdings, and renamed the railroad the Texas & New Mexico Railway.

== Ownership of the line ==
- 1930–1976: Operated as a subsidiary of the Texas & Pacific Railway (TP), which was a subsidiary of the Missouri Pacific Railroad (MP)
- 1976–1982: Operated by the Missouri Pacific Railroad
- 1982–1989: Operated by the Union Pacific
- 1989–1999: Owned/operated by RailTex
- 1999–2002: Owned/operated by RailAmerica
- 2002–2015: Owned/operated by Permian Basin Railways
- 2015–present: Owned/operated by Watco.

== Route ==
- Monahans, Texas (interchange with Union Pacific Railroad mainline)
- Cloyd, Texas (no longer shown in timetables)
- Prairie Spur, Texas (no longer Shown in timetables)
- Wink Junction (no longer shown in timetables - abandoned branch to Wink, Texas)
- Kermit, Texas
- Magwait, Texas
- Cheyenne, Texas (no longer shown in timetables)
- Jal, New Mexico
- Combest, New Mexico
- United Carbon
- Eunice, New Mexico
- Kornegray, New Mexico (no longer shown in timetables)
- Warren, New Mexico
- Climax, New Mexico
- Hobbs, New Mexico (yard/office)
- Permco (Airfield) (no longer shown in timetables)
- Kimbrough, New Mexico (no longer shown in timetables)
- Southern Union Oil
- Lea County Oil
- Lovington, New Mexico

== See also ==
- Fort Worth & Denver Railway
- Roscoe, Snyder and Pacific Railway
- West Texas and Lubbock Railway
