= New Mexico State Road 529 =

State highway in New Mexico, United States

State Road 529
- NM 529 highlighted in red

Route information
- Maintained by NMDOT
- Length: 31.307 mi (50.384 km)

Major junctions
- West end: US 82 near Loco Hills
- East end: US 62 / US 180 near Hobbs

Location
- Country: United States
- State: New Mexico
- Counties: Eddy, Lea

Highway system
- New Mexico State Highway System; Interstate; US; State; Scenic
← NM 528	→ NM 531

State Road 529 (NM 529) is a 31.307-mile-long (50.384 km) state highway in the US state of New Mexico. NM 529's western terminus is at U.S. Route 82 (US 82) east of Loco Hills, and the eastern terminus is at US 62 and US 180 west of Hobbs.

== Major intersections ==
County	Location	mi	km	Destinations	Notes
Eddy		0.000	0.000	US 82	Western terminus
Lea		28.734	46.243	NM 238 north	Southern terminus of NM 238
Lea		31.307	50.384	US 62 / US 180	Eastern terminus
1.000 mi = 1.609 km; 1.000 km = 0.621 mi
