= New Mexico State Road 218 =

Highway in New Mexico

State Road 218
- NM 218 highlighted in red

Route information
- Maintained by NMDOT
- Length: 1.709 mi (2.750 km)

Major junctions
- West end: NM 18 / NM 132 in Hobbs
- East end: US 62 / US 180 in Hobbs

Location
- Country: United States
- State: New Mexico
- Counties: Lea

Highway system
- New Mexico State Highway System; Interstate; US; State; Scenic
← NM 217	→ NM 219

State Road 218 (NM 218) is a 1.7-mile-long (2.7 km) state highway in the US state of New Mexico. NM 218's western terminus is at NM 18 and NM 132 in Hobbs, and the eastern terminus is at U.S. Route 62 (US 62) and US 180 in Hobbs.

== Major intersections ==
The entire route is in Hobbs, Lea County.

mi	km	Destinations	Notes
0.000	0.000	NM 18 / NM 132 north	Western terminus, southern terminus of NM 132
1.709	2.750	US 62 / US 180	Eastern terminus
1.000 mi = 1.609 km; 1.000 km = 0.621 mi
