= New Mexico State Road 483 =

State highway in New Mexico, United States

State Road 483

Route information
- Maintained by NMDOT
- Length: 16.200 mi (26.071 km)

Major junctions
- South end: US 62 / US 180 in Arkansas Junction
- North end: NM 18 in Lovington

Location
- Country: United States
- State: New Mexico
- Counties: Lea

Highway system
- New Mexico State Highway System; Interstate; US; State; Scenic
← NM 480	→ NM 484

State Road 483 (NM 483) is a 16.2-mile-long (26.1 km) state highway in the US state of New Mexico. NM 483's southern terminus is at U.S. Route 62 (US 62) and US 180 in Arkansas Junction, and the northern terminus is at NM 18 in Lovington.

== Major intersections ==
The entire route is in Lea County.

Location	mi	km	Destinations	Notes
Arkansas Junction	0.000	0.000	US 62 / US 180	Southern terminus
Lovington	16.200	26.071	NM 18	Northern terminus
1.000 mi = 1.609 km; 1.000 km = 0.621 mi
