= New Mexico State Road 133 =

State highway in New Mexico, United States

State Road 133

Route information
- Maintained by NMDOT
- Length: 3.60 mi (5.79 km)

Major junctions
- West end: NM 132 north of Hobbs
- East end: FM 1757 at the Texas/ New Mexico border

Location
- Country: United States
- State: New Mexico
- Counties: Lea

Highway system
- New Mexico State Highway System; Interstate; US; State; Scenic
← NM 132	→ NM 134

State Road 133 (NM 133) is a very short state highway in the US state of New Mexico. Its total length is approximately 3.60 miles (5.79 km). NM 133's western terminus is at NM 132 North of Hobbs, and the eastern terminus is at Farm to Market Road 1757 (FM 1757) at the Texas–New Mexico state line.

== Major intersections ==
The entire route is in Lea County.

Location	mi	km	Destinations	Notes
	0.000	0.000	NM 132	Western terminus
	3.60	5.79	FM 1757	Eastern terminus at the Texas–New Mexico state line
1.000 mi = 1.609 km; 1.000 km = 0.621 mi
