= Tatum School District =

Tatum School District may refer to:

- Tatum Municipal Schools (New Mexico)
- Tatum Independent School District (Texas)
