= New Mexico State Road 208 =

State highway in New Mexico, United States

State Road 208
- NM 208 highlighted in red

Route information
- Maintained by NMDOT
- Length: 3.47 mi (5.58 km)

Major junctions
- South end: US 62 / US 180 near Hobbs
- North end: NM 18 near Hobbs

Location
- Country: United States
- State: New Mexico
- Counties: Lea

Highway system
- New Mexico State Highway System; Interstate; US; State; Scenic
← NM 207	→ NM 209

State Road 208 (NM 208) is a 3.47-mile-long (5.58 km) state highway in the US state of New Mexico. NM 208's southern terminus is at U.S. Route 62 (US 62) and US 180 west of Hobbs, and the northern terminus is at NM 18 northwest of Hobbs.

== Major intersections ==
The entire route is in Lea County.

Location	mi	km	Destinations	Notes
	0.000	0.000	US 62 / US 180	Southern terminus
	3.470	5.584	NM 18	Northern terminus
1.000 mi = 1.609 km; 1.000 km = 0.621 mi
