= Earlene Roberts =

American politician (1935–2013)

Member of the New Mexico House of Representatives
- In office 1989–2005
- Succeeded by: Keith Gardner

Personal details
- Born: August 19, 1935 Oklahoma, U.S.
- Died: August 6, 2013 (aged 77) Lovington, New Mexico, U.S.
- Party: Republican

Earlene Roberts (August 19, 1935 – August 6, 2013) was an American businesswoman and Republican politician from New Mexico.

== Background ==
Roberts was born in Oklahoma on August 19, 1935. She moved to Lovington, New Mexico, where she was a real estate broker, restaurant owner, and farmer.

Roberts served as the treasurer of Lea County, New Mexico for four terms. She then served as a Republican in the New Mexico House of Representatives from 1989 to 2005. During her tenure in the House, she acted as the Republican caucus chair in 1995 and 1996 and minority whip from 1999 to 2002. She was defeated for re-election in 2004 by Keith Gardner.

Roberts died in Lovington, New Mexico in 2013.
