= Lea County Regional Airport =

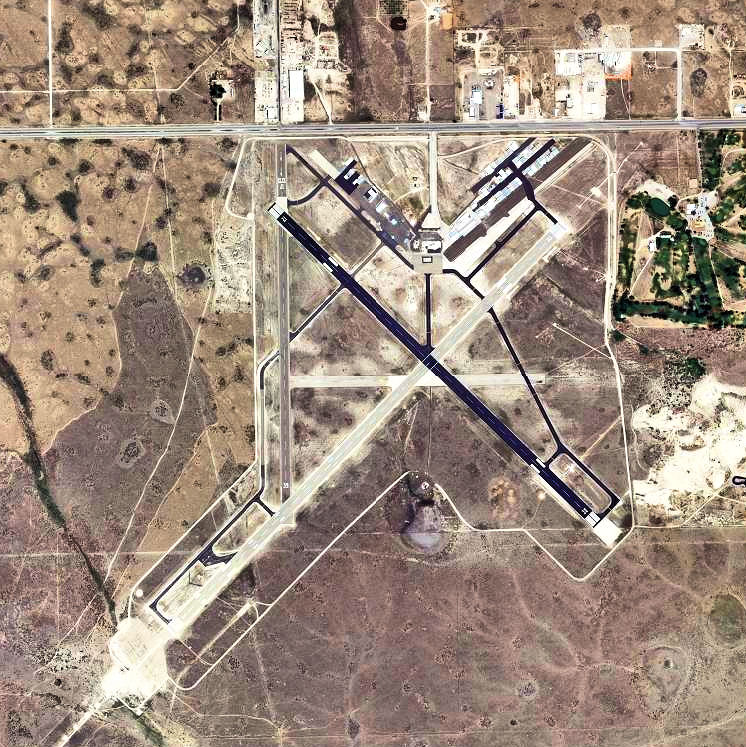
- 2006 USGS airphoto
- IATA: HOB; ICAO: KHOB

Summary
- Airport type: Public
- Operator: Lea County
- Location: Hobbs, New Mexico
- Elevation AMSL: 3,661 ft (1,116 m)
- Coordinates: 32°41′15″N 103°13′01″W

Map
- Location within New Mexico Location within the United States

Runways
Direction	Length		Surface
Direction	ft	m	Surface
3/21	7,398	2,255	Asphalt
12/30	6,002	1,829	Asphalt
17/35	4,998	1,523	Asphalt
- Source: Federal Aviation Administration

Lea County Regional Airport (IATA: HOB, ICAO: KHOB) (Lea County-Hobbs Airport) is four miles (6.4 km) west of Hobbs, in Lea County, New Mexico, United States. The airport covers 898 acres (363 ha) and has three runways. It is an FAA certified commercial airport served daily by United Airlines' affiliates SkyWest Airlines, to DEN, and CommutAir, to IAH. Lea County Regional Airport is the largest of the three airports owned and operated by Lea County Government. Lea County also owns and operates two general aviation airports in Lovington and Jal, New Mexico.

== Facilities ==
The airport covers 898 acres (363 ha) and has three asphalt runways:

- 3/21 – 7,398 × 150 ft (2,255 × 46 m)
- 12/30 – 6,002 × 150 ft (1,829 × 46 m)
- 17/35 – 4,998 × 100 ft (1,523 × 30 m)

In the year ending January 31, 2023 the airport had 15,445 aircraft operations, average 42 per day: 83% general aviation, 14% air taxi, 3% military, and <1% airline. 57 aircraft at the time were based at this airport: 51 single-engine, 3 multi-engine, 2 jet, and 1 helicopter. The airport has one terminal for all arrivals and departures, and two FBOs, Tailwind Aviation and Christian Aero.

The data below lists annual total aircraft operations from 2009 to 2013 from the FAA's air traffic activity system. The percent changes indicate an average of −13.93% in aircraft operations per year over these five years.

Aircraft operations: HOB 2009–2013
Calendar year	Aircraft operations	%
2009	19,908	
2010	16,637	−16.43%
2011	10,752	−35.37%
2012	9,270	−13.78%
2013	8,893	−4.07%

== Airlines and destinations ==
Airlines	Destinations
JSX	Dallas–Love
United Express	Denver, Houston–Intercontinental

Destinations map
Destinations from Lea County Regional Airport
Red = Year-round destination
Blue = Future destination

== Statistics ==
Busiest domestic routes from HOB (May 2024 – April 2025)
Rank	Airport	Passengers	Carriers
1	Houston–Intercontinental, Texas	13,310	United
2	Denver, Colorado	12,520	United

== History ==
Me-Tex Airport opened on July 23, 1937, where the Hobbs golf course is now, next to Lea County Regional Airport. The Me-Tex Supply Company had leased land from the state and built oiled runways and a hangar at Me-Tex.

In 1940, the city of Hobbs passed a bond issue to purchase some adjoining acreage, with the intent of bringing airline service and airmail delivery. Federal grants helped pay for paved runways and taxiways and a terminal building for Hobbs Municipal Airport, which opened during World War II. Me-Tex Airport closed in 1946–47.

Ownership of the airport was transferred from the city of Hobbs to Lea County on November 19, 1945 The terminal building was expanded in the late 2000s and another significant expansion occurred in the late 2010s.

=== Historical airline service ===
The first air mail arrived in Hobbs via Continental Airlines in May 1940, and started passenger flights that year to Albuquerque, El Paso, San Antonio, and Tulsa, each making several stops en route. Service was started using Lockheed Electras and Lodestars, later upgraded to Douglas DC-3s and Convair 340s. As Hobbs was a crossroads on Continental's routes from Albuquerque to San Antonio and from El Paso to Tulsa in the 1950s, passengers were able to change planes at Hobbs between the two routes.

In 1963, Continental Airlines was replaced by Trans-Texas Airways (TTa). Supplemental service was provided by Bison Airlines in 1963–64. TTa started with DC-3s but soon upgraded to Convair 600s. The name was later changed to Texas International Airlines (TI) and nonstop flights to Dallas TX were occasionally operated. For a brief time in 1977/1978 the airline introduced Douglas DC-9 jets to Hobbs but reverted back to Convair 600s. TI's service ended in early 1979, being replaced by Crown Airlines with nonstop flights to Albuquerque and Air Midwest to Albuquerque and Lubbock. Crown Airlines flights ended about a year later and Air Midwest switched the Lubbock flights to Midland/Odessa, TX. Mesa Airlines came to Hobbs in early 1984 with Beechcraft 99s to Albuquerque and Lubbock while Air Midwest left the city late that year. Mesa upgraded to Beechcraft 1900s and was the main airline at Hobbs for over 22 years until they were replaced by New Mexico Airlines in 2007 operating 9-seat Cessna 208 Caravans to Albuquerque, El Paso, and Midland/Odessa. The city was also briefly served by Permian Airways in 1979 with flights to El Paso and Midland/Odessa, and by Big Sky Airlines in 2000/2001 first with nonstop flights to Dallas/Ft. Worth but later a stop in Brownwood, TX was added. New Mexico Airlines left Hobbs in early 2011 and new nonstop service to Houston Bush Airport by Continental Express began on July 1, 2011, using 50-seat Embraer 145 regional jets. Continental Airlines merged into United Airlines in early 2012, changing the Hobbs flights to United Express. The contract carrier operating as United Express switched from ExpressJet to SkyWest Airlines and began flights to Denver on October 27, 2019. The Denver flights were suspended in March of 2020 due to the Covid-19 pandemic, but were reinstated in October of 2021. All United Express flights were switched from SkyWest Airlines to CommuteAir in mid-2022 and back to SkyWest in May, 2024.

== See also ==
- Hobbs, New Mexico
