= Ray Birmingham =

American baseball coach (born 1955)

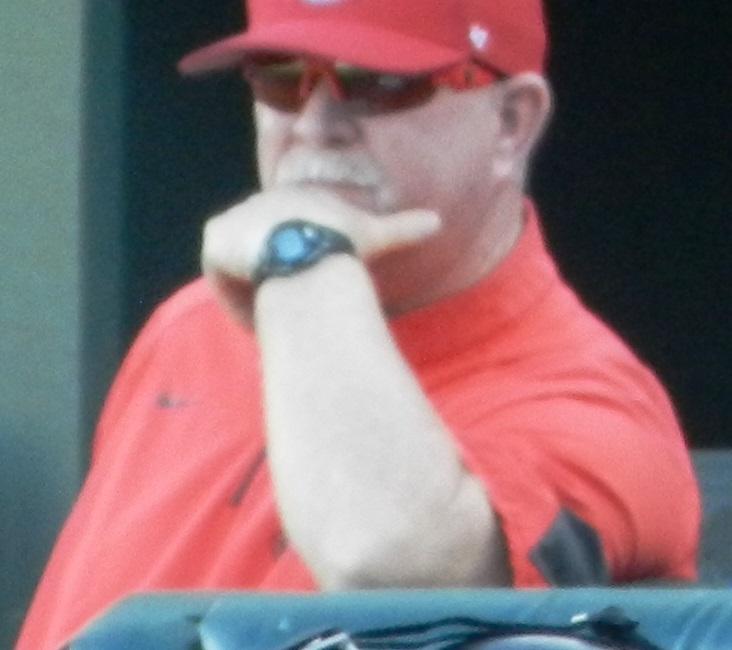
- Birmingham in 2015.

Biographical details
- Born: November 14, 1955 (age 70); Hobbs, New Mexico, U.S.
- Education: New Mexico State University; College of the Southwest

Coaching career (HC unless noted)
- 1981–1983: Mayfield HS
- 1988–1989: Southwest
- 1990–2007: NMJC
- 2008–2021: New Mexico

Head coaching record
- Overall: 467–413–4 (.531) (NCAA); 53–73 (.421) (NAIA); 765–255–2 (.750) (NJCAA)
- Tournaments: NCAA: 3–10

Accomplishments and honors

Championships
- NJCAA (2005); 2× NJCAA Region 5 (2005, 2007); 4× MW regular season (2012–2014, 2017); 3× MW tournament (2011, 2012, 2016)

Awards
- 7× WJCAC Coach of the Year (1995, 1997, 1998, 2002, 2005–2007); NJCAA Division I Coach of the Year (2005); 3× MW Coach of the Year (2012, 2013, 2017)

Raymond Joseph Birmingham Jr. (born November 14, 1955) is an American former college baseball coach. He was a baseball coach at the high school, junior college, and four-year college levels from 1978 to 1983 and 1988 to 2021, starting at Mayfield High School in Las Cruces, New Mexico from 1978 to 1983, then the College of the Southwest from 1988 to 1989, New Mexico Junior College from 1990 to 2007, and finally the New Mexico Lobos from 2008 to 2021. Upon retirement in 2021, Birmingham finished as the winningest baseball coach in New Mexico history and the winningest coach in Mountain West Conference history.

Birmingham has over 1,200 cumulative career wins as a head coach. He was the 2005 NJCAA Coach of the Year and is a member of the NJCAA Baseball Coaches Hall of Fame, NM Sports Hall of Fame, Lea County Hall of Fame, WJCAC Hall of Fame and the UNM Hall of Honor. Birmingham won 8 WJCAC coach of the year awards at NMJC. At the University of New Mexico, Birmingham was a three-time Mountain West Conference Coach of the Year and won seven Mountain West championships. Every program he coached was ranked in the top 25 teams in the country.

Birmingham was an assistant basketball coach at NMJC (1983–87) when the Thunderbirds won their first conference championship.

Birmingham was named National “Keeper of the Game” in 2020 as the baseball Coach/Player.

== Coaching career ==
=== College of the Southwest ===
Birmingham's college baseball coaching career began in the late 1980s, when he was the head coach at NAIA school College of the Southwest and its new baseball program from 1988 to 1989. There, he had a 53–73 overall record. In 1989, the Mustangs reached No. 23 in the NAIA national rankings, won 33 games and advanced to the regional finals before losing to Dallas Baptist.

=== New Mexico JC ===
Birmingham first worked at New Mexico Junior College (NMJC) from 1983 to 1987 as assistant basketball coach and public relations officer for the college.

From 1990 to 2007, Birmingham was the first head baseball coach at NMJC. He had an overall record of 765–255–2. The program reached two NJCAA World Series during his tenure, winning a national championship in 2005 and finishing second in 2007. He won several Coach of the Year awards: NJCAA Division I in 2005, NJCAA Division I Region 5 in 2005 and 2007, and WJCAC in 1995, 1997, 1998, 2002, 2005, 2006, 2007.

Birmingham led NMJC to 17 straight winning seasons, and the Thunderbirds were a gaudy 378–88–2 (.805) from 2000 to 2007. Under his leadership, NMJC had six players lead nationally in hitting and six teams that hit over .400, including the 2007 team that hit .416. The 2001 Thunderbirds hold the all-time NJCAA team batting avg. of .438. The 2005 NMJC national championship team hit .411 during the regular season and .400 in postseason play. In 1998, NMJC led the country in home runs with 122. In 2008, NMJC named its baseball field after Birmingham.

Several of Birmingham's later played in Major League Baseball, including Brendan Donnelly, Armando Almanza, Jose Flores, Mike Vento, and David Carpenter.

In 2011, Birmingham was elected to the NJCAA Baseball Coaches Hall of Fame.

=== New Mexico ===
Ahead of the 2008 season, Birmingham got his first Division I job when he replaced Rich Alday at New Mexico.

New Mexico had 30-win seasons in 2008 and 2009 and reached its first NCAA tournament under Birmingham in 2010, when the team went 38–22 and finished second in the Mountain West. The Lobos defeated Stanford in the opening game of the Fullerton Regional, then lost consecutive games to Minnesota and Cal State Fullerton. New Mexico returned to the NCAA tournament in 2011, 2012, 2013 and 2016, winning the MWC Tournament in 2011, 2012 and 2016. Birmingham's Lobos won 7 different championships in 14 years at UNM. Birmingham was named the Mountain West Coach of the Year three times (2012, 2013, 2017). During the 2013 season Birmingham earned the 1,000th win of his career when the Lobos defeated the Air Force Falcons 19–5.

Known as one of the top hitting coaches in the nation, Birmingham has led the Lobos to seven top-10 national finishes in batting average in 10 seasons at UNM, including an NCAA-best .334 in 2013 and .363 in 2009. He also coached Justin Howard to an NCAA-leading .456 average in 2010 and D.J. Peterson to a .520 on-base percentage in 2012. In 2013 in addition to leading the nation in batting, UNM also ranked first in scoring (8.3 runs per game), on-base percentage (.422), hits (724), slugging (.504) and doubles per game (2.53). In 2016 the Lobos finished 12th in the nation in hitting (.316) and led the country in doubles (150) while also finishing in the top 10 in slugging (.492 – fifth) and on-base percentage (.410 – sixth).

In the summer of 2014, Birmingham served as hitting coach for USA Baseball's Collegiate National Team.

Between 2008 and 2017, New Mexico has had 32 MLB draft selections, including future major leaguer Bobby LaFromboise in 2008 and MLB's Silver Slugger award-winning catcher Mitch Garver in 2013. The program's highest selection was D. J. Peterson, the 12th overall pick of the first round in 2013. In all, seven Lobos were chosen in the 2013 draft.

On April 18, 2021, Birmingham announced that he would retire after the season. He retired with a cumulative 432–341–8 record, the most wins in program history.

== Head coaching record ==
=== Junior college ===
Below is a table of Birmingham's head coaching record at the junior college level.

Record table
Season	Team	Overall	Conference	Standing	Postseason
NMJC Thunderbirds (Western Junior College Athletic Conference) (1990–2007)
1990	NMJC	22–30			
1991	NMJC	42–18			
1992	NMJC	40–15			
1993	NMJC	48–13			
1994	NMJC	42–12			
1995	NMJC	48–9			
1996	NMJC	34–17			
1997	NMJC	38–14			
1998	NMJC	40–18			
1999	NMJC	33–21			
2000	NMJC	41–14			
2001	NMJC	44–14			
2002	NMJC	43–10			
2003	NMJC	43–14			
2004	NMJC	47–10			
2005	NMJC	55–10			NJCAA World Series Champions
2006	NMJC	49–8–1			
2007	NMJC	56–8–1			NJCAA World Series
NMJC:		765–255–2 (.750)			
Total:		765–255–2 (.750)			
National champion Postseason invitational champion Conference regular season champion Conference regular season and conference tournament champion Division regular season champion Division regular season and conference tournament champion Conference tournament champion

=== College ===
Below is a table of Birmingham's head coaching record at the four-year college level.

Record table
Season	Team	Overall	Conference	Standing	Postseason
Southwest Mustangs (1988–1989)
1988	Southwest	20–40			
1989	Southwest	33–33			
Southwest:		53–73 (.421)			
New Mexico Lobos (Mountain West Conference) (2008–2021)
2008	New Mexico	34–25	16–8	T-2nd	
2009	New Mexico	37–20	15–8	2nd	
2010	New Mexico	38–22	14–8	2nd	NCAA Regional
2011	New Mexico	20–41	10–14	6th	NCAA Regional
2012	New Mexico	37–24	18–6	T–1st	NCAA Regional
2013	New Mexico	37–22	25–5	1st	NCAA Regional
2014	New Mexico	37–20–1	20–10	T–1st	
2015	New Mexico	32–27	17–13	4th	
2016	New Mexico	39–23	20–10	2nd	NCAA Regional
2017	New Mexico	30–27–1	19–9–1	1st	
2018	New Mexico	20–33–1	11–19	7th	
2019	New Mexico	23–28–1	11–16–1	7th	
2020	New Mexico	14–4	0–0		Season canceled due to COVID-19
2021	New Mexico	16–24	10–16	6th	
New Mexico:		414–340–4 (.549)	206–141–2 (.593)		
Total:		467–413–4 (.531)			
National champion Postseason invitational champion Conference regular season champion Conference regular season and conference tournament champion Division regular season champion Division regular season and conference tournament champion Conference tournament champion
