= New Mexico State Road 18 =

State highway in New Mexico, United States

State Road 18
- NM 18 highlighted in red

Route information
- Maintained by NMDOT
- Length: 72.117 mi (116.061 km)

Major junctions
- South end: SH 18 near Jal
- US 62 / US 180 in Hobbs
- North end: US 82 / NM 83 east in Lovington

Location
- Country: United States
- State: New Mexico
- Counties: Lea

Highway system
- New Mexico State Highway System; Interstate; US; State; Scenic
← NM 17	→ NM 19

State Road 18 (NM 18) is a state highway in the US state of New Mexico. Its total length is approximately 72.1 miles (116.0 km). NM 18's southern terminus is a continuation as Texas State Highway 18 (SH 18) south-southeast of Jal, and the northern terminus is at U.S. Route 82 and NM 83 in Lovington.

== Major intersections ==
The entire route is in Lea County.

Location	mi	km	Destinations	Notes
	0.000	0.000	SH 18 south – Kermit	Southern terminus
Jal	8.933	14.376	NM 128 – Carlsbad, Andrews	
	25.230	40.604	NM 207 north – Eunice	Southern terminus of NM 207
	31.662	50.955	NM 176 – Eunice, Andrews	
	37.600	60.511	NM 248 south – Eunice	Northern terminus of NM 248
Hobbs	49.725	80.025	US 62 / US 180 (E. Marland Boulevard)	
Hobbs	51.706	83.213	NM 132 north (Dal Paso Street) NM 218 east (E. Bender Boulevard) – Seminole	Southern terminus of NM 132; western terminus of NM 218
Hobbs	54.155	87.154	NM 208 south (West County Road) / W. Joe Harvey Boulevard	Northern terminus of NM 208
Lovington			NM 483 south (Brian Urlacher) to US 82 west	Northern terminus of NM 483
Lovington	72.117	116.061	US 82 / NM 83 east	Northern terminus; western terminus of NM 83
1.000 mi = 1.609 km; 1.000 km = 0.621 mi

== See also ==
- List of state roads in New Mexico
