= New Mexico State Road 83 =

State highway in New Mexico, United States

State Road 83

Route information
- Maintained by NMDOT
- Length: 19.911 mi (32.044 km)

Major junctions
- West end: US 82 / NM 18 in Lovington
- East end: NM 132 north of Hobbs

Location
- Country: United States
- State: New Mexico
- Counties: Lea

Highway system
- New Mexico State Highway System; Interstate; US; State; Scenic
← US 82	→ US 84

State Road 83 (NM 83) is a state highway in the US state of New Mexico. Its total length is approximately 19.9 miles (32.0 km). NM 83's western terminus is at U.S. Route 82 (US 82) / NM 18 in Lovington, and the eastern terminus is at NM 132 north of Hobbs.

== Major intersections ==
The entire route is in Lea County.

Location	mi	km	Destinations	Notes
Lovington	0.000	0.000	US 82 / NM 18 south	Western terminus, Northern terminus of NM 18
	19.911	32.044	NM 132	Eastern terminus
1.000 mi = 1.609 km; 1.000 km = 0.621 mi
