= New Mexico State Road 359 =

State highway in New Mexico, United States

State Road 359

Route information
- Maintained by NMDOT
- Length: 2.616 mi (4.210 km)

Major junctions
- East end: NM 28 (Avenida de Mesilla) in Mesilla
- West end: CR 41 / CR 352 in Mesilla

Location
- Country: United States
- State: New Mexico
- Counties: Doña Ana

Highway system
- New Mexico State Highway System; Interstate; US; State; Scenic
← NM 357	→ NM 360

State Road 359 (NM 359) is a 2.6-mile-long (4.2 km) state highway in the US state of New Mexico. NM 359's western terminus is at County Route 41 (CR 41) and CR 352 north of Tierra Amarilla, and the eastern terminus is at NM 28 (Avenida de Mesilla) in Mesilla.

== Major intersections ==
The entire route is in Mesilla, Doña Ana County.

mi	km	Destinations	Notes
0.000	0.000	NM 28 (Avenida de Mesilla)	Eastern terminus
1.045	1.682	NM 372 south (Snow Road)	Northern terminus of NM 372
2.616	4.210	CR 41 west (Mesilla Hills Drive)	Western terminus; eastern terminus of CR 41
2.616	4.210	CR 352 north (South Fairacres Road)	Continues as CR 352, southern terminus of CR 352
1.000 mi = 1.609 km; 1.000 km = 0.621 mi
