= New Mexico State Road 200 =

State highway in New Mexico, United States

State Road 200
- Carlsbad Relief Route
- NM 200 highlighted in red

Route information
- Maintained by NMDOT
- Length: 8.410 mi (13.535 km)

Major junctions
- West end: US 285 near Carlsbad
- East end: US 62 / US 180 near Carlsbad

Location
- Country: United States
- State: New Mexico
- Counties: Eddy

Highway system
- New Mexico State Highway System; Interstate; US; State; Scenic
← NM 199	→ NM 201

State Road 200 (NM 200) is a 8.410-mile-long (13.535 km) state highway in the US state of New Mexico. NM 200's western terminus is at U.S. Route 285 (US 285) northwest of Carlsbad, and the eastern terminus is at US 62 and US 180 east of Carlsbad.

== Major intersections ==
The entire route is in Eddy County.

Location	mi	km	Destinations	Notes
	0.000	0.000	US 285	Western terminus
	8.410	13.535	US 62 / US 180	Eastern terminus
1.000 mi = 1.609 km; 1.000 km = 0.621 mi
