= New Mexico State Road 372 =

State highway in Doña Ana County, New Mexico, United States

State Road 372
- Snow Road

Route information
- Maintained by NMDOT
- Length: 2.633 mi (4.237 km)

Major junctions
- South end: NM 374/Snow Road south of Mesilla
- NM 373 on border of Mesilla
- North end: NM 359 in Mesilla

Location
- Country: United States
- State: New Mexico
- Counties: Doña Ana

Highway system
- New Mexico State Highway System; Interstate; US; State; Scenic
← NM 371	→ NM 373

State Road 372 (NM 372), also known as Snow Road, is a 2.633-mile (4.237 km) state highway in Doña Ana, New Mexico, United States, that connects New Mexico State Road 374 (NM 374), south of Mesilla with NM 359 in Mesilla.

== Major intersections ==
The entire route is in Doña Ana County.

Location	mi	km	Destinations	Notes
	0.000	0.000	Snow Road south – NM 28, NM 478	Continuation south beyond southern terminus
	0.000	0.000	NM 374 west (Mesilla Dam Road)	Southern terminus; T intersection
Mesilla	1.533	2.467	NM 373 east (West Union Avenue) – NM 28	T intersection
Mesilla	2.633	4.237	NM 359 east (Calle Del Norte) – NM 28 NM 359 west (Calle Del Norte) – Rio Grande	Northern terminus
Mesilla	2.633	4.237	CR 223 north (Doña Ana County Road 223/Snow Road)	Continuation north beyond northern terminus
1.000 mi = 1.609 km; 1.000 km = 0.621 mi

== See also ==
- List of state roads in New Mexico
