= New Mexico State Road 243 =

State highway in New Mexico, United States

State Road 243

Route information
- Maintained by NMDOT
- Length: 8.206 mi (13.206 km)
- Existed: 1988–present

Major junctions
- West end: US 62 / US 180 near Carlsbad
- East end: US 62 / US 180 / NM 176 near Carlsbad

Location
- Country: United States
- State: New Mexico
- Counties: Eddy, Lea

Highway system
- New Mexico State Highway System; Interstate; US; State; Scenic
← NM 241	→ NM 244

State Road 243 (NM 243) is a 8.206-mile-long (13.206 km) state highway in the US state of New Mexico. NM 243's western terminus is at U.S. Route 62 (US 62) and US 180 northeast of Carlsbad, and the eastern terminus is at US 62 and US 180, which is also the western terminus of NM 176.

== Major intersections ==
County	Location	mi	km	Destinations	Notes
Eddy		0.000	0.000	US 62 / US 180	Western terminus
Lea		8.206	13.206	US 62 / US 180 / NM 176 east	Eastern terminus, western terminus of NM 176
1.000 mi = 1.609 km; 1.000 km = 0.621 mi
