= New Mexico State Road 355 =

State highway in New Mexico, United States

State Road 355
- NM 355 highlighted in red

Route information
- Maintained by NMDOT
- Length: 1.091 mi (1.756 km)

Major junctions
- South end: US 62 / US 180 near Carlsbad
- North end: End of state maintenance near Carlsbad

Location
- Country: United States
- State: New Mexico
- Counties: Eddy

Highway system
- New Mexico State Highway System; Interstate; US; State; Scenic
← NM 352	→ NM 356

State Road 355 (NM 355) is a 1.091-mile-long (1.756 km) state highway in the US state of New Mexico. NM 355's southern terminus is at U.S. Route 62 (US 62) and US 180 east-northeast of Carlsbad, and the northern terminus is at the end of state maintenance east-northeast of Carlsbad.

== Major intersections ==
The entire route is in Eddy County.

Location	mi	km	Destinations	Notes
	0.000	0.000	US 62 / US 180	Southern terminus
	1.091	1.756	End of state maintenance	Northern terminus
1.000 mi = 1.609 km; 1.000 km = 0.621 mi
