= New Mexico State Road 360 =

State highway in New Mexico, United States

State Road 360

Route information
- Maintained by NMDOT
- Length: 25.098 mi (40.391 km)

Major junctions
- Southern end: US 62 / US 180 near Carlsbad
- Northern end: US 82 near Artesia

Location
- Country: United States
- State: New Mexico
- Counties: Eddy

Highway system
- New Mexico State Highway System; Interstate; US; State; Scenic
← NM 359	→ NM 361

State Road 360 (NM 360) is a 25.098-mile-long (40.391 km) state highway in the US state of New Mexico. NM 360's southern terminus is at U.S. Route 62 (US 62) and US 180 northeast of Carlsbad, and the northern terminus is at US 82 east-southeast of Artesia.

== Major intersections ==
The entire route is in Eddy County.

Location	mi	km	Destinations	Notes
	0.000	0.000	US 62 / US 180	Southern terminus
	25.098	40.391	US 82	Northern terminus
1.000 mi = 1.609 km; 1.000 km = 0.621 mi
