= New Mexico State Road 374 =

State highway in New Mexico, United States

State Road 374
- Union Road
- NM 374 highlighted in red

Route information
- Maintained by NMDOT
- Length: 1.224 mi (1.970 km)

Major junctions
- West end: Mesilla Dam in Mesilla
- East end: NM 372 in Mesilla

Location
- Country: United States
- State: New Mexico
- Counties: Doña Ana

Highway system
- New Mexico State Highway System; Interstate; US; State; Scenic
← NM 373	→ NM 375

State Road 374 (NM 374) is a 1.224-mile-long (1.970 km) state highway in the US state of New Mexico. NM 374's eastern terminus is at NM 372 in Mesilla, and the western terminus is at Mesilla Dam.

== Major intersections ==
The entire route is in Mesilla, Doña Ana County.

mi	km	Destinations	Notes
0.000	0.000	NM 372	Eastern terminus
1.224	1.970	Mesilla Dam	Western terminus
1.000 mi = 1.609 km; 1.000 km = 0.621 mi
