= New Mexico Junior College =

Junior college in Lea County, New Mexico, U.S.

Coordinates: 32°45′28″N 103°10′58″W

- Type: Public junior college
- Established: 1965
- President: Cathy Mitchell
- Faculty: 80-100. including adjunct faculty
- Location: Hobbs, New Mexico, U.S.
- Campus: Rural, 243 acres (98 ha)
- Colors: Red and gold
- Nickname: Thunderbirds
- Website: www.nmjc.edu

New Mexico Junior College (NMJC) is a public junior college in unincorporated Lea County, New Mexico, near Hobbs.

== History and campus ==
New Mexico Junior College first opened in the fall of 1966, with a current enrollment of 3,375.

The campus is contained on 243 acres (98 ha) with over 331,400 gross square feet of building space, worth an estimated $37.3 million.

== Organization and administration ==
The college district within Lea County supports NMJC by a tax levy.

== Academics ==
New Mexico Junior College has an open admission policy. About 3,000 students attend NMJC, approximately 70% of whom are part-time students; overall, 47% of students are aged 25 or over. Approximately half of full-time students and about 34% of part-time students graduate. NMJC offers Associate of Arts, Associate of Science, and Associate of Applied Science degrees along with certificates. There are over 640 courses of study offered annually through NMJC's two instructional sectors: (a) Arts and Sciences and (b) Business and Technology. NMJC also offers certificate programs in many academic areas.

== Athletics ==
NMJC fields NJCAA Division I teams in men's baseball, men's and women's basketball, men's golf, women's track and field, women's cross country, and men's and women's rodeo. Its baseball team won the NJCAA World Series in 2005, its first championship. Their mascot is the Thunderbird. The men's and women's basketball games are broadcast locally on KNMJ 100.9 FM.

== Notable alumni ==
- Armando Almanza (born 1972), Major League Baseball (MLB) player
- Chris Boucher, NBA basketball player
- David Carpenter (born 1988), professional baseball player
- Charlie Criss (born 1948), professional basketball player
- Tharon Drake (born 1992), Paralympic swimmer
- Dekabriean Eldridge (born 1992), professional basketball player
- Brian Flores (born 1981), professional football coach
- Jose Flores (born 1971), MLB player
- Avery Johnson, professional basketball player and coach
- Jenifer Jones, nurse and member of the New Mexico House of Representatives
- Nick Pivetta (born 1993), MLB player
- Jason Siggers (born 1985), professional basketball player, 2016 Israeli National League MVP
- Robert Turner (born 1993), basketball player in the Israeli Basketball Premier League
- Mike Vento (born 1979), MLB player
