= Lea County–Zip Franklin Memorial Airport =

- IATA: none; ICAO: none; FAA LID: E06

Summary
- Airport type: Public
- Owner: Lea County
- Serves: Lovington, New Mexico
- Elevation AMSL: 3,979 ft / 1,213 m
- Coordinates: 32°57′14″N 103°24′32″W
- Website: www.LeaCounty.net/...

Map
- Location of airport in New Mexico

Runways
Direction	Length		Surface
Direction	ft	m	Surface
3/21	6,001	1,829	Asphalt
12/30	4,409	1,344	Asphalt

Statistics (2023)
- Aircraft operations (year ending 3/31/2023): 4,600
- Based aircraft: 12
- Source: Federal Aviation Administration

Lea County–Zip Franklin Memorial Airport (FAA LID: E06) is a county-owned, public-use airport in Lea County, New Mexico, United States. Located three nautical miles (6 km) west of the central business district of Lovington, New Mexico, it is also known as Lovington Airport. The airport is named for aviator Oliver Gene "Zip" Franklin. It is included in the National Plan of Integrated Airport Systems for 2011–2015, which categorized it as a general aviation facility.

== Facilities and aircraft ==
Lea County–Zip Franklin Memorial Airport covers an area of 400 acres (162 ha) at an elevation of 3,979 feet (1,213 m) above mean sea level. It has two runways with asphalt surfaces: 3/21 is 6,001 by 75 feet (1,829 x 23 m) and 12/30 is 4,409 by 60 feet (1,344 x 18 m).

For the 12-month period ending March 31, 2023, the airport had 4,600 aircraft operations, an average of 88 per week, 52% military and 48% general aviation. At that time there were 12 aircraft based at this airport: 10 single-engine, 1 multi-engine, and 1 glider.
