= New Mexico State Road 373 =

State highway in New Mexico, United States

State Road 373
- West Union Avenue

Route information
- Maintained by NMDOT
- Length: 1.496 mi (2.408 km)
- History: Truncated in 1992

Major junctions
- West end: NM 372 on border of Mesilla
- NM 28 on border of Mesilla
- East end: McDowell Road on border of Mesilla

Location
- Country: United States
- State: New Mexico
- Counties: Doña Ana

Highway system
- New Mexico State Highway System; Interstate; US; State; Scenic
← NM 372	→ NM 374

State Road 373 (NM 373), also known as West Union Avenue, is a 1.496-mile (2.408 km) state highway on the southern border of Mesilla in Doña Ana County, New Mexico, United States, that connects New Mexico State Road 372 (NM 372) with the southern end of McDowell Road.

== History ==
NM 373 was truncated to its current eastern terminus on November 2, 1992 in a road exchange agreement with the city of Mesilla.

== Major intersections ==
The entire route is in Mesilla, Doña Ana County.

mi	km	Destinations	Notes
0.000	0.000	NM 372	Western terminus; T intersection
1.026	1.651	NM 28 north (Avenida de Mesilla) – Las Cruces, I-10/US 180 NM 28 south (Lou Henson Highway) – San Miguel, La Union, Texas	
1.496	2.408	McDowell Road north – NM 101	Eastern terminus; T intersection
1.496	2.408	West Union Avenue east – NM 478	Continuation east beyond eastern terminus
1.000 mi = 1.609 km; 1.000 km = 0.621 mi

== See also ==
- List of state roads in New Mexico
