= New Mexico State Road 132 =

State highway in New Mexico, United States

State Road 132
- NM 132 highlighted in red

Route information
- Maintained by NMDOT
- Length: 19.760 mi (31.801 km)

Major junctions
- South end: NM 18 / NM 218 in Hobbs
- NM 83 near Knowles
- North end: SH 83 / FM 769 at the Texas/ New Mexico border

Location
- Country: United States
- State: New Mexico
- Counties: Lea

Highway system
- New Mexico State Highway System; Interstate; US; State; Scenic
← NM 131	→ NM 133

State Road 132 (NM 132) is a state highway in the US state of New Mexico. Its total length is approximately 19.76 miles (31.80 km). NM 132's southern terminus is at NM 18/NM 218 in Hobbs, and the northern terminus is at Texas State Highway 83 (SH 83) and Farm to Market Road 769 (FM 769) at the Texas–New Mexico state line.

== Major intersections ==
The entire route is in Lea County.

Location	mi	km	Destinations	Notes
Hobbs	0.000	0.000	NM 18 / NM 218 east	Southern terminus, western terminus of NM 218
	12.010	19.328	NM 133 east	Western terminus of NM 133
	15.030	24.188	NM 83 west	Eastern terminus of NM 83
	19.760	31.801	SH 83 / FM 769	Northern terminus at the Texas–New Mexico state line
1.000 mi = 1.609 km; 1.000 km = 0.621 mi
