= Denver City, Texas =

Denver City
- City
- Denver City, Texas
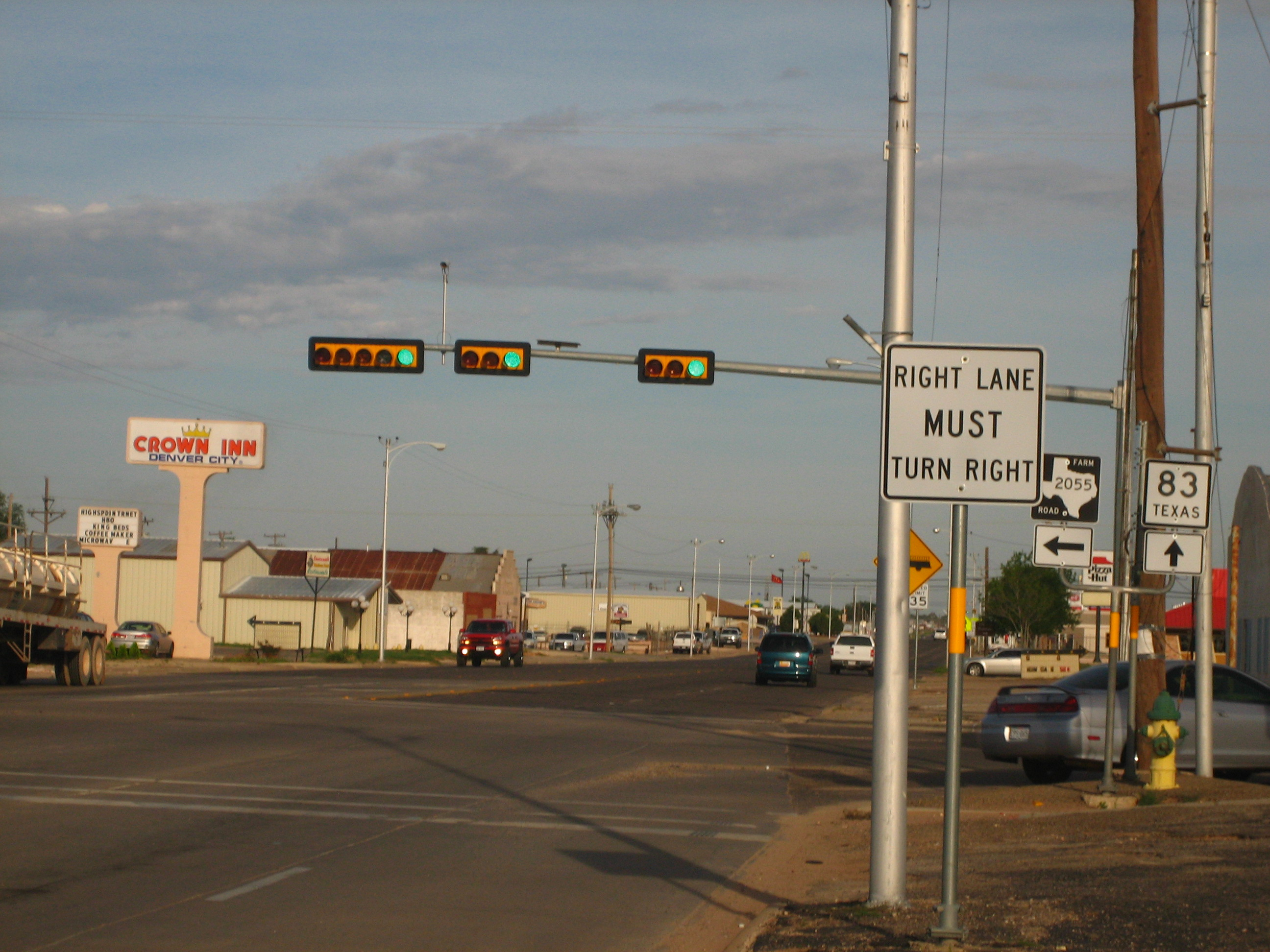
- Denver City, Texas
- Nickname: DC
- Motto: "A Forest of Steel Giants Against the Daylight Sky", Paul W. Scott
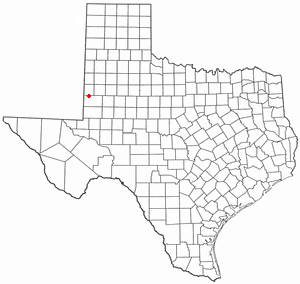
- Location of Denver City, Texas

- Coordinates: 32.9645°N 102.8291°W
- Country: United States
- State: Texas
- Counties: Yoakum, Gaines

Area
  - Total: 2.53 sq mi (6.56 km^{2})
  - Land: 2.53 sq mi (6.56 km^{2})
  - Water: 0 sq mi (0.00 km^{2})
- Elevation: 3,573 ft (1,089 m)

Population (2020)
  - Total: 4,470
  - Density: 1,760/sq mi (681/km^{2})
- Time zone: UTC-6 (Central (CST))
  - Summer (DST): UTC-5 (CDT)
- ZIP code: 79323
- Area code: 806
- FIPS code: 48-19984
- GNIS feature ID: 2412419
- Website: https://denvercitytexas.org/

Denver City is a city located in Yoakum County, with a tiny sliver within Gaines County, in the far western portion of the U.S. state of Texas, near the New Mexico boundary. It is named for the petroleum company Denver Productions. Its population was 4,470 at the 2020 census, down from 4,479 at the 2010 census. The city is located at the intersection of Texas State Highways 214 and 83.

== History ==
Denver City traces its origins to the development of the Wasson oil pool. Oil-leasing activities in the area trace back to 1927, gaining momentum with a significant strike in 1935. In 1939, C. S. Ameen and Ben Eggink founded the town, combining "Denver" from Denver Productions, where Ameen's friend worked, with "City" to express confidence in its future.

Incorporated on March 26, 1940, Denver City swiftly organized its governance with a mayor and city council. The city established the Denver City Volunteer Fire Department, ordering a fire truck, and formed utility services, such as a water company and gas company.

In 2008, the Denver City Independent School District presented a bond package for new and renovated facilities. Upgrades included a new high school, tennis courts, a junior-high band hall, an industrial-arts facility, a sports complex, a maintenance center, an athletics field house, and a bus barn. Renovations included classrooms, science laboratories, offices and foyer, a parking lot, a main field house, and a bus barn for the junior-high campus.

On May 11, 2013, voters in both Denver City and Yoakum County, as well as Crosby County, also in West Texas, all previously under local-option prohibition laws, approved the sale of liquor.

== Geography ==
According to the United States Census Bureau, Denver City has a total area of 2.5 square miles (6.5 km^{2}), all land.

=== Climate ===
Climate data for Denver City, Texas (1991–2020 normals, extremes 1986–present)
Month	Jan	Feb	Mar	Apr	May	Jun	Jul	Aug	Sep	Oct	Nov	Dec	Year
Record high °F (°C)	83 (28)	89 (32)	103 (39)	98 (37)	107 (42)	113 (45)	109 (43)	109 (43)	105 (41)	99 (37)	88 (31)	83 (28)	113 (45)
Mean maximum °F (°C)	75.9 (24.4)	79.7 (26.5)	86.2 (30.1)	91.0 (32.8)	97.0 (36.1)	102.4 (39.1)	100.5 (38.1)	99.6 (37.6)	96.5 (35.8)	91.9 (33.3)	81.6 (27.6)	74.4 (23.6)	104.3 (40.2)
Mean daily maximum °F (°C)	55.9 (13.3)	60.8 (16.0)	68.7 (20.4)	76.7 (24.8)	83.9 (28.8)	91.8 (33.2)	92.6 (33.7)	91.3 (32.9)	84.6 (29.2)	76.4 (24.7)	64.8 (18.2)	56.6 (13.7)	75.3 (24.1)
Daily mean °F (°C)	41.3 (5.2)	45.1 (7.3)	52.3 (11.3)	59.9 (15.5)	68.8 (20.4)	77.2 (25.1)	79.0 (26.1)	77.9 (25.5)	71.1 (21.7)	61.4 (16.3)	50.0 (10.0)	42.2 (5.7)	60.5 (15.8)
Mean daily minimum °F (°C)	26.8 (−2.9)	29.4 (−1.4)	36.0 (2.2)	43.2 (6.2)	53.8 (12.1)	62.6 (17.0)	65.4 (18.6)	64.5 (18.1)	57.6 (14.2)	46.5 (8.1)	35.2 (1.8)	27.8 (−2.3)	45.7 (7.6)
Mean minimum °F (°C)	15.5 (−9.2)	18.0 (−7.8)	22.4 (−5.3)	30.8 (−0.7)	40.7 (4.8)	54.6 (12.6)	60.5 (15.8)	59.3 (15.2)	47.2 (8.4)	32.3 (0.2)	21.0 (−6.1)	14.4 (−9.8)	10.6 (−11.9)
Record low °F (°C)	−2 (−19)	−2 (−19)	8 (−13)	20 (−7)	29 (−2)	46 (8)	55 (13)	52 (11)	37 (3)	15 (−9)	8 (−13)	1 (−17)	−2 (−19)
Average precipitation inches (mm)	0.68 (17)	0.77 (20)	1.10 (28)	1.21 (31)	2.01 (51)	2.27 (58)	2.45 (62)	2.44 (62)	2.74 (70)	1.63 (41)	1.00 (25)	0.75 (19)	19.05 (484)
Average snowfall inches (cm)	1.2 (3.0)	0.9 (2.3)	0.1 (0.25)	0.0 (0.0)	0.0 (0.0)	0.0 (0.0)	0.0 (0.0)	0.0 (0.0)	0.0 (0.0)	0.0 (0.0)	0.8 (2.0)	1.9 (4.8)	4.9 (12)
Average precipitation days (≥ 0.01 in)	3.1	3.5	4.0	2.7	5.0	5.3	4.9	5.1	5.4	4.9	3.6	3.6	51.1
Average snowy days (≥ 0.1 in)	0.8	0.7	0.1	0.0	0.0	0.0	0.0	0.0	0.0	0.0	0.4	1.1	3.1
Source: NOAA

== Demographics ==
Historical population
Census	Pop.	Note	%±
1950	1,858		—
1960	4,302		131.5%
1970	4,133		−3.9%
1980	4,704		13.8%
1990	5,145		9.4%
2000	3,985		−22.5%
2010	4,479		12.4%
2020	4,470		−0.2%
U.S. Decennial Census

=== 2020 census ===
As of the 2020 census, Denver City had a population of 4,470. The median age was 34.3 years; 28.6% of the residents were under 18 and 14.0% were 65 or older. For every 100 females, there were 97.3 males, and for every 100 females 18 and over, there were 94.1 males 18 and over.

None of the residents lived in urban areas, while 100.0% lived in rural areas.

Of the 1,531 households in Denver City, 42.7% had children under 18 living in them, 56.4% were married-couple households, 16.3% were households with a male householder and no spouse or partner present, and 22.5% were households with a female householder and no spouse or partner present. About 19.7% of all households were made up of individuals, and 9.6% had someone living alone who was 65 or older.

The city had 1,704 housing units, of which 10.2% were vacant. The homeowner vacancy rate was 1.1% and the rental vacancy rate was 15.7%. As of the 2020 census, 1,012 families were residing in the town.

Denver City racial composition
Race	Number	Percentage
White (non-Hispanic)	1,156	25.86%
Black or African American (non-Hispanic)	45	1.01%
Native American	12	0.27%
Asian	44	0.98%
Other/mixed	68	1.52%
Hispanic or Latino	3,145	70.36%

=== 2010 census ===
According to the census of 2010, 4,479 people, 1,770 households, and 1,578 families resided in the town. The racial makeup of the town was 63.3% Hispanic, 31.2% White, 1.3% African American, 1% Native American, 0.6% Asian, and 2.5% from two or more races.

== Notable people ==
- Chip Bennett, former NFL player with the Cincinnati Bengals
