= Allred, Texas =

Unincorporated community in Texas, US

Coordinates: 32°59′10″N 102°53′17″W

Allred is an unincorporated community in Yoakum County, in the U.S. state of Texas.

== History ==
Allred was laid out in 1938, and named for James V. Allred, 33rd Governor of Texas. A post office was established at Allred in 1938, and remained in operation until 1957.
