= Lea County Jal Airport =

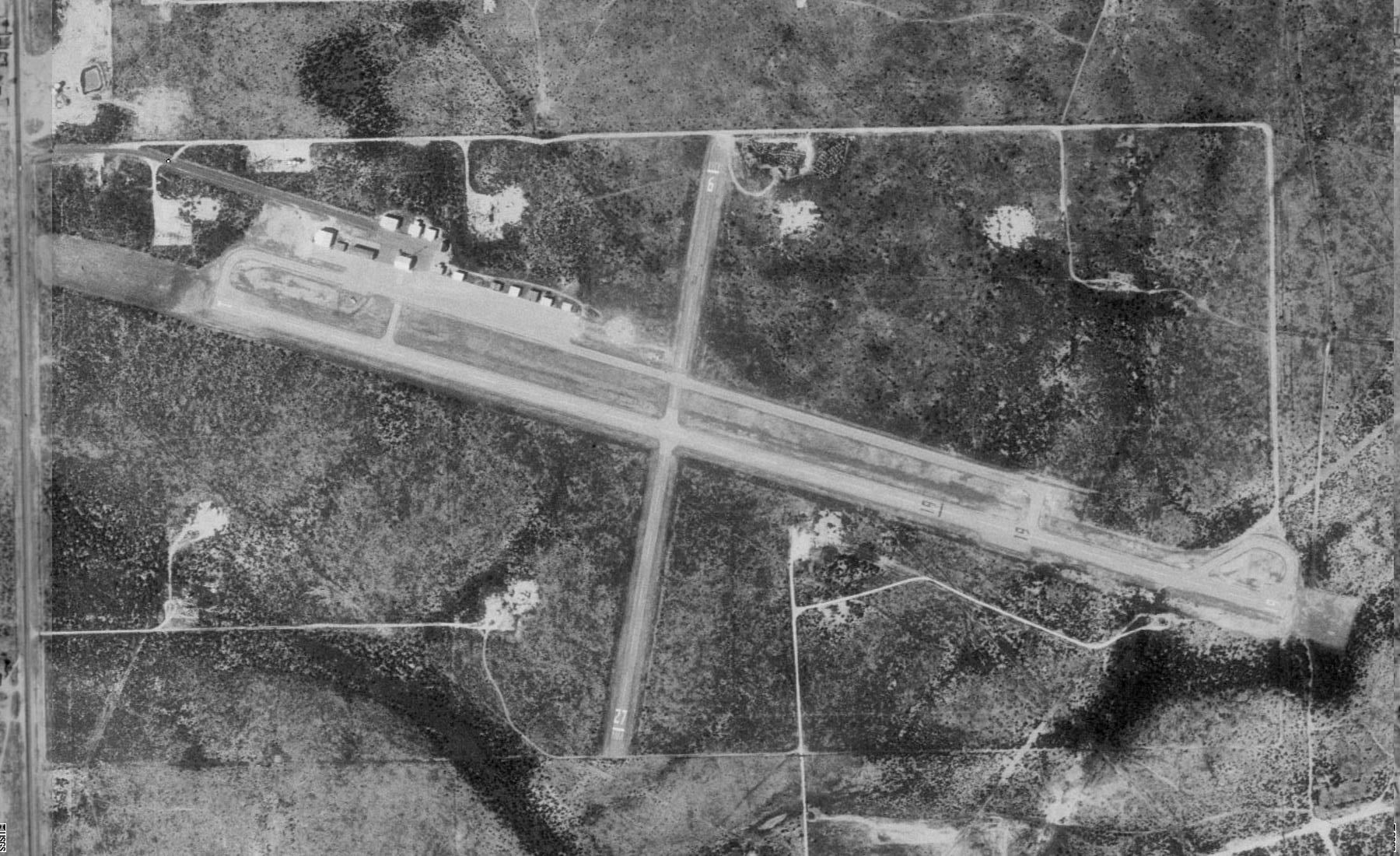
- USGS aerial image, 1997 (north is to the right)
- IATA: none; ICAO: none; FAA LID: E26

Summary
- Airport type: Public
- Owner: Lea County
- Serves: Jal, New Mexico
- Elevation AMSL: 3,118 ft / 950 m
- Coordinates: 32°07′52″N 103°09′17″W
- Website: leacounty.net/jalairport.htm
- Interactive map of Lea County Jal Airport

Runways
| Direction | Length | | Surface |
| Direction | ft | m | Surface |
|---|---|---|---|
| 1/19 | 4,704 | 1,434 | Asphalt |
| 9/27 | 2,604 | 794 | Asphalt |

Statistics (2023)
- Aircraft operations (year ending 3/31/2023): 3,000
- Based aircraft: 9
- Source: Federal Aviation Administration

Lea County Jal Airport (FAA LID: E26) is a county-owned public-use airport located three nautical miles (6 km) northeast of the central business district of Jal, a city in Lea County, New Mexico, United States.

This airport is included in the FAA's National Plan of Integrated Airport Systems (2009-2013), which categorizes it as a general aviation airport.

== Facilities and aircraft ==
Jal Airport covers an area of 320 acres (130 ha) at an elevation of 3,118 feet (950 m) above mean sea level. It has two asphalt paved runways: 1/19 is 4,704 by 60 feet (1,434 x 18 m) and 9/27 is 2,604 by 50 feet (794 x 15 m).

For the 12-month period ending March 31, 2023, the airport had 3,000 aircraft operations, an average of 57 per week. At that time, 9 aircraft were based here: 7 single-engine, 1 multi-engine, and 1 jet.
