= Lea County Courthouse =

- U.S. National Register of Historic Places
- NM State Register of Cultural Properties
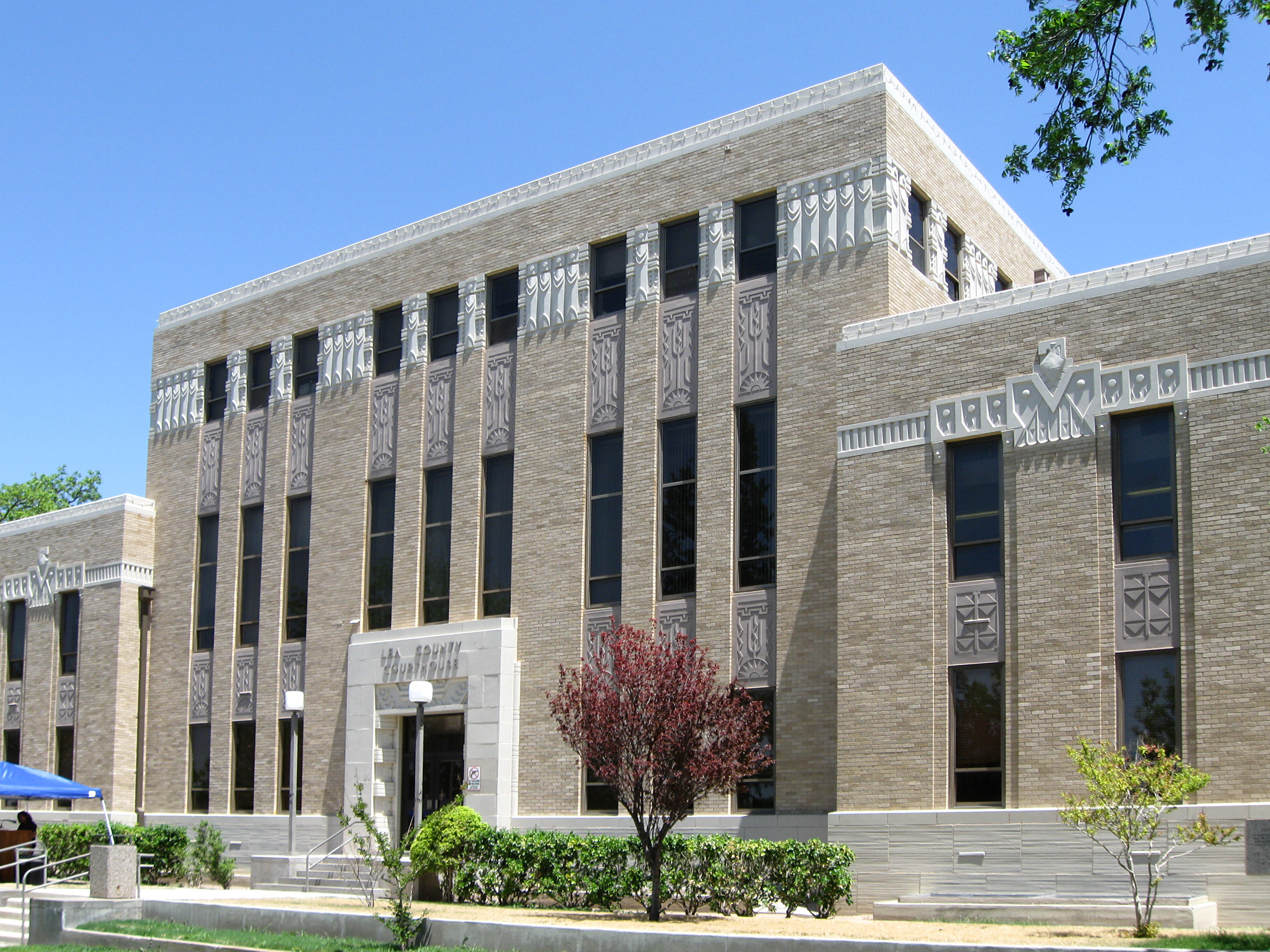

- Location within New Mexico Location within the United States
- Location: 100 North Main Avenue, Lovington, New Mexico
- Coordinates: 32°56′46″N 103°20′51″W
- Area: 3 acres (1.2 ha)
- Built: 1936
- Built by: W. S. Moss
- Architect: Orville R. Walker
- Architectural style: Art Deco
- MPS: County Courthouses of New Mexico TR
- NRHP reference No.: 87000880
- NMSRCP No.: 1275

Significant dates
- Added to NRHP: December 07, 1987
- Designated NMSRCP: May 9, 1986

The Lea County Courthouse is an historic Art deco courthouse building located at 100 North Main Avenue in Lovington, New Mexico. It was designed in 1936 by architect Orville R. Walker of Lubbock and built by W. S. Moss. Until December, 1984, its second and third floors housed the county jail.

On December 7, 1987, it was added to the National Register of Historic Places.

== See also ==
- National Register of Historic Places listings in Lea County, New Mexico
