= Tatum Municipal Schools =

School district in New Mexico, United States

Address
- 306 West 3rd St Tatum, NM, 88267; United States

District information
- Grades: PK–12
- Schools: 3
- NCES District ID: 3502550

Students and staff
- Students: 310
- Teachers: 28.93 (on an FTE basis)
- Student–teacher ratio: 10.72

Other information
- Website: www.tatumschools.org

Tatum Municipal Schools is a school district headquartered in Tatum, New Mexico, United States.

Most of the district is in Lea County (including Tatum), while a portion is in Chaves County.

== History ==
Circa 1943 an elementary school gymnasium was built.

In 1957 the district had a total of 650 students. That year a gymnasium was being built at the high school, with a total cost of $678,000.

In 1976 there was a bond election for $1,600,000 with about 50% voter turnout out of more than 600 possible voters; the voting books indicated 709, but some voters had moved away. The bond election succeeded, with 184 votes in favor and 132 votes opposing. Plans included building a new gymnasium for the elementary school, with a proposed cost of $386,000.

== Schools ==
- Tatum Elementary
- Tatum Jr High
- Tatum High
