= Jal, New Mexico =

- City
- Motto: "The Enchantment Starts Here!"
- Location of Jal, New Mexico

- Location in the United States
- Coordinates: 32°06′53″N 103°11′24″W
- Country: United States
- State: New Mexico
- County: Lea

Area
  - Total: 4.82 sq mi (12.49 km^{2})
  - Land: 4.82 sq mi (12.49 km^{2})
  - Water: 0 sq mi (0.00 km^{2})
- Elevation: 3,045 ft (928 m)

Population (2020)
  - Total: 2,202
  - Density: 456.6/sq mi (176.28/km^{2})
- Time zone: UTC-7 (Mountain (MST))
  - Summer (DST): UTC-6 (MDT)
- ZIP code: 88252
- Area code: 575
- FIPS code: 35-35040
- GNIS feature ID: 2410131
- Website: www.cityofjal.us

Jal (/dʒæl/) is a small city located in Lea County, New Mexico, United States. It is New Mexico's south-easternmost city, and shares a border with Texas to the east and south. The population was estimated to be 2,069 in 2023. Jal is historically important in the natural gas industry, from the early 1900s to the present day.

== Geography ==
According to the United States Census Bureau, the city has a total area of 4.8 square miles (12 km^{2}), all land.

== Demographics ==
Historical population
Census	Pop.	Note	%±
1930	404		—
1940	1,157		186.4%
1950	2,047		76.9%
1960	3,051		49.0%
1970	2,602		−14.7%
1980	2,675		2.8%
1990	2,156		−19.4%
2000	1,996		−7.4%
2010	2,047		2.6%
2020	2,202		7.6%
U.S. Decennial Census

=== 2020 census ===
As of the 2020 census, Jal had a population of 2,202. The median age was 35.0 years. 27.9% of residents were under the age of 18 and 15.2% of residents were 65 years of age or older. For every 100 females there were 107.3 males, and for every 100 females age 18 and over there were 106.8 males age 18 and over.

0.0% of residents lived in urban areas, while 100.0% lived in rural areas.

There were 821 households in Jal, of which 34.7% had children under the age of 18 living in them. Of all households, 47.5% were married-couple households, 25.2% were households with a male householder and no spouse or partner present, and 23.0% were households with a female householder and no spouse or partner present. About 27.4% of all households were made up of individuals and 11.5% had someone living alone who was 65 years of age or older.

There were 1,037 housing units, of which 20.8% were vacant. The homeowner vacancy rate was 1.4% and the rental vacancy rate was 20.1%.

Racial composition as of the 2020 census
Race	Number	Percent
White	1,005	45.6%
Black or African American	13	0.6%
American Indian and Alaska Native	15	0.7%
Asian	0	0.0%
Native Hawaiian and Other Pacific Islander	0	0.0%
Some other race	475	21.6%
Two or more races	694	31.5%
Hispanic or Latino (of any race)	1,393	63.3%

=== 2010 census ===
As of the census of 2010, there were 2,047 people, with 788 occupied houses. The population density was 426.5 inhabitants per square mile (164.7/km^{2}). There were 1009 housing units at an average density of 210.2 per square mile (81.2/km^{2}). The racial makeup of the city was 84.81% White, 0.83% African American, 0.73% Native American, 11.82% from other races, and 1.66% from two or more races. Hispanic or Latino of any race were 48.12% of the population.

There were 788 households, out of which 34.1% had children under the age of 18 living with them, 56.5% were married couples living together, 11.4% had a female householder with no husband present, and 25.5% were non-families. 23.2% of all households were made up of individuals, and 9.5% had someone living alone who was 65 years of age or older. The average household size was 2.60 and the average family size was 3.04.

In the city, the population was spread out, with 29.5% under the age of 19, 12.2% in their 20s, 10.1% in their 30s, 12.6% in their 40s, 13.2% in their 50s, and 22.4% who were 60 years of age or older. The median age was 38.2 years. For every 100 females, there were 99.5 males. For every 100 females age 18 and over, there were 97.1 males.

=== Income and poverty ===
The median income for a household in the city was $39,813, and the median income for a family was $51,538. Males had a median income of $46,250 versus $30,147 for females. The per capita income for the city was $20,597. About 12.0% of families and 14.4% of the population were below the poverty line, including 23.6% of those under age 18 and 18.5% of those age 65 or over.

== History ==
During the early 1900s, the Cowden boys of Midland, Texas moved the entire John A. Lynch herd to the Monument draw, about 6 miles northeast of present-day Jal. All the cattle were branded with the JAL brand from shoulder to hip. In the process of trying to rebrand the Cowdens, they found it too big a task so they registered the brand under their name in Silver City, New Mexico Territory.

In 1913, Charles Justis (a merchant) applied for a post office under the name "Jal" to open six miles east of the city of Jal. However, in 1916, Jal became drought-stricken and the store and post office were relocated to Muleshoe Wells and the city of Jal was established in its present location.

On November 1, 1927, Texas Co. brought in the first well, the Rhodes #1. Then on June 2, 1928, a second well, serving up more than 90 million cubic feet of gas a day, was brought online 6 miles west of Jal. This created a “boom town,” with all the prosperity and problems that go with it. The Great Depression and low crude prices caused a sharp slump in drilling and people left in droves. Jal almost became a ghost town overnight.

In the summer of 1934, the Cooper #1 brought the “Big Boom” back to Jal. By then Jal had a passenger train and its population rose to around 500. Housing was in short supply and ranchers opened their homes to “roughnecks”. New businesses sprang up, and with the gas gathering system by El Paso Natural Gas, prosperity continued.

== Government ==
In 1950, a city hall was built. In 1966, it received a renovation, and in 1987, it received another one. By 2019, the municipal authorities considered the 1950 building out of date, so that year they authorized a renovation of the 37,900-square-foot (3,520 m^{2}) former Burke Junior High School, with city hall in a 14,300-square-foot (1,330 m^{2}) eastern portion. This was under construction in 2021.

== Education ==
It is a part of Jal Public Schools.

== Infrastructure ==
=== Highways ===
- NM 18 runs north & south
- NM 128 runs east & west
- NM 205 runs southwest to Bennett

=== Railroad ===
The Texas & New Mexico Railway provides freight service.

=== Airport ===
The city is served by the Lea County/Jal Airport about three miles to the northeast. The airport has a paved, 4700 ft. runway. Jal once saw commuter airline service in 1964 by Solar Airlines.

== Climate ==
Jal experiences a cool semi-arid climate, typical of the high plains of eastern New Mexico. However, it borders a hot semi-arid climate.

Climate data for Jal, New Mexico.
Month	Jan	Feb	Mar	Apr	May	Jun	Jul	Aug	Sep	Oct	Nov	Dec	Year
Record high °F (°C)	85 (29)	89 (32)	98 (37)	102 (39)	107 (42)	114 (46)	112 (44)	110 (43)	108 (42)	100 (38)	89 (32)	84 (29)	114 (46)
Mean daily maximum °F (°C)	59.9 (15.5)	65.2 (18.4)	72.9 (22.7)	81.8 (27.7)	89.0 (31.7)	95.6 (35.3)	96.3 (35.7)	95.0 (35.0)	88.8 (31.6)	80.3 (26.8)	68.6 (20.3)	61.0 (16.1)	79.5 (26.4)
Mean daily minimum °F (°C)	27.9 (−2.3)	32.4 (0.2)	38.8 (3.8)	47.6 (8.7)	56.8 (13.8)	65.3 (18.5)	68.0 (20.0)	66.8 (19.3)	60.2 (15.7)	48.9 (9.4)	36.7 (2.6)	29.2 (−1.6)	48.2 (9.0)
Record low °F (°C)	−11 (−24)	−8 (−22)	10 (−12)	20 (−7)	28 (−2)	40 (4)	50 (10)	50 (10)	37 (3)	20 (−7)	8 (−13)	0 (−18)	−11 (−24)
Average precipitation inches (mm)	0.41 (10)	0.48 (12)	0.42 (11)	0.63 (16)	1.42 (36)	1.28 (33)	1.82 (46)	1.79 (45)	2.08 (53)	1.31 (33)	0.47 (12)	0.46 (12)	12.58 (320)
Average snowfall inches (cm)	1.3 (3.3)	0.7 (1.8)	0.3 (0.76)	0 (0)	0 (0)	0 (0)	0 (0)	0 (0)	0 (0)	0 (0)	0.6 (1.5)	0.8 (2.0)	3.5 (8.9)
Source: The Western Regional Climate Center

== Notable people ==
- Charles T. Sinclair, robber and murderer
- Kathy Whitworth, winner of 88 LPGA Tour events, more than anyone else; 1965 and 1966 female athlete of the year
