= Lea County, New Mexico =

County in New Mexico, United States

- County
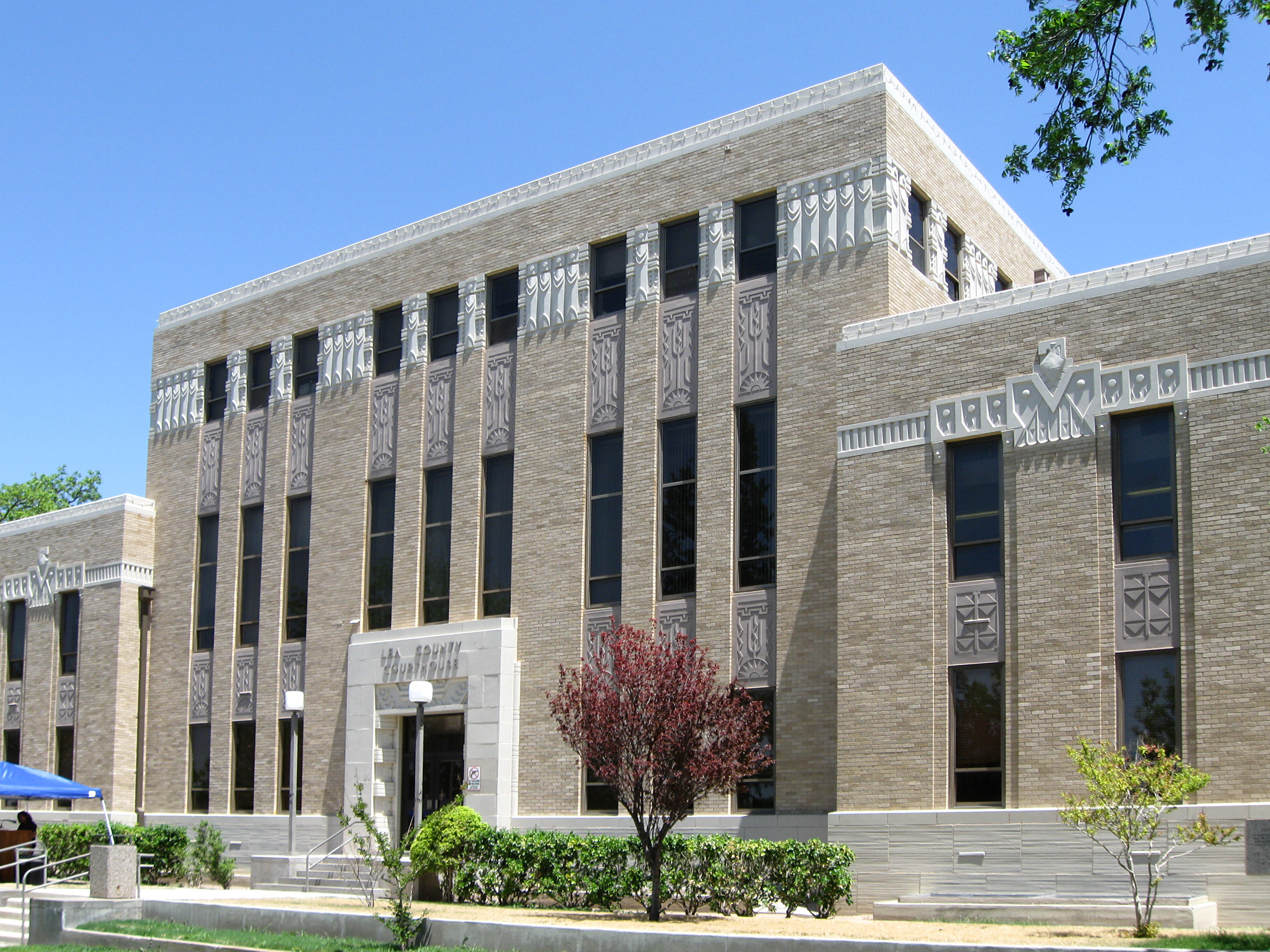
- Lea County Courthouse in Lovington

- Flag

- Location within the U.S. state of New Mexico
- Coordinates: 32°48′N 103°25′W
- Country: United States
- State: New Mexico
- Founded: March 17, 1917
- Seat: Lovington
- Largest city: Hobbs

Area
  - Total: 4,394 sq mi (11,380 km^{2})
  - Land: 4,391 sq mi (11,370 km^{2})
  - Water: 3.3 sq mi (8.5 km^{2}) 0.07%

Population (2020)
  - Total: 74,455
  - Estimate (2025): 74,749 ▲
  - Density: 16.96/sq mi (6.547/km^{2})
- Time zone: UTC−7 (Mountain)
  - Summer (DST): UTC−6 (MDT)
- Congressional district: 2nd
- Website: www.leacounty.gov

Lea County (/liː/, LEE) is a county located in the U.S. state of New Mexico. As of the 2020 census, its population was 74,455.

Its county seat is Lovington. It is both west and north of the Texas state line. Lea County comprises the Hobbs, NM micropolitan statistical area.

== Geography ==
According to the U.S. Census Bureau, the county has a total area of 4,394 square miles (11,380 km^{2}), of which 4,391 sq mi (11,370 km^{2}) are land and 3.3 sq mi (8.5 km^{2}) (0.07%) are covered by water. Lea County is located in the southeast corner of New Mexico and borders Texas to the south and east.

The Permian Basin, 250 mi (400 km) wide and 350 mi (560 km) long, underlies Lea County and adjacent Eddy County, as well as a large portion of West Texas. It produces 500,000 barrels of crude a day, and this number was expected to double in 2019. The shale in this basin lies 3,000–15,000 ft (910–4,570 m) below the surface, below a salt bed and a groundwater aquifer.

=== Adjacent counties ===
- Roosevelt County – north
- Chaves County – northwest
- Eddy County – west
- Loving County, Texas – south
- Winkler County, Texas – southeast
- Andrews County, Texas – east
- Gaines County, Texas – east
- Yoakum County, Texas – east
- Cochran County, Texas – northeast

== Demographics ==
=== 2020 census ===
As of the 2020 census, the county had a population of 74,455. The median age was 32.3 years. 29.2% of residents were under the age of 18 and 11.1% of residents were 65 years of age or older. For every 100 females there were 106.4 males, and for every 100 females age 18 and over there were 107.6 males.

Lea County, New Mexico – Racial and ethnic composition Note: the US Census treats Hispanic/Latino as an ethnic category. This table excludes Latinos from the racial categories and assigns them to a separate category. Hispanics/Latinos may be of any race.
Race / Ethnicity (NH = Non-Hispanic)	Pop 2000	Pop 2010	Pop 2020	% 2000	% 2010	% 2020
White alone (NH)	29,977	27,845	23,775	54.00%	43.02%	31.93%
Black or African American alone (NH)	2,340	2,399	2,497	4.22%	3.71%	3.35%
Native American or Alaska Native alone (NH)	356	468	477	0.64%	0.72%	0.64%
Asian alone (NH)	198	302	636	0.36%	0.47%	0.85%
Pacific Islander alone (NH)	11	18	21	0.02%	0.03%	0.03%
Other race alone (NH)	34	51	294	0.06%	0.08%	0.39%
Mixed race or Multiracial (NH)	585	581	1,562	1.05%	0.90%	2.10%
Hispanic or Latino (any race)	22,010	33,063	45,193	39.65%	51.08%	60.70%
Total	55,511	64,727	74,455	100.00%	100.00%	100.00%

The racial makeup of the county was 46.1% White, 3.8% Black or African American, 1.3% American Indian and Alaska Native, 0.9% Asian, 0.0% Native Hawaiian and Pacific Islander, 27.1% from some other race, and 20.9% from two or more races. Hispanic or Latino residents of any race comprised 60.7% of the population.

75.1% of residents lived in urban areas, while 24.9% lived in rural areas.

There were 25,049 households in the county, of which 41.6% had children under the age of 18 living with them and 22.8% had a female householder with no spouse or partner present. About 22.9% of all households were made up of individuals and 8.1% had someone living alone who was 65 years of age or older.

There were 27,950 housing units, of which 10.4% were vacant. Among occupied housing units, 66.6% were owner-occupied and 33.4% were renter-occupied. The homeowner vacancy rate was 1.1% and the rental vacancy rate was 13.2%.

=== 2010 census ===
Historical population
Census	Pop.	Note	%±
1920	3,545		—
1930	6,144		73.3%
1940	21,154		244.3%
1950	30,717		45.2%
1960	53,429		73.9%
1970	49,554		−7.3%
1980	55,993		13.0%
1990	55,765		−0.4%
2000	55,511		−0.5%
2010	64,727		16.6%
2020	74,455		15.0%
2025 (est.)	74,749	▲	0.4%
U.S. Decennial Census; 1790-1960 1900-1990; 1990-2000 2010

As of the 2010 census, 64,727 people, 22,236 households, and 16,260 families were living in the county.

The population density was 14.7 inhabitants per square mile (5.7/km^{2}). The 24,919 housing units averaged 5.7/sq mi (2.2/km^{2}). The racial makeup of the county was 75.0% White, 4.1% African American, 1.2% Native American, 0.5% Asian, 0.1% Pacific Islander, 16.6% from other races, and 2.6% from two or more races. Those of Hispanic or Latino origin made up 51.1% of the population. In terms of ancestry, 9.3% were German, 7.6% were Irish, 7.2% were English, and 6.3% were American.

Of the 22,236 households, 41.9% had children under the age of 18 living with them, 52.8% were married couples living together, 13.4% had a female householder with no husband present, 26.9% were not families, and 22.6% of all households were made up of individuals. The average household size was 2.82 and the average family size was 3.30. The median age was 31.9 years.

The median income for a household in the county was $43,910 and for a family was $48,980. Males had a median income of $44,714 versus $25,847 for females. The per capita income for the county was $19,637. About 15.2% of families and 17.7% of the population were below the poverty line, including 23.5% of those under age 18 and 11.1% of those age 65 or over.

=== 2000 census ===
As of the 2000 census, 55,511 people, 19,699 households, and 14,715 families were living in the county. The population density was 13 people per square mile (5.0 people/km^{2}). The 23,405 housing units averaged 5 units per square mile (1.9/km^{2}). The racial makeup of the county was 67.13% White, 4.37% African American, 0.99% Native American, 0.39% Asian, 23.85% from other races, and 3.27% from two or more races. About 39.65% of the population were Hispanic or Latino of any race.

Of the 19,699 households, 39.30% had children under the age of 18 living with them, 57.80% were married couples living together, 12.20% had a female householder with no husband present, and 25.30% were not families. About 22.50% of all households were made up of individuals, and 9.90% had someone living alone who was 65 years of age or older. The average household size was 2.73, and the average family size was 3.20.

In the county, the age distribution was 30.10% under 18, 10.10% from 18 to 24, 27.30% from 25 to 44, 20.30% from 45 to 64, and 12.20% who were 65 years older. The median age was 33 years. For every 100 females there were 100.30 males. For every 100 females age 18 and over, there were 99.00 males.

The median income for a household in the county was $29,799, and for a family was $34,665. Males had a median income of $32,005 versus $20,922 for females. The per capita income for the county was $14,184. About 17.30% of families and 21.10% of the population were below the poverty line, including 28.00% of those under age 18 and 14.90% of those age 65 or over.

== Transportation ==
=== Airports ===
These public-use airports are located in the county:

- Lea County Regional Airport (HOB) – Hobbs
- Lea County-Jal Airport (E26) – Jal
- Lea County-Zip Franklin Memorial Airport (E06) – Lovington
- Tatum Airport (18T) – Tatum

=== Major highways ===
- US 62 / US 180
- US 82
- US 380
- NM 8
- NM 18
- NM 83
- NM 125
- NM 128
- NM 132
- NM 133
- NM 175
- NM 176
- NM 205
- NM 206
- NM 207
- NM 208
- NM 218
- NM 243
- NM 248
- NM 249
- NM 322
- NM 457
- NM 483
- NM 508
- NM 529

== Politics ==
United States presidential election results for Lea County, New Mexico
Year	Republican		Democratic		Third party(ies)	
Year	No.	%	No.	%	No.	%
1920	255	25.22%	733	72.50%	23	2.27%
1924	138	18.75%	552	75.00%	46	6.25%
1928	537	52.96%	474	46.75%	3	0.30%
1932	271	9.83%	2,371	86.03%	114	4.14%
1936	549	12.22%	3,905	86.95%	37	0.82%
1940	1,286	23.00%	4,295	76.81%	11	0.20%
1944	1,227	29.44%	2,938	70.49%	3	0.07%
1948	1,273	21.13%	4,708	78.14%	44	0.73%
1952	4,738	47.52%	5,204	52.19%	29	0.29%
1956	5,661	47.66%	6,140	51.69%	78	0.66%
1960	7,548	48.78%	7,806	50.45%	120	0.78%
1964	7,033	44.10%	8,862	55.57%	53	0.33%
1968	7,415	48.21%	4,751	30.89%	3,216	20.91%
1972	12,478	76.41%	3,429	21.00%	424	2.60%
1976	8,773	56.82%	6,533	42.31%	135	0.87%
1980	10,727	66.28%	5,006	30.93%	452	2.79%
1984	14,569	75.26%	4,558	23.55%	230	1.19%
1988	11,309	65.36%	5,879	33.98%	115	0.66%
1992	7,921	48.56%	5,047	30.94%	3,343	20.50%
1996	7,661	52.24%	5,393	36.77%	1,612	10.99%
2000	10,157	71.25%	3,855	27.04%	244	1.71%
2004	14,430	79.37%	3,646	20.05%	105	0.58%
2008	13,347	71.58%	5,108	27.40%	190	1.02%
2012	12,548	73.75%	4,080	23.98%	387	2.27%
2016	12,495	70.55%	3,930	22.19%	1,287	7.27%
2020	16,531	79.03%	4,061	19.41%	326	1.56%
2024	16,997	80.14%	3,930	18.53%	282	1.33%

Lea County, like most of the High Plains, eastern New Mexico and west-central Texas, is heavily Republican. It has repeatedly claimed the status of the most Republican county in New Mexico in Presidential elections. In the 2004 Presidential election, Lea County was the top New Mexico county, as far as percentage, for Republican George W. Bush. He beat John Kerry 79%-20%. In 2008, the Republican candidate John McCain beat Democratic candidate Barack Obama by a wide but slightly smaller margin, 72% to 27%. In 2024, Donald Trump won over 80% of the county's vote, while Kamala Harris only received 18.5%, the worst showing for a Democrat in the county's history. It was Trump's strongest county in New Mexico in the 2024 election. No Democrat has received more than 30% of the county's vote since Bill Clinton in 1996.

However, Lea County was a Democratic stronghold prior to 1968, voting Republican only once in Herbert Hoover's 1928 landslide.

In March 2026, the Republican House Speaker of Texas, Dustin Burrows, filed interim charges to create a Texas state committee to study the legal and economic implications of a legal Texan annexation of Lea County and neighboring Roosevelt County. This followed an effort by two Republicans in the New Mexico Legislature to create a state amendment that would allow New Mexico's counties to vote on legal secession from the state. There is some support for this within the counties; such an annexation would transfer the Republican-majority counties from a Democratic-leaning state to a Republican-leaning one.

== Communities ==
=== Cities ===
- Eunice
- Hobbs
- Jal
- Lovington (County Seat)

=== Town ===
- Tatum

=== Census-designated places ===
- Monument
- Nadine
- North Hobbs

=== Other unincorporated communities ===
- Bennett
- Caprock
- Crossroads
- Knowles
- Maljamar
- McDonald

== Education ==
School districts include:

- Eunice Municipal Schools
- Hobbs Municipal Schools
- Jal Public Schools
- Lovington Public Schools
- Tatum Municipal Schools

== Notable people ==
- Roy Cooper. Rodeo cowboy
- Kathy Whitworth, professional golfer
- Brian Urlacher, Chicago Bears football linebacker (2000–2012)

== See also ==
- National Register of Historic Places listings in Lea County, New Mexico
