= Lovington, New Mexico =

- City
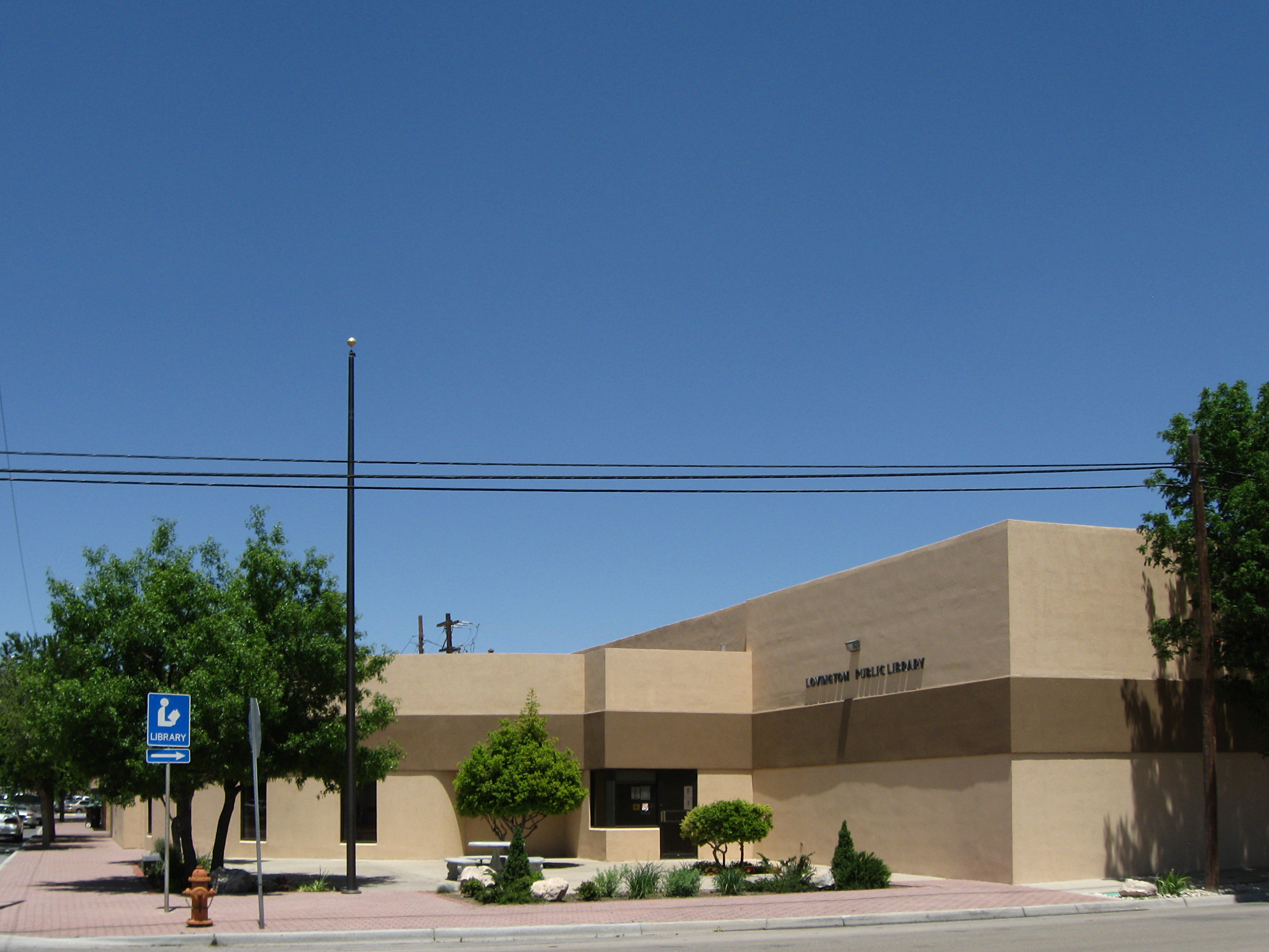
- Lovington Public Library

- Location of Lovington, New Mexico

- Location within the United States
- Coordinates: 32°57′06″N 103°20′59″W
- Country: United States
- State: New Mexico
- County: Lea

Area
  - Total: 11.24 sq mi (29.10 km^{2})
  - Land: 11.21 sq mi (29.03 km^{2})
  - Water: 0.027 sq mi (0.07 km^{2})
- Elevation: 3,918 ft (1,194 m)

Population (2020)
  - Total: 11,668
  - Density: 1,041/sq mi (401.9/km^{2})
- Time zone: UTC−7 (Mountain (MST))
  - Summer (DST): UTC−6 (MDT)
- ZIP code: 88260
- Area code: 575
- FIPS code: 35-44490
- GNIS feature ID: 2410888
- Website: lovington.org

Lovington is a city in and the county seat of Lea County, New Mexico, United States. As of the 2020 census, Lovington had a population of 11,668.

== Geography ==
Lovington is located slightly north of the center of Lea County.

According to the United States Census Bureau, Lovington has a total area of 11.4 square miles (29.5 km^{2}), of which 0.03 square miles (0.08 km^{2}), or 0.26%, are water.

== Demographics ==
Historical population
Census	Pop.	Note	%±
1920	411		—
1930	961		133.8%
1940	1,916		99.4%
1950	3,134		63.6%
1960	9,660		208.2%
1970	8,915		−7.7%
1980	9,727		9.1%
1990	9,322		−4.2%
2000	9,471		1.6%
2010	11,009		16.2%
2020	11,668		6.0%
U.S. Decennial Census

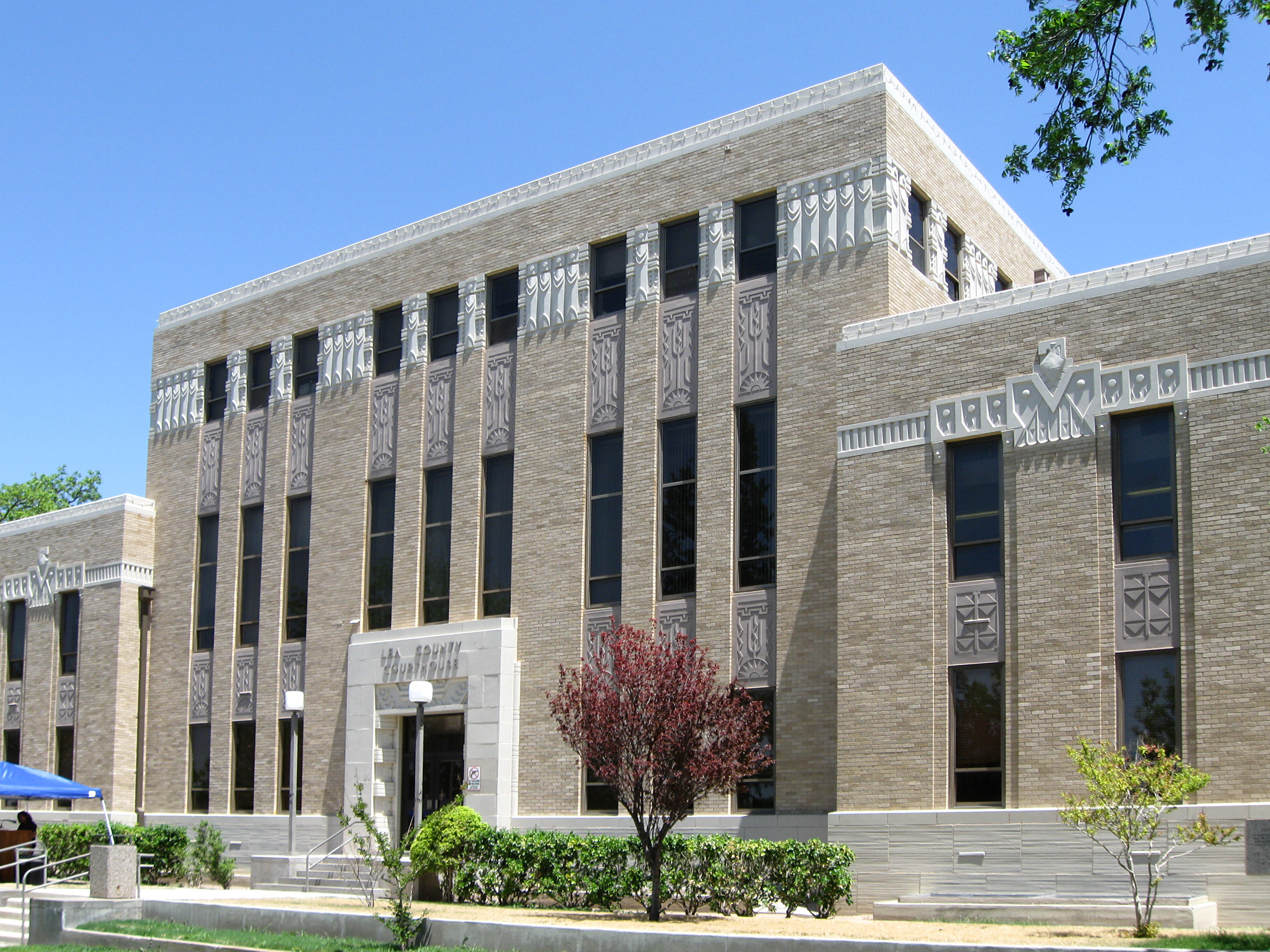
Lea County Courthouse

=== 2020 census ===
As of the 2020 census, Lovington had a population of 11,668. The median age was 31.9 years. 30.9% of residents were under the age of 18 and 11.0% of residents were 65 years of age or older. For every 100 females there were 103.2 males, and for every 100 females age 18 and over there were 100.8 males age 18 and over.

99.3% of residents lived in urban areas, while 0.7% lived in rural areas.

There were 3,813 households in Lovington, of which 44.8% had children under the age of 18 living in them. Of all households, 51.4% were married-couple households, 17.6% were households with a male householder and no spouse or partner present, and 24.1% were households with a female householder and no spouse or partner present. About 21.4% of all households were made up of individuals and 8.2% had someone living alone who was 65 years of age or older.

There were 4,224 housing units, of which 9.7% were vacant. The homeowner vacancy rate was 1.1% and the rental vacancy rate was 11.7%.

Racial composition as of the 2020 census
Race	Number	Percent
White	4,591	39.3%
Black or African American	237	2.0%
American Indian and Alaska Native	140	1.2%
Asian	91	0.8%
Native Hawaiian and Other Pacific Islander	2	0.0%
Some other race	4,205	36.0%
Two or more races	2,402	20.6%
Hispanic or Latino (of any race)	8,554	73.3%

=== 2000 census ===
As of the 2000 census, there were 9,471 people, 3,297 households, and 2,459 families living in the city. The population density was 1,983.6 inhabitants per square mile (765.9/km^{2}). There were 3,823 housing units at an average density of 800.7 per square mile (309.2/km^{2}). The racial makeup of the city was 59.85% White, 3.03% African American, 0.78% Native American, 0.48% Asian, 0.06% Pacific Islander, 32.74% from other races, and 3.06% from two or more races. Hispanic or Latino of any race were 52.12%.

Of the 3,297 households 41.6% had children under the age of 18 living with them, 57.0% were married couples living together, 13.0% had a female householder with no husband present, and 25.4% were non-families. 22.8% of households were one person and 11.5% were one person aged 65 or older. The average household size was 2.80 and the average family size was 3.29.

The age distribution was 31.8% under the age of 18, 10.9% from 18 to 24, 25.8% from 25 to 44, 18.8% from 45 to 64, and 12.6% 65 or older. The median age was 31 years. For every 100 females, there were 96.8 males. For every 100 females age 18 and over, there were 94.3 males.

The median household income was $26,458 and the median family income was $30,064. Males had a median income of $28,547 versus $19,826 for females. The per capita income for the city was $12,752. About 20.1% of families and 22.1% of the population were below the poverty line, including 28.1% of those under age 18 and 16.2% of those age 65 or over.

== Infrastructure ==
=== Transportation ===
==== Highways ====
- US 82 passes through the center of town, leading west 64 miles (103 km) to Artesia and northeast 35 miles (56 km) to Plains, Texas.
- New Mexico State Road 18 leads southeast from Lovington 21 miles (34 km) to Hobbs, the largest city in Lea County.
- State Road 83 leads east 18 miles (29 km) to the Texas border, where Texas State Highway 83 continues east 14 miles (23 km) to Denver City, Texas.

==== Railroad ====
The Texas & New Mexico Railway provides freight service. Lovington is the northern terminus of this line.

== Education ==
Lovington Municipal Schools is the area school district. It operates Lovington High School.

== Notable people ==
- Ray Berry, professional football player (NFL)
- Ronnie Black, professional golfer
- Taymon Domzalski, professional and Duke University basketball star
- Paul L. Foster, billionaire and President of Western Refining
- Shirley Hooper, 18th Secretary of State of New Mexico
- Sean Murphy, professional golfer
- Earlene Roberts (1935–2013), politician
- Ralph Tasker, basketball coach
- Titanic Thompson, gambler, raconteur
- Brian Urlacher, professional football player (NFL)
