= Hobbs, New Mexico =

- City
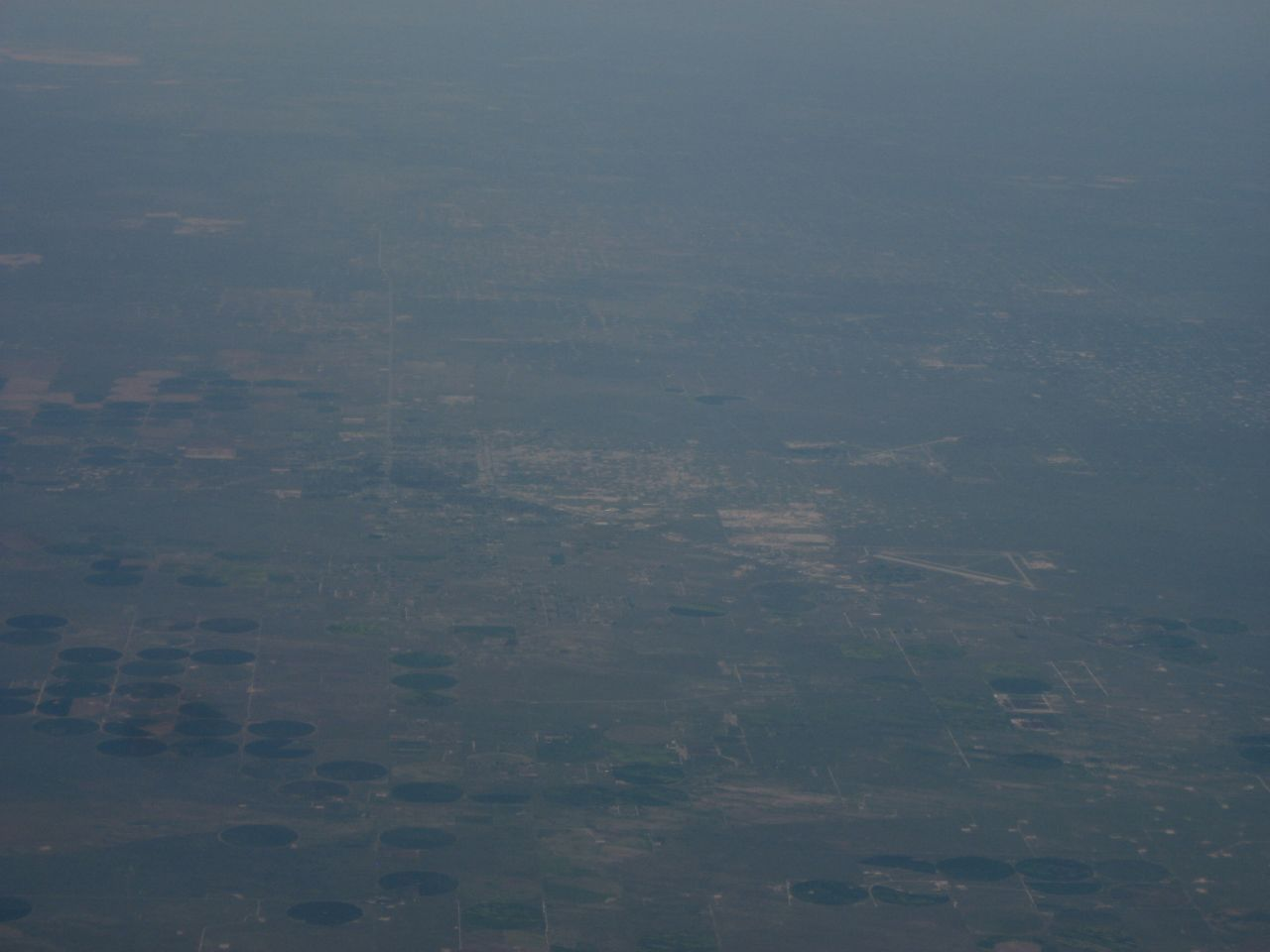
- View of Hobbs
- Motto: "It All Happens Here"
- Location of Lea County and the state of New Mexico

- Location in the United States
- Coordinates: 32°43′41″N 103°09′36″W
- Country: United States
- State: New Mexico
- County: Lea

Government
  - Mayor: Jonathan Sena
  - City Manager: Manny Gomez

Area
  - Total: 26.44 sq mi (68.47 km^{2})
  - Land: 26.41 sq mi (68.39 km^{2})
  - Water: 0.035 sq mi (0.09 km^{2})
- Elevation: 3,642 ft (1,110 m)

Population (2020)
  - Total: 40,508
  - Density: 1,534.2/sq mi (592.35/km^{2})
- Time zone: UTC-07:00 (MST)
  - Summer (DST): UTC-06:00 (MDT)
- ZIP codes: 88240-88242
- Area code: 575
- FIPS code: 35-32520
- GNIS feature ID: 2410771
- Website: www.hobbsnm.gov

Hobbs is a city in Lea County, New Mexico, United States. Its population was 40,508 at the 2020 census, increasing from 34,122 in 2010. It is the state's seventh-most populous city.

Hobbs is the principal city of the Hobbs, New Mexico micropolitan statistical area, which includes all of Lea County.

== History ==
Hobbs was founded in 1907 when James Isaac Hobbs established a homestead and named the settlement. In 1910, the Hobbs post office opened, with James Hobbs as the first postmaster. By 1911, about 25 landowners lived in Hobbs.

The small, isolated settlement expanded rapidly following the discovery of oil by the Midwest Oil Company in 1927. A refinery was built the following year, and in 1929, the town of Hobbs was officially incorporated. At the peak of this oil boom, over 12,000 people lived in Hobbs. When the Great Depression hit, oil prices dropped and the population fell to only about 3,000 in 1931. A few years later, though, activity picked up in the oilfields and the population climbed to about 14,000 in 1940.

On June 23, 1938, seven local men were killed and five more injured when an explosive charge used in oil drilling detonated prematurely.

Following the outbreak of World War II, Hobbs Army Airfield was built north of town in 1942. In 1948, the city bought the air base and converted it into the Hobbs Industrial Air Park, which is still used for soaring competitions.

The first college in Hobbs opened in 1956. It was initially the First Baptist College, and in 1962, it became the College of the Southwest. The name was changed again to University of the Southwest in 2008. A second college, New Mexico Junior College, opened in 1966.

An ordinance was passed in Hobbs in November 2022 to prevent abortion clinics from operating. This ordinance was overwritten by a 2023 state law prohibiting local abortion bans.

== Geography ==
Hobbs is in eastern Lea County, less than 4 mi (6 km) west of the Texas border. U.S. Routes 62/180 pass through the city, leading east 29 mi (47 km) to Seminole, Texas, and west 69 mi (111 km) to Carlsbad. State Road 18 also passes through Hobbs, leading northwest 21 mi (34 km) to Lovington, the Lea county seat, and south 61 mi (98 km) to Kermit, Texas.

According to the United States Census Bureau, the city of Hobbs has a total area of 26.4 square miles (68.5 km^{2}), of which 0.04 square miles (0.1 km^{2}), or 0.14%, is covered by water. Land in the city drains either east to Seminole Draw or southeast to Monument Draw, both of which are tributaries of Mustang Draw in Texas and ultimately part of the Colorado River watershed.

== Climate ==
Hobbs, like many parts of Eastern New Mexico, has a semiarid climate (Köppen climate classification BSk). The city experiences hot summers and chilly winters. With around 70% of precipitation coming in the high solar half of the year, Hobbs may also be defined as a dry-winter humid subtropical climate (Köppen climate classification Cwa).

Climate data for Hobbs, New Mexico, 1991–2020 normals, extremes 1913–2022
Month	Jan	Feb	Mar	Apr	May	Jun	Jul	Aug	Sep	Oct	Nov	Dec	Year
Record high °F (°C)	83 (28)	87 (31)	95 (35)	98 (37)	107 (42)	114 (46)	110 (43)	108 (42)	109 (43)	98 (37)	89 (32)	84 (29)	114 (46)
Mean maximum °F (°C)	73.1 (22.8)	77.5 (25.3)	84.4 (29.1)	90.7 (32.6)	97.9 (36.6)	104.1 (40.1)	102.6 (39.2)	100.9 (38.3)	97.2 (36.2)	90.6 (32.6)	79.7 (26.5)	71.8 (22.1)	105.7 (40.9)
Mean daily maximum °F (°C)	55.1 (12.8)	60.7 (15.9)	68.5 (20.3)	77.1 (25.1)	85.3 (29.6)	93.4 (34.1)	94.1 (34.5)	92.0 (33.3)	84.6 (29.2)	76.0 (24.4)	63.6 (17.6)	55.7 (13.2)	75.5 (24.2)
Daily mean °F (°C)	42.3 (5.7)	46.8 (8.2)	54.0 (12.2)	62.3 (16.8)	71.3 (21.8)	79.2 (26.2)	81.4 (27.4)	79.9 (26.6)	72.7 (22.6)	62.9 (17.2)	50.9 (10.5)	43.1 (6.2)	62.2 (16.8)
Mean daily minimum °F (°C)	29.6 (−1.3)	33.0 (0.6)	39.5 (4.2)	47.5 (8.6)	57.3 (14.1)	65.1 (18.4)	68.7 (20.4)	67.7 (19.8)	60.7 (15.9)	49.7 (9.8)	38.1 (3.4)	30.5 (−0.8)	48.9 (9.4)
Mean minimum °F (°C)	16.7 (−8.5)	18.7 (−7.4)	23.8 (−4.6)	32.5 (0.3)	42.7 (5.9)	56.1 (13.4)	61.3 (16.3)	60.8 (16.0)	48.4 (9.1)	34.1 (1.2)	22.8 (−5.1)	16.4 (−8.7)	12.2 (−11.0)
Record low °F (°C)	−7 (−22)	−2 (−19)	1 (−17)	17 (−8)	27 (−3)	37 (3)	47 (8)	45 (7)	35 (2)	12 (−11)	4 (−16)	−1 (−18)	−7 (−22)
Average precipitation inches (mm)	0.50 (13)	0.53 (13)	0.63 (16)	0.76 (19)	1.91 (49)	1.27 (32)	1.74 (44)	2.06 (52)	2.46 (62)	0.87 (22)	0.53 (13)	0.51 (13)	13.77 (348)
Average snowfall inches (cm)	0.9 (2.3)	0.2 (0.51)	0.0 (0.0)	0.1 (0.25)	0.0 (0.0)	0.0 (0.0)	0.0 (0.0)	0.0 (0.0)	0.0 (0.0)	0.1 (0.25)	0.0 (0.0)	0.5 (1.3)	1.8 (4.61)
Average precipitation days (≥ 0.01 in)	2.5	1.6	1.7	2.0	3.5	4.3	4.1	5.2	5.5	3.0	2.0	1.8	37.2
Average snowy days (≥ 0.1 in)	0.4	0.2	0.0	0.0	0.0	0.0	0.0	0.0	0.0	0.0	0.0	0.3	0.9
Source 1: NOAA
Source 2: National Weather Service

== Demographics ==
Historical population
Census	Pop.	Note	%±
1930	598		—
1940	10,619		1,675.8%
1950	13,875		30.7%
1960	26,275		89.4%
1970	26,025		−1.0%
1980	29,153		12.0%
1990	29,115		−0.1%
2000	28,657		−1.6%
2010	34,122		19.1%
2020	40,508		18.7%
U.S. Decennial Census

=== 2020 census ===
As of the 2020 census, 40,508 people, 13,573 households, and 8,572 families resided in the city. The median age was 31.1 years. 29.4% of residents were under the age of 18 and 10.1% of residents were 65 years of age or older. For every 100 females there were 107.2 males, and for every 100 females age 18 and over there were 110.4 males age 18 and over.

96.3% of residents lived in urban areas, while 3.7% lived in rural areas.

There were 13,573 households in Hobbs, of which 42.1% had children under the age of 18 living in them. Of all households, 44.9% were married-couple households, 21.3% were households with a male householder and no spouse or partner present, and 25.2% were households with a female householder and no spouse or partner present. About 24.0% of all households were made up of individuals and 8.0% had someone living alone who was 65 years of age or older.

There were 15,070 housing units, of which 9.9% were vacant. The homeowner vacancy rate was 1.2% and the rental vacancy rate was 13.2%.

Racial composition as of the 2020 census
Race	Number	Percent
White	17,147	42.3%
Black or African American	2,288	5.6%
American Indian and Alaska Native	577	1.4%
Asian	502	1.2%
Native Hawaiian and Other Pacific Islander	18	0.0%
Some other race	10,744	26.5%
Two or more races	9,232	22.8%
Hispanic or Latino (of any race)	25,076	61.9%

=== 2010 census ===
As of 2010, 33,405 people, 10,040 households, and 7,369 families were residing in the city. The population density was 1,514.0 inhabitants per square mile (584.6/km^{2}). The 11,968 housing units averaged 632.3 units per square mile (244.1 units/km^{2}). The racial makeup of the city was 63.5% White, 6.8% African American, 1.1% Native American, 0.4% Asian, 24.5% from other races, and 3.7% from two or more races. Hispanics or Latinos of any race were 42.18% of the population.

Of the 10,040 households, 39.8% had children under 18 living with them, 54.1% were married couples living together, 14.6% had a female householder with no husband present, and 26.6% were not families. About 23.4% of all households were made up of individuals, and 10.1% had someone living alone who was 65 or older. The average household size was 2.72, and the average family size was 3.22.

In the city, the age distribution was 30.4% under 18, 10.3% from 18 to 24, 28.0% from 25 to 44, 19.4% from 45 to 64, and 11.9% who were 65 or older. The median age was 32 years. For every 100 females, there were 100.2 males. For every 100 females age 18 and over, there were 99.2 males.

The median income for a household in the city was $28,100, and for a family was $33,017. Males had a median income of $31,352 versus $20,841 for females. The per capita income for the city was $14,209. About 20.2% of families and 24.2% of the population were below the poverty line, including 32.3% of those under age 18 and 15.5% of those age 65 or over.

== Economy ==
The largest industries in Hobbs are mining/quarrying and oil and gas extraction, followed by retail trade and educational services. Nearby Eunice, NM hosts a uranium enrichment facility operated by Urenco USA which provides technician and nuclear engineering jobs across the region, including Hobbs. Hobbs is also home to Zia Park, a racetrack, hotel and casino with over 750 slot machines and table games.

== Arts and culture ==
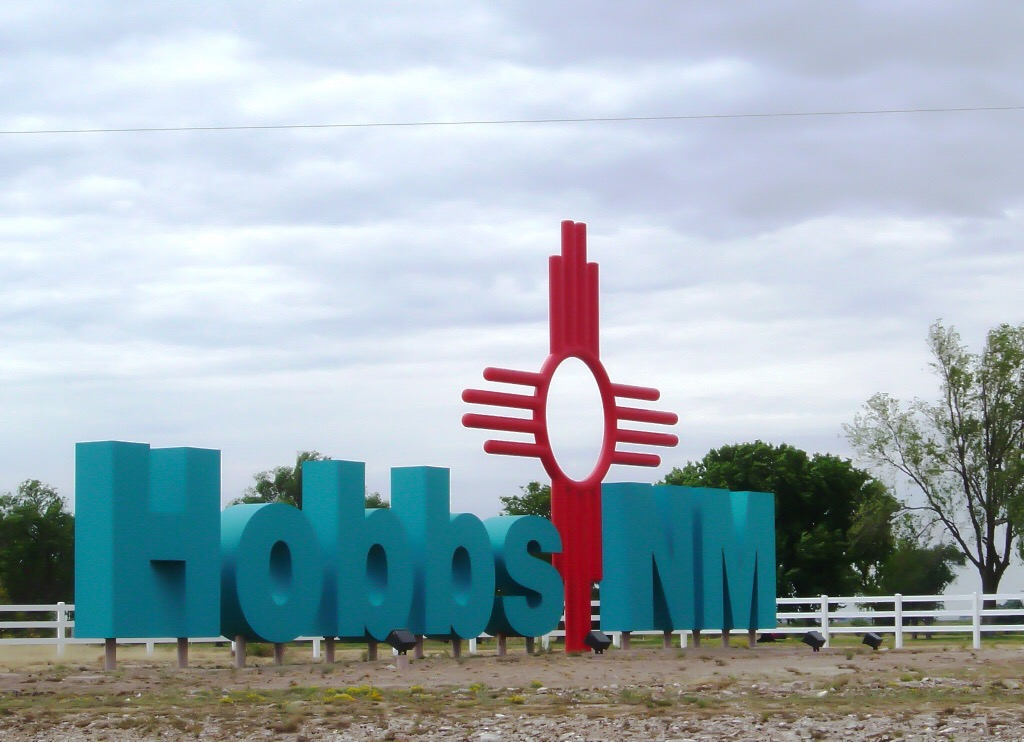
Sign in Hobbs

Located in Hobbs are the headquarters of the Soaring Society of America and Zia Park Casino, Hotel, and Racetrack, which offers live and simulcast racing, casino games, dining, and a 154-room hotel. The property is owned and operated by Penn National Gaming, Inc.

== Transportation ==
=== Highways ===
- US 62 runs east & west
- NM 18 runs north & south
- NM 132 runs north

=== Railroad ===
The Texas & New Mexico Railway provides freight service.

=== Airport ===
Lea County Regional Airport serves Hobbs with one commercial passenger airline flying to it.

== Education ==
Hobbs Municipal Schools is the local school district, which includes Hobbs High School.

For higher education in the area, University of the Southwest is a private, four-year Christian university, and New Mexico Junior College is a public junior college.

== Notable people ==
- Tony Benford, college basketball coach
- Ryan Bingham, country singer/songwriter
- Ray Birmingham, college baseball coach
- Bill Bridges, professional basketball player
- James O. Browning, federal judge
- Roy Cooper, rodeo cowboy
- Diane Denish, former Lieutenant Governor of New Mexico
- Tharon Drake, swimmer, U.S. Paralympic medalist 2016
- Rob Evans, college basketball coach (University of Mississippi and Arizona State University)
- Colt McCoy, professional football player; NFL quarterback
- Steve Pearce, former Republican congressman for New Mexico's 2nd congressional district
- Guy Penrod, gospel singer
- Timmy Smith, professional football player (NFL)
- Ralph Tasker, coach of twelve New Mexico Boys' State Basketball Championships for Hobbs High School, West Virginia Sports Hall of Fame
- Jeff Taylor, professional basketball player (father of Jeffery Taylor)
- Jeffery Taylor, professional basketball player (son of Jeff Taylor)
- Harry Teague, Congressman for New Mexico's 2nd congressional district
- Scott Terry, professional baseball player (MLB's Cincinnati Reds)
- Polo Urias, singer

== See also ==
- Hobbs, Texas
- Eastern New Mexico
