= New Mexico State Road 248 =

State highway in New Mexico, United States

State Road 248
- NM 248 highlighted in red

Route information
- Maintained by NMDOT
- Length: 6.674 mi (10.741 km)
- Existed: May 25, 2006–present

Major junctions
- South end: NM 176 in Eunice
- North end: NM 18 near Eunice

Location
- Country: United States
- State: New Mexico
- Counties: Lea

Highway system
- New Mexico State Highway System; Interstate; US; State; Scenic
← NM 247	→ NM 249

State Road 248 (NM 248) is a 6.674-mile-long (10.741 km) state highway in the US state of New Mexico. NM 248's southern terminus is at NM 176 in Eunice, and the northern terminus is at NM 18 north of Eunice.

== History ==
NM 248 was formerly the northern portion of NM 207. NM 248 was designated on May 25, 2006. NM 248 was formerly applied to Ruins Road in Aztec.

== Major intersections ==
The entire route is in Lea County.

Location	mi	km	Destinations	Notes
Eunice	0.000	0.000	NM 176	Southern terminus
	6.674	10.741	NM 18	Northern terminus
1.000 mi = 1.609 km; 1.000 km = 0.621 mi
