= Florey, Texas =

- Unincorporated community
- Location within Texas Location within the United States
- Coordinates: 32°27′10″N 102°35′24″W
- Country: United States
- State: Texas
- County: Andrews
- Elevation: 3,179 ft (969 m)
- Time zone: UTC-6 (Central (CST))
  - Summer (DST): UTC-5 (CDT)
- Area code: 432
- GNIS feature ID: 1378304

Florey is an unincorporated community in Andrews County, in the U.S. state of Texas. According to the Handbook of Texas, the community had a population of 25 in 2000. It is located within the Andrews, Texas micropolitan area.

== Geography ==
Florey stands along U.S. Highway 385, 12 mi (19 km) north of Andrews in the northwestern portion of Andrews County.

== Education ==
Florey's first school was established in 1909 and it was absorbed into the Andrews Independent School District on December 15, 1938. The community is still currently served by the Andrews ISD to this day since the whole county is one whole school district.
