= Texas's 19th congressional district =

U.S. House district for Texas

Coordinates: 33°14′43″N 101°12′35″W

- Interactive map of district boundaries since January 3, 2023 (Note: The district went unchanged at the 2025 Texas redistricting and thus will retain the same boundaries at the 2026 elections.)
- Representative: Jodey Arrington; R–Lubbock
- Distribution: 74.25% urban; 25.75% rural
- Population (2025): 791,423
- Median household income: $70,354
- Ethnicity: 50.2% White; 38.3% Hispanic; 6.3% Black; 2.7% Two or more races; 1.8% Asian; 0.7% other
- Cook PVI: R+25

Texas's 19th congressional district of the United States House of Representatives includes the upper midwestern portion of the state of Texas. The district includes portions of the State from Lubbock to Abilene. The current Representative from the 19th district is Republican Jodey Arrington. With a Cook Partisan Voting Index rating of R+25, it is one of the most Republican districts in Texas.

== History ==
The border runs along the western boundary with New Mexico, and runs along county borders to include far reaching cities. The area is predominantly rural, with the exceptions of Abilene and Lubbock, and includes many state parks, ranches, and farms.

This is one of the most conservative districts in Texas and the nation. It has not supported a Democratic presidential candidate since 1964. Republicans have held the seat since 1985. In the last four decades, a Democrat has only won 40 percent of the vote in this district twice, in 1984 and 2004.

Much of this region continued to elect conservative Democrats to local offices and the Texas Legislature well into the 1990s. Since the mid-1990s, however, Republicans have dominated every level of government, winning by 70 percent or more of the vote. By the turn of the millennium, there were virtually no elected Democrats left other than at the county level.

In 2004, the district voted 77% for George W. Bush, who ran for this seat in 1978, and 71% for John McCain in 2008.

== Recent election results from statewide races ==
| Year | Office | Results |
|---|---|---|
| 2008 | President | McCain 71% - 28% |
| 2012 | President | Romney 75% - 25% |
| 2014 | Senate | Cornyn 84% - 16% |
| 2014 | Governor | Abbott 82% - 18% |
| 2016 | President | Trump 72% - 23% |
| 2018 | Senate | Cruz 71% - 28% |
| 2018 | Governor | Abbott 74% - 24% |
| 2018 | Lt. Governor | Patrick 68% - 29% |
| 2018 | Attorney General | Paxton 70% - 27% |
| 2018 | Comptroller of Public Accounts | Hegar 73% - 24% |
| 2020 | President | Trump 72% - 26% |
| 2020 | Senate | Cornyn 73% - 24% |
| 2022 | Governor | Abbott 77% - 22% |
| 2022 | Lt. Governor | Patrick 75% - 22% |
| 2022 | Attorney General | Paxton 75% - 23% |
| 2022 | Comptroller of Public Accounts | Hegar 77% - 21% |
| 2024 | President | Trump 75% - 24% |
| 2024 | Senate | Cruz 73% - 25% |
| 2026 | Senate | Paxton 63% - 33% |
| 2026 | Governor | Abbott 66% - 32% |

== Composition ==
For the 118th and successive Congresses (based on redistricting following the 2020 census), the district contains all or portions of the following counties and communities:

Andrews County (2)

Andrews, McKinney Acres

Bailey County (1)

Muleshoe

Borden County (1)

Gail

Callahan County (1)

Clyde (part; also 25th)

Castro County (6)

All 6 communities

Cochran County (3)

All 3 communities

Crosby County (3)

All 3 communities

Dawson County (5)

All 5 communities

Fisher County (5)

All 5 communities

Floyd County (2)

Floydada, Lockney

Gaines County (4)

All 4 communities

Garza County (1)

Post

Hale County (6)

All 6 communities

Haskell County (6)

All 6 communities

Hockley County (7)

All 7 communities

Howard County (5)

All 5 communities

Jones County (6)

All 6 communities

Kent County (2)

Girard, Jayton

Lamb County (7)

All 7 communities

Lubbock County (9)

All 9 communities

Lynn County (4)

All 4 communities

Martin County (2)

Midland (shared with Midland County), Stanton

Mitchell County (4)

All 4 communities

Nolan County (3)

All 3 communities

Parmer County (3)

All 3 communities

Scurry County (3)

All 3 communities

Shackelford County (3)

All 3 communities

Stonewall County (1)

Aspermont

Swisher County (3)

All 3 communities

Taylor County (9)

All 9 communities

Terry County (3)

All 3 communities

Throckmorton County (3)

All 3 communities

Yoakum County (2)

Denver City (shared with Gaines County), Plains

== List of members representing the district ==
| Member | Party | Years | Cong ress | Electoral history |
|---|---|---|---|---|
District established January 3, 1935
| George H. Mahon (Lubbock) | Democratic | January 3, 1935 – January 3, 1979 | 74th 75th 76th 77th 78th 79th 80th 81st 82nd 83rd 84th 85th 86th 87th 88th 89th 90th 91st 92nd 93rd 94th 95th | Elected in 1934. Re-elected in 1936. Re-elected in 1938. Re-elected in 1940. Re-elected in 1942. Re-elected in 1944. Re-elected in 1946. Re-elected in 1948. Re-elected in 1950. Re-elected in 1952. Re-elected in 1954. Re-elected in 1956. Re-elected in 1958. Re-elected in 1960. Re-elected in 1962. Re-elected in 1964. Re-elected in 1966. Re-elected in 1968. Re-elected in 1970. Re-elected in 1972. Re-elected in 1974. Re-elected in 1976. Retired. |
| Kent Hance (Lubbock) | Democratic | January 3, 1979 – January 3, 1985 | 96th 97th 98th | Elected in 1978. Re-elected in 1980. Re-elected in 1982. Retired to run for US Senate. |
| Larry Combest (Lubbock) | Republican | January 3, 1985 – May 31, 2003 | 99th 100th 101st 102nd 103rd 104th 105th 106th 107th 108th | Elected in 1984. Re-elected in 1986. Re-elected in 1988. Re-elected in 1990. Re-elected in 1992. Re-elected in 1994. Re-elected in 1996. Re-elected in 1998. Re-elected in 2000. Re-elected in 2002. Resigned. |
| Vacant | | May 31, 2003 – June 3, 2003 | 108th | |
| Randy Neugebauer (Lubbock) | Republican | June 3, 2003 – January 3, 2017 | 108th 109th 110th 111th 112th 113th 114th | Elected to finish Combest's term. Re-elected in 2004. Re-elected in 2006. Re-elected in 2008. Re-elected in 2010. Re-elected in 2012. Re-elected in 2014. Retired. |
| Jodey Arrington (Lubbock) | Republican | January 3, 2017 – present | 115th 116th 117th 118th 119th | Elected in 2016. Re-elected in 2018. Re-elected in 2020. Re-elected in 2022. Re-elected in 2024. Retiring. |
| Tom Sell (Lubbock) | Republican | Assuming office on January 3, 2027 | | Elected in 2026. |

== Election results ==
US House election, 2024: Texas District 19
| Party | Candidate | Votes | % |
|---|---|---|---|
| Republican | Jodey Arrington (incumbent) | 214,600 | 80.7% |
| Independent | Nathan Lewis | 27,386 | 10.3% |
| Libertarian | Bernard Johnson | 23,889 | 9.0% |
| Total votes | | 265,875 | 100.0% |
| Republican hold | | | |

US House election, 2022: Texas District 19
| Party | Candidate | Votes | % |
|---|---|---|---|
| Republican | Jodey Arrington (incumbent) | 152,321 | 80.3 |
| Independent | Nathan Lewis | 37,360 | 19.7 |
| Total votes | | 189,681 | 100.0 |
| Republican hold | | | |

US House election, 2020: Texas District 19
| Party | Candidate | Votes | % |
|---|---|---|---|
| Republican | Jodey Arrington (incumbent) | 198,198 | 74.8 |
| Democratic | Tom Watson | 60,583 | 22.9 |
| Libertarian | Joe Burnes | 6,271 | 2.4 |
| Total votes | | 265,052 | 100.0 |
| Republican hold | | | |

US House election, 2018: Texas District 19
| Party | Candidate | Votes | % |
|---|---|---|---|
| Republican | Jodey Arrington (incumbent) | 151,946 | 75.2 |
| Democratic | Miguel Levario | 50,039 | 24.8 |
| Total votes | | 201,985 | 100 |
| Republican hold | | | |

US House election, 2016: Texas District 19
| Party | Candidate | Votes | % |
|---|---|---|---|
| Republican | Jodey Arrington | 176,314 | 86.7 |
| Libertarian | Troy Bonar | 17,376 | 8.5 |
| Green | Mark Lawson | 9,785 | 4.8 |
| Total votes | | 203,475 | 100.0 |
| Republican hold | | | |

US House election, 2014: Texas District 19
| Party | Candidate | Votes | % |
|---|---|---|---|
| Republican | Randy Neugebauer (incumbent) | 90,160 | 77.2 |
| Democratic | Neal Marchbanks | 21,458 | 18.4 |
| Libertarian | Richard (Chip) Peterson | 5,146 | 4.4 |
| Independent | Donald Vance (write-in) | 54 | 0.0 |
| Total votes | | 116,818 | 100.0 |
| Republican hold | | | |

US House election, 2012: Texas District 19
| Party | Candidate | Votes | % | ±% |
|---|---|---|---|---|
| Republican | Randy Neugebauer (incumbent) | 160,136 | 85 | +7 |
| Libertarian | Richard "Chip" Peterson | 28,359 | 15 | +12 |
| Majority | | | | |
| Turnout | | 188,495 | | |
| Republican hold | | Swing | | |

US House election, 2010: Texas District 19
| Party | Candidate | Votes | % | ±% |
|---|---|---|---|---|
| Republican | Randy Neugebauer (incumbent) | 106,059 | 78 | +6 |
| Democratic | Andy Wilson | 25,984 | 19 | −6 |
| Libertarian | Richard "Chip" Peterson | 4,315 | 3 | +0 |
| Majority | | | | |
| Turnout | | 136,358 | | |
| Republican hold | | Swing | | |

US House election, 2008: Texas District 19
| Party | Candidate | Votes | % | ±% |
|---|---|---|---|---|
| Republican | Randy Neugebauer (incumbent) | 168,501 | 72 | +4 |
| Democratic | Dwight Fullingim | 58,030 | 25 | −5 |
| Libertarian | Richard "Chip" Peterson | 6,080 | 3 | +1 |
| Majority | | | | |
| Turnout | | 232,611 | | |
| Republican hold | | Swing | | |

US House election, 2006: Texas District 19
| Party | Candidate | Votes | % | ±% |
|---|---|---|---|---|
| Republican | Randy Neugebauer (incumbent) | 92,811 | 68 | +9.6 |
| Democratic | Robert Ricketts | 40,853 | 30 | −10.0 |
| Libertarian | Fred Jones | 3,300 | 2 | +.5 |
| Majority | | 48,558 | 38.0 | |
| Turnout | | 136,964 | | |
| Republican hold | | Swing | | |

US House election, 2004: Texas District 19
| Party | Candidate | Votes | % | ±% |
|---|---|---|---|---|
| Republican | Randy Neugebauer (incumbent) | 136,459 | 58.4 | −33.2 |
| Democratic | Charles Stenholm | 93,531 | 40.0 | +40.0 |
| Libertarian | Richard "Chip" Peterson | 3,524 | 1.5 | +6.9 |
| Majority | | 42,928 | 18.4 | |
| Turnout | | 233,514 | | |
| Republican hold | | Swing | -36.6 | |

== Historical district boundaries ==
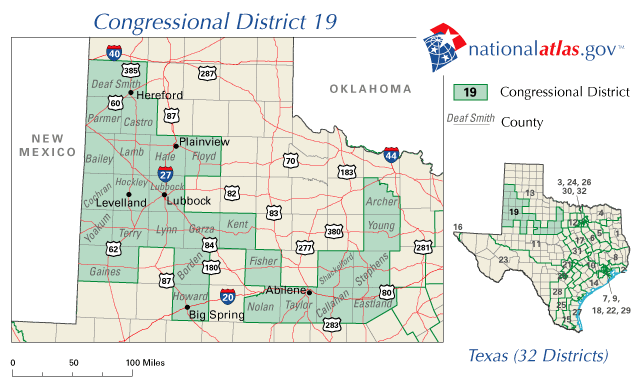
2007–2013

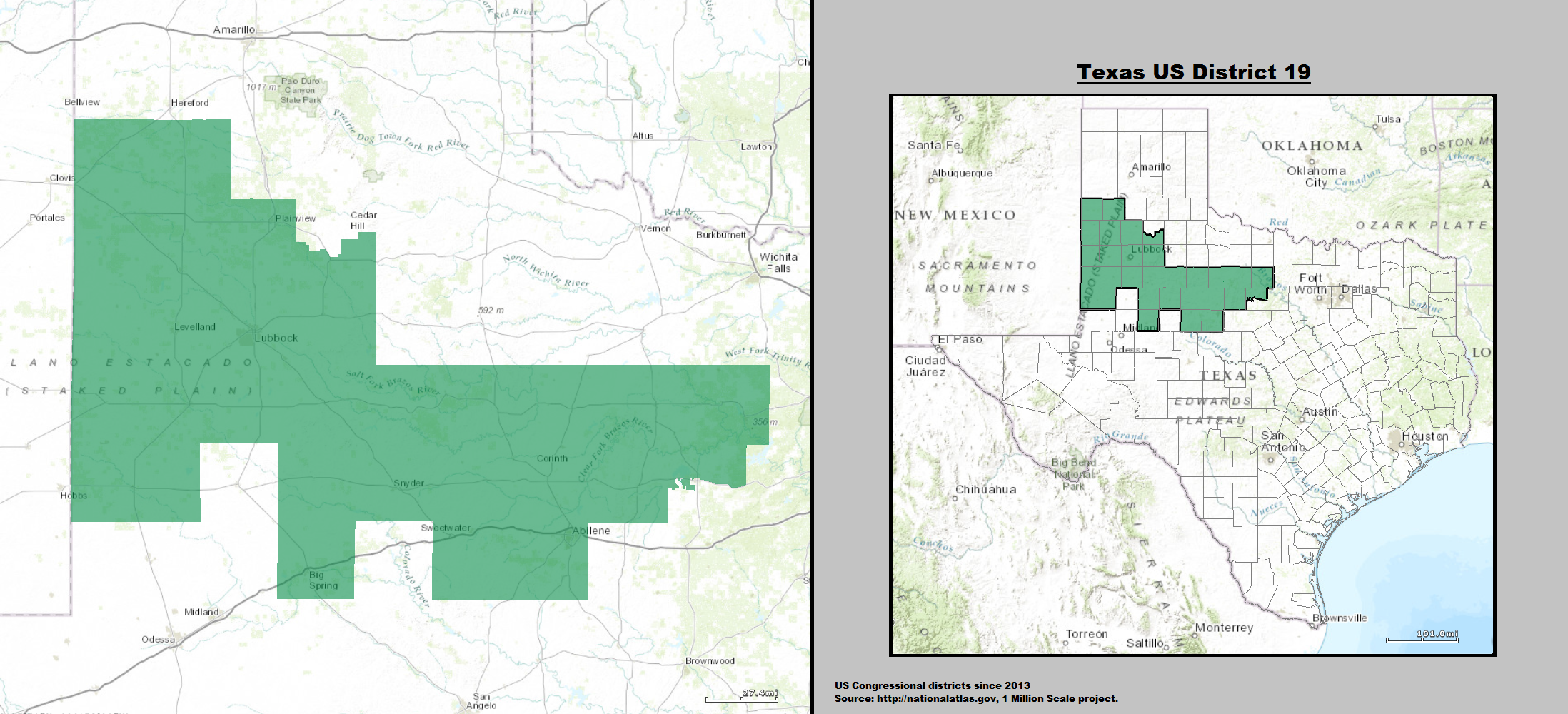
2013–2023

== See also ==
- List of United States congressional districts
