= Frankel City, Texas =

- Unincorporated community
- Location within Texas Location within the United States
- Coordinates: 32°23′03″N 102°46′56″W
- Country: United States
- State: Texas
- County: Andrews
- Elevation: 3,287 ft (1,002 m)
- Time zone: UTC-6 (Central (CST))
  - Summer (DST): UTC-5 (CDT)
- Area code: 432
- GNIS feature ID: 1378322

Frankel City is an unincorporated community in Andrews County, located in the U.S. state of Texas. It is located within the Andrews, Texas micropolitan area.

== Geography ==
Frankel City sits at the intersection of Farm to Market Roads 181 and 1967, approximately 15 miles west of Andrews in the western portion of Andrews County.

== Education ==
Students have historically attended school in neighboring Andrews. The community continues to be served by the Andrews Independent School District to this day since all of Andrews County is also one whole school district.
