= Little Bird =

Little Bird(s) may refer to:

== Film and television ==
- Little Bird (film), a 1997 Spanish drama film
- Little Bird, a 2000 British TV film directed by Aisling Walsh
- Little Birds (film), a 2011 American film by Elgin James
- Little Birds (TV series), a 2020 British series based on stories by Anaïs Nin (see below)
- Little Bird (TV series), a 2023 Canadian drama series
- Little Bird, a character from Sesame Street

== Literature ==
- Little Birds (short story collection), a 1979 book by Anaïs Nin
- Little Bird, a 2008 novel by Camilla Way

== Music ==
=== Albums ===
- Little Bird (Kasey Chambers album) or the title song, 2010
- Little Bird (Misty Edwards album) or the title song, 2014
- Little Bird, by Pete Jolly, or the title song, 1963

=== Songs ===
- "Little Bird" (Annie Lennox song), 1993
- "Little Bird" (Beach Boys song), 1968
- "Little Bird" (Kasey Chambers song), 2010
- "Little Bird", by the Beau Brummels from Bradley's Barn, 1968
- "Little Bird", by Cass Fox from Come Here, 2005
- "Little Bird", by Dr. Dog from Passed Away, Vol. 1, 2008
- "Little Bird", by Ed Sheeran from +, 2011
- "Little Bird", by Eels from End Times, 2010
- "Little Bird", by Far East Movement from Dirty Bass, 2012
- "Little Bird", by Goldfrapp from Seventh Tree, 2008
- "Little Bird", by Imogen Heap from Ellipse, 2009
- "Little Bird", by Jonas Brothers from The Album, 2023
- "Little Bird", by Lisa Hannigan from Passenger, 2011
- "Little Bird", by the White Stripes from De Stijl, 2000
- "Little Birds", by Neutral Milk Hotel, 2011

== Other uses ==
- Little Bird Bistro, a defunct French bistro in Portland, Oregon, US
- Jimmy Heath (1926–2020), nicknamed "Little Bird", American jazz saxophonist
- MD Helicopters MH-6 Little Bird, an American military helicopter
