= Collinsworth =

Collinsworth may refer to:

- Cris Collinsworth (born 1959), American football player and broadcaster
- Eden Collinsworth (born 1952), American author and businesswoman
- George Morse Collinsworth (1810–1866), Texian soldier, planter, and civil servant
- Jac Collinsworth (born 1995), American sportscaster
- James Collinsworth (1806–1838), American-born lawyer and political figure in the Republic of Texas
- Kyle Collinsworth (born 1991), American basketball player
