= Andrews Middle School =

Andrews Middle School may refer to:

- Andrews Independent School District
- Cherokee County Schools (North Carolina)
