= Misty Edwards discography =

This is the discography for contemporary Christian music artist Misty Edwards.

== Discography ==
List of all musical works, with selected chart positions
Title	Album details	Peak chart positions			
Title	Album details	US	US Christ	US Indie	US Heat
Eternity	Released: December 5, 2003; Label: Forerunner; CD, digital download	–	–	–	–
Always on His Mind	Released: December 1, 2005; Label: Forerunner; CD, digital download	–	–	–	–
Relentless	Released: December 20, 2007; Label: Forerunner; CD, digital download	–	–	–	–
Fling Wide	Released: December 28, 2009; Label: Forerunner; CD, digital download	–	21	46	10
Point of Life	Released: April 6, 2010; Label: Forerunner; CD, digital download	–	45	–	27
Measure of Love (with David Brymer)	Released: December 21, 2011; Label: Forerunner; CD, digital download	–	24	–	16
Only a Shadow	Released: March 19, 2013; Label: Forerunner; CD, digital download	107	7	21	–
Little Bird	Released: December 29, 2014; Label: Forerunner; CD, digital download	–	7	23	–
