= Andrews High School (Texas) =

Location
- 1400 NW Avenue K Andrews, Andrews County, Texas 79714-3860; United States; 32.3255°N 102.5679°W

Information
- School type: Public, high school
- Locale: Town: Distant
- School district: Andrews ISD
- NCES School ID: 480828000194
- Principal: Robert Webb
- Staff: 83.32 (on an FTE basis)
- Grades: 9–12
- Enrollment: 1,196 (2023–2024)
- Student to teacher ratio: 14.35
- Colors: Black and gold
- Athletics conference: UIL, AAAA
- Mascot: Mustang/Lady Mustang
- Yearbook: The Mustang
- Website: Andrews High School

Andrews High School or AHS is a public high school based in Andrews, Texas, United States and classified as a 4A school by the University Interscholastic League (UIL). It is a part of the Andrews Independent School District which serves all of Andrews County. During 2023–2024, Andrews High School had an enrollment of 1,196 students and a student to teacher ratio of 14.35. The school received an overall rating of "B" from the Texas Education Agency for the 2024–2025 school year.

== History ==
In recent years, a new multi-use sports facility has been added which includes a swimming pool with a separate diving well, a basketball stadium, and a new performance center. AHS is further recognized to be an achieving academic school, with a variety of State Awards in UIL Accounting, Computer Applications, Lincoln-Douglas Debate, CX Debate, Computer Science, and UIL One Act Play. For the 2021-2022 school year, the school was given a B by the Texas Education Agency.

The school has an official National Forensics Association Charter, is an active National Speech and Debate school, and has regularly been noted in its state-ranking football team. The school also hosts an Aviation Academy which is a four year program split between the high school and Guilford Technical Community College. A similar program is also in place to fast track a career in education with little or no debt. After graduation the students are committed to being a teacher at the school for at least three years.

In 2021, the high school playoff game between Andrews and Springtown was postponed after the Andrews High School marching band was involved in a crash where three people died. The school's band director and the bus driver, a retired math teacher were both killed, along with the driver of the pickup that was going the wrong way before striking the bus.

== Athletics ==
The Andrews Mustangs compete in these sports -

- Baseball
- Basketball
- Cross Country
- Football
- Golf
- Powerlifting
- Softball
- Swimming
- Tennis
- Track and Field
- Volleyball

=== State titles ===
- Band 2020
- Baseball -
  - 1999(4A)
- Boys Golf -
  - 1960(3A), 1987(4A), 1999(4A), 2013(3A), 2014(3A)
- Girls Golf -
  - 1987(4A), 1989(4A), 1990(4A), 1991(4A), 1992(4A), 1996(4A), 2007(3A), 2008(3A), 2011(3A), 2012(3A), 2013(3A), 2014(3A), 2015(4A), 2016(4A), 2017(4A), 2018(4A), 2019(4A), 2021(4A), 2023(4A), 2024(4A), 2025(4A), 2026(4A)
- Boys Track -
  - 1954(1A), 1958(2A), 1959(3A), 1960(3A), 1961(3A), 1981(4A)
- Boys Swimming 2023(4A)

== Notable alumni ==
- Chad Campbell, PGA
- Jeff Lebby, Mississippi State University Head Football Coach
- Max Lucado, author
- Ted Nelson, track and field coach at Texas A&M University
- C. Wesley Roberts, Texas State Representative
- Shaud Williams, NFL, Mississippi State University Head strength and conditioning coach
