= Shafter Lake, Texas =

Shafter Lake
- Ghost town
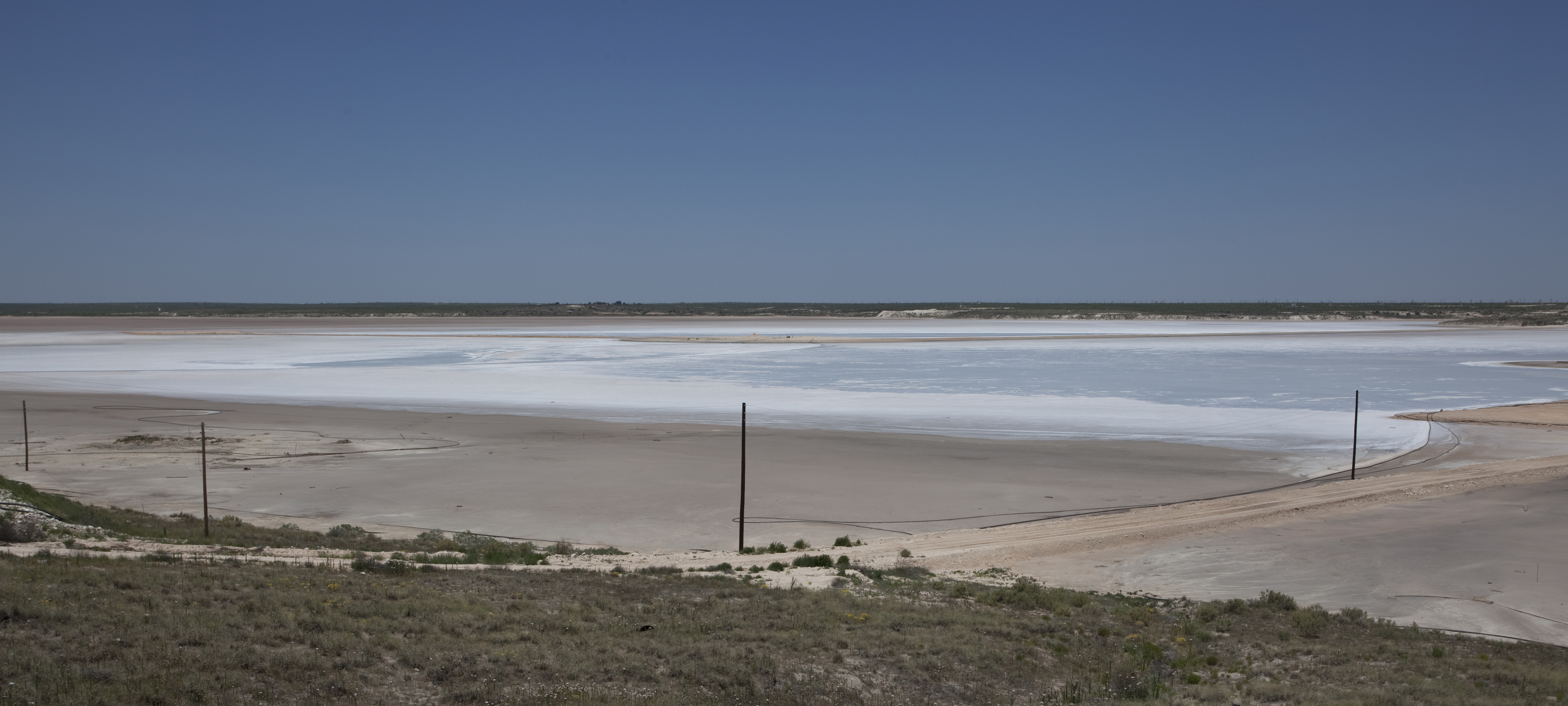
- Shafter Lake

- Location within Texas Location within the United States
- Coordinates: 32°24′16″N 102°39′58″W
- Country: United States
- State: Texas
- County: Andrews
- Region: Llano Estacado
- Established: 1907
- Founder: J.F. Bustin
- Elevation: 3,166 ft (965 m)
- Time zone: UTC-6 (CST)

Shafter Lake is a ghost town in Andrews County, Texas, United States, located four miles west of U.S. Route 385 on the shores of a large salt playa named Shafter Lake. It became a ghost town after the town lost an election for county seat of Andrews County.

== History ==
Located in north central Andrews County, the town developed as part of the early 20th-century land boom in West Texas. A local businessman, J.F. Bustin, convinced the firm Pierce and Powers to found a town on the north shore of a shallow alkali playa lake lying fifty feet below the elevation of the surrounding land. The town's original name was Salt Lake. Later it and the lake were renamed after the army officer who had discovered the lake in 1875, William R. Shafter. Shafter Lake was platted in August 1907 and by early September had become a busy village.

The early years of the town were its most successful. Through 1910, the village continued to grow and prosper. One of the most ardent supporters of Shafter Lake was the editor of the local paper, the Shafter Lake Herald. James T. Cumley's editorials were sprinkled with nothing but praise for the upstart community. His edits boasted of the area's rich soil and the recreation potential of Shafter Lake. He also published some of the favorable feedback that visitors to Shafter Lake had uttered. Cumley distributed thousands of copies of the Herald across America and especially throughout the Midwest.

Scarcely a month after the town was platted, wagon trains of freight could be observed leaving for Lubbock. Still others could be seen hauling in lumber from Midland for new home construction in Shafter Lake. Other wagon trains and their requisite wagoneers would stop and rest in the village before resuming their journey. Within two months, the town had over 50 new homes and a school was preparing to open. The year of the town's founding saw the opening of the Shafter Lake post office; its first postmaster was Bert M. Irwin. Rumors abounded during 1907 of the proposed Llano Estacado, Mexico and Gulf Railroad between Dalhart and Chihuahua City, Mexico with headquarters in Shafter Lake. Surveyors did arrive in Shafter Lake and construction was scheduled to begin in 1909, but only one mile was ever graded.

Shafter Lake reached its zenith when its population reached 500 in 1910, but it began to decline soon afterward. It had a bank, three churches, a school, a general store, a blacksmith and two hotels.

== Decline ==
An intertown feud developed between Shafter Lake and nearby Andrews for the title of county seat. In June, a controversial election was held. Some of the controversy stemmed from both towns' efforts to acquire eligible voters. The election went off regardless, and Shafter Lake lost to Andrews by a narrow margin. After the loss, the town declined rapidly. By 1912, most of Shafter Lake's residents had moved to Andrews. In 1980, only a dilapidated cemetery remained. Its twelve graves and one original building are all that remain of a once bustling West Texas boom town. Today, at the site one can find a ranch operation run by the descendants of the town's first postmaster.

== See also ==
- Playa lake
- Llano Estacado
- West Texas
