= Richard Andrews (soldier) =

Captain Richard Andrews
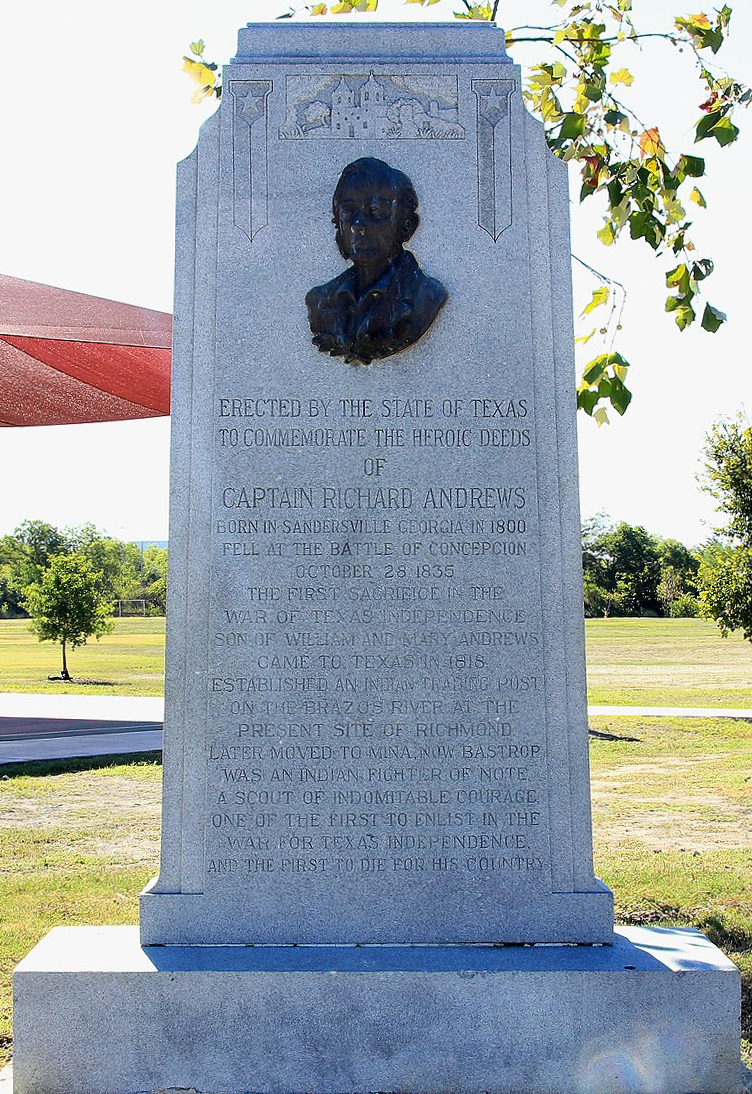
- 1936 Texas Centennial Monument

Personal details
- Born: 1800 Sandersville, Georgia
- Died: October 28, 1835 (aged 35) Mission Concepción, San Antonio de Béxar, Mexico
- Nickname: Big Dick

Military service
- Branch/service: Texian Militia; Texian Army
- Years of service: 1827–1835
- Battles/wars: Texas-Indian Wars; Texas Revolution; Battle of Gonzales; Battle of Concepción †

Richard Andrews (1800-1835) was a Texian merchant and soldier who was the first killed in action casualty of the Texas Revolution during the Battle of Concepción on October 28, 1835. He is a folk hero (the "Nathan Hale of Texas") for his purported final words "I am a dead man, but don't let the other boys know it. Tell them to conquer or die."

He is purportedly also the first wounded in action casualty of the war at the Battle of Gonzales on October 2, 1835. However, Samuel McCulloch Jr. is considered by some historians to be the first at the Battle of Goliad on October 10, 1835.

== Biography ==
Andrews, an Indian fighter, joined the Texian army at the beginning of the Texas Revolution. Andrews was nicknamed "Big Dick" because of his large size and great strength. He was wounded in the Battle of Gonzales on October 2, 1835. He fought at the Battle of Concepción on October 28, 1835, where he was the only Texian killed in the battle. His purported final words were "I am a dead man, but don't let the other boys know it. Tell them to conquer or die."

A memorial to Captain Andrews was erected by the State of Texas and stands approximately .15 miles west of Mission Road on E. Theo Avenue near Concepcion Park, in San Antonio, Texas.

== Legacy ==
=== Monuments ===
- "The First Sacrifice in the War of Texas Independence", 1936 Texas Centennial Monument, San Antonio Missions National Historical Park.

It reads:

Erected by the State of Texas to Commemorate the Heroic Deeds of Captain Richard Andrews.

Born in Sandersville, Georgia in 1800. Fell at the Battle of Concepcion October 28, 1835. The first sacrifice in the War of Texas Independence. Son of William and Mary Andrews. Came to Texas in 1818. Established an Indian Trading Post on the Brazos River at the present site of Richmond. Later moved to Mina, now Bastrop. Was an Indian fighter of note. A scout of indomitable courage. One of the first to enlist in the War for Texas Independence and the first to die for his country.

=== Namesakes ===
- Andrews County
- Andrews, Texas

== See also ==
- Samuel McCulloch Jr.
- Come and take it
- Battle of Concepcion
- Siege of Bexar
- Texas Revolution

== Sources ==
- History of Fort Bend County, Clarence Wharton, 1939.
