= National Register of Historic Places listings in Andrews County, Texas =

Location of Andrews County in Texas

This is a list of the National Register of Historic Places listings in Andrews County, Texas.

This is intended to be a complete list of properties listed on the National Register of Historic Places in Andrews County, Texas. There is one property listed on the National Register in the county.

This National Park Service list is complete through NPS recent listings posted March 21, 2025.

== Current listings ==
	Name on the Register	Image	Date listed	Location	City or town	Description
1	Andrews Lake Sites		November 22, 1978 (#78002886)	Address restricted	Andrews	

== See also ==
- National Register of Historic Places listings in Texas
- Recorded Texas Historic Landmarks in Andrews County
