= Andrews County Veterans Memorial =

Veterans Engraved Granite Memorial in Texas

Coordinates: 32.3175°N 102.5542°W

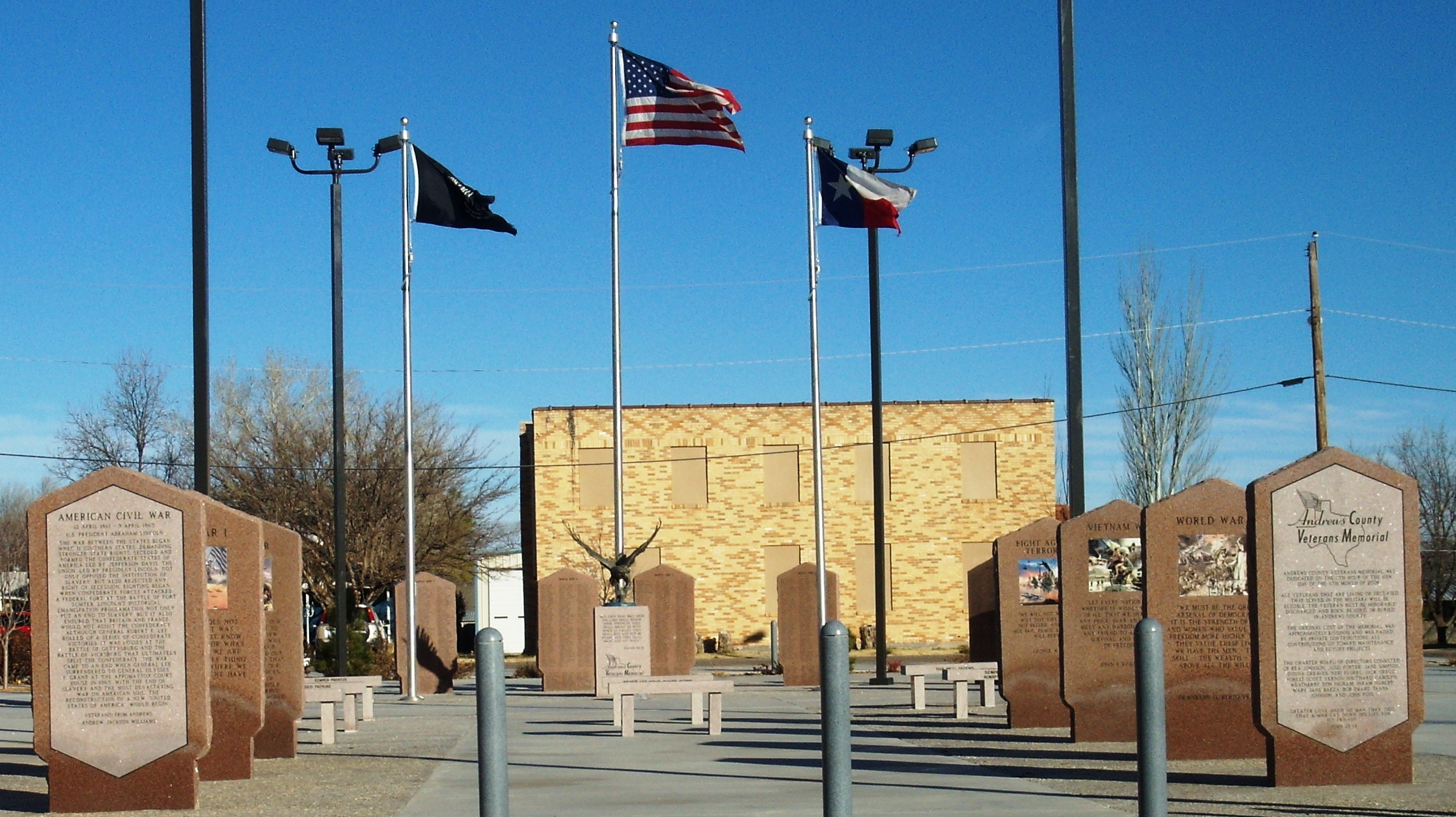
- Artist: Ray Simon
- Year: 2006
- Type: Granite
- Location: Andrews, Texas, United States

The Andrews County Veteran Memorial is a memorial in Andrews, Texas which was created in 2006 as a tribute to those Andrews County residents who have served in the United States' armed forces. On entering the Andrews County Veterans Memorial, one can see fifteen engraved granite tablets. Each tablet is three feet wide and six feet tall, and weighs 2000 pounds. The tablets were built and installed by Sadler & Son Monument Works of Hobbs, New Mexico. The names of 2600 veterans from Andrews County are engraved on the tablets. The memorial incorporates works of art by Ray Simon of Youngstown, Ohio, and was completed at a cost of $150,000 which was raised via donation.

Soldiers from every major conflict in which America has participated are honored. There are three fallen Andrews County Soldiers honored at the memorial: Kenneth L. Boykin, Ronald D. Horn, and Ray M. Bevel.
