= Samuel McCulloch Jr. =

First Texian casualty of the Texas Revolution

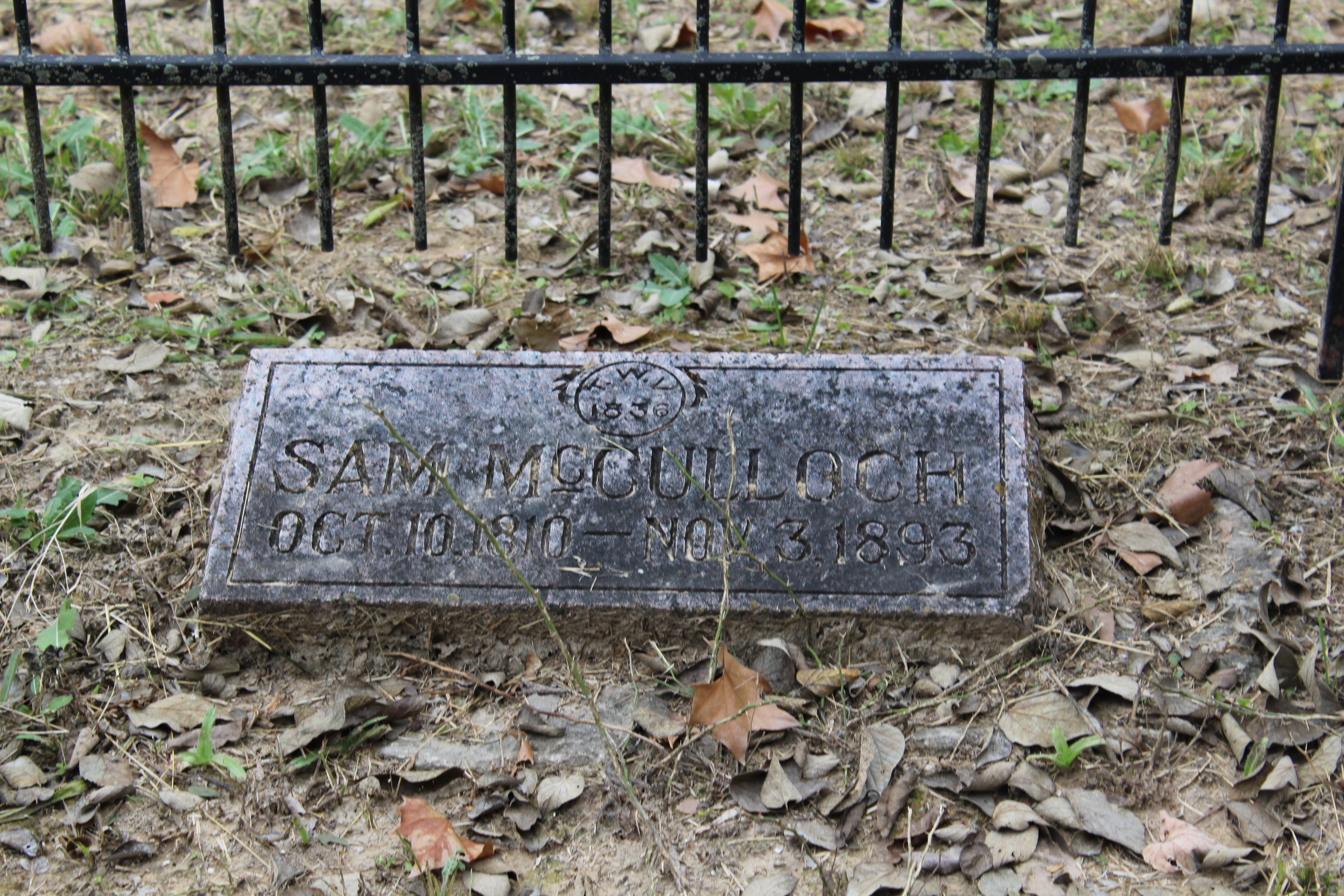
- McCulloch's grave, McCulloch Cemetery near Von Ormy, Texas
- Born: October 11, 1810; Alabama, U.S.
- Died: November 2, 1893 (aged 83); Von Ormy, Texas, U.S.
- Occupations: Republic of Texas soldier, First Texian casualty of the Texas Revolution

Samuel McCulloch Jr. (October 11, 1810 – November 2, 1893) was a free African-American soldier who became known as the first Texian casualty of the Texas Revolution, being wounded in action in the Battle of Goliad on October 10, 1835. However, Richard Andrews was the first wounded in action, at the Battle of Gonzales on October 2, as well as the first killed in action, at the Battle of Concepción on October 28.

== Early life ==
Samuel McCulloch Jr. was born on October 11, 1810, in Alabama. His white father, Samuel McCulloch Sr., had three daughters. There is no mention of Samuel's mother in any official record. His father moved the family to Montgomery, Alabama, in 1815. They relocated to Jackson County, Texas, on the Lavaca River in 1835. Five months after their arrival in the Texas territory of Mexico, the Texas Revolution broke out and Samuel Jr. took up the cause.

== Texas Revolution ==
Samuel McCulloch Jr. joined the Matagorda Volunteer Company under the command of George M. Collinsworth, even though he had only lived in Texas for five months. He fought in the Battle of Goliad. McCulloch attempted to storm into the officers' barracks and in the process took a bullet to the shoulder, which made him among the first soldiers wounded in the Texas Revolution. The shot shattered his shoulder. For the next year, the wound left him disabled, and even after the wound healed, it continued to affect him for the rest of his life. By April 1836, McCulloch was able to return home, although the family was forced to flee as the advancing Mexican Army drove the Texan revolutionaries north. On July 8 of that year, McCulloch's wound would be finally tended to by a doctor, who removed the musket ball from his shoulder.

== Legal trouble in the new republic ==
McCulloch soon found himself living in a country that had just banned all free blacks from living there. With the passing of the Texas Constitution in 1836, all people of African and Native American descent were denied citizenship. McCulloch petitioned the Congress of the Republic of Texas for an exemption to the law. In April, he was granted the exemption, along with the land grant that he was entitled to for his service in the Texas army.

In August 1837, he married Mary Vess, a white woman. This marriage violated the Texas ban on interracial unions. The couple was never prosecuted, however. They had four sons and lived most of the remainder of their lives near Van Ormy, a town a few miles south of San Antonio.

In 1840, McCulloch and his sisters were exempted from the Ashworth Act, and they lived in Texas until their deaths.
