= McKinney Acres, Texas =

- Census-designated place
- Location within Texas
- Coordinates: 32°17′47″N 102°31′47″W
- Country: United States
- State: Texas
- County: Andrews

Area
  - Total: 1.7 sq mi (4.3 km^{2})
  - Land: 1.7 sq mi (4.3 km^{2})
  - Water: 0 sq mi (0 km^{2})
- Elevation: 3,175 ft (968 m)

Population (2020)
  - Total: 852
  - Density: 510/sq mi (200/km^{2})
- Time zone: UTC-6 (Central (CST))
  - Summer (DST): UTC-5 (CDT)
- ZIP code: 79714
- Area code: 432
- FIPS code: 48-45750
- GNIS feature ID: 2034056

McKinney Acres is a census-designated place (CDP) in Andrews County, Texas, United States. As of the 2020 census, McKinney Acres had a population of 852. This was a new CDP for the 2010 census.

== Geography ==
It lies along the southern border of Andrews, the county seat. U.S. Route 385 runs along the western edge of the CDP, leading south 32 miles (51 km) to Odessa.

According to the United States Census Bureau, the CDP has a total area of 1.7 square miles (4.3 km^{2}), all land.

== Demographics ==
Historical population
Census	Pop.	Note	%±
2010	815		—
2020	852		4.5%
U.S. Decennial Census; 1850–1900 1910; 1920 1930 1940; 1950 1960 1970; 1980 1990 2000; 2010 2020

McKinney Acres first appeared as a census designated place in the 2010 U.S. census.

=== 2020 census ===
McKinney Acres CDP, Texas – Racial and ethnic composition Note: the US Census treats Hispanic/Latino as an ethnic category. This table excludes Latinos from the racial categories and assigns them to a separate category. Hispanics/Latinos may be of any race.
Race / Ethnicity (NH = Non-Hispanic)	Pop 2010	Pop 2020	% 2010	% 2020
White alone (NH)	306	259	37.55%	30.40%
Black or African American alone (NH)	8	3	0.98%	0.35%
Native American or Alaska Native alone (NH)	8	2	0.98%	0.23%
Asian alone (NH)	4	0	0.49%	0.00%
Native Hawaiian or Pacific Islander alone (NH)	0	0	0.00%	0.00%
Other Race alone (NH)	2	4	0.25%	0.47%
Mixed race or Multiracial (NH)	5	2	0.61%	0.23%
Hispanic or Latino (any race)	482	582	59.14%	68.31%
Total	815	852	0.00%	0.00%
