= Eunice Municipal Schools =

School district in New Mexico, United States

Eunice Municipal Schools is a school district headquartered in Eunice, New Mexico.

The district is entirely in Lea County and includes Eunice.

== History ==
In 2019 the district had 820 students in its 80th day of operations, while on the same day mark in 2020 this was down to 740. Dwain Haynes, the superintendent, stated this was due to economic problems in the Eunice area. Another factor was restrictions in New Mexico during the COVID-19 pandemic in New Mexico, while Texas schools at the time lacked such restrictions.

== Schools ==
- Eunice High School
- Caton Middle School
  - In 2019 the district announced plans to build its current 47,000-square-foot (4,400 m^{2}) campus, for $30,000,000.
- Mettie Jordan Elementary
