= Shaud Williams =

American football player and coach (born 1980)

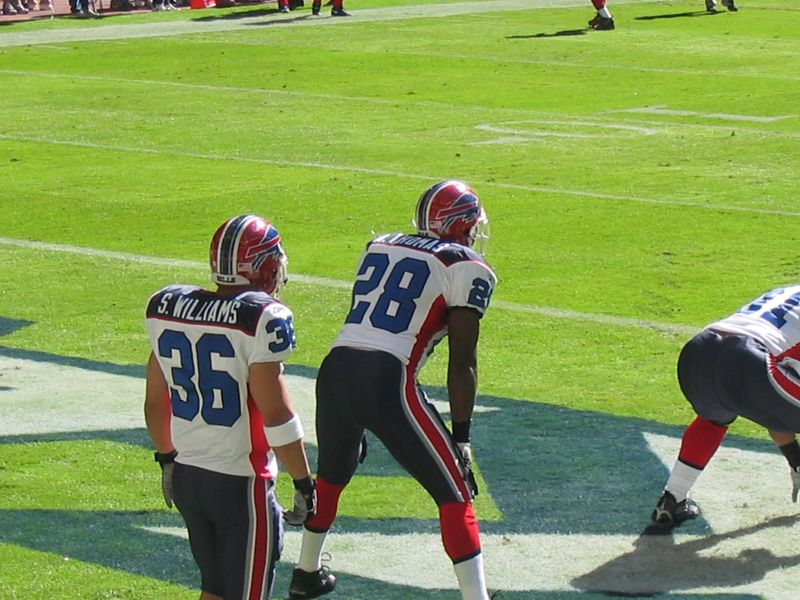
- Williams (#36) with Anthony Thomas (#28)

Mississippi State Bulldogs
- Title: Head strength and conditioning coach

Personal information
- Born: October 2, 1980 (age 46); Andrews, Texas, U.S.
- Listed height: 5 ft 7 in (1.70 m)
- Listed weight: 193 lb (88 kg)

Career information
- High school: Andrews
- College: Alabama
- NFL draft: 2004: undrafted

Career history

Playing
- Buffalo Bills (2004–2007); Florida Tuskers (2009); Omaha Nighthawks (2010–2011); West Texas Drillers (2014)

Coaching
- Andrews HS (2014–2016) Strength and conditioning coach; Wisconsin (2017) Assistant strength and conditioning coach; Oregon (2018–2023) Assistant strength and conditioning coach; Mississippi State (2024–present) Head strength and conditioning coach

Awards and highlights
- Big 12 Offensive Freshman of the Year (1999); Second-team All-SEC (2003)

Career NFL statistics
- Rushing yards: 330
- Rushing average: 3.7
- Rushing touchdowns: 2
- Receptions: 20
- Receiving yards: 137
- Stats at Pro Football Reference

Shaud Rashae Williams (born October 2, 1980) is an American college football coach and former running back. He is the head strength and conditioning coach for Mississippi State University, a position he has held since 2024. Originally from Andrews, Texas, Williams played college football and baseball at Texas Tech and Alabama. He was signed by the Buffalo Bills as an undrafted free agent in 2004 and played three seasons with the Bills. From 2009 to 2011, Williams played in the UFL, first for the Florida Tuskers in 2009 and Omaha Nighthawks in 2010 and 2011.

After his playing career, Williams became a strength and conditioning coach, first at his high school in Andrews, then at the college level at Wisconsin in 2017 before joining Oregon in 2018.

== Early life ==
Born in Andrews, Texas, Williams graduated from Andrews High School in 1999. During his career at Andrews, he rushed for 7,712 yards, and is 11th all time in career carries with 1006 in Texas High School Football. In his senior season, he rushed for 2,121 yards and 27 touchdowns, leading all rushers in class 4A. In 2009, Williams was inducted in the Texas High School Football Hall of Fame.

== College football career ==
Williams first attended Texas Tech University. He played at running back for Texas Tech Red Raiders football in 1999 and 2000 under head coaches Spike Dykes and Mike Leach. Williams rushed for 658 yards and seven touchdowns as a freshman, for which he earned the Big 12 Offensive Freshman of the Year award in 1999. In 2000, Williams played in 12 games after missing most of spring camp due to a hamstring injury. He had 226 rushing and 299 receiving yards.

In 2001, Williams transferred to the University of Alabama. Redshirting the 2001 season due to NCAA transfer rules, Williams played at running back for Alabama Crimson Tide football from 2002 to 2003 under Dennis Franchione.

Due to an early season-ending injury to Ahmaad Galloway, Williams immediately became starting running back at Alabama. In his debut with Alabama, Williams had an 80-yard touchdown run on the opening play from scrimmage against Arkansas. Sharing the halfback spot with Santonio Beard, Williams led Alabama in rushing with 921 yards and five touchdowns on 130 carries, for an average of 7.1 yards per carry on a team that finished 10–3 and no. 11. In his first full year as a starter in 2003, Williams was the best rusher in the Southeastern Conference (SEC) with 1,367 yards and 14 touchdowns. He was named to the All-SEC second-team. Williams graduated from Alabama in December 2003 with a Bachelor of Science in marketing.

While playing running back at University of Alabama, Shaud was interviewed by Brüno Gehard, a character portrayed by Sacha Baron Cohen.

== College baseball career ==
After graduating from high school, Williams was selected in the 13th round of the 1999 Major League Baseball draft by the Atlanta Braves, but Williams chose college instead; he would never play professionally. In the spring of 2001, he played nine games and batted .200 with three hits and two RBI for Texas Tech Red Raiders baseball. At Alabama, Williams played 10 games and batted .286. Williams played at shortstop for both schools.

== Professional football career ==
=== Buffalo Bills ===
Following the 2004 NFL draft, Williams signed with the Buffalo Bills as an undrafted free agent. In three seasons with the Bills from 2004 to 2006, Williams played in 25 games, with 330 yards and two touchdowns on 89 carries.

Williams was fourth on the depth chart behind Marshawn Lynch, Fred Jackson, and Dwayne Wright. He re-signed with the Bills on December 6, 2007, after being released in training camp.

=== Later career ===
Williams was signed by the Florida Tuskers of the United Football League on September 9, 2009. Williams rushed for 152 yards, received for seven yards, and returned two kickoffs for 33 yards in six games with the Tuskers in 2009.

He was selected by the Omaha Nighthawks in the 2010 UFL expansion draft. Williams played in eight games with one start with the Nighthawks in 2010, with 106 rushing, 20 receiving, 137 punt return, and 295 kick return yards. In 2011, Williams played in four games for the Nighthawks, with 32 carries for 172 yards and two touchdowns and three catches for 19 yards.

In 2014, Williams returned to playing football, with the West Texas Drillers of the semi-pro Southwest American Football League.

== Coaching career ==
Williams returned to Andrews, Texas after his football career to start a strength and conditioning program for child and teenage athletes. Starting in 2014, Williams was the strength and conditioning coach for the Andrews High School athletics program. He left that job in 2017 to become an assistant strength coach at the University of Wisconsin. After one year at Wisconsin, Williams took the same position at Oregon under Mario Cristobal.
