= Texas State Highway 176 =

State highway in Texas

State Highway 176
- Andrews Highway
- SH 176, highlighted in red

Route information
- Maintained by TxDOT
- Length: 90.00 mi (144.84 km)
- Existed: 1953 (1990)–present

Major junctions
- West end: NM 176 near Eunice, NM
- US 385 in Andrews; SH 349 in Tarzan
- East end: I-20 in Big Spring

Location
- Country: United States
- State: Texas
- Counties: Andrews, Martin, Howard

Highway system
- Highways in Texas; Interstate; US; State; Former; Toll; Loops; Spurs; FM/RM; Park; Rec
← SH 175	→ SH 177

State Highway 176 (SH 176) is a Texas state highway running from the New Mexico state line east to Big Spring. It is most commonly known as the Andrews Highway.

== History ==
SH 176 was originally designated on September 22, 1932, as a connector route between Tyler and the Gregg–Rusk county line. On May 23, 1933, SH 176 was extended to Kilgore. On September 26, 1939, this route had been reassigned to SH 31 when its path was shifted south.

The current routing was first cosigned, but not designated, on September 29, 1953, concurrent with FM 87. On August 29, 1990, this route was officially designated, canceling FM 87.

== Major intersections ==
County	Location	mi	km	Destinations	Notes
Andrews		0.00	0.00	NM 176 west	Continuation into New Mexico
Andrews	Andrews	30.40	48.92	SH 115 west – Kermit	Western terminus of concurrency with SH 115
Andrews	Andrews	31.50	50.69	US 385 – Andrews	
Andrews		33.90	54.56	SH 115 east – Patricia	Eastern terminus of concurrency with SH 115
Martin	Tarzan	53.60	86.26	SH 349 – Lamesa, Midland	Diamond interchange
Martin	Lenorah	74.60	120.06	SH 137 – Lamesa, Stanton	
Howard	Big Spring	93.00	149.67	I-20 – Colorado City, Midland	Exit 176 on I-20
1.000 mi = 1.609 km; 1.000 km = 0.621 mi: Concurrency terminus
