= Only a Shadow =

Live album by Misty Edwards
- Released: March 19, 2013
- Genre: CCM, worship, rock
- Length: 73:12
- Label: Forerunner Music

Misty Edwards chronology
Measure of Love (EP) (2011)	Only a Shadow (2013)	Little Bird (2014)

Only a Shadow is a live album by Misty Edwards, released by Forerunner Music on March 19, 2013.

== Reception ==
Professional ratings
Review scores
Source	Rating
CCM Magazine	3/5 stars
Cross Rhythms	9/10 squares
New Release Tuesday	4.5/5 stars

Matt Conner, awarding the album three stars from CCM Magazine, stated "[it] is a powerful album filled with vertical anthems and prophetic moments". Giving the album four and a half stars at New Release Tuesday, Kevin Davis wrote "The ethereal musical style and Misty’s powerful and gorgeous vocals keep me hanging on every word she sings and speaks". Stephen Curry, rating the album a nine out of ten for Cross Rhythms opined "The 14 songs on the CD capture Misty's soaring vocals while displaying a heart for worship transparent in its sincerity".

== Track listing ==
No.	Title	Length
1.	"Ezekiel 1 (Spontaneous)"	5:29
2.	"Baptize My Heart"	5:54
3.	"Only a Shadow"	6:55
4.	"Shine like the Stars"	5:48
5.	"When You Think of Me"	3:30
6.	"Selah (When You Think of Me)"	3:21
7.	"God Is Love"	2:11
8.	"I Will Waste My Life"	6:14
9.	"Do You Know the Way You Move Me (Spontaneous)"	7:17
10.	"Pour My Love on You"	4:34
11.	"I Give it All"	6:25
12.	"You Set Your Love on Me"	4:58
13.	"I Love Your Ways"	5:38
14.	"Between the Cherubim"	4:58
Total length:		45:04

== Charts ==
Chart (2013)	Peak position
US Billboard 200	107
US Christian Albums (Billboard)	9
US Independent Albums (Billboard)	21

== See also ==
- Misty Edwards discography
