= National Enrichment Facility =

American nuclear facility

Coordinates: 32.4356°N 103.0796°W

The National Enrichment Facility (NEF) is a nuclear facility for the enrichment of uranium associated with the Los Alamos National Laboratory. The plant uses a gas centrifuge technology known as Zippe-type centrifuges. It is located 5 miles (8.0 km) east of Eunice, New Mexico. The NEF is operated by Louisiana Energy Services (LES), which is in turn owned by the Urenco Group. As of 2011, LES operates as URENCO USA.

NEF employs a new type of license, the 10 CFR Part 2. It is a combination license granted by the Nuclear Regulatory Commission (NRC) allowing the plant to proceed directly from construction to operation. First of its kind, this means NEF will be closely watched by many parties in the nuclear community.

The original proposed budget was US$1.5 billion, but this increased to US$3 billion for an enlarged facility capable of 5.9 million SWU at full capacity.

Since the Dedication Ceremony in October 2008, the company has grown to 236 employees with an annual payroll of US$23 million. At full capacity, NEF can provide 50% of the current enriched uranium demand for civilian nuclear power plants in the U.S. The NEF commenced operations in June 2010.

It is located in an area known as "nuclear alley", which also includes the Waste Isolation Pilot Plant and Waste Control Specialists.

== Timeline ==
- 23 June 2006: LES was granted license to commence building the facility.
- 29 August 2006: Groundbreaking ceremony takes place at the NEF site.
- 22 October 2008: Dedication ceremony
- 15 February 2009: First shipment of Uranium hexafluoride for acceptance testing
- 10 June 2010: Received authorization to bring UF_{6} feed stock on-site
- 13 June 2010: First shipment of UF_{6} feed material arrives on-site
- 25 June 2010: Enrichment of UF_{6} officially begins in Cascade #1
- 14 August 2012: First cascade of phase II started up
- January 2013: Phase I of construction officially complete
