= New Mexico State Road 176 =

State highway in New Mexico, United States

State Road 176
- NM 176 highlighted in red

Route information
- Maintained by NMDOT
- Length: 41.201 mi (66.307 km)

Major junctions
- West end: US 62 / US 180 / NM 243 near Carlsbad
- NM 18 near Eunice
- East end: SH 176 at the Texas state border near Eunice

Location
- Country: United States
- State: New Mexico
- Counties: Lea

Highway system
- New Mexico State Highway System; Interstate; US; State; Scenic
← NM 175	→ NM 177

State Road 176 (NM 176) is a 41.201-mile-long (66.307 km) state highway in the US state of New Mexico. NM 176's western terminus is at U.S. Route 62 (US 62), US 180 and NM 243 northeast of Carlsbad, and the eastern terminus is a continuation as Texas State Highway 176 (SH 176) at the Texas/ New Mexico border.

== Major intersections ==
The entire route is in Lea County.

Location	mi	km	Destinations	Notes
	0.000	0.000	US 62 / US 180 / NM 243 west	Western terminus, eastern terminus of NM 243
	28.488	45.847	NM 8 north	Southern terminus of NM 8
Eunice	34.933	56.219	NM 248 north	Northern terminus of NM 248
Eunice	35.257	56.741	NM 207 south	Northern terminus of NM 207
	37.820	60.865	NM 18	
	41.201	66.307	SH 176	Eastern terminus, continues east at the Texas/ New Mexico border
1.000 mi = 1.609 km; 1.000 km = 0.621 mi
