= Waste Control Specialists =

Coordinates: 32°26′34″N 103°03′06″W

Waste Control Specialists LLC
- Company type: Private
- Industry: Waste Management
- Founded: 1989
- Headquarters: New York City, New York
- Key people: J.F. Lehman & Company, Owner
- Number of employees: 122
- Website: www.wcstexas.com

Waste Control Specialists LLC (WCS) is a treatment, storage, & disposal company dealing in radioactive, hazardous, and mixed wastes. Developed and controlled by Texas billionaire investor Harold Simmons until his death at the end of 2013, the company was founded in Dallas, Texas in 1989 as a landfill operator, and awarded a unique license for disposal of low level radioactive waste in 2009. Its main operations are in Andrews County, Texas.

J.F. Lehman & Company (JFLCO) acquired Waste Control Specialists LLC from Valhi, Inc. in January 2018. The acquisition represents JFLCO's fourth platform investment in the environmental and technical services sector.

WCS also has a strategic partnership with J.F Lehman & Company portfolio company NorthStar Group Holdings, Inc., a leading provider of specialized environmental and technical services for commercial and government end markets, to support domestic electric utilities in safely decommissioning nuclear power generation sites.

In partnership with Orano the company pursued a license for a consolidated interim storage facility (CISF). The license was issued in September of 2021. The license was challenged in court by the State of Texas which contends the license is not legal and seeks to invalidate the licensing decision. In August 2023 the United States Court of Appeals for the Fifth Circuit ruled that the NRC does not have the authority from Congress to license such a temporary storage facility that is not at a nuclear power station or federal site, nullifying the purported license.

== Overview ==
WCS is the only privately owned and operated facility in the United States that has been licensed to treat, store and dispose of Class A, B, C low level radioactive waste (LLRW), and to store Greater than Class C LLRW.

WCS’ facility in western Andrews County is the only commercial facility in the United States licensed in more than 30 years to dispose of Class A, B and C low-level radioactive waste. It is also licensed for the treatment and storage of low-level radioactive waste, and has served as a temporary storage facility for U.S. Department of Energy (DOE) projects.

The WCS facility also is the site of the disposal facility for the Texas Low Level Radioactive Waste Disposal Compact, and was the site of the storage and disposal of byproduct material from the DOE Fernald, Ohio cleanup site in 2009. In 2011 a vote was held by the Texas Low Level Radioactive Waste Disposal Compact Commission that will allow WCS to import waste from 36 other states across the US.

Disposal of low-level radioactive waste is in concrete containers buried 45 to 100 feet below the surface in concrete-lined cells in the red bed clay formations. Space between the containers is filled to help prevent shifting. As the cells are filled, they will be covered by more than 300 feet of liner material and red bed clay and the surface will be restored to its natural state.

The plant is located 5 miles east of Eunice, New Mexico, and 35 miles west of Andrews. The surrounding area on both sides of the state border, "nuclear alley", also includes:

- the National Enrichment Facility (owned and operated by the Urenco Group) in Eunice
- the deep geological repository Waste Isolation Pilot Plant (WIPP; managed by the United States Department of Energy), and
- the proposed first commercial uranium de-conversion facility in the United States, a project of International Isotopes, Inc.
