= Little Bird (Kasey Chambers song) =

Single by Kasey Chambers

from the album Little Bird
- Released: 20 August 2010
- Studio: Foggy Mountain
- Length: 3:30
- Label: Liberation
- Songwriter: Kasey Chambers
- Producers: Kasey Chambers and the Millionaires

Kasey Chambers singles chronology
"The Lost Music Blues" (2010)	"Little Bird" (2010)	"Beautiful Mess" (2011)

"Little Bird" is a country song written and performed by Kasey Chambers and released on 20 August 2010 as the lead single from Chambers' seventh studio album of the same name. The song was written about the trouble she had breaking into the industry.

At the APRA Music Awards of 2011, the song won Country Work of the Year and was nominated for Song of the Year.

At the Country Music Awards of Australia of 2011, the song won Song of the Year and Single of the Year. It was also nominated for Video Clip of the Year.

== Track listing ==
CD single (LMSP0112)

1. "Little Bird"
2. "Little Bird" (Acoustic)

== Charts ==
Weekly chart performance for "Little Bird"
Chart (2010)	Peak position
Australia (ARIA)	82
