= Little Bird (Misty Edwards album) =

Studio album by Misty Edwards
- Released: December 29, 2014
- Genre: Contemporary Christian music, indie rock
- Length: 45:04
- Label: Forerunner Music
- Producer: Brown Bannister, Paul Moak

Misty Edwards chronology
Only a Shadow (2013)	Little Bird (2014)

Little Bird is a studio album by Misty Edwards, released by Forerunner Music on December 29, 2014. Edwards worked with Brown Bannister and Paul Moak in the production of this album.

== Reception ==
Professional ratings
Review scores
Source	Rating
CCM Magazine	4/5 stars
The Christian Manifesto	2/5 stars
Christian Review Magazine	4/5 stars
CM Addict	3.5/5 stars
Cross Rhythms	8/10 squares
Indie Vision Music	3/5 stars
Jesus Freak Hideout	3.5/5 stars
New Release Tuesday	4.5/5 stars
Worship Leader	4.5/5 stars

Matt Conner, writing a four star review for CCM Magazine, says, "It's an intimate and thoughtful mix with nice surprise scattered throughout, the strongest of which is the title track." Specifying in a four and a half star review by Worship Leader, Andrea Hunter recognizes, "This kind of honest, confessional, spiritual and emotional excavation is the bedrock of indie music, but rarer in worship". Kevin Davis, indicating in a four and a half star review at New Release Tuesday, realizes, "the stirring vocals, prayerful lyrics and musical arrangements are breath-taking" Signaling in a three and a half star review from Jesus Freak Hideout, Jen Rose Yokel responds, "For the most part, Little Bird closes out the year on an elegant and quietly powerful note." Writing in an eight out of ten review, Stephen Curry at Cross Rhythms describes, "This album can be described as eclectic, introspective and experimental and although it does lack an element of cohesion, it makes up for it with beautiful melodies, thought provoking lyrics and one of Christendom's most recognisable voices." Ian Zandi, writes a three star review for Indie Vision Music, reports, "This is a solid album from Misty Edwards." Cal Moore, writes a two star review at The Christian Manifesto, responds, "its just a terrible release." Awarding the album three and a half stars, Andrew Funderburk says, "Little Bird remains rhythmically consistent from beginning to end". Christian St. John, rating the album four stars from Christian Review Magazine, writes, "Little Bird is a very different album that reveals a more creative, arty side to Misty Edwards with becoming self indulgent."

== Track listing ==
All tracks are written by Misty Edwards unless noted.

No.	Title	Writer(s)	Length
1.	"Womb of the Morning"		1:09
2.	"Invisible One"		5:49
3.	"Little Bird"		2:10
4.	"Companion"	Edwards, Natasha Gentry	5:27
5.	"Tightrope"	Edwards, Paul Moak	3:46
6.	"Audience of One"	Edwards, Moak	3:21
7.	"Killing Me with Mercy"		4:58
8.	"Sound of a Heart"		7:11
9.	"Summer Girl"		3:40
10.	"Mary, Mary"		3:01
11.	"Center of the Universe"		4:32
Total length:			45:04

== Charts ==
Chart (2015)	Peak position
US Christian Albums (Billboard)	7
US Independent Albums (Billboard)	23

== See also ==
- Misty Edwards discography
