= Andrews County, Texas =

County in Texas, United States

- County
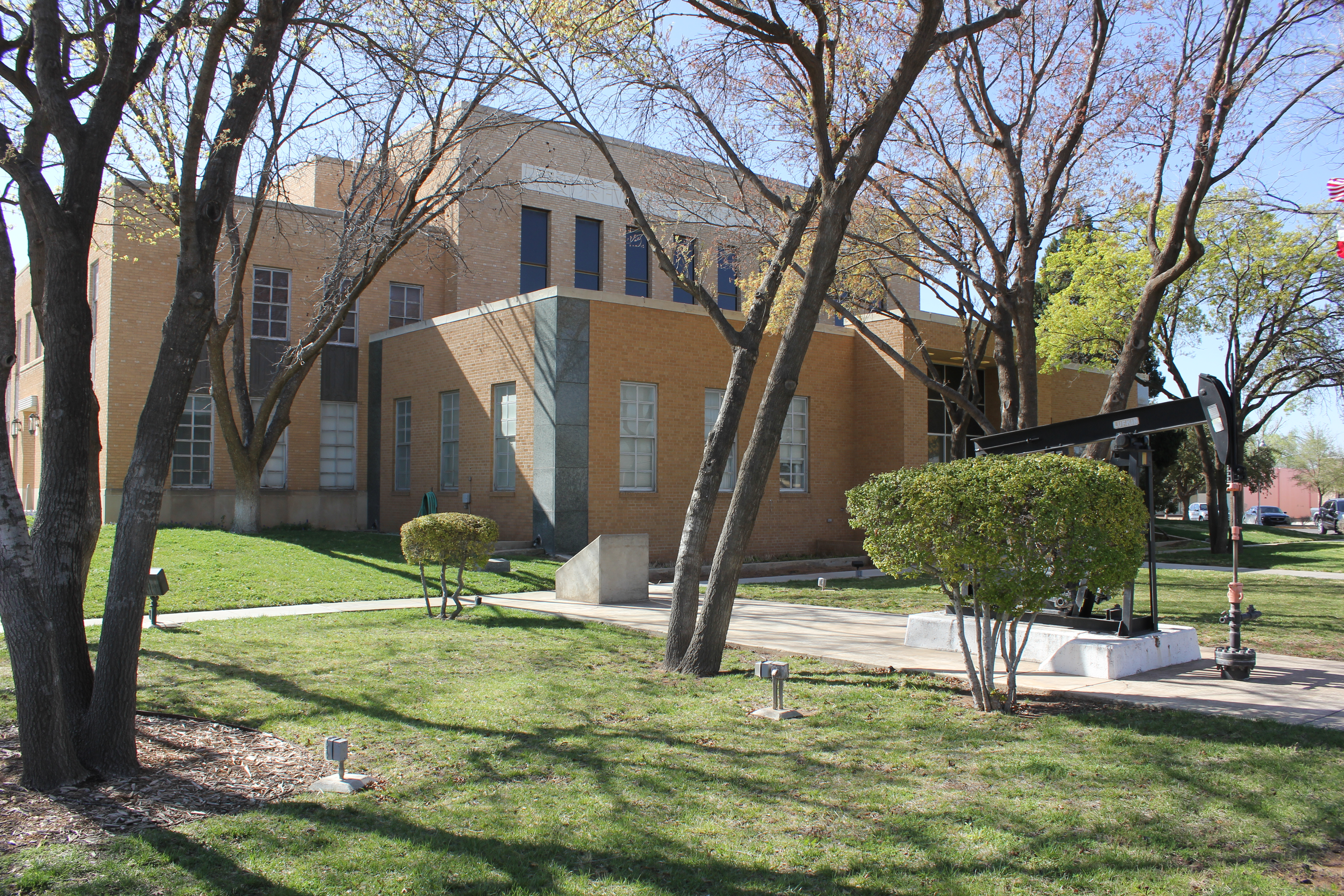
- Andrews County Courthouse in Andrews

- Location within the U.S. state of Texas
- Coordinates: 32°18′N 102°38′W
- Country: United States
- State: Texas
- Founded: 1910
- Named for: Richard Andrews
- Seat: Andrews
- Largest city: Andrews

Area
  - Total: 1,501 sq mi (3,890 km^{2})
  - Land: 1,501 sq mi (3,890 km^{2})
  - Water: 0.4 sq mi (1.0 km^{2}) 0.02%

Population (2020)
  - Total: 18,610
  - Estimate (2025): 18,914 ▲
  - Density: 12.40/sq mi (4.787/km^{2})
- Time zone: UTC−6 (Central)
  - Summer (DST): UTC−5 (CDT)
- Congressional district: 19th
- Website: www.co.andrews.tx.us

Andrews County is a county in the U.S. state of Texas. It is in West Texas and its county seat is Andrews.

As of the 2020 census, the population was 18,610. The Andrews Micropolitan Statistical Area includes all of Andrews County.

Andrews county was created August 21, 1876, from Tom Green County and organized in 1910. It is named for Richard Andrews, a soldier of the Texas Revolution.

== History ==
Along with the rest of Texas, Andrews County was:

- Part of the Viceroyalty of New Spain from August 18, 1521
- Part of an independent Mexico from September 27, 1821
- Part of the Republic of Texas from March 2, 1836
- Part of a state of the United States of America from December 29, 1845
- Part of the Confederate States of America from March 4, 1861
- Part of a state mandated to rejoin the Union of The United States of America on June 19, 1865, following the surrender of General Robert E. Lee and the Army of Northern Virginia of the Confederate States of America at Appomattox Courthouse, Virginia, that effectively ended the Civil War.
- Part of a state governed by provisional governors during nine years of reconstruction because of the state's insurrection during the Civil War.
- Part of a state whose people were allowed to vote on a new constitution and fully rejoin the Union of the United States of America, with elected representation in the U.S. Congress, by an act of President U.S.Grant, March 30, 1870.

In 1876, the Texas Legislature repealed the constitution of 1869 replacing it with the current constitution and established Andrews County.

== Geography ==
According to the U.S. Census Bureau, the county has an area of 1,501 square miles (3,890 km^{2}), of which essentially all is land although 0.4 square miles (1.0 km^{2}) (0.02%) are water. The county contains many playa lakes, the two largest being Baird lake and Shafter Lake.

In the west part of Andrews County on the border with New Mexico (see the state border issue below), a private company, Waste Control Specialists (WCS), formerly owned by the late Harold Simmons and headquartered in Dallas, Texas, operates a 14,000 acres (57 km^{2}) site. The company was awarded a license to dispose of radioactive waste by the TCEQ in 2009. The permit allows for disposal of radioactive materials such as uranium, plutonium and thorium from commercial power plants, academic institutions and medical schools. The company finished construction on the project in 2011 and began disposing of waste in 2012. There are two radioactive waste landfills at the site. The 30-acre compact site is owned and regulated by the State of Texas for use by Texas, Vermont, and up to 36 other states. The 90-acre federal site is owned by the United States federal government and is used for Department of Energy and other federal waste. The company employs 130 people or about 1% of the total labor force in Andrews and Andrews County.

For years, there has been a simmering dispute over which state these waste sites are lawfully a part of: Texas or New Mexico? The straight north–south border between the two states was originally defined as the 103rd meridian, but the 1859 survey that was supposed to mark that boundary mistakenly set the border between 2.29 and 3.77 miles too far west of that line, making the Waste Control Specialists waste sites, which are west of the 103rd meridian, along with the current towns of Farwell, Texline, and part of Glenrio, appear to be within the State of Texas. New Mexico's short border with Oklahoma, in contrast, was surveyed on the correct meridian. New Mexico's draft constitution in 1910 stated that the border is on the 103rd meridian as intended. The disputed strip, hundreds of miles long, includes parts of valuable oilfields of the Permian Basin. A bill was passed in the New Mexico Senate to fund and file a lawsuit in the U.S. Supreme Court to recover the strip from Texas, but the bill did not become law. Today, land in the strip is included in Texas land surveys and the waste sites for all purposes are taxed and governed by Andrews County and The State of Texas.

=== Major highways ===
- US 385
- SH 115
- SH 128
- SH 176
- Loop 1910
- FM 181
- FM 1218
- FM 1967
- FM 1788
- FM 2371

=== Adjacent counties ===
- Gaines County (north)
- Martin County (east)
- Midland County (southeast)
- Ector County (south)
- Winkler County (southwest)
- Lea County, New Mexico (west/Mountain Time Zone)

== Demographics ==
Historical population
Census	Pop.	Note	%±
1890	24		—
1900	87		262.5%
1910	975		1,020.7%
1920	350		−64.1%
1930	736		110.3%
1940	1,277		73.5%
1950	5,002		291.7%
1960	13,450		168.9%
1970	10,372		−22.9%
1980	13,323		28.5%
1990	14,338		7.6%
2000	13,004		−9.3%
2010	14,786		13.7%
2020	18,610		25.9%
2025 (est.)	18,914	▲	1.6%
U.S. Decennial Census; 1850–1900 1910; 1920 1930 1940; 1950 1960 1970; 1980 1990 2000; 2010 2020

=== 2020 census ===
As of the 2020 census, the county had a population of 18,610. The median age was 32.5 years. 30.4% of residents were under the age of 18 and 10.7% of residents were 65 years of age or older. For every 100 females there were 101.2 males, and for every 100 females age 18 and over there were 99.4 males age 18 and over.

The racial makeup of the county was 58.6% White, 1.3% Black or African American, 1.2% American Indian and Alaska Native, 0.6% Asian, <0.1% Native Hawaiian and Pacific Islander, 17.6% from some other race, and 20.7% from two or more races. Hispanic or Latino residents of any race comprised 55.9% of the population.

81.7% of residents lived in urban areas, while 18.3% lived in rural areas.

There were 6,262 households in the county, of which 43.6% had children under the age of 18 living in them. Of all households, 58.8% were married-couple households, 16.7% were households with a male householder and no spouse or partner present, and 18.7% were households with a female householder and no spouse or partner present. About 19.9% of all households were made up of individuals and 7.3% had someone living alone who was 65 years of age or older.

There were 7,020 housing units, of which 10.8% were vacant. Among occupied housing units, 74.0% were owner-occupied and 26.0% were renter-occupied. The homeowner vacancy rate was 1.9% and the rental vacancy rate was 13.5%.

=== Racial and ethnic composition ===
Andrews County, Texas – Racial and ethnic composition Note: the US Census treats Hispanic/Latino as an ethnic category. This table excludes Latinos from the racial categories and assigns them to a separate category. Hispanics/Latinos may be of any race.
Race / Ethnicity (NH = Non-Hispanic)	Pop 2000	Pop 2010	Pop 2020	% 2000	% 2010	% 2020
White alone (NH)	7,322	7,083	7,405	56.31%	47.90%	39.79%
Black or African American alone (NH)	195	199	192	1.50%	1.35%	1.03%
Native American or Alaska Native alone (NH)	64	95	96	0.49%	0.64%	0.52%
Asian alone (NH)	88	85	102	0.68%	0.57%	0.55%
Pacific Islander alone (NH)	2	1	0	0.02%	0.01%	0.00%
Other race alone (NH)	13	17	49	0.10%	0.11%	0.26%
Mixed race or Multiracial (NH)	118	111	366	0.91%	0.75%	1.97%
Hispanic or Latino (any race)	5,202	7,195	10,400	40.00%	48.66%	55.88%
Total	13,004	14,786	18,610	100.00%	100.00%	100.00%

=== 2010 census ===
As of the 2010 census, there were 14,786 people living in the county. 79.5% were White, 1.5% Black or African American, 1.0% Native American, 0.6% Asian, 15.5% of some other race and 2.0% of two or more races. 48.7% were Hispanic or Latino (of any race).

=== 2000 census ===
As of the 2000 census, there were 13,004 people, 4,601 households, and 3,519 families living in the county. The population density was 9 people per square mile (3.5 people/km^{2}). There were 5,400 housing units at an average density of 4 units per square mile (1.5/km^{2}). The racial makeup of the county was 77.08% White, 1.65% Black or African American, 0.88% Native American, 0.71% Asian, 0.02% Pacific Islander, 16.79% from other races, and 2.87% from two or more races. 40.00% of the population are Hispanic or Latino of any race.

There were 4,601 households, out of which 40.70% had children under the age of 18 living with them, 63.70% were married couples living together, 9.50% had a female householder with no husband present, and 23.50% were non-families. 21.80% of all households were made up of individuals, and 10.00% had someone living alone who was 65 years of age or older. The average household size was 2.81 and the average family size was 3.29.

In the county, the population was spread out, with 31.50% under the age of 18, 8.10% from 18 to 24, 27.30% from 25 to 44, 20.50% from 45 to 64, and 12.50% who were 65 years of age or older. The median age was 34 years. For every 100 females there were 96.30 males. For every 100 females age 18 and over, there were 91.20 males.

The median income for a household in the county was $34,036, and the median income for a family was $37,017. Males had a median income of $33,223 versus $21,846 for females. The per capita income for the county was $15,916. About 13.90% of families and 16.40% of the population were below the poverty line, including 20.20% of those under age 18 and 12.70% of those age 65 or over.

== Government and politics ==
United States presidential election results for Andrews County, Texas
Year	Republican		Democratic		Third party(ies)	
Year	No.	%	No.	%	No.	%
1912	1	1.22%	77	93.90%	4	4.88%
1916	0	0.00%	71	95.95%	3	4.05%
1920	9	10.84%	74	89.16%	0	0.00%
1924	7	9.86%	60	84.51%	4	5.63%
1928	66	72.53%	25	27.47%	0	0.00%
1932	6	3.11%	186	96.37%	1	0.52%
1936	18	5.88%	287	93.79%	1	0.33%
1940	26	5.58%	440	94.42%	0	0.00%
1944	48	11.88%	329	81.44%	27	6.68%
1948	101	10.55%	816	85.27%	40	4.18%
1952	805	46.56%	920	53.21%	4	0.23%
1956	1,131	53.53%	968	45.81%	14	0.66%
1960	1,550	45.47%	1,821	53.42%	38	1.11%
1964	1,442	40.22%	2,133	59.50%	10	0.28%
1968	1,400	38.53%	922	25.37%	1,312	36.10%
1972	2,615	79.00%	677	20.45%	18	0.54%
1976	2,127	54.03%	1,777	45.14%	33	0.84%
1980	2,800	69.77%	1,155	28.78%	58	1.45%
1984	3,918	82.48%	820	17.26%	12	0.25%
1988	3,052	72.82%	1,122	26.77%	17	0.41%
1992	2,266	53.60%	1,081	25.57%	881	20.84%
1996	2,360	58.99%	1,181	29.52%	460	11.50%
2000	3,091	76.81%	876	21.77%	57	1.42%
2004	3,837	84.59%	677	14.93%	22	0.49%
2008	3,816	82.44%	790	17.07%	23	0.50%
2012	3,639	81.19%	795	17.74%	48	1.07%
2016	3,927	79.45%	836	16.91%	180	3.64%
2020	4,943	84.31%	850	14.50%	70	1.19%
2024	5,205	85.89%	806	13.30%	49	0.81%

United States Senate election results for Andrews County, Texas1
Year	Republican		Democratic		Third party(ies)	
Year	No.	%	No.	%	No.	%
2024	4,976	83.32%	873	14.62%	123	2.06%

United States Senate election results for Andrews County, Texas2
Year	Republican		Democratic		Third party(ies)	
Year	No.	%	No.	%	No.	%
2020	4,894	84.38%	779	13.43%	127	2.19%

Texas Gubernatorial election results for Andrews County
Year	Republican		Democratic		Third party(ies)	
Year	No.	%	No.	%	No.	%
2022	3,302	86.24%	479	12.51%	48	1.25%

=== Commissioners Court ===
Under Texas state law, each county is governed by a commissioners court with one countywide elected judge and four precinct-level elected commissioners. Republicans currently hold all five seats on the Andrews County Commissioners Court.

Current composition of the Andrews County Commissioners Court
Precinct	Name	Affiliation	First elected
Judge	Sam Jones	Republican	2024
1	Kerry Pack	Republican	2016
2	Mark Savell	Republican	2018
3	Buddy Hobbs	Republican	2024
4	Jim Waldrop	Republican	2006

== Education ==
The Andrews Independent School District serves all of Andrews County.

The whole county is in the service area of Odessa College.

== Media ==
The county is served by a weekly newspaper, local stations KACT AM and KACT-FM, nearby stations KBXJ (FM) and KPET (AM), and the various Midland and Odessa radio and TV stations.

== Communities ==
=== City ===
- Andrews (county seat)

=== Census-designated place ===
- McKinney Acres

=== Unincorporated communities ===
- Florey
- Frankel City

=== Ghost towns ===
- Coyote Corner
- Fasken
- Old Place Windmills
- Shafter Lake
- Sixteen Corner Windmill
- Waldon Place Windmill

== See also ==
- Andrews County Veterans Memorial
- National Register of Historic Places listings in Andrews County, Texas
- Recorded Texas Historic Landmarks in Andrews County
