= Misty Edwards =

American contemporary Christian musician

- Born: Andrews, Texas
- Origin: Kansas City, Missouri
- Genres: CCM, worship, alternative rock, folk, folk rock, indie rock, rock
- Occupations: Singer, songwriter, worship leader
- Instruments: vocals, keyboard
- Years active: 2003–2024
- Label: Forerunner

Misty Edwards is an American contemporary Christian musician. Cross Rhythms has reviewed seven of her albums, 2003's Eternity, 2005's Always on His Mind, 2007's Relentless, 2009's Fling Wide, 2010's Point of Life, 2013's Only a Shadow, and 2014's Little Bird, while reviewing the extended play, 2011's Measure of Love, whereas Forerunner Music released these musical works. New Release Today has done five Behind the Song features on her songs. Edwards has seen five of her albums appear on the Billboard magazine charts, where they have achieved thirteen peak positions; the best was Only a Shadow, where it placed on the Billboard 200. The albums, Point of Love, Fling Wide, Only a Shadow, and Little Bird placed on the Christian Albums chart, while the extended play, Measure of Love, charted on it and the Heatseekers Albums chart, likewise, her previous albums placed on that chart, Point of Life and Fling Wide. There has been three placements on the Independent Albums chart, for, Fling Wide, Only a Shadow, and Little Bird.

== Early life ==
Edwards was born in Andrews, Texas, on January 19, 1979. She was exposed to music by her mother, a music teacher, The siblings were all homeschooled until, at the age of 19, Edwards became one of the first five interns at her church, International House of Prayer, when the church was founded near Kansas City, MO. She eventually became a worship leader at the church. "IHoP" has sustained a constant prayer/worship-meeting going at their "Prayer Room", allowing them to connect with thousands of people across the globe. Edwards initially had dreams of becoming a lawyer, but became a musician, as her home environment was hospitable and conducive for its development. In 1998, at the age of 19, Edwards was diagnosed with cancer. She had chemotherapy and radiation therapy and it took six years before it went fully into remission.

== Music career ==
Edwards' music recording career commenced with the release Eternity, a studio album, on December 5, 2003, by Forerunner Music. Forerunner Music released her second album, "Always on His Mind," on December 1, 2005. The subsequent album, "Relentless," was released on December 20, 2007, from Forerunner Music.

She released "Fling Wide" on December 28, 2009, with Forerunner Music. The album placed on three Billboard magazine charts, where it peaked at No. 21 on the Christian Albums, No. 46 on the Independent Albums, and No. 10 on the Heatseekers Albums chart.

Her next album, Point of Life, was released by Forerunner Music on April 6, 2010. This album saw placements on two Billboard magazine charts, where it peaked at No. 45 on the Christian Albums chart, and hitting a placement of No. 27 on the Heatseekers Albums.

She released an extended play with David Brymer, Measure of Love, and this was released on December 21, 2011, from Forerunner Music. The extended play charted on two Billboard magazine charts, with it placing on the Christian Albums at No. 24 and No. 16 on the Heatseekers Albums.

The follow-up album, Only a Shadow, was released on March 19, 2013, by Forerunner Music. The album placed on three Billboard magazine charts, the Billboard 200 at a peak of No. 107, while placing on the Christian Albums at No. 7, and Independent Albums at No. 21. She sat down with Kevin Davis in two Behind the Song features for New Release Today, where she discussed her songs "Shine Like the Stars" and "When You Think of Me" from this album.

She released her seventh album, Little Bird, with Forerunner Music, on December 29, 2014. This album charted on the Billboard magazine charts, where it placed at No. 7 on the Christian Albums chart, while peaking at No. 23 on the Independent Albums chart. Edwards talked to Kevin Davis about the song "Little Bird" from this album, in a Behind the Song feature at New Release Today. She was the subject in a podcast from Relevant Magazine, in the promotion of this album. This interview appeared in the Relevant Magazine issue 74 for March and April 2015, and published on their website.

Edwards, again in two more Behind the Song features with Kevin Davis from New Release Today, discussed her songs "The Gift" and "So Come."

== Kevin Prosch Controversy ==
On February 8, 2024, Misty Edwards was reported to have had an affair with musician Kevin Prosch, with charges filed, with ensuing conviction(s) for public intoxication and DUI arrests. Former International House of Prayer staff member Brent Steeno provided evidence of the affair and claimed International House of Prayer leadership retaliated against him for disclosing it. Initial reports included photographs from the arrest.

== Discography ==
List of studio albums, with selected chart positions
Title	Album details	Peak chart positions			
Title	Album details	US	US Christ	US Indie	US Heat
Eternity	Released: December 5, 2003; Label: Forerunner; CD, digital download	–	–	–	–
Always on His Mind	Released: December 1, 2005; Label: Forerunner; CD, digital download	–	–	–	–
Relentless	Released: December 20, 2007; Label: Forerunner; CD, digital download	–	–	–	–
Fling Wide	Released: December 28, 2009; Label: Forerunner; CD, digital download	–	21	46	10
Point of Life	Released: April 6, 2010; Label: Forerunner; CD, digital download	–	45	–	27
Measure of Love (with David Brymer)	Released: December 21, 2011; Label: Forerunner; CD, digital download	–	24	–	16
Only a Shadow	Released: March 19, 2013; Label: Forerunner; CD, digital download	107	7	21	–
Little Bird	Released: December 29, 2014; Label: Light; CD, digital download	–	7	23	–
