= Eunice, New Mexico =

- City
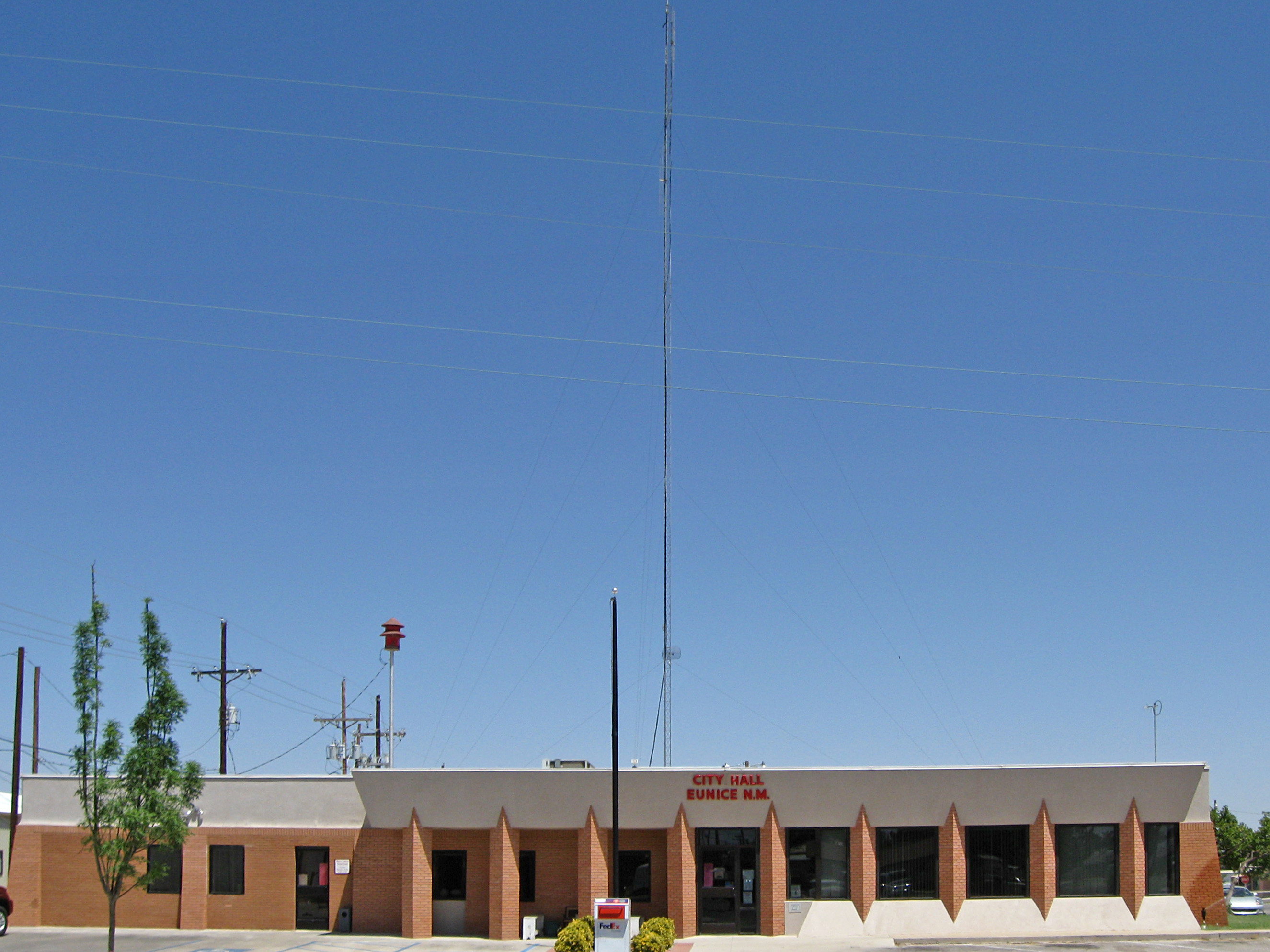
- Eunice City Hall

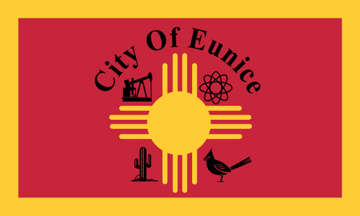
- Flag

- Location of Eunice, New Mexico

- Location in the United States
- Coordinates: 32°26′07″N 103°12′45″W
- Country: United States
- State: New Mexico
- County: Lea

Government
  - Mayor: Billy Hobbs

Area
  - Total: 4.10 sq mi (10.63 km^{2})
  - Land: 4.09 sq mi (10.60 km^{2})
  - Water: 0.0077 sq mi (0.02 km^{2})
- Elevation: 3,484 ft (1,062 m)

Population (2020)
  - Total: 3,056
  - Density: 746.4/sq mi (288.19/km^{2})
- Time zone: UTC-7 (Mountain (MST))
  - Summer (DST): UTC-6 (MDT)
- ZIP code: 88231
- Area code: 575
- FIPS code: 35-25450
- GNIS feature ID: 2410462
- Website: www.cityofeunice.org

Eunice is a city in Lea County, New Mexico, United States. The population was 3,056 at the 2020 census.

== Description ==
The mayor of Eunice, as of June 2026, is Jon Dean Davis.. A URENCO USA National Enrichment Facility, which uses Zippe-type centrifuge technology to enrich uranium, has been in operation 5 miles (8 km) east of Eunice since 2010.

== Geography ==
Eunice is located in southeastern Lea County. It is bypassed to the east by New Mexico State Road 18, which leads north 19 miles (31 km) to Hobbs, the largest city in the county, and south 23 miles (37 km) to Jal. State Road 176 runs east-west through the center of Eunice. Carlsbad is 68 miles (109 km) to the west, and the Texas border is 5.5 miles (8.9 km) to the east. Andrews, Texas, is 37 miles (60 km) east of Eunice via NM-176 and Texas State Highway 176.

According to the United States Census Bureau, Eunice has a total area of 3.9 square miles (10.2 km^{2}), of which 0.01 square miles (0.02 km^{2}), or 0.22%, are water.

== Demographics ==
Historical population
Census	Pop.	Note	%±
1940	1,227		—
1950	2,352		91.7%
1960	3,531		50.1%
1970	2,641		−25.2%
1980	2,970		12.5%
1990	2,676		−9.9%
2000	2,562		−4.3%
2010	2,922		14.1%
2020	3,056		4.6%
U.S. Decennial Census

=== 2020 census ===
As of the 2020 census, Eunice had a population of 3,056. The median age was 35.3 years. 28.8% of residents were under the age of 18 and 11.9% of residents were 65 years of age or older. For every 100 females there were 108.6 males, and for every 100 females age 18 and over there were 104.5 males age 18 and over.

0.0% of residents lived in urban areas, while 100.0% lived in rural areas.

There were 1,114 households in Eunice, of which 42.1% had children under the age of 18 living in them. Of all households, 52.3% were married-couple households, 20.8% were households with a male householder and no spouse or partner present, and 20.9% were households with a female householder and no spouse or partner present. About 22.9% of all households were made up of individuals and 8.0% had someone living alone who was 65 years of age or older.

There were 1,233 housing units, of which 9.7% were vacant. The homeowner vacancy rate was 0.4% and the rental vacancy rate was 13.5%.

Racial composition as of the 2020 census
Race	Number	Percent
White	1,776	58.1%
Black or African American	37	1.2%
American Indian and Alaska Native	27	0.9%
Asian	3	0.1%
Native Hawaiian and Other Pacific Islander	0	0.0%
Some other race	749	24.5%
Two or more races	464	15.2%
Hispanic or Latino (of any race)	1,670	54.6%

=== 2000 census ===
As of the census of 2000, there were 2,562 people, 942 households, and 709 families residing in the city. The population density was 877.5 inhabitants per square mile (338.8/km^{2}). There were 1,110 housing units at an average density of 380.2 per square mile (146.8/km^{2}). The racial makeup of the city was 71.00% White, 1.09% African American, 0.43% Native American, 0.12% Asian, 24.43% from other races, and 2.93% from two or more races. Hispanic or Latino of any race were 39.62% of the population.

There were 942 households, out of which 38.3% had children under the age of 18 living with them, 60.0% were married couples living together, 9.0% had a female householder with no husband present, and 24.7% were non-families. 22.9% of all households were made up of individuals, and 11.4% had someone living alone who was 65 years of age or older. The average household size was 2.72 and the average family size was 3.20.

In the city, the population was spread out, with 29.5% under the age of 18, 11.1% from 18 to 24, 27.2% from 25 to 44, 19.4% from 45 to 64, and 12.8% who were 65 years of age or older. The median age was 34 years. For every 100 females, there were 100.2 males. For every 100 females age 18 and over, there were 101.0 males.

The median income for a household in the city was $31,722, and the median income for a family was $38,808. Males had a median income of $30,216 versus $21,400 for females. The per capita income for the city was $14,373. About 14.2% of families and 15.6% of the population were below the poverty line, including 18.4% of those under age 18 and 10.1% of those age 65 or over.

== Infrastructure ==
=== Highways ===
- NM 18
- NM 23
- NM 176
- NM 207
- NM 234

=== Railroad ===
The Texas & New Mexico Railway provides freight service.

== Education ==
The school district is Eunice Municipal Schools.

== Sports ==
Eunice high school baseball has produced 17 state championships. This record ranks fifth in the nation.

Eunice is the childhood home of College Football Coach Josh Lynn and retired CFL offensive lineman and placekicker Jack Abendschan, a member of the Canadian Football Hall of Fame.

== See also ==
- List of municipalities in New Mexico
