= Battle of Goliad =

Second skirmish of the Texas Revolution

Coordinates: 28°38′48″N 97°22′54″W

- Part of the Texas Revolution
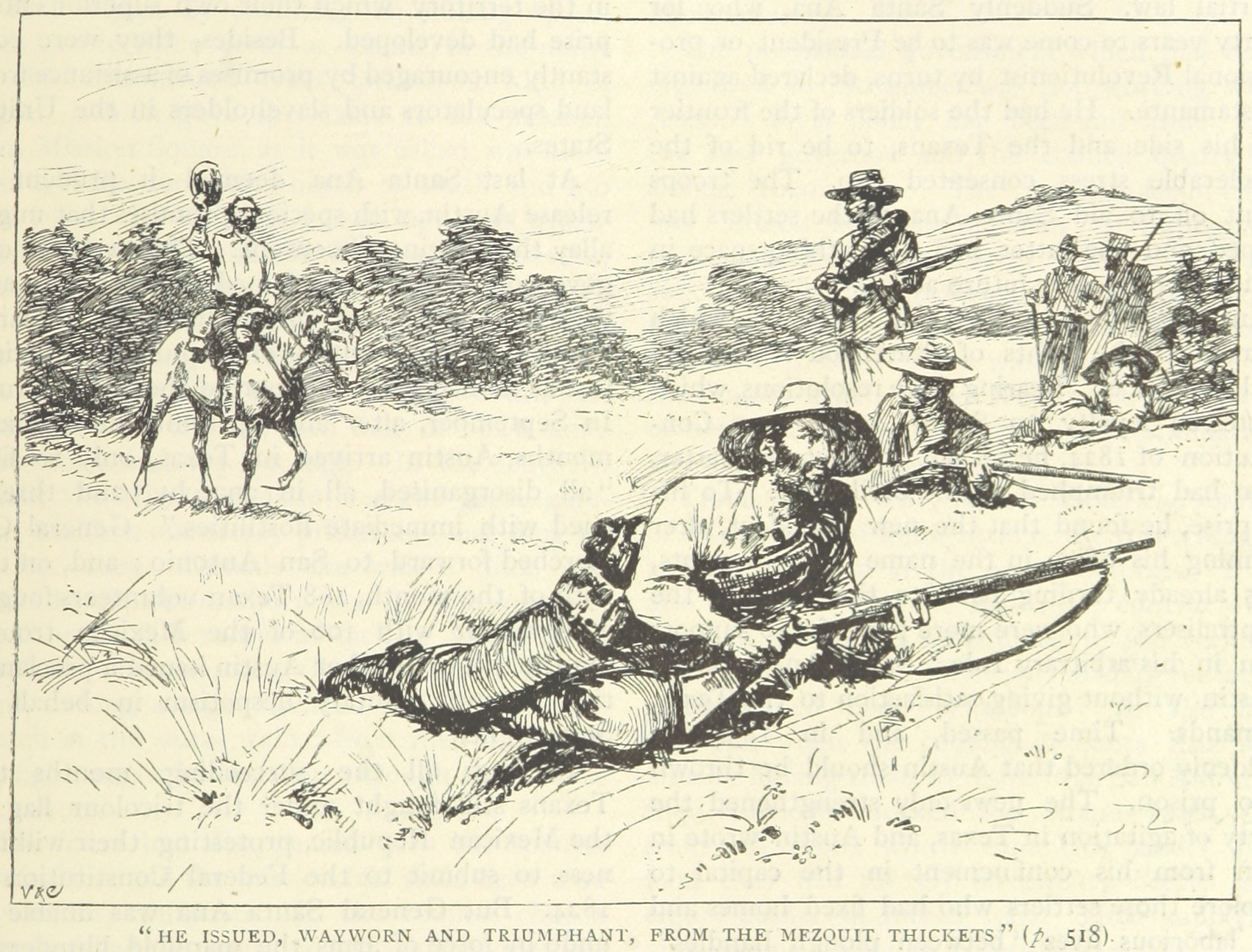
- Benjamin Milam leads the Texian soldiers fighting in the Battle of Goliad
Date	October 10, 1835
Location	Presidio La Bahía, Goliad
Result	Texian victory

Belligerents
Texian Rebels	Centralist Republic of Mexico

Commanders and leaders
James Fannin; Philip Dimmitt; John Lin; George Collinsworth; Benjamin Milam	Juan López Sandoval (surrendered); Martín Perfecto de Cos

Strength
125 militia	50 infantry

Casualties and losses
1 wounded	1–3 killed 3–7 wounded

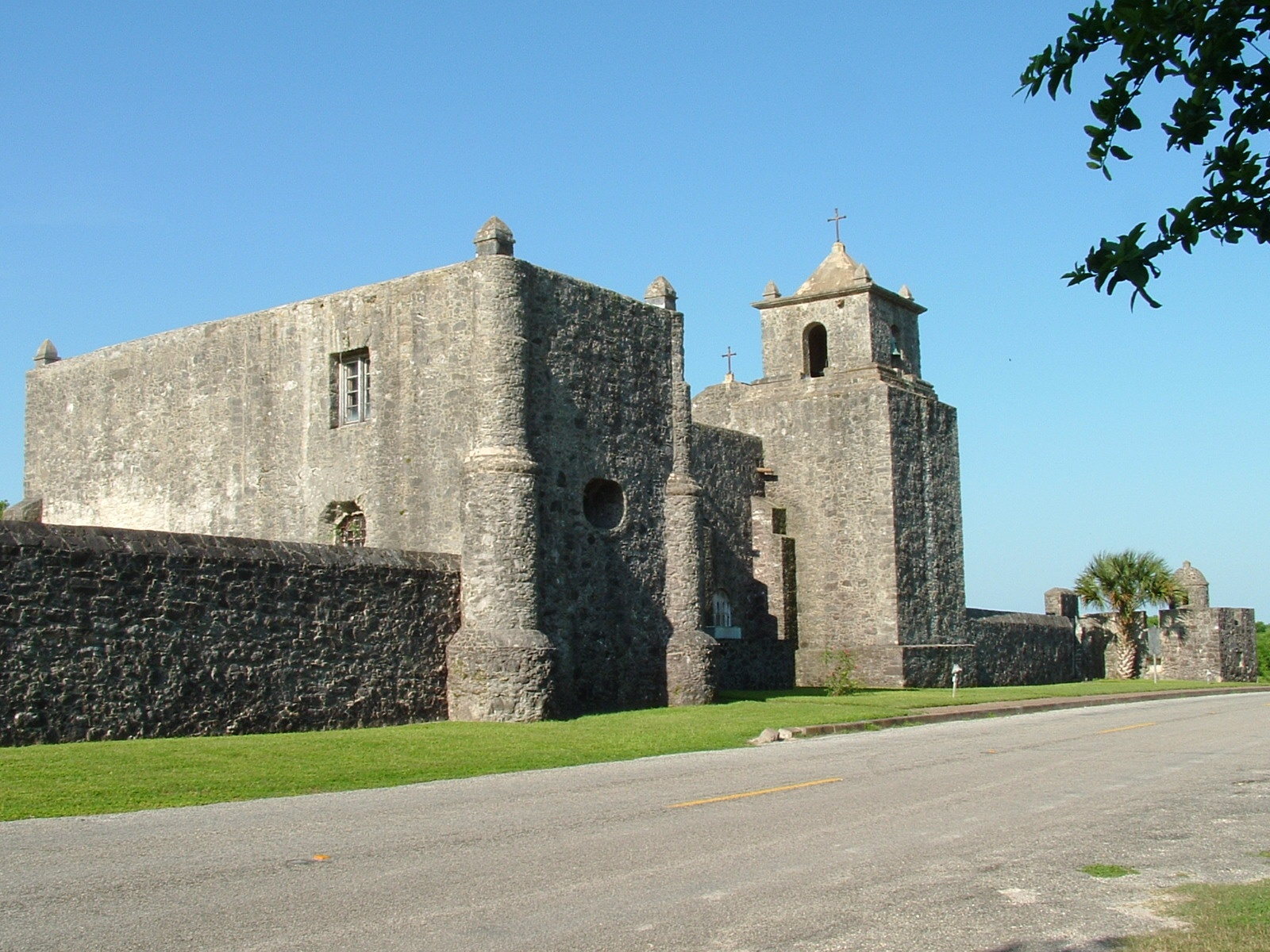
Presidio La Bahía where Texas settlers attacked the Mexican Army garrisoned there

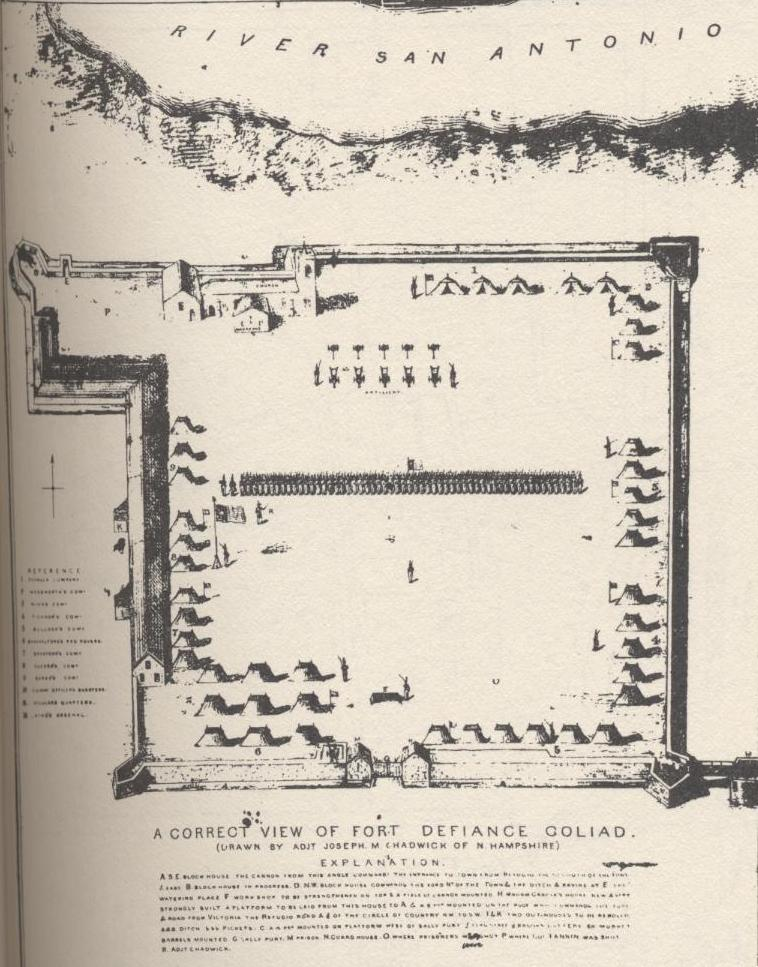
This map of the Presidio La Bahía was drawn in 1836.

The Battle of Goliad was the second skirmish of the Texas Revolution. In the early-morning hours of October 9, 1835, Texas settlers attacked the Mexican Army soldiers garrisoned at Presidio La Bahía, a fort near the Mexican Texas settlement of Goliad. La Bahía lay halfway between the only other large garrison of Mexican soldiers (at Presidio San Antonio de Béxar) and the then-important Texas port of Copano.

In September, Texians began plotting to kidnap Mexican General Martín Perfecto de Cos, who was en route to Goliad to attempt to quell the unrest in Texas. The plan was initially dismissed by the central committee coordinating the rebellion. However, within days of the Texian victory at the Battle of Gonzales, Captain George Collinsworth and members of the Texian militia in Matagorda began marching towards Goliad. The Texians soon learned that Cos and his men had already departed for San Antonio de Béxar but continued their march.

The garrison at La Bahía was understaffed and could not mount an effective defense of the fort's perimeter. Using axes borrowed from townspeople, Texians were able to chop through a door and enter the complex before the bulk of the soldiers were aware of their presence. After a half an hour battle, the Mexican garrison, under Colonel Juan López Sandoval, surrendered. One Mexican soldier had been killed and three others wounded, while only one Texian, Samuel McCulloch Jr. had been injured. The majority of the Mexican soldiers were instructed to leave Texas, and the Texians confiscated $10,000 worth of provisions and several cannons, which they soon transported to the Texian Army for use in the siege of Béxar. The victory isolated Cos's men in Béxar from the coast, forcing them to rely on a long overland march to request or receive reinforcements or supplies.

== Background ==
In 1835, Mexico operated two major garrisons within its Texas territory, the Alamo at San Antonio de Béxar and Presidio La Bahía near Goliad. Béxar was the political center of Texas, and Goliad laid halfway between it and the major Texas port of Copano. Military and civilian supplies and military personnel were usually sent by sea from the Mexican interior to Copano Bay and then could be transported overland to the Texas settlements.

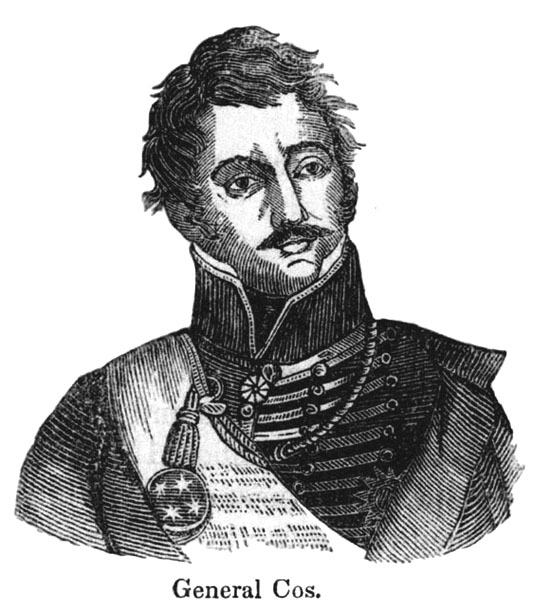
General Martín Perfecto de Cos

In early 1835, as the Mexican government transitioned from a federalist model to centralism, wary colonists in Texas began forming Committees of Correspondence and Safety. A central committee in San Felipe de Austin coordinated their activities. The Texians staged a minor revolt against customs duties in June; these Anahuac Disturbances prompted Mexican President Antonio López de Santa Anna to send additional troops to Texas. In July, Colonel Nicolas Condelle, led 200 men to reinforce Presidio La Bahía. The following month, a contingent of soldiers arrived in Béxar with Colonel Domingo de Ugartechea. Fearing that stronger measures were needed to quell the unrest, Santa Anna ordered his brother-in-law, General Martín Perfecto de Cos to "repress with strong arm all those who, forgetting their duties to the nation which has adopted them as her children, are pushing forward with a desire to live at their own option without subjection to the laws". Cos landed at Copano Bay on September 20 with approximately 500 soldiers. Cos briefly toured the port at Copano Bay and the small garrison at nearby Refugio and left small groups of soldiers to reinforce each of these locations. The main body of soldiers arrived in Goliad on October 2.

Unbeknownst to Cos, as early as September 18, several Texians, including James Fannin, Philip Dimmitt, and John Lin, had independently begun advocating a plan to seize Cos at either Copano or Goliad. As soon as Cos's warships were spotted approaching Copano Bay, Refugio colonists sent messengers to San Felipe de Austin and Matagorda to inform the other settlements of Cos's imminent arrival. Concerned that a lack of artillery would make the presidio at Goliad impossible to capture, the central committee chose not to order an assault.

Although Fannin, Dimmitt, and Linn continued to push for an attack on Goliad, Texian attention soon shifted towards Gonzales, where a small group of Texians were refusing to obey orders from Ugartechea. Colonists eagerly rushed to assist, and on October 2 the Battle of Gonzales officially opened the Texas Revolution. After learning of the Texian victory, Cos made haste for Béxar. He left with the bulk of his soldiers on October 5, but because he was unable to find adequate transportation most of his supplies remained at La Bahía.

== Prelude ==
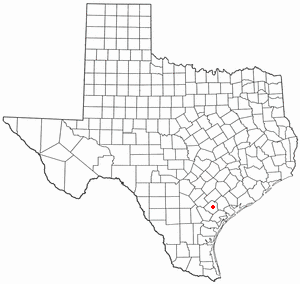
This map marks the location of Goliad in Texas. The battle took place near the town.

On October 6, members of the Texian militia in Matagorda convened at the home of Sylvanus Hatch. As their first order of business they elected George Collinsworth as their captain; Dr. William Carleton was then named first lieutenant and D.C. Collinsworth became the unit's second lieutenant. After appointing their leaders, the men decided to march on La Bahía. They intended to kidnap Cos and, if possible, steal the estimated $50,000 that was rumored to accompany him. The Texians sent messengers to alert nearby settlements of their quest. By afternoon, 50 Texians were ready to march from Matagorda. During the march, for unknown reasons the men fired Carleton and appointed James W. Moore as the new first lieutenant.

The following day the expedition stopped at Victoria, where they were soon joined by English-speaking settlers from other settlements and 30 Tejanos led by Plácido Benavides. Although no accurate muster rolls were kept, historian Stephen Hardin estimated that the Texian ranks swelled to 125 men. Forty-nine of them signed a "Compact of Volunteers under Collinsworth" on October 9. These men pledged that they were loyal to the Mexican federal government and would harm no one who remained loyal to the federalist cause.

One of the new arrivals, merchant Philip Dimmitt, received a missive from the Goliad customs agent with news that Cos and his war chest had already departed La Bahía to travel to San Antonio de Béxar. Undeterred, the group marched out on October 9. Ira Ingram led the vanguard, which halted 1 mile (1.6 km) outside Goliad. The events that follow are not very clear. According to the memoirs of Mexican General Vicente Filisola, who was not in Texas in 1835, the Texians plotted to draw the presidio commander, Colonel Juan López Sandoval, and his officers from the fort. The Texians allegedly planned a dance in Goliad on October 9 and invited the Mexican officers. Although Sandoval, Captain Manuel Sabriego, and Lieutenant Jesus de la Garza briefly attended the dance, they suspected mischief and returned to the fort. No Texian source mentions such a plot. Several of the Texians, including Dimmitt, did enter the town that evening to try to find guides and support for the effort. Dimmitt's efforts were successful, and several of the Tejanos who lived near Goliad joined the Texian force. They reported that Sandoval commanded only 50 men—far fewer than the number necessary to defend the entire perimeter of the fort—and provided directions to the fort.

The main body of Texian soldiers, under Collinsworth, became disoriented in the dark and wandered from the road. They were soon tangled in a mesquite thicket. While working their way back towards the road, the Texians met Ben Milam, a Texas colonist who had recently escaped from prison in Monterrey. Milam joined the militia as a private, and the group soon rejoined the vanguard.

== Battle ==
As the combined Texian force prepared for battle, they sent a messenger to instruct the alcalde of the city to surrender. At 11 pm, the alcade responded that the town would remain neutral, neither surrendering nor fighting. Several of the locals did, however, supply axes to the Texian militia. The Texians divided themselves into four groups, each assigned a different approach to the presidio. In the pre-dawn hours of October 10, the Texians attacked. The lone sentinel managed to give the alarm but was immediately shot dead. The Texians quickly hacked through a door on the north wall of the fortress and ran to the interior courtyard. Hearing the commotion, the Mexican soldiers had lined the walls to defend the fort.

The Mexican soldiers opened fire, hitting Samuel McCulloch Jr., a former slave whom George Collinsworth had freed, in the shoulder. Texians returned fire for approximately 30 minutes. During a pause in the fighting, a Texian spokesman yelled out that they would "massacre everyone of you, unless you come out immediately and surrender". The Mexican garrison immediately surrendered.

== Aftermath ==
McCulloch was the only Texian soldier to be wounded, and he later claimed to be the "first whose blood was shed in the Texas War for Independence". This distinction earned him a permanent home; a later law prohibited any freed slave from residing in the Republic of Texas, but in 1840 the Texas legislature specifically excluded McCulloch, his family, and his descendants from its enforcement. The exclusion was reward for McCulloch's service and his injury.

Estimates of Mexican casualties range from one to three soldiers killed and from three to seven wounded. Approximately 20 soldiers escaped. They warned the garrisons at Copano and Refugio of the advancing Texians; those garrisons abandoned their posts and joined the soldiers at Fort Lipantitlán. Milam escorted the remaining Mexican soldiers to Gonzales, where the newly formed Texian Army was located. The Texian Army commander, Stephen F. Austin, later released all of the men, on the condition that they leave Texas and vow to stop fighting Texas residents. One wounded Mexican soldier was allowed to remain in Goliad, as was Captain Manuel Sabriego, who was married to a local woman. In secret, Sabriego began organizing a group of settlers in the Goliad area who sympathized with Mexico.

Texian troops confiscated the provisions they found at the fort. Although they found 300 muskets, most of them were broken and unable to be repaired. Dimmitt hired two gunsmiths who were able to bring the remaining weapons into service. The food, clothing, blankets, and other provisions were valued at US$10,000. The new quartermaster at the fort, John J. Linn, reported that 175 barrels of flour were confiscated, along with a large supply of sugar, coffee, whiskey, and rum. For the next three months, the provisions were parceled out among companies in the Texian Army. The Texians also gained control of several cannons.

Over the next several days, more and more Texian settlers joined the group at La Bahía. Many of them were from Refugio, a sprawling settlement that was furthest from Matagorda. Historian Hobart Huson speculates that these men were the last to receive word of the planned attack. Austin ordered that 100 men remain at Goliad, under the command of Dimmitt, while the rest should join the Texian Army in marching on Cos's troops in Béxar. Collinsworth returned to Matagorda to recruit additional soldiers, but on October 14 the remaining Texians at Goliad began the march towards Béxar.

The loss of Goliad meant that Cos lost his means of communicating with Copano Bay, the closest port to Béxar. The Mexican troops garrisoned at Béxar would now need to get supplies and reinforcements overland.

== See also ==
- List of Texas Revolution battles
- Timeline of the Texas Revolution
