= New Mexico State Road 207 =

State highway in New Mexico, United States

State Road 207
- NM 207 highlighted in red

Route information
- Maintained by NMDOT
- Length: 5.925 mi (9.535 km)

Major junctions
- South end: NM 18 near Eunice
- North end: NM 176 in Eunice

Location
- Country: United States
- State: New Mexico
- Counties: Lea

Highway system
- New Mexico State Highway System; Interstate; US; State; Scenic
← NM 206	→ NM 208

State Road 207 (NM 207) is a 5.925-mile-long (9.535 km) state highway in the US state of New Mexico. NM 207's southern terminus is at NM 18 south of Eunice, and the northern terminus is at NM 176 in Eunice.

== Major intersections ==
The entire route is in Lea County.

Location	mi	km	Destinations	Notes
	0.000	0.000	NM 18	Southern terminus
Eunice	5.925	9.535	NM 176	Northern terminus
1.000 mi = 1.609 km; 1.000 km = 0.621 mi
