= George Morse Collinsworth =

American politician and military officer (1810–1866)

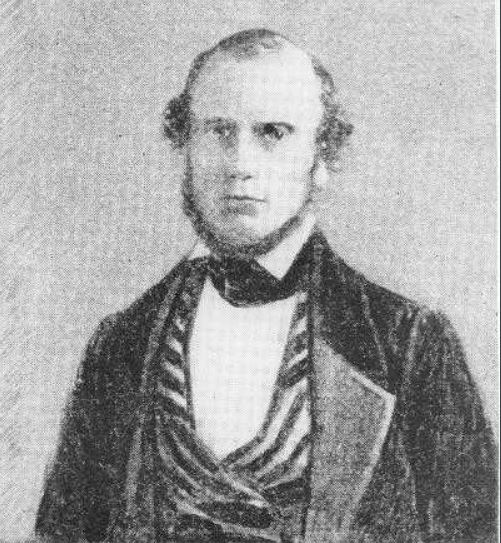
- Born: 1810; Mississippi, US
- Died: April 18, 1866 (aged 55–56) Matagorda County, Texas, US
- Allegiance: Republic of Texas
- Branch: Texas Army
- Rank: Captain
- Battles: Texas Revolution; Battle of Velasco; Battle of Goliad

George Morse Collinsworth (erroneously Collingsworth; 1810 – April 18, 1866) was an American politician and military officer. He served in the Texas Revolution and commanded the capture of Goliad, afterwards holding several Texas municipal offices.

== Biography ==
Collinsworth was born in 1810, in Mississippi, and was of Irish and Scottish ancestry. He moved to Texas in 1831, and later lived in Brazoria, Texas, In June 1832, he participated in the Battle of Velasco, and July of the same year, he was secretary of the Brazoria Committee of Vigilance. He worked as a planter.

In early October 1835, Collinsworth and fellow officer Benjamin Milam organized a milita, composed of farmers along the lower ends of the Colorado River. On October 9, the men captured a Mexican garrison in Goliad. As a result of their victory, the Mexican-controlled San Antonio was isolated from ports on the Gulf of Mexico. Between October 10 and 17, he left Goliad alone, in search of either more troops or supplies, and was succeeded by Philip Dimmitt as commander. Dimmitt was received negatively, and on November 18, Stephen F. Austin requested he return his role to Collinsworth, with the state government giving him back the role on November 28. Dimmitt would go on to sign the Goliad Declaration of Independence and attempt secession.

On December 11, 1835, Collinsworth was made customs collector of the ports in Matagorda. He retired from the military on January 4, 1836, receiving 320 acres of land on January 12 as payment for his service. On May 22 of the same year, he was nominated to again become collector of the ports of Matagorda. On February 3, 1840, he became Matagorda County land commissioner. On January 22, 1841, he was made revenue collector of the ports in Calhoun County, then on March 27, was made Matagorda County justice of the peace. He was made customs collector of Aransas County on February 9, 1845. In 1857, he was surveyor of Karnes County.

On June 5, 1837, Collinsworth married Susan R. Kendrick; they had three children together. He died on April 18, 1866, aged 55 or 56, from tuberculosis, in Matagorda County. He was buried at the Matagorda Cemetery. In 1936, the Texas government erected a commemorative plaque in Matagorda regarding him.
