= Andrews Independent School District =

School district in Texas

Location
- 405 NW 3rd St. Andrews, Texas ESC Region 18 United States
- Coordinates: 32°19′17″N 102°33′6″W

District information
- Type: Public independent school district
- Motto: Where the Child Comes First
- Grades: EE through 12
- Superintendent: Bobby Azam
- Schools: 6 (2020-21)
- NCES District ID: 4808280

Students and staff
- Students: 4359 (2020-21)
- Teachers: 279 (2020-21) (on full-time equivalent (FTE) basis)
- Student–teacher ratio: 15.62 (2020-21)
- Athletic conference: UIL Class 4A Football & Basketball
- District mascot: Mustangs
- Colors: Black, Gold

Other information
- Website: www.andrews.esc18.net

Andrews Independent School District is a school district headquartered in Andrews, Texas, United States. Andrews ISD, which serves all of the city of Andrews and all of Andrews County, is served by the Educational Service Center Region 18.

== Schools ==
The district has students in five schools, all located in Andrews.

High schools

- Andrews High School (Grades 9-12)

Middle schools

- Andrews Middle School (Grades 6-8)

Elementary schools

- Clearfork Elementary (Grades EE-1)
- Devonian Elementary (Grades 2-3)
- Underwood Elementary (Grades 4-5)

The district alternative education school is Andrews Education Center (Grades 9-12)

== Additional features ==
Andrews High School has a large capacity football stadium named Mustang Bowl. In 2018 the district passed a bond resolution to finance renovations and expansion for all the schools in the district.

== See also ==
- List of school districts in Texas
- List of high schools in Texas
