= Andrews, Texas =

- City
- City of Andrews
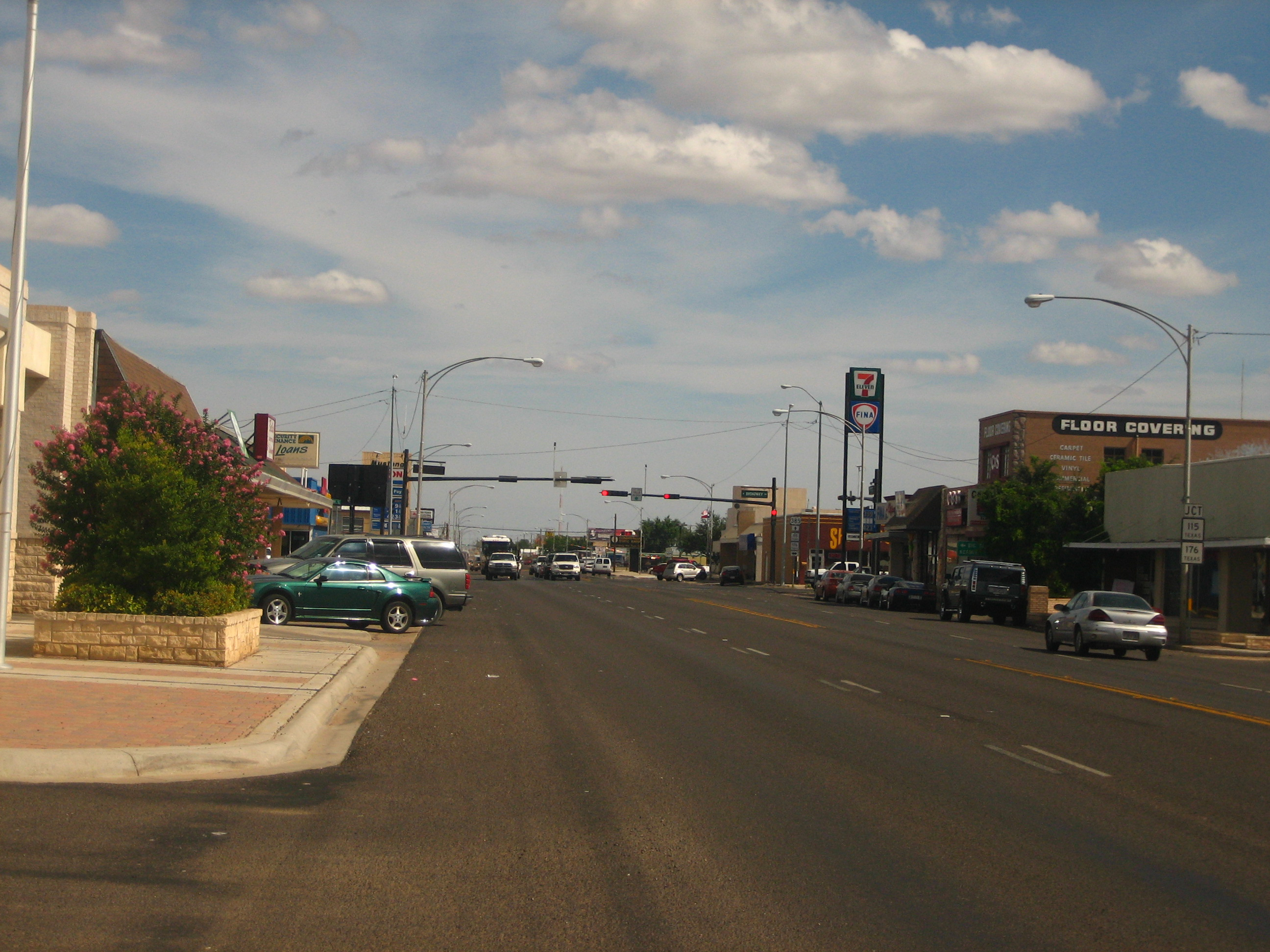
- Downtown Andrews

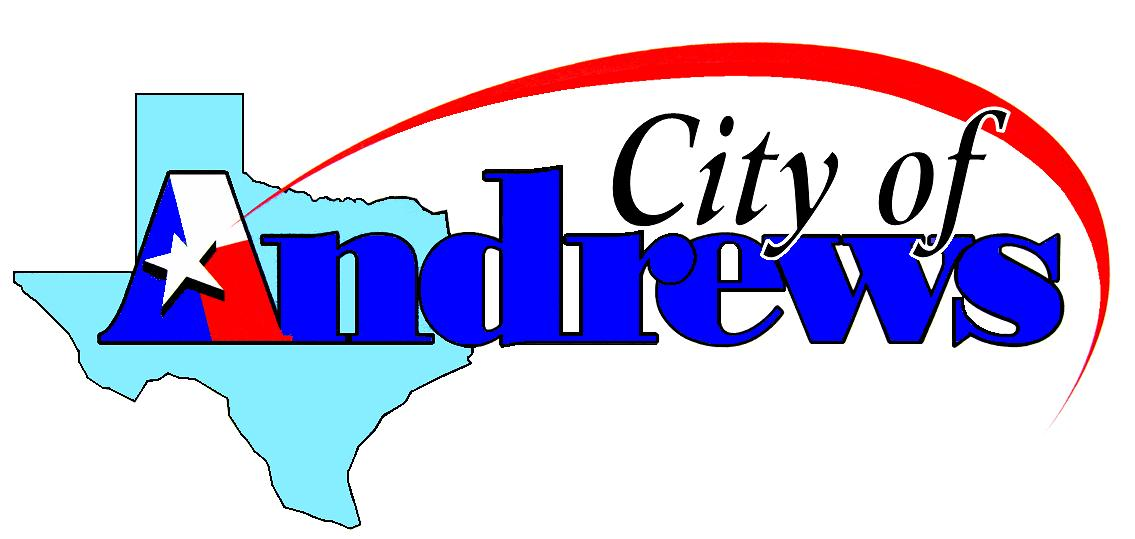
- Seal
- Motto: "Move Ahead"
- Interactive map of Andrews, Texas
- Coordinates: 32°19′17″N 102°33′6″W
- Country: United States
- State: Texas
- County: Andrews
- Established: 1937
- Named for: Richard Andrews

Government Council-Manager
  - Type: Elected(non-compensatory)Mayor-Council/ appointed City Manager
  - City Manager: Steve Eggleston
  - Mayor: Jason Harper

Area
  - Total: 6.96 sq mi (18.03 km^{2})
  - Land: 6.95 sq mi (18.00 km^{2})
  - Water: 0.012 sq mi (0.03 km^{2})
- Elevation: 3,176 ft (968 m)

Population (2020)
  - Total: 13,487
  - Estimate (2022): 13,276
  - Density: 1,941/sq mi (749.3/km^{2})
- Demonym: Andrewsite
- Time zone: UTC-6 (Central (CST))
  - Summer (DST): UTC-5 (CDT)
- ZIP code: 79714
- Area code: 432
- FIPS code: 48-03216
- GNIS feature ID: 1329539
- Website: cityofandrews.org

Andrews is a city in and the county seat of Andrews County in the Permian Basin of West Texas. Andrews sits to the far southwest within the Texas Panhandle's plains, about 30 miles east of New Mexico.

Andrews was incorporated on February 2, 1937. Both the city and county were named for Richard Andrews, the first Texan soldier to die in the Texas Revolution.

The population was 13,487 as of 2020.

== Geography ==
The city has a total area of 6.9 square miles (18 km^{2}), all land.

=== Climate ===
According to the Köppen climate classification, Andrews has a semiarid climate, BSk on climate maps. The hottest temperature recorded in Andrews was 113 °F (45.0 °C) on June 27, 1994, while the coldest temperature recorded was −1 °F (−18.3 °C) on February 2, 1985.

Climate data for Andrews, Texas, 1991–2020 normals, extremes 1962–2010
Month	Jan	Feb	Mar	Apr	May	Jun	Jul	Aug	Sep	Oct	Nov	Dec	Year
Record high °F (°C)	85 (29)	89 (32)	97 (36)	99 (37)	107 (42)	113 (45)	111 (44)	106 (41)	104 (40)	101 (38)	93 (34)	81 (27)	113 (45)
Mean daily maximum °F (°C)	59.5 (15.3)	64.8 (18.2)	72.5 (22.5)	81.7 (27.6)	88.9 (31.6)	95.3 (35.2)	95.6 (35.3)	94.7 (34.8)	88.4 (31.3)	79.9 (26.6)	68.2 (20.1)	60.1 (15.6)	79.1 (26.2)
Daily mean °F (°C)	45.4 (7.4)	50.0 (10.0)	57.3 (14.1)	65.5 (18.6)	74.3 (23.5)	81.2 (27.3)	82.5 (28.1)	81.7 (27.6)	75.1 (23.9)	65.8 (18.8)	53.8 (12.1)	46.2 (7.9)	64.9 (18.3)
Mean daily minimum °F (°C)	31.3 (−0.4)	35.3 (1.8)	42.1 (5.6)	49.3 (9.6)	59.7 (15.4)	67.1 (19.5)	69.3 (20.7)	68.6 (20.3)	61.8 (16.6)	51.6 (10.9)	39.4 (4.1)	32.3 (0.2)	50.6 (10.4)
Record low °F (°C)	0 (−18)	−1 (−18)	8 (−13)	23 (−5)	33 (1)	47 (8)	57 (14)	53 (12)	38 (3)	22 (−6)	11 (−12)	1 (−17)	−1 (−18)
Average precipitation inches (mm)	0.63 (16)	0.62 (16)	0.72 (18)	0.56 (14)	1.32 (34)	2.38 (60)	1.71 (43)	1.55 (39)	1.93 (49)	1.31 (33)	0.55 (14)	0.69 (18)	13.97 (354)
Average snowfall inches (cm)	0.9 (2.3)	0.1 (0.25)	0.0 (0.0)	0.0 (0.0)	0.0 (0.0)	0.0 (0.0)	0.0 (0.0)	0.0 (0.0)	0.0 (0.0)	0.0 (0.0)	0.0 (0.0)	0.7 (1.8)	1.7 (4.35)
Average precipitation days (≥ 0.01 in)	2.5	2.9	2.9	2.1	3.8	4.0	3.8	4.3	4.0	4.0	2.5	2.1	38.9
Average snowy days (≥ 0.1 in)	0.5	0.2	0.1	0.0	0.0	0.0	0.0	0.0	0.0	0.0	0.1	0.4	1.3
Source 1: NOAA
Source 2: National Weather Service

== Demographics ==
Historical population
Census	Pop.	Note	%±
1940	611		—
1950	3,294		439.1%
1960	11,135		238.0%
1970	8,625		−22.5%
1980	11,061		28.2%
1990	10,678		−3.5%
2000	9,652		−9.6%
2010	11,088		14.9%
2020	13,487		21.6%
2022 (est.)	13,276		−1.6%
U.S. Decennial Census

=== 2020 census ===
As of the 2020 census, Andrews had a population of 13,487 residents and a median age of 32.1 years; 30.1% of residents were under the age of 18 and 11.0% were 65 years of age or older. For every 100 females there were 99.0 males, and among residents age 18 and over there were 97.1 males per 100 females.

99.7% of residents lived in urban areas, while 0.3% lived in rural areas.

There were 4,616 households in Andrews, of which 42.5% had children under the age of 18 living in them. Of all households, 55.6% were married-couple households, 17.1% were households with a male householder and no spouse or partner present, and 21.1% were households with a female householder and no spouse or partner present. About 21.8% of all households were made up of individuals and 7.9% had someone living alone who was 65 years of age or older.

There were 5,161 housing units, of which 10.6% were vacant. Among occupied housing units, 70.1% were owner-occupied and 29.9% were renter-occupied. The homeowner vacancy rate was 2.1% and the rental vacancy rate was 13.8%.

Racial composition as of the 2020 census
Race	Percent
White	58.2%
Black or African American	1.5%
American Indian and Alaska Native	1.4%
Asian	0.7%
Native Hawaiian and Other Pacific Islander	0%
Some other race	18.3%
Two or more races	19.8%
Hispanic or Latino (of any race)	57.1%

=== 2000 census ===
As of the census of 2000, 9,652 people, 3,478 households, and 2,598 were families residing in the city. The population density was 2,017.5 inhabitants per square mile (779.0/km^{2}). The 4,047 housing units averaged 845.9 per square mile (326.9/km^{2}). The racial makeup of the city was 75.65% White, 2.04% African American, 0.90% Native American, 0.71% Asian, 17.75% from other races, and 2.94% from two or more races. Hispanics or Latinos of any race were 41.95% of the population.

Of the 3,478 households, 40.3% had children under the age of 18 living with them, 61.3% were married couples living together, 10.2% had a female householder with no husband present, and 25.3% were not families. About 23.7% of all households were made up of individuals, and 11.1% had someone living alone who was 65 years of age or older. The average household size was 2.75, and the average family size was 3.26.

In the city, the age distribution was 31.5% under 18, 8.1% from 18 to 24, 27.3% from 25 to 44, 20.0% from 45 to 64, and 13.1% who were 65 or older. The median age was 34 years. For every 100 females, there were 93.9 males. For every 100 females age 18 and over, there were 88.6 males.

The median income for a household in the city was $32,774, and for a family was $36,172. Males had a median income of $31,527 versus $22,266 for females. The per capita income for the city was $16,101. About 15.3% of families and 17.7% of the population were below the poverty line, including 22.5% of those under age 18 and 12.8% of those age 65 or over.

== Economic development ==
Andrews is a city built on oil and soil. After the first oil well was drilled (1929) by Deep Rock Oil Company on Missourian Charles E. Ogden's property, Andrews County became one of the major oil-producing counties in Texas, having produced in excess of 1 billion barrels (160,000,000 m^{3}) of oil. The cyclical nature of the oil business (as well as diminishing production on existing wells), though, has caused the community to look into new means of economic development, such as waste disposal, which in some areas has caused controversy.

Waste Control Specialists (WCS), owned by Harold Simmons and headquartered in Dallas, Texas, operates a 14,000-acre (57 km^{2}) site in Andrews County on the border with New Mexico. The company was awarded a license to dispose of radioactive waste by the TCEQ in 2009. The permit allows for disposal of radioactive materials such as uranium, plutonium and thorium from commercial power plants, academic institutions, and medical schools. The company finished construction on the project in 2011 and started disposing of waste in 2012. Two radioactive waste landfills are at the site. The 30-acre compact site is owned and regulated by the State of Texas for use by Texas, Vermont, and up to 36 other states. The 90-acre federal site is owned by the United States federal government and is used for Department of Energy and other federal waste. The company employs 130 people or about 1% of the total labor force in Andrews.

For years, a dispute has been simmering concerning to which state these waste sites belong: Texas or New Mexico? The straight north–south border between the two states was originally defined as the 103rd meridian, but the 1859 survey that was supposed to mark that boundary mistakenly set the border between 2.29 and 3.77 miles too far west of that line, making the waste sites, along with the current towns of Farwell, Texline, and part of Glenrio, appear to be within the State of Texas. New Mexico's short border with Oklahoma, in contrast, was surveyed on the correct meridian. New Mexico's draft constitution in 1910 stated that the border is on the 103rd meridian as intended. The disputed strip, hundreds of miles long, includes parts of valuable oilfields of the Permian Basin. A bill was passed in the New Mexico Senate to fund and file a lawsuit in the U.S. Supreme Court to recover the strip from Texas, but the bill did not become law. Today, land in the strip is included in by the way in Texas land surveys and the waste sites for all purposes are taxed and governed by Texas.

The city was set to be the location of the now defunct $400 million HT3R project.

In 1972, Andrews became the site of the first Kirby Company vacuum cleaner factory outside of the original location in Ohio. It is often referred to as "Kirby West" to signify the westward expansion of the company, which employs about 200 people.

In 2011, the city opened Business Park South to provide more incentive options for attracting businesses. Energy Business Park was also opened by the city in 2014.

The city completed more than $3 million in airport renovations. A new $2 million fire station opened at the end of 2013. A new $60 million hospital opened in 2015.

Stores in the town began to sell alcohol for the first time on December 19, 2013.

A $28-million jail broke ground in April 2019. A $5-million expansion of city hall and new food bank were also started.

== Education ==
Students are served by the Andrews Independent School District. The school opened two new $18.5 million elementary school campuses and a $20 million performance center at the high school in 2008.

The Andrews High School started issuing laptop computers to each student in 2012. The elementary and middle-school campuses also began to issue iPad tablets to all students. Students are allowed to take the devices home, but must return them at the end of the school year.

Due to increased enrollments, several construction projects began construction in 2013. New classrooms were added to all school campuses.

A $53-million bond was passed in 2018 for new construction due to growth.

A $156.7-million bond was passed in 2023 for new construction and renovation of the high school complex.

=== Junior college ===
The Andrews Business and Technology Center was completed in January 2006, in conjunction with Odessa College and the University of Texas of the Permian Basin. The school focuses on technology and is a hub for distance learning. A $1 million expansion of the campus was completed in 2013 adding space for a registered nurse program.

== Parks and recreation ==
=== Andrews County Veterans Memorial ===
The Andrews County Veterans Memorial is a memorial in Andrews that was created in 2006 as a tribute to those Andrews County residents who served in the United States' armed forces. Soldiers from every major conflict in which America has participated are honored.

=== Andrews Bird Viewing Trail ===
The Andrews Bird Viewing Trail opened to the public in 2007. The park includes a 0.2-mile trail alongside ponds with an overlook deck, benches, and an observation binocular stand.

=== ACE Arena ===
To attract events to the community, the county funded and built ACE Arena (a multipurpose arena), which opened in March 2007. A smaller outdoor arena was also constructed in 2012 adjacent to the indoor arena.

=== Andrews Splash Park ===
The city approved a $2 million water park to replace the former city pool in 2013.

=== Legacy Park and Museum ===
The city relocated a historic home to property adjacent to the Andrews County Veterans Memorial in 2013, and a plan was approved in 2019 that was to transform the home into a museum. A memorial to first responders and other additions are planned as part of the Legacy Park development.

== Transportation ==
Route markers for Andrews Loop 1910 resemble state highway loop route markers.

U.S. Route 385 (north–south), State Highway 115 (east–west), and State Highway 176 (east–west) pass through Andrews.

Andrews Loop 1910 (Loop 1910) is a highway owned and operated by the City of Andrews. Voters approved bonds to construct a new $13 million loop around town, which opened in October 2013. Since 2021, city officials have been urging the Texas Department of Transportation (TxDOT) to incorporate the loop into the state highway system.

== Notable people ==
- Chad Campbell, professional golfer, born in Andrews
- Misty Edwards, Christian musician, born in Andrews
- Max Evans, artist and writer, graduated from Andrews High School in 1952
- Elmer Kelton, author, born in Andrews
- Jeff Lebby, football coach and former player, currently the head football coach at Mississippi State University, graduated from Andrews High School
- Max Lucado, author and pastor, grew up in Andrews and graduated from Andrews High School
- Mickey Matthews, former head football coach at James Madison University, born in Andrews
- Eagle Pennell, independent filmmaker, born in Andrews
- Shaud Williams, football coach and former player; born in Andrews and graduated from Andrews High School

== In popular culture ==
- Black Gold was filmed in Andrews for its first season.
- Parts of Gasland were filmed in Andrews.
- A music video for the song "Legacy" by Neal Coty was filmed in Andrews.
