= List of Choate Rosemary Hall alumni =

The following is a list of notable alumni of Choate Rosemary Hall, also known informally simply as Choate. A private, college-preparatory, boarding school located in Wallingford, Connecticut, it took its present name and began a coeducational system with the merger in 1971 of two single-sex establishments: the Choate School (founded in 1896 in Wallingford) and Rosemary Hall (founded in 1890 in Wallingford, moved later to Greenwich, Connecticut).

== A ==
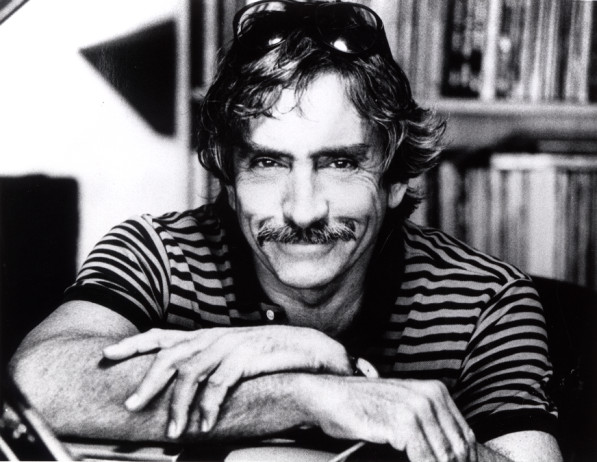
Edward Albee 1946

- Edward Albee 1946, Pulitzer-winning playwright
- Lauren Ambrose (attended), film and TV actress
- William Attwood 1937, diplomat and journalist

== B ==
- William Sims Bainbridge 1958, sociologist
- Felix Barker (exchange student), British historian, theatre and film critic, president of The Critics' Circle
- David N. Barkhausen, Illinois state legislator and lawyer
- Florieda Batson 1921, hurdler, 1922 Olympian
- Nat Benchley 1964, writer, actor, producer
- Joseph Beninati, real estate developer and private equity investor
- Stephen Bogardus 1972, Obie-winning stage actor
- Chester Bowles 1919, governor of Connecticut, US ambassador to India

== C ==
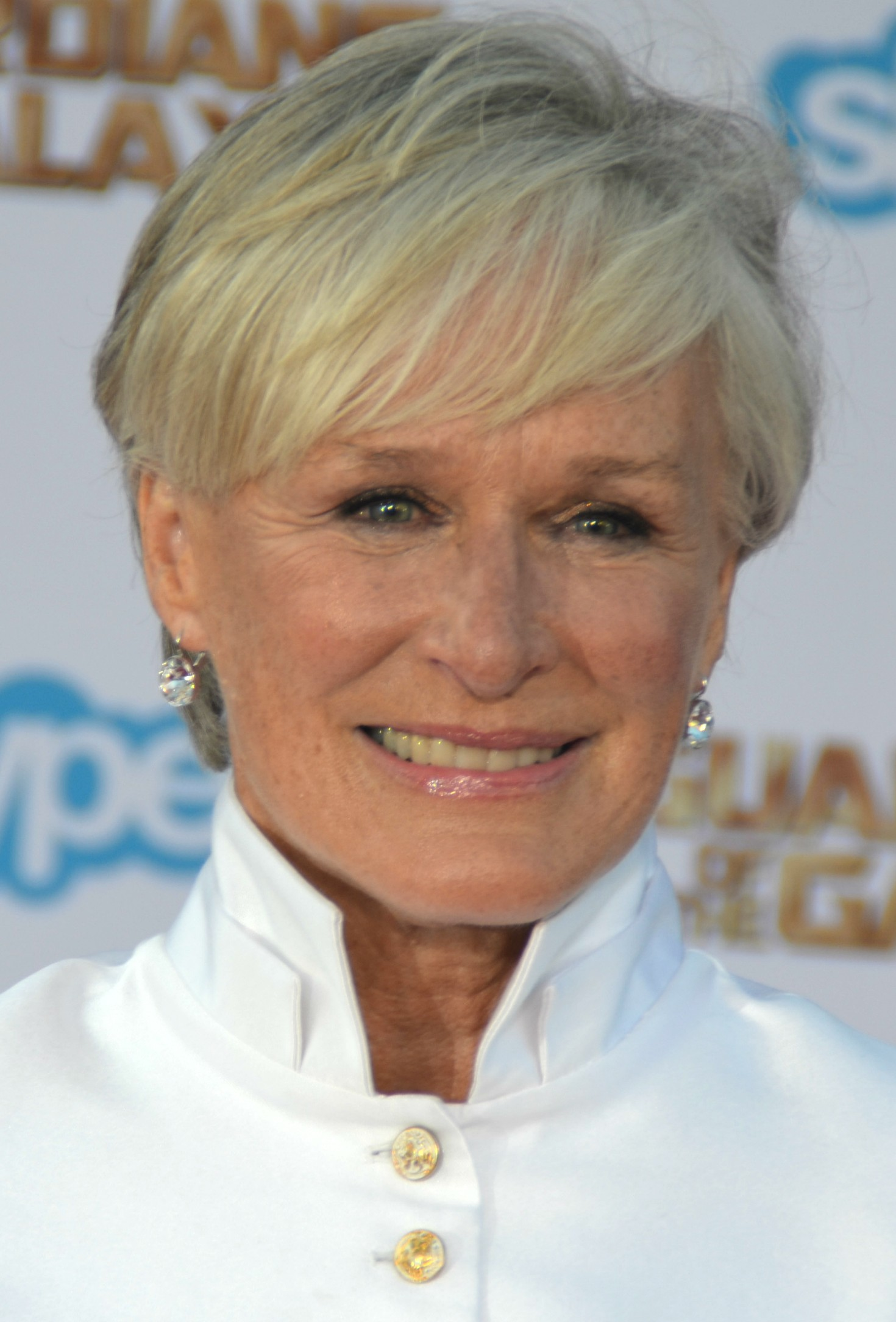
Glenn Close 1965

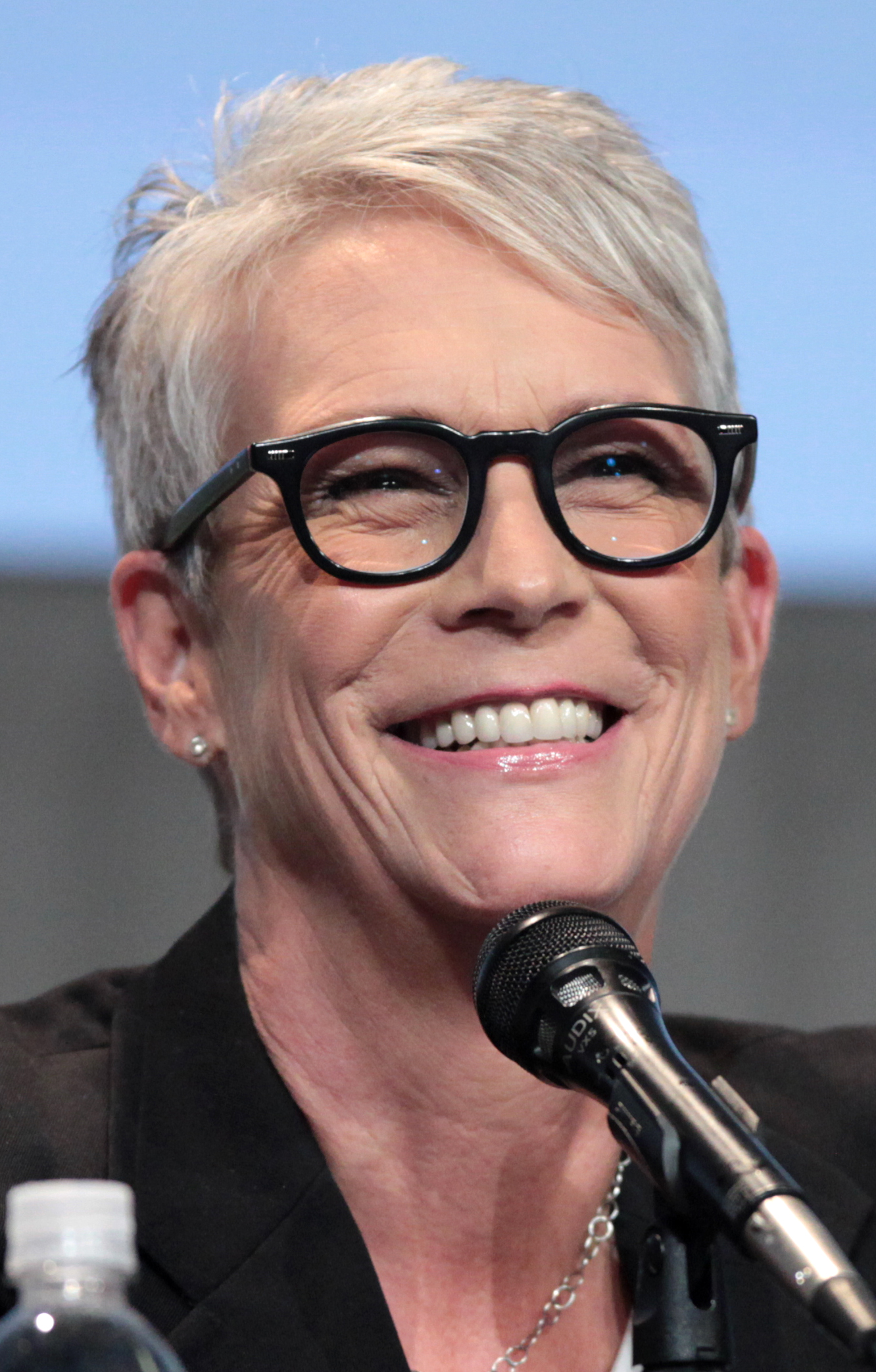
Jamie Lee Curtis 1976

- Arne H. Carlson 1953, governor of Minnesota
- Dov Charney 1987, head of Los Angeles Apparel
- Noah Charney 1998, novelist and art historian
- Tanay Chheda 2014, film actor
- Julie Chu 2001, Olympic hockey player
- Kristen Clarke 1993, Civil Rights lawyer
- Glenn Close 1965, actress
- Jeff Coby 1913, Haitian-American basketball player
- Lewis Augustus Coffin 1908, architect
- Geoffrey Cowan 1960, lawyer, professor, author, and non-profit executive
- Cason Crane 2011, mountain climber
- Caresse Crosby 1910 (Mary Phelps Jacob, Mrs. Harry Crosby), socialite, poet
- Jamie Lee Curtis 1976, BAFTA, Golden Globe and Oscar-winning actress

== D ==
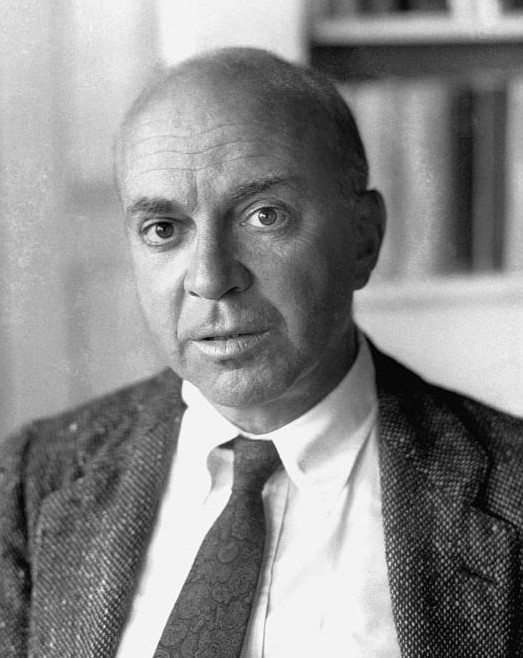
John Dos Passos 1911

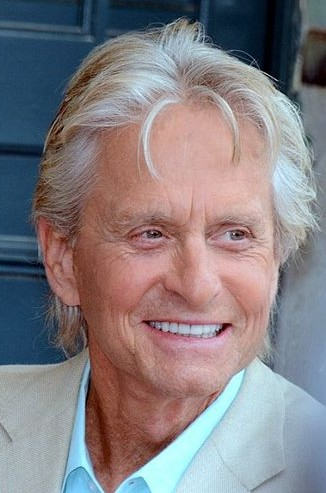
Michael Douglas 1963

- John Danilovich 1968, diplomat, U.S. ambassador to Brazil and Costa Rica, CEO of Millennium Challenge Corporation
- Mathieu Darche 1996, NHL ice hockey player, General Manager of New York Islanders
- Chris Denorfia 1998, MLB baseball player
- Bruce Dern (did not graduate), actor
- Tom Dey 1983, film director
- Lorenzo di Bonaventura 1976, film producer, president of Warner Brothers
- Donna Dickenson 1963, philosopher, medical ethicist
- John Dos Passos 1911, novelist
- Michael Douglas 1963, two-time Oscar-winning actor
- John T. Downey 1947, spy, prisoner of war, judge
- Paul Draper 1954, winemaker
- Andres Duany 1967, architect, urban planner, founder of the New Urbanism movement
- Avery Dulles 1936, educator, philosopher, Cardinal of the Roman Catholic Church
- Matt Dunne 1988, Vermont state senator and state representative

== E ==
- James R. Eddy 1949, veteran, lawyer, politician, judge
- Walter D. Edmonds 1921, historical novelist

== F ==
- Caterina Fake 1986, founder of Flickr
- Jonathan Fanton 1961, academic and foundation president
- Robert Fitzgerald 1929, poet, critic, classicist, translator
- Geoffrey S. Fletcher 1988, Oscar-winning screenwriter and film director
- Katherine B. Forrest 1982, U.S. federal judge

== G ==
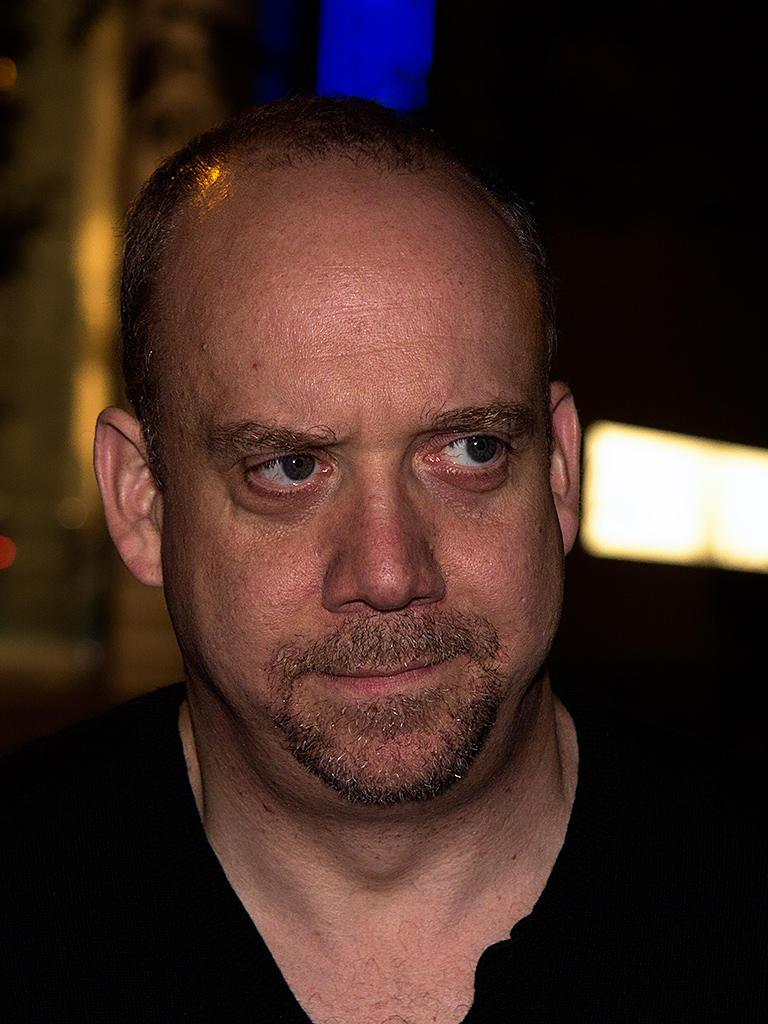
Paul Giamatti 1985

- Oliver M. Gale 1927, advertising and public relations pioneer
- Bruce Gelb 1945, president of Clairol, U.S. ambassador to Belgium
- James R. Getz 1929, founder and mayor of Mettawa, Illinois
- Paul Giamatti 1985, Emmy- and SAG-winning actor
- Philip Gourevitch 1979, journalist, author
- James Griffin 1951, philosopher
- Roy Richard Grinker 1979, anthropologist

== H ==
- Jin Ha 2008, actor known for his roles in the TV series Devs, Love Life, and Pachinko in addition to the musical Hamilton
- William O. Harbach 1940, Emmy- and Peabody-winner, founding producer of The Tonight Show and The Steve Allen Show
- Amanda Hearst 2002, heiress, journalist, philanthropist
- Buck Henry 1948, comedian, actor, director, and screenwriter
- Hong Jung-wook 1989, Korean entrepreneur and ex-politician
- Brian Hartzer 1985, chairman, BeyondPay

== I ==
- Kim Insalaco 1999, Olympic hockey player
- Brett Icahn businessman

== J ==
- Dora Jarkowski 2015, bedroom pop musician, known professionally as Dora Jar
- Eric M. Javits 1948, ambassador, nephew of Senator Jacob Javits
- Hardy Jones 1961, conservationist filmmaker, author

== K ==
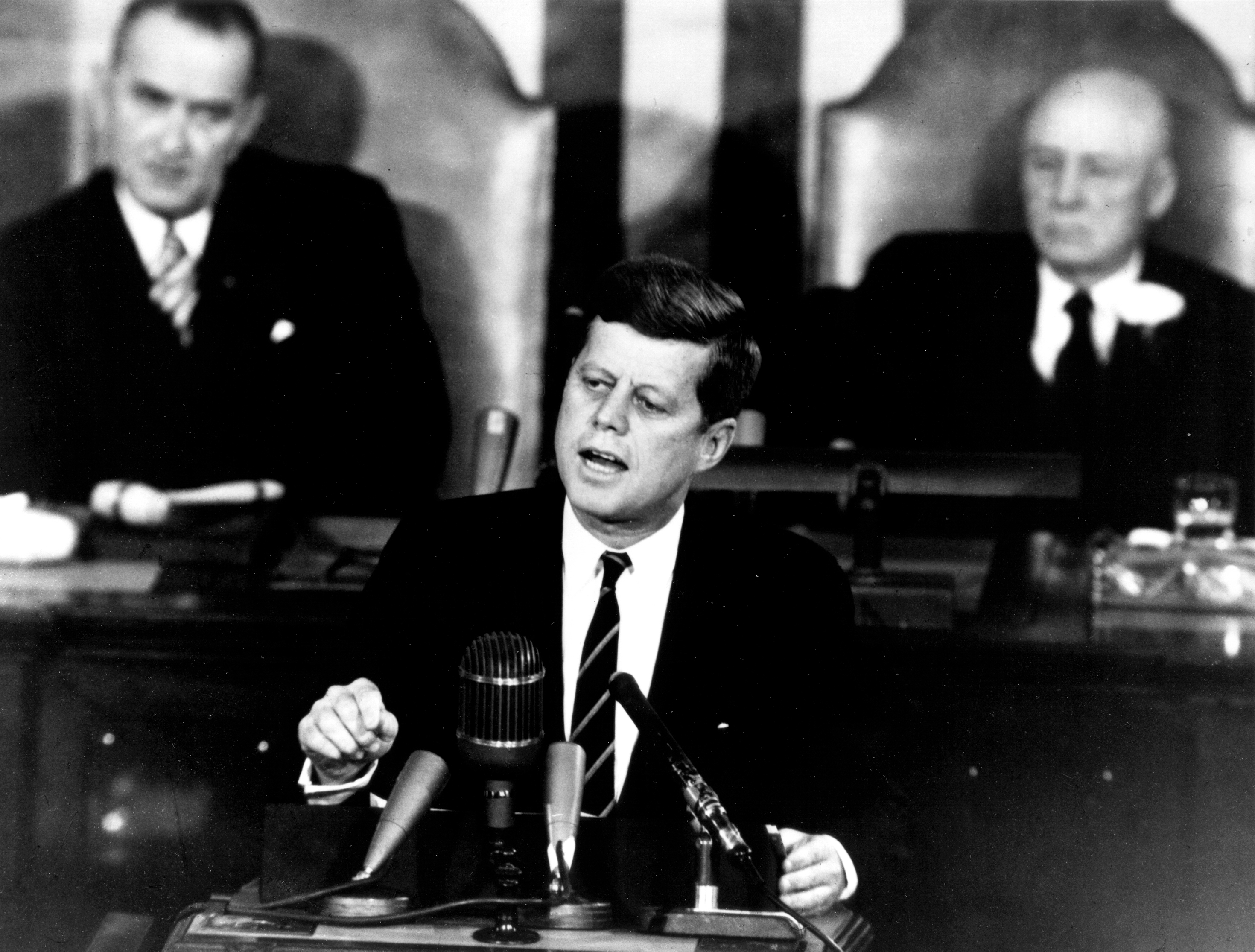
President John F. Kennedy 1935 proposing the Moon-landing program in a speech to Congress, May 25, 1961

- Bob Kasten 1960, U.S. Senator from Wisconsin
- William Kaufmann 1935, Cold War strategist
- John F. Kennedy 1935, 35th president of the United States
- Joseph Kennedy Jr. 1933, naval pilot
- Sarah Kernochan 1965, novelist, screenwriter, songwriter, and Oscar-winning director
- Whitman Knapp 1927, U.S. federal judge
- Hilary Knight 2007, Olympic hockey player
- John K. Koelsch 1941, Medal of Honor recipient
- Herbert Kohler, Jr. 1957, president of the Kohler Company

== L ==
- James Laughlin 1932, poet and founder of New Directions Publishing
- Tom Lecky 1990, antiquarian bookseller, musician, artist
- Alan Jay Lerner 1936, creator of My Fair Lady, Camelot, and Gigi, winner of three Oscars and three Tonys
- Elad Levy 1989, leader, researcher, innovator, for the treatment of stroke in neurosurgery
- Sir Michael Lindsay-Hogg (did not graduate), stage and television director, actor, writer
- Alan Lomax 1930, pioneering ethnomusicologist, folklorist, oral historian

== M ==
Paul Mellon 1925

- Robert McCallum Jr. 1964, U.S. ambassador to Australia
- Douglas McGrath 1976, actor, director, screenwriter
- Ali MacGraw 1956, Golden Globe-winning actress
- George J. Mead 1911, aircraft engineer, co-founder of Pratt & Whitney
- Paul Mellon 1925, philanthropist, art collector, donor of the Yale Center for British Art and the National Gallery of Art East Wing
- Peter Rodgers Melnick 1976, film, theater, and television composer
- Tift Merritt 1993, singer-songwriter
- Helen Stevenson Meyner 1946, U.S. congresswoman from New Jersey
- Rebecca Miller 1980, actress, screenwriter, director, novelist
- William T. Monroe 1968, diplomat, U.S. ambassador to Bahrain
- Emil "Bus" Mosbacher 1939, yachtsman, America's Cup winner, U.S. chief of Protocol
- Robert Mosbacher 1944, U.S. secretary of commerce
- Robert Mosbacher Jr. 1969, Republican politician and former president and CEO of Overseas Private Investment Corporation

== N ==
- Abdi Nazemian 1994, Iranian-American writer, recipient of the 2017 Lambda Literary Award for Debut Fiction
- Nicholas Negroponte 1961, founder of MIT Media Lab and One Laptop per Child
- Philip Nel 1988, scholar of children's literature
- Bruce Nelson 1958, history professor
- Douglass North 1938, Nobel laureate in Economics
- Victoria Nuland 1979, U.S. ambassador to NATO, assistant secretary of State for European and Eurasian Affairs

== O ==
- Terry O'Neill 1970, feminist, president of the National Organization for Women
- Emily Oster 1998, economist and author
- Ifeoma Ozoma 2011, technology policy researcher

== P ==
- Laurie L. Patton 1979, 17th president of Middlebury College and president of American Academy of Religion in 2019
- James Peck 1932, World War II pacifist, Freedom Rider during the Civil Rights Movement
- Stacey Plaskett 1984, U.S. Virgin Islands delegate to the United States House of Representatives
- Josephine Pucci 2009, U.S. Women's National Hockey Team member
- Jim Pyne 1990, NFL player

== R ==
- Prince Anthony Stanislas Radziwill 1978, Emmy- and Peabody-winning producer of Primetime Live
- Luis Armando Roche 1957, Venezuelan film director
- Rick Rosenthal 1966, award-winning film and TV director
- Angela Ruggiero 1998, Olympic hockey player, U.S. member of the International Olympic Committee
- Anne Ramsey (1929–1988), Academy Award nominated and Golden Globe nominated actress

== S ==
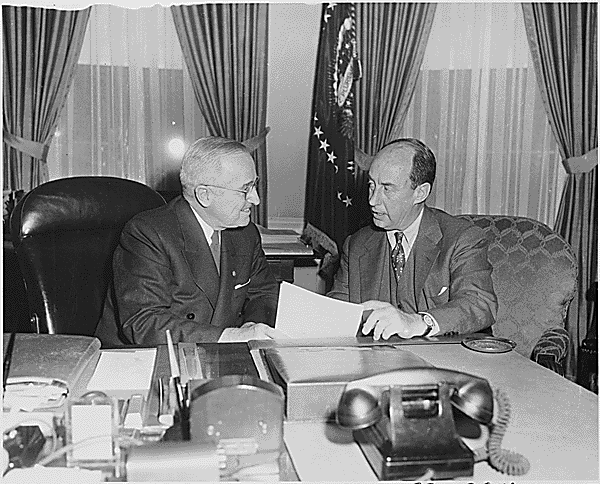
Adlai Stevenson 1918 in the Oval Office with President Truman in 1952

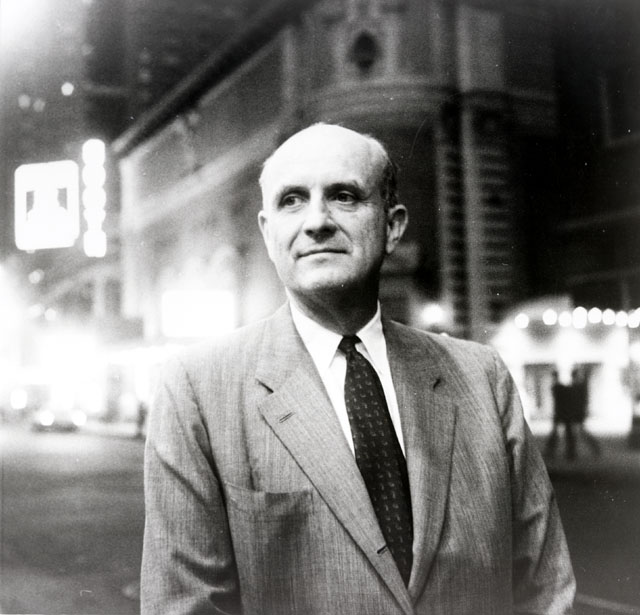
Roger L. Stevens 1928

- Nicholas Schaffner 1970, author, journalist
- Jamie Schroeder 1999, rower, Olympic gold-medalist, Oxford Blue, winner of The Boat Race
- John Burnham Schwartz 1983, novelist
- Martha Schwendener 1985, lead singer and songwriter of Bowery Electric
- Maria Semple 1982, novelist and screenwriter
- Frederick Charles Shrady 1928, sculptor, painter, awarded the Légion d'honneur
- Michael David Shulman (did not graduate), writer, artist, philanthropist
- David Silkenat 1995, historian
- Bill Simmons 1988, sportswriter
- Hedrick Smith 1951, New York Times editor, Pulitzer Prize-winner, Emmy-winning PBS producer
- Lee Smith 1980, journalist
- Window Snyder 1993, digital security innovator
- Gustaf Sobin 1953, poet, novelist, and belle-lettrist
- Khari Stephenson 2000, MLS soccer player and member of the Jamaica national football team
- Roger L. Stevens 1928, theatrical producer, founding chairman of the National Endowment for the Arts and the Kennedy Center
- Adlai Stevenson 1918, two-time Democratic presidential candidate, governor of Illinois, U.S. ambassador to the United Nations
- James Surowiecki 1984, author, New Yorker staff writer

== T ==
- Ivanka Trump 2000, heiress, fashion model, entrepreneur, and presidential advisor

== U ==
- Ian Underwood 1959, multi instrumentalist, member of the Mothers of Invention

== V ==
- Michael van der Veen 1981, lawyer, represented Donald Trump during his second impeachment trial
- Chris Vlasto 1984, Emmy-winning producer of Good Morning America and 20/20

== W ==
- Prince Jigyel Ugyen Wangchuk 2003, heir presumptive to the throne of Bhutan
- Frank "Muddy" Waters 1943, college football coach
- Katharine Way 1920, Manhattan Project nuclear physicist
- H. Bradford Westerfield 1944, political scientist
- George Whipple III 1973, lawyer and society reporter for NY1
- James Whitmore 1940, Tony- and Emmy-winning actor
- David Williams 1986, NHL ice hockey player
- Geoffrey Wolff 1955, novelist and belle-lettrist

== Y ==
- Alexander Morgan Young 1988, president of production at 20th Century Fox
- Philip Young 1927, dean of the Columbia Business School and U.S. ambassador to the Netherlands

== Z ==
- Paul Zaloom 1970, puppeteer, actor, and educator
