= Urlacher =

Urlacher is a surname. Notable people with the surname include:

- Brian Urlacher (born 1978), American football player
- Casey Urlacher (born 1979), American football player, brother of Brian
- Kennedy Urlacher (born 2005), American football player, son of Brian
