= Sheridan Reserve Center =

- Fort Sheridan Historic District
- U.S. National Register of Historic Places
- U.S. National Historic Landmark District
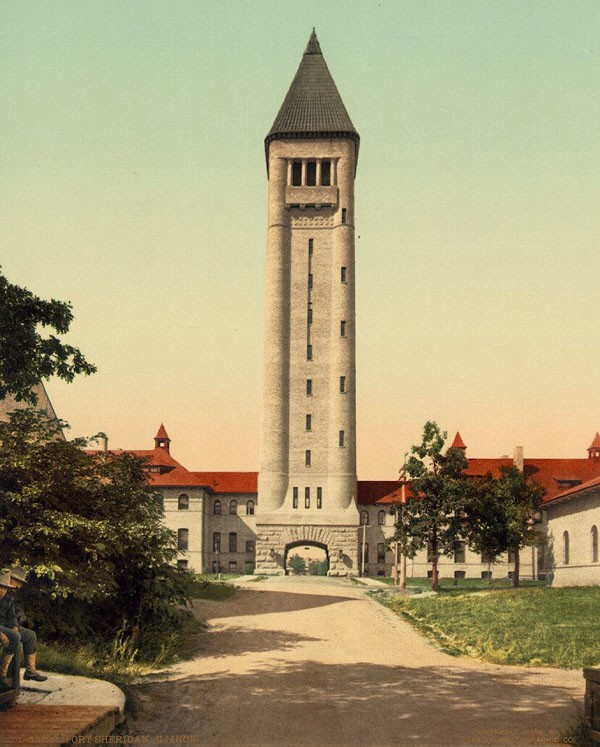
- Fort Sheridan water tower and barracks complex

- Location within Illinois Location within the United States
- Location: Fort Sheridan, Illinois
- Coordinates: 42°12′45″N 87°48′38″W
- Built: 1889
- Architects: Holabird & Roche; Office of the Quartermaster General
- NRHP reference No.: 80001379

Significant dates
- Added to NRHP: September 29, 1980
- Designated NHLD: April 20, 1984
- Westover Road Non-Commissioned Officers' Housing Historic District
- U.S. National Register of Historic Places
- U.S. Historic district
- Location: 339-355 Westover Rd., Highwood, Illinois
- Area: 11.5 acres (4.7 ha)
- Built: 1939
- Architectural style: Colonial Revival
- NRHP reference No.: 08000399
- Added to NRHP: October 1, 2009

The Philip H. Sheridan Reserve Center is the former Fort Sheridan now in Lake Forest, Highwood, and Highland Park in Lake County, Illinois, United States. It was originally established as a United States Army Post named after Civil War Cavalry General Philip Sheridan, to honor his services to Chicago. When the main fort was officially closed by the Army on May 3, 1993, the majority of the property was sold by the Department of Defense to commercial land developers. Most of the original housing structures were then refurbished and resold as a residential community. Other buildings were given to cultural organizations like Midwest Young Artists, the largest youth music program in the Midwest. Approximately 90 acres (36 ha) of the southern end of the original post were retained by the Army; there the Army now operates the Sheridan Reserve Center complex.

In celebration of the 2018 Illinois Bicentennial, Fort Sheridan was selected as one of the Illinois 200 Great Places by the American Institute of Architects Illinois component (AIA Illinois).

== History ==
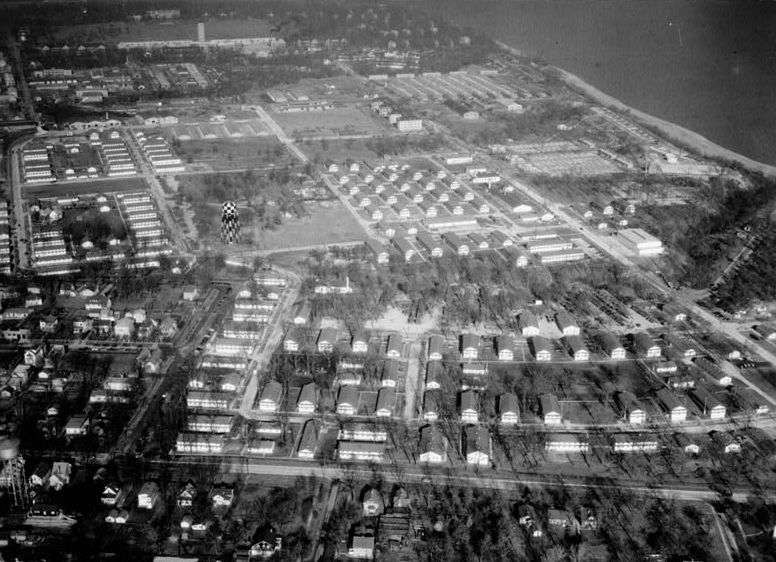
Looking north on Fort Sheridan in the 1970s.

The Commercial Club of Chicago, concerned since 1877 with the need for a military garrison, was motivated by the Haymarket Riot in 1886 to arrange for the donation of 632 acres (2.6 km^{2}) of land to the Federal Government for this purpose. Troops arrived in November 1887 to what was initially called Camp Highwood. A year later, Camp Highwood was renamed Fort Sheridan. Troops stationed at Fort Sheridan were used in 1894 to quell labor unrest during the Pullman Strike.

In 1888, Ossian Cole Simonds was hired to create a site plan for Fort Sheridan which was to include a parade ground for drills. Simonds used a natural ravine to border the meadow created for the purpose. A scenic drive was incorporated into the plan which showcased natural vistas and brick and stone officers' housing. The effect of the plan was lauded as picturesque and charming.

Fort Sheridan became a mobilization and training center beginning with the Spanish–American War in 1898. During World War I, activities at Fort Sheridan included two 1917 Officers' Training Centers, which were commanded by James A. Ryan. Fort Sheridan processed nearly 20,000 returning wounded soldiers and helped them return to civilian life through physical and occupational training reenter the workforce. During World War II, over 500,000 men and women were processed through military service. Many army officers who later became famous lived there, including George Patton and Jonathan Wainwright. The 174th Military Police Battalion of the Leavenworth, Kansas Army National Guard was stationed there in 1950. Fort Sheridan served as the base for supplying and servicing Nike antimissile systems in the upper Midwest from 1953 to 1973, at which point it returned to providing administrative and logistical support services.

The 94 buildings in the Historic District, built between 1889 and 1910, include 64 structures that were the first major works of the architectural firm Holabird & Roche of Chicago. These earliest buildings are made of bricks molded and fired on site, using clay mined from lakefront bluffs. The water tower, originally the tallest structure in the Chicago area, was altered and shortened by 60 feet (18 m) in 1940. The row of buildings flanking the tower were troop barracks. The 110 acre (450,000 m^{2}) Historic District, placed on the National Register of Historic Places in 1980, was designated a National Historic Landmark in 1984. In 1979, the site was documented by the Library of Congress Historic American Buildings Survey.

In 1979, director Robert Redford used a warehouse on the base to build interior sets for his Oscar-winning film Ordinary People.

Fort Sheridan closed in 1993. The decision to close Fort Sheridan came in the 1989 first round of base closings under the Base Realignment and Closure Act (BRAC).

A United States Army Reserve base continues to use about 90 acres (360,000 m^{2}) of the original Post. The remaining property is divided between the Lake County Forest Preserves, a residential development, a Navy family housing development for personnel of nearby Naval Station Great Lakes and a variety of ongoing commercial developments.

== Environmental concerns ==
The geological setting of Fort Sheridan is tableland above a 70-foot (21 m) high bluff in an area cut by seven deep ravines. The bluff overlooks Lake Michigan and the ravines create an open face in the bluff at the beach's edge. Over the years, the Army filled in the ravines with waste generated by military operations. The most toxic waste was placed in the Wells Ravine, also known as Landfill 7. The United States Environmental Protection Agency considers Landfill 7 to be a Superfund National Priorities List (NPL) location. The landfills were not operated in an environmentally sound manner. An IEPA permit was not issued while the landfill was operating, and a high-density plastic containment liner was not used between the ravine and the waste. Regulatory oversight did not begin until 1979 when the State of Illinois commenced litigation. An operating permit was issued two months after the landfill ceased operations. The Army then applied for a closure permit, installed a leachate collection system, and placed a clay cap over Landfill 7. By 1982, the cap had failed due to ponding of water and the failure of the leachate collection system to collect leachate. The Army stated that the cap failure was caused by failure to maintain the cap.

By 1989, Fort Sheridan was facing potential closure by the Base Realignment and Closure commission. The Army began evaluating the permanent closure of Landfill 7 and the inherent problems with its maintenance. Because Landfill 7 had been dispensing 14,000 gallons of leachate per day into Lake Michigan, and the leachate was above state environmental effluent standards, CERCLA allowed the Army to implement an interim remedy prior to deciding on a permanent remedy. The Army chose to construct a $16 million cap. Public comments for this interim action opposed the cap, focusing on the Army's characterization of the type of waste in the landfill, the geologic instability of the ravine and bluff environment, and the proximity to Lake Michigan from which local drinking water is drawn. The Army responded that the cap was an interim solution that was thought to be effective for temporary containment of the waste.

After the interim containment remedy was selected on April 22, 1997, the Army brought in Dr. Shabica to evaluate the shore protections as part of the design phase. On December 2, 1997, he informed the Army that the cap, as designed, would fail due to erosion. The Army responded by purchasing a new system designed by Dr. Shabica's company. The interim cap was completed in June 2004, and the Army may propose making capping the final remedy based on the same analysis that supported the interim action.

The decision to cap Landfill 7 as the final remedy conflicts with some of the recommendations of the geological community. The Army is the lead agency in determining cleanup alternatives. Opponents claim the Analysis of Alternatives found in the remedial investigation, remedial action, and feasibility study was skewed in favor of the Army's preferred remedy which was less expensive. According to the FY2006 Defense Environmental Restoration Program Annual Report To Congress, $58.7 million in cleanup funding had been appropriated for Fort Sheridan. Estimated cost to completion was $22.2 million estimated for FY2003.
