= Fort Sheridan, Illinois =

- Unincorporated community
- Location in Illinois Location in the United States
- Coordinates: 42°12′45″N 87°48′38″W
- Country: United States
- State: Illinois
- County: Lake
- Townships: Moraine, West Deerfield
- Elevation: 665 ft (203 m)
- Time zone: UTC-6 (CST)
  - Summer (DST): UTC-5 (CDT)
- ZIP Code: 60037
- Area code: 847

Fort Sheridan is a residential neighborhood within the cities of Lake Forest, Highwood, and Highland Park in Lake County, Illinois, United States. It was originally established as Fort Sheridan, an Army post named after Civil War cavalry general Philip Sheridan, to honor his services to Chicago.

== Early history ==
A French trading post was established circa 1670 on a trail between Green Bay, Wisconsin, and the early Chicago area. The trail and trading post was used by Native Americans and settlers alike. The settlers were mostly Irish, German, and Scandinavian immigrants. The area was never considered suitable for farming due to the many ravines and heavy forestation. In the 1840s a small community, St. Johns, was established. It was settled on a bluff overlooking Lake Michigan. The villagers were active in logging, leather tanning, brick making, and iron casting. The area eventually became ravaged by rampant deforestation associated with the production of 400,000 bricks annually. The village grew idle and became mostly deserted by 1865. The Fort Sheridan cemetery, established in 1889, is still an ongoing military burial site owned by the federal government. Retired armed forces members may be buried there.

== Fort Sheridan closing ==
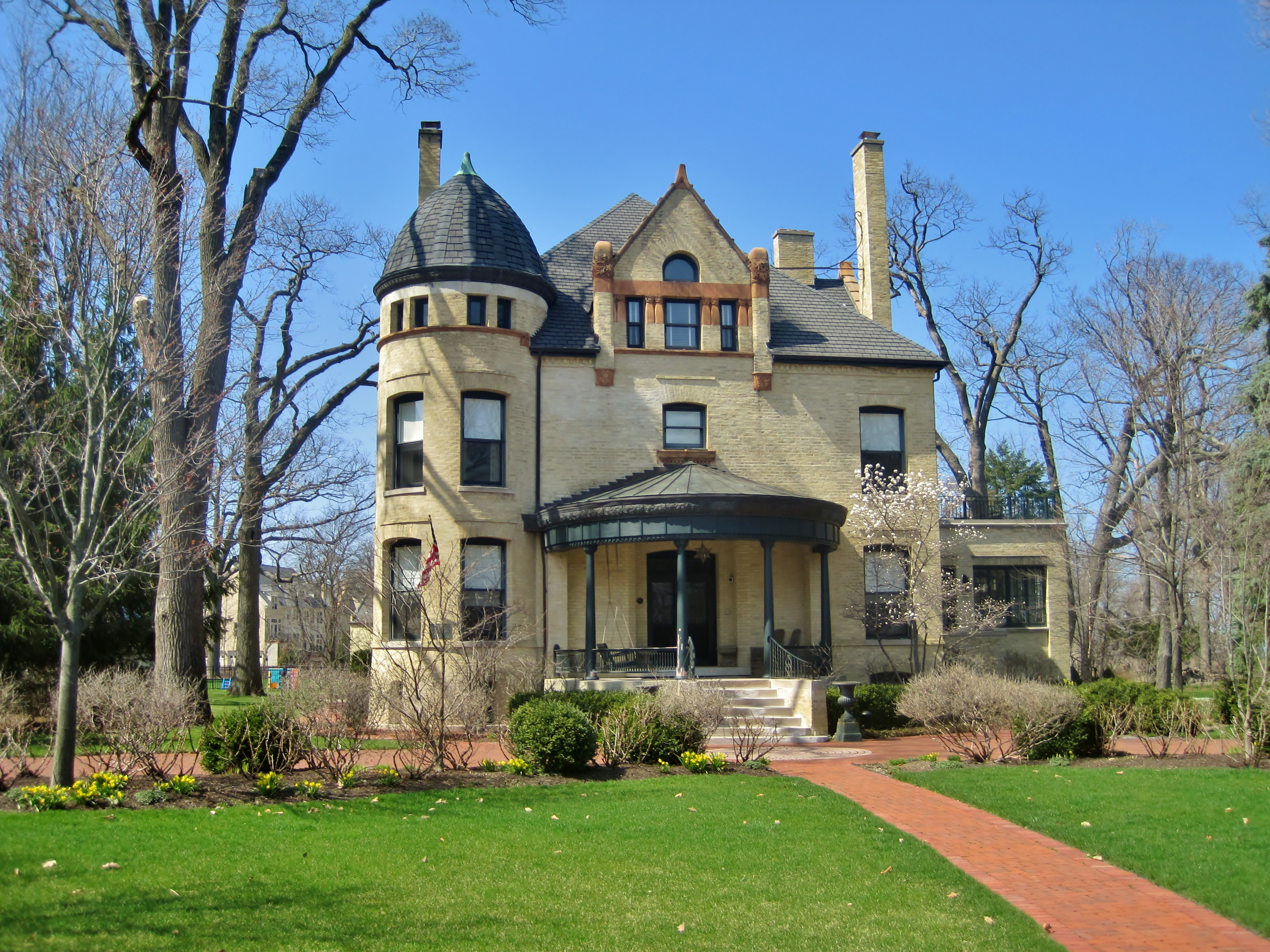
Post Commanders' Quarters, Building 9, in the Fort Sheridan Historic District. They were the most elaborate houses on the base. Like most of Fort Sheridan, it has been converted to a private residence.

The main fort was ordered closed as a result of the first round of closures initiated by the Base Realignment and Closure Commission in 1988, and was officially closed by the Department of Defense on May 3, 1993. The majority of the property was relinquished to the Fort Sheridan Joint Planning Committee as the redevelopment authority, which then sold large segments of the land and housing to commercial land developers. Most of the original housing structures were then refurbished and resold as a residential community.

Other buildings were given to cultural organizations like the Midwest Young Artists Conservatory, the largest youth music program in the Midwest. Approximately 90 acres (36 ha) of the southern end of the original post were retained by the Army; there the Army now operates the Sheridan Reserve Center complex. This includes the Great Lakes Training Division, 84th Training Command (an Army Reserve Brigadier General command), as well as numerous Colonel and Lieutenant Colonel commands. Newly refurbished housing is part of the military enclave and is used for active duty and active guard/reserve personnel and families stationed at Fort Sheridan and Great Lakes Navy Training Center.

== Historic district ==
In 1984 parts of Fort Sheridan were designated a National Historic Landmark District by the National Park Service. The National Park Service states that the site "possesses national significance in commemorating the history of the United States of America." The historic district includes 230 acres (93 ha) of land and buildings bounded by Hutchinson and Bartlett Ravines and the shore of Lake Michigan. There are 94 buildings in the district. The buildings include officers' quarters, barracks, stables, a drill hall, water tower, and many other institutional buildings. The 54-acre (22 ha) parade ground was preserved as open space.

== Forest preserve ==
A forest preserve, operated by Lake County Forest Preserves, now sits on 250 acres (100 ha) of the former fort. The preserve had been working since the 1980s on acquiring land from the U.S. Army. In 1997, the Army began conveyance of the northern section of the former base. The third and final section was obtained in 2001.

The preserve has roughly 4.5 miles (7.2 km) of trail for hiking, 3.7 miles (6.0 km) of trail for cross-country skiing, and 1.3 miles (2.1 km) of trail for bicycling. The preserve includes roughly 0.75 miles (1.21 km) of shoreline. Throughout the preserve are educational exhibits and viewing stations along the trails.

== Transportation ==
The Fort Sheridan station provides Metra commuter rail service along the Union Pacific North Line. Trains travel south to Ogilvie Transportation Center in Chicago, and north to Kenosha, Wisconsin.

Pace provides bus service on Route 472 connecting Fort Sheridan to Highland Park and other destinations.
