= Edward J. FitzSimons =

American politician and attorney (1940–2024)

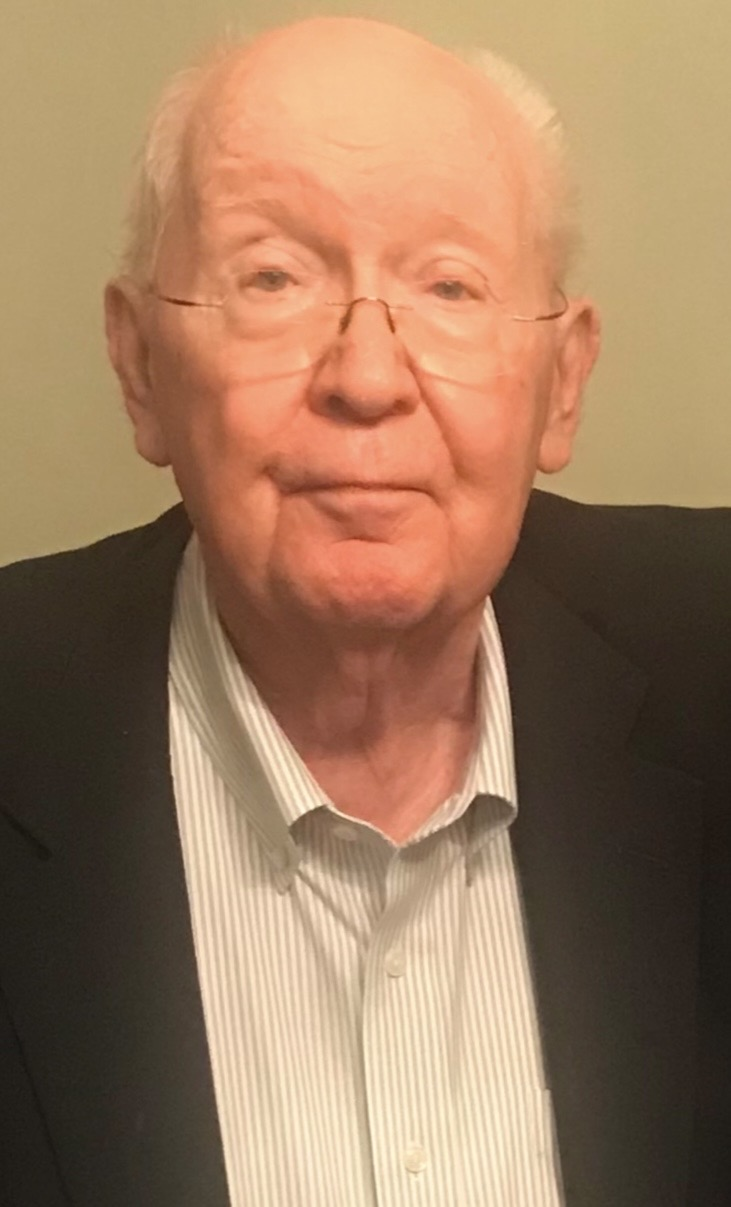
- FitzSimons in July 2019

Mayor of Mettawa, Illinois
- In office 1981–1991
- Preceded by: James Getz
- Succeeded by: Julius Abler

Personal details
- Born: September 29, 1940 Baltimore, Maryland
- Died: November 16, 2024 (aged 84) Evanston, Illinois
- Spouse: Dianne Elizabeth Jefferson
- Children: 2
- Education: Lake Forest College (BA); Northwestern University (JD)
- Occupation: Attorney

Military service
- Allegiance: United States
- Branch/service: United States Marine Corps Reserve

Edward James FitzSimons (September 29, 1940 – November 16, 2024) was an American attorney and politician who served as the mayor of Mettawa, Illinois, from 1981 to 1991.

== Early life and education ==
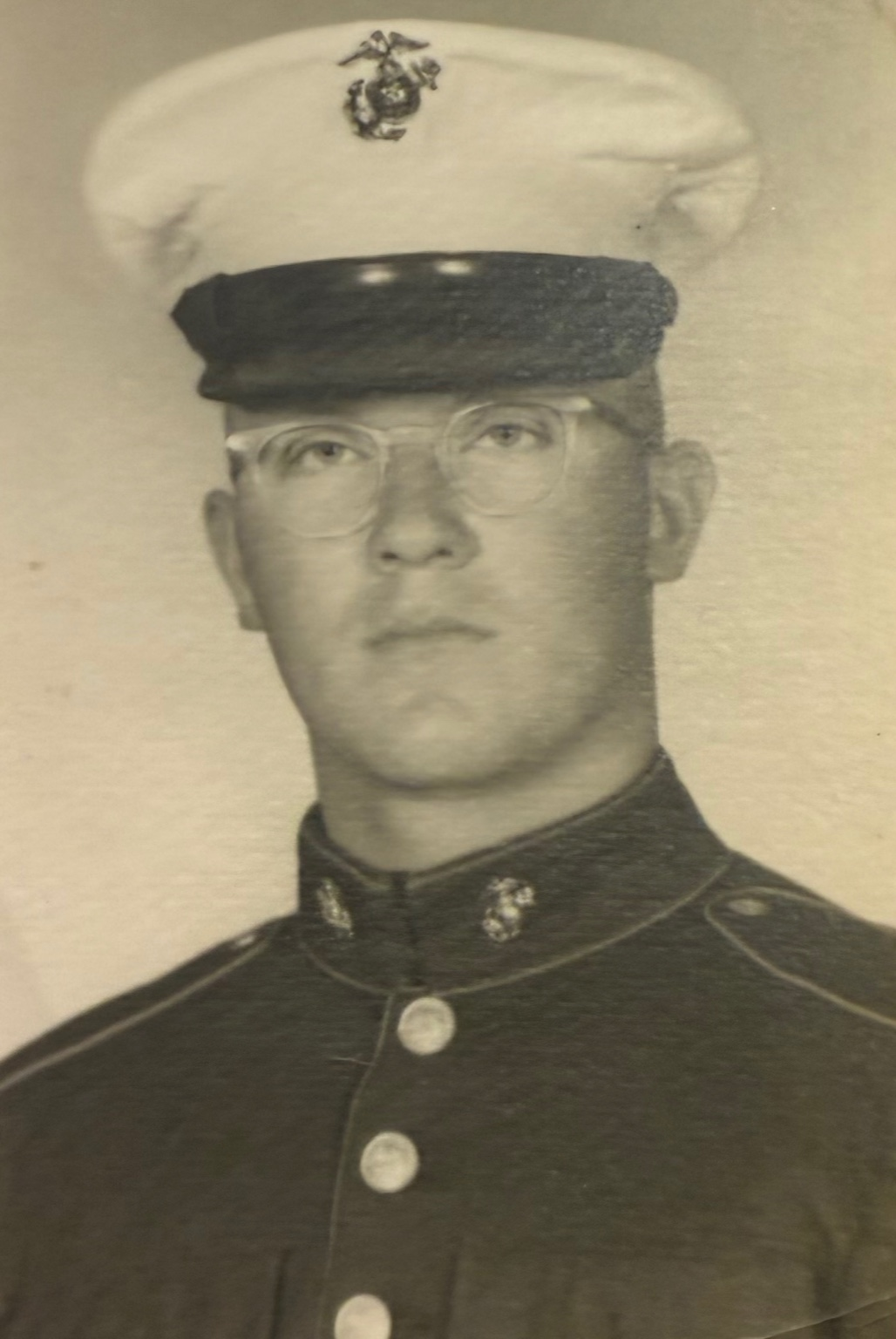
FitzSimons in his United States Marine Corps uniform.

Edward James FitzSimons was born to David Richard FitzSimons and Jean FitzSimons (née Tanner) in Baltimore, Maryland. FitzSimons lived with his parents and older sister, Carol, in Baltimore until, at the age of seven, his family moved to Libertyville, Illinois. FitzSimons was a committed member of the Sons of the American Revolution and of the Boy Scouts of America, in which he achieved the rank of Eagle Scout. After graduating Libertyville High School, FitzSimons attended Northwestern University before transferring to Lake Forest College where he graduated with a Bachelor of Arts in Economics. While at Lake Forest, FitzSimons played for the college's football team. It was during his time at Lake Forest that he met classmate Dianne Jefferson, whom he married in 1964. Around this time FitzSimons also joined the United States Marine Corps Reserve. He would later graduate from Northwestern University School of Law with a Juris Doctor.

== Political and legal career ==
After being admitted to the bar in 1966, FitzSimons began his career as a lawyer in downtown Chicago. Meanwhile, he and his family settled in the northern Chicago suburb of Mettawa. After having served on Mettawa's village board since 1975, he was elected mayor of the village in 1981 succeeding James Getz. Additionally, his wife, Dianne, would also serve as treasurer of the village during this time. Under FitzSimons' tenure there was significant real estate development in Mettawa and surrounding areas marking a period of growth for the village. FitzSimons would serve as the village's mayor until his resignation in 1991 at which point he was succeeded by Julius Abler. As an attorney FitzSimons represented many notable clients from the Chicago area.

== W.W. Grainger Controversy ==
During his tenure and through his resignation, FitzSimons played a pivotal role in the ongoing debate over development in the small village of Mettawa, Illinois. The controversy largely centered around W. W. Grainger, a Skokie-based industrial equipment firm, and its plans to develop a corporate center on a 530-acre property along Illinois Highway 60.

In 1991, after village officials failed to act on Grainger's rezoning request, the company filed a lawsuit seeking to disconnect the property from Mettawa. A Lake County Circuit Court ruling allowed the disconnection, and the village launched an appeal, aiming to preserve its zoning laws and rural character. FitzSimons, however, took a pragmatic stance. While serving as a village board member and later as mayor, he advocated for negotiating with Grainger to limit the impact of development, warning that losing the case outright would leave the village with no control over how the property was developed.

FitzSimons’ approach contrasted sharply with the hardline stance of his political opponent, succeeding Mayor Julius Abler, who led a campaign to resist all non-residential development in Mettawa. This difference in philosophy became a focal point of the 1993 village board election, which was widely seen as a referendum on the future of the village. FitzSimons, supporting a "Common Sense Party" slate, urged village leaders to work with Grainger executives before the disconnection was finalized. He cautioned that an upheld disconnection would likely lead to rezoning by Lake County, rendering Mettawa powerless in influencing the development.

FitzSimons’ history with the issue dated back to his earlier term as mayor (1981–1991). He was the sole dissenting voice on the Village Board when it voted 5–1 to reject Grainger’s rezoning request, a decision that led him to resign in protest. Throughout the legal battles, FitzSimons remained vocal about the financial toll on the village, noting that over $150,000 had been spent on litigation with little success. His campaign emphasized the need to "face reality" and find a compromise to preserve what remained of Mettawa’s original character.

While FitzSimons’ views drew criticism from some residents, who accused him of being too willing to concede to developers, his position reflected his belief that negotiation was the only way to preserve any leverage over the future of the village.

== Post-mayoral life ==
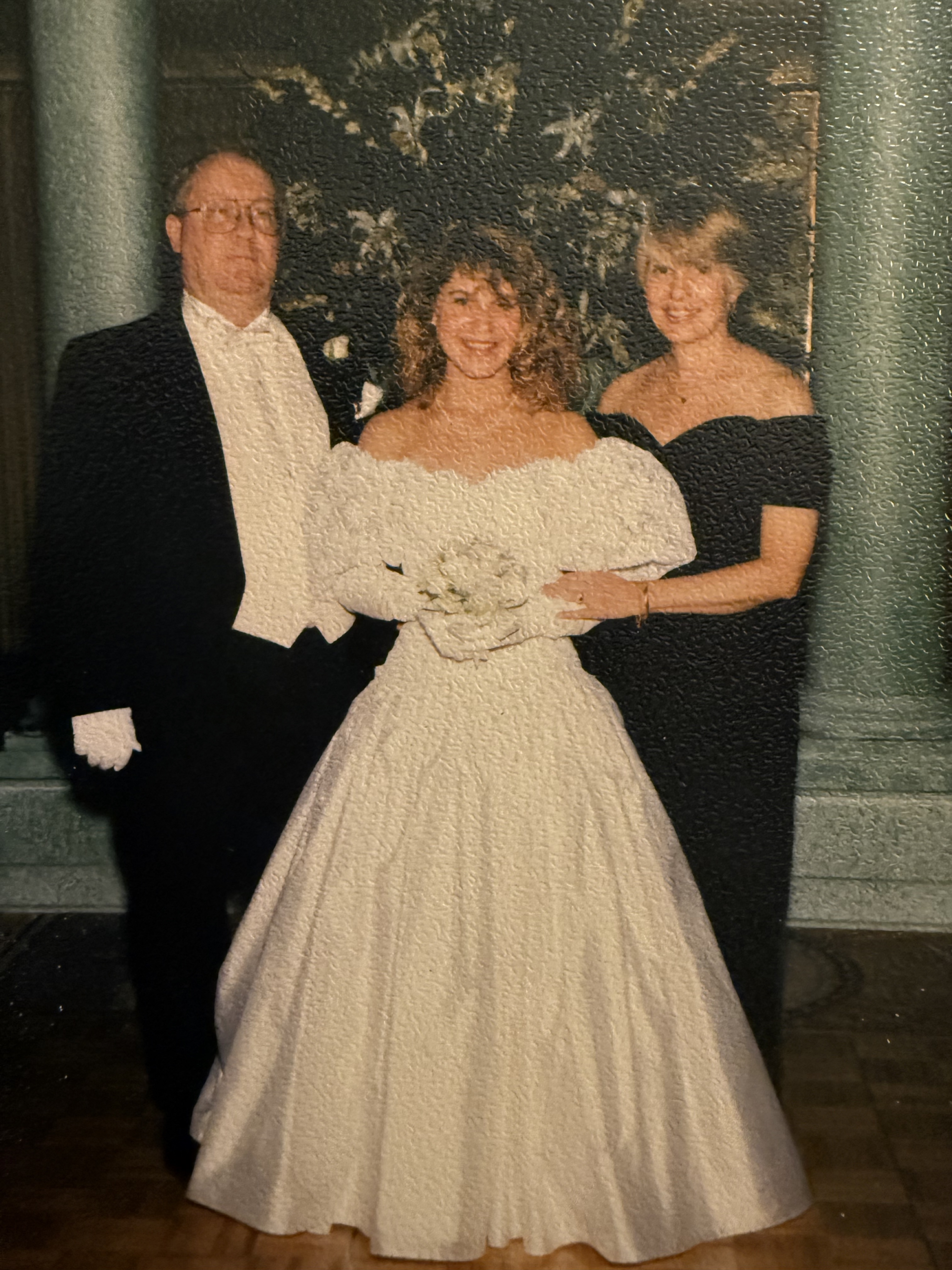
FitzSimons (left), at the debut of his daughter, Ambler (middle), in the 1991 Passavant Cotillion in Chicago.

Soon before leaving office, FitzSimons purchased a house in Ponte Vedra Beach, Florida where he and his family would spend much time in his later years. An avid sportsman, FitzSimons was a longtime active member of the Onwentsia Club, Chicago Athletic Association, Winter Club of Lake Forest, and Ponte Vedra Club. Additionally, FitzSimons was active in his children's schools, the Lake Forest Country Day School, and Lake Forest Academy, having legally represented them both. Instead of ever officially retiring, FitzSimons relocated his office from downtown Chicago to Lake Forest, Illinois, to be closer to home. After selling his Mettawa "Gentleman's farm" to subsequent Mettawa mayor Barry MacLean in 2008, FitzSimons and his wife moved to the North Shore suburb of Lake Bluff, Illinois, where he continued his legal career until his death in November 2024 at the age of 84, from complications resulting from aspiration-induced cardiac arrest and resuscitation suffered earlier the morning of his passing.
