= Middlefork Savanna =

Nature preserve in Illinois, United States

- Middlefork Savanna Forest Preserve
- IUCN category V (protected landscape/seascape)
- Location within Illinois Location within the United States
- Location: Lake County, Illinois
- Nearest city: Lake Forest, Illinois
- Coordinates: 42°15′29″N 87°53′18″W
- Area: 687 acres (278 ha)
- Established: 2002
- Governing body: Lake Forest Open Lands Association

Middlefork Savanna is a of 687 acres (278 ha) nature preserve in Lake Forest, Illinois. Several biomes including oak savannas, dry-mesic prairies, wet-mesic prairies, marshes, deciduous woodlands, and sedge meadows as well as a portion of the North Branch of the Chicago River are found in the preserve. The Middlefork Savanna also contains 25 acres (10 ha) of the “highest quality tallgrass savanna of its kind” in the United States. Such ecosystems are globally endangered. The preserve includes 5.5 miles of gravel trails for hiking and cross-country skiing as well as 4.2 miles of trails for biking. It is managed by Lake County Forest Preserves.

== History ==
Middlefork Savanna opened to the public in 2002. The preserve’s land was purchased by the Lake County Forest Preserves in phases, the first of which was 43 acres (17 ha) in 1989. The last addition to the preserve was made in 2000.

It is named for the middle fork of the north branch of the Chicago River that passes through the area. The historic Elawa Farm, owned by the City of Lake Forest, is adjacent. The preserve is inhabited by endangered species and includes 25 acres highest quality black soil savannah. Many bird species have been documented in the preserve.

The area was once part of a glacial lake. Lake Forest College students have studied at the preserve.
