= Lovington Municipal Schools =

School district in New Mexico, United States

Lovington Municipal Schools is a school district headquartered in Lovington, New Mexico.

The district is entirely in Lea County and includes Lovington. As of 2020 it had the second highest enrollment of any Lea County school district.

== History ==
From 2019 to 2020 the district's enrollment fell by 300 students. One factor was restrictions in New Mexico during the COVID-19 pandemic in New Mexico, while Texas schools at the time lacked such restrictions.

LeAnne Gandy served as superintendent until 2022. The position then opened to Pam Quinones, the previous principal of Lovington High School.

== Schools ==
High schools

- Lovington High School (10-12)
- Freshman Academy (9)
- New Hope High School (Alternative 9–12)

Middle schools

- Taylor Middle School (grades 7–8)
- Sixth Grade Academy

Elementary schools

- Yarbro Elementary School (grades 4–5)
- Jefferson Elementary School (grade 3)
- Ben Alexander Elementary School (grade 2)
- Lea Elementary School (grade 1)
- Llano Elementary School (Pre-Kindergarten and Kindergarten)

== Notable alumni ==
Brian Urlacher
