= Mettawa, Illinois =

- Village
- Seal

- Location of Mettawa in Lake County, Illinois.
- Coordinates: 42°15′16″N 87°55′11″W
- Country: United States
- State: Illinois
- County: Lake
- Townships: Libertyville, Vernon

Government
  - Mayor: Casey Urlacher

Area
  - Total: 5.53 sq mi (14.32 km^{2})
  - Land: 5.45 sq mi (14.12 km^{2})
  - Water: 0.077 sq mi (0.20 km^{2})
- Elevation: 666 ft (203 m)

Population (2020)
  - Total: 533
  - Density: 97.8/sq mi (37.76/km^{2})
- Time zone: UTC-6 (CST)
  - Summer (DST): UTC-5 (CDT)
- ZIP codes: 60045, 60048, 60052
- Area code(s): 847, 224
- FIPS code: 17-48671
- GNIS feature ID: 2399328
- Website: www.mettawa.org

Mettawa is a village in Lake County, Illinois, United States. Per the 2020 census, the population was 533. The village maintains trails for pedestrian, bicycle and equestrian usage. Five forest preserves of the Lake County Forest Preserve District are located within village boundaries.

== History ==
The name of the town derived from Potawatomi chief Mettaywah, who lived in the area before signing the 1833 Treaty of Chicago and being displaced to Kansas. The traveler Colbee reported visiting the chief's village near the Des Plaines River and eating pork, cakes fried in pork fat, and a corn and bean dish. Many Potawatomi returned to Illinois annually until the end of the nineteenth century to visit their burial grounds.

Mettawa was founded by area residents in 1960 who worked together with a common goal of protecting their rural area from encroaching commercial development. Mettawa's first mayor was James Getz; subsequent mayors included Edward FitzSimons, Julius Abler, Barry McLean and Jess Ray. The current treasurer is Amy Weiland. Famous residents and property owners within the area now known as Mettawa have included two-time presidential nominee Adlai E. Stevenson, city planner Edward H. Bennett, and more recently, news anchor and rancher Bill Kurtis and Chicago Bears' linebacker Brian Urlacher (brother of current Mettawa Mayor Casey Urlacher) and running back Matt Forte. Stevenson's Mettawa estate on the Des Plaines River is a designated Illinois Historic Site and is listed on the National Register of Historic Places.

=== Conservation and recreation ===
Mettawa was founded by conservationist landowners and continues to be a center of land conservation and restoration activities. The village also supports a rural, equestrian-friendly lifestyle. Some residents maintain small farming operations, and there are eight horse stables within the village's borders.

The Mettawa Open Lands Association (MOLA) is a non-profit organization that promotes quality open space within the village and encourages the protection of public and private open lands. MOLA supports Mettawa-area residents and open lands (including unincorporated housing developments that are surrounded by village land) with public workdays and educational programs, and provides quality open space management on village properties. In celebration of Mettawa's 50th anniversary in 2010, MOLA distributed complimentary wildflower seed packets to all village residents and to many residents in neighboring areas, and suggested that recipients plant the seeds along roadsides to help beautify the area.

MOLA maintains the Whippoorwill Farm Preserve, an open lands area owned by the village (just west of I-94 at the northwest corner of IL-60/Townline Road and Riverwoods Boulevard). Whippoorwill Farm is currently undergoing restoration to a native prairie/wetland habitat.

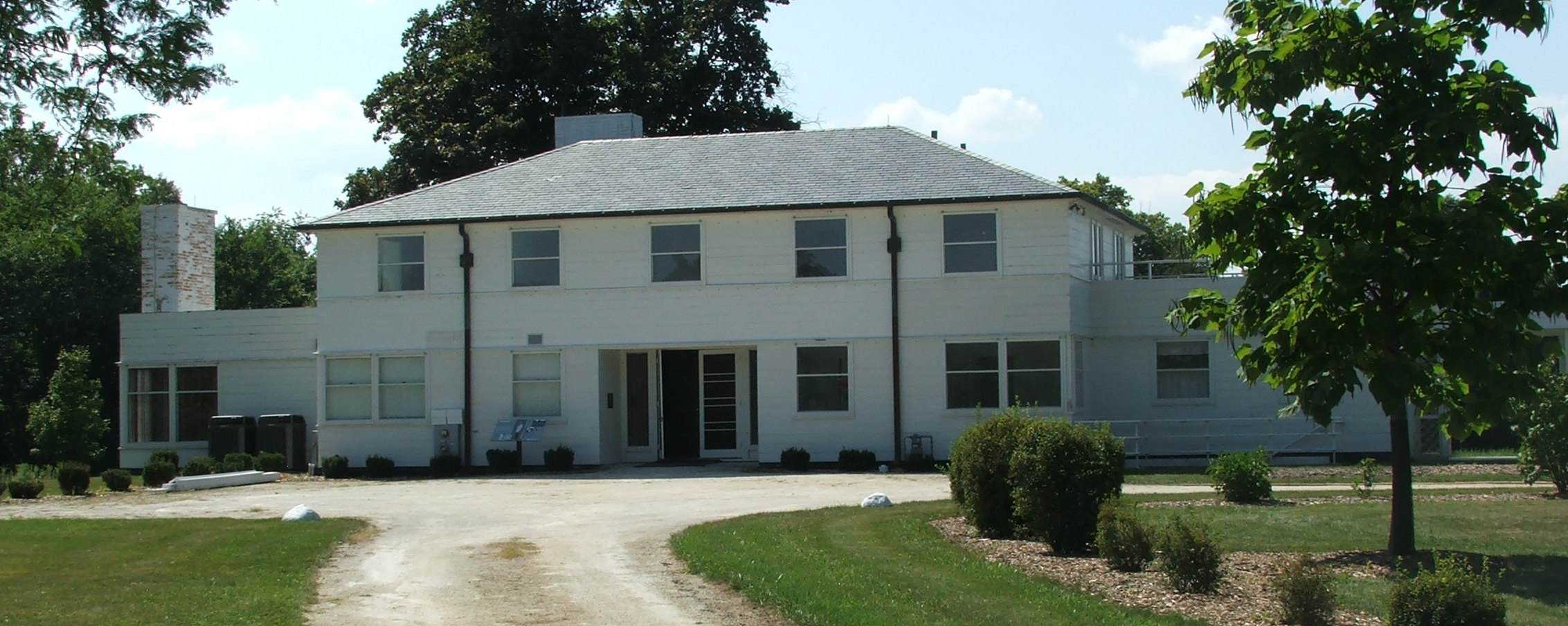
Stevenson's home in Mettawa, IL

The Lake County Forest Preserve District maintains five forest preserves within village boundaries, including Old School, Grainger Woods, McArthur Woods, Captain Daniel Wright Woods and Adlai Stevenson Historic Home.

Mettawa also includes nine areas designated as Illinois Nature Preserves, one area within the Libertyville Township Open Space District, and the Covington Charitable Trust area (maintained by the Lake Forest Open Lands Association).

The Des Plaines River Trail runs through the western edge of Mettawa and connects with the village's own Mettawa Trail system, which is used by pedestrians, cyclists and equestrians.

=== Commercial development ===
Commercial development has occurred within and adjacent to Mettawa in recent years, despite resistance by residents and the Village Board). However, an unusually high percentage of the commercial structures are green buildings which have achieved high Leadership in Energy and Environmental Design (LEED) ratings. Tax revenues from businesses in Mettawa provide income to the village, which in turn provides eligible residents with a tax rebate.

HSBC completed construction of its North American headquarters in Mettawa in 2008. Although no longer corporate headquarters, the building remains partially occupied by HSBC. This building achieved LEED Gold Certification and in March 2009 was named Green Development of the Year by the National Association of Industrial and Office Properties (NAIOP).

The W. W. Grainger company's headquarters is located on unincorporated land enclosed within Mettawa's borders. In 2008 this building was updated to achieve its 2009 Gold LEED certification. Through the 1980s and 1990s, many residents of Mettawa opposed Grainger's plans for office development, fearing it would compromise the village's pastoral character. This issue was a source of significant contention during the tenure of Mayor Edward FitzSimons, who argued that fighting Grainger outright rather than negotiating could lead to unfavorable outcomes for the village. The issue ultimately led FitzSimons to resign in 1991. He was succeeded by Julius Abler, a staunch opponent of Grainger's development plans. In spite of this, Grainger purchased 535 acres (2.17 km^{2}) of land in Mettawa (1993–1998), then disconnected from the village to become part of unincorporated Lake County. In 1996, all of this land was annexed back into the village, with the exception of the 155 acres (0.63 km^{2}) office campus. Grainger donated 257 acres (1.04 km^{2}) to the Lake County Forest Preserve District. The resulting Grainger Forest Preserve hosts an equestrian center and includes open lands filled with rare ecosystems and species. The remaining Grainger acreage is within the village and zoned 5-acre (20,000 m^{2}) residential. Major businesses are also located near the busy intersection of Interstate 94 and Illinois Route 60 in Mettawa.

=== Residential development ===
The village maintains a low-density five-acre zoning requirement for residential development. Most of Mettawa's Planned Unit Developments (PUD) have included conservation easements and land restoration.

The Deerpath Farm conservation community, Mettawa's largest (200-acre (0.81 km^{2})) PUD, includes 140 acres (0.57 km^{2}) of restored open lands managed by the Lake Forest Open Lands Association, and also sponsors community workdays and nature education events. In 2006 it was named Development of the Year by the Lake County Stormwater Management Association for its innovative hydrology management based on wetland restoration.

Other PUDs within Mettawa include Sanctuary Estates and Mettawa Woods.

== Government ==
Mettawa is governed by an elected Mayor and a six-member Board of Trustees.

Mayor

- Casey Urlacher

Board of Trustees

- Carol Armstrong
- Denis Bohm
- Wendie Clark
- Jan Pink
- John Maier
- Tim Towne

Mettawa lacks a dedicated Village Hall and has few paid administrative staff. Village meetings are held in a local hotel, and the Village contracts with an engineer, attorney, Mettawa Open Lands Association, and various consultants for operational services. In January 2009, the Village Board established its website which serves as a virtual Village Hall, providing official information including Village contacts, official documents and maps, meeting agendas and the Comprehensive Plan.

== Notable people ==
- Matt Forte, former American football player with the NFL's Chicago Bears and New York Jets
- Bill Kurtis, News caster and American crime documentary narrator
- Brian Urlacher, former American football player with the NFL's Chicago Bears
- Casey Urlacher, Mayor of Mettawa, brother of Brian
- Adlai Stevenson II, 31st Governor of Illinois

== Geography ==
According to the 2021 census gazetteer files, Mettawa has a total area of 5.53 square miles (14.32 km^{2}), of which 5.45 square miles (14.12 km^{2}) (or 98.61%) is land and 0.08 square miles (0.21 km^{2}) (or 1.39%) is water.

== Demographics ==
Historical population
Census	Pop.	Note	%±
1960	126		—
1970	285		126.2%
1980	330		15.8%
1990	348		5.5%
2000	367		5.5%
2010	547		49.0%
2020	533		−2.6%
U.S. Decennial Census; 2010 2020

As of the 2020 census there were 533 people, 215 households, and 169 families residing in the village. The population density was 96.42 inhabitants per square mile (37.23/km^{2}). There were 256 housing units at an average density of 46.31 per square mile (17.88/km^{2}). The racial makeup of the village was 79.92% White, 0.75% African American, 0.19% Native American, 10.32% Asian, 0.00% Pacific Islander, 4.88% from other races, and 3.94% from two or more races. Hispanic or Latino of any race were 10.69% of the population.

There were 215 households, out of which 27.4% had children under the age of 18 living with them, 69.30% were married couples living together, 7.91% had a female householder with no husband present, and 21.40% were non-families. 15.81% of all households were made up of individuals, and 11.16% had someone living alone who was 65 years of age or older. The average household size was 2.93 and the average family size was 2.67.

The village's age distribution consisted of 20.2% under the age of 18, 8.0% from 18 to 24, 11.3% from 25 to 44, 37.9% from 45 to 64, and 22.5% who were 65 years of age or older. The median age was 50.4 years. For every 100 females, there were 78.5 males. For every 100 females age 18 and over, there were 72.5 males.

The median income for a household in the village was $123,125, and the median income for a family was $168,125. Males had a median income of $106,875 versus $48,393 for females. The per capita income for the village was $85,051. About 5.3% of families and 8.0% of the population were below the poverty line, including 6.9% of those under age 18 and 0.0% of those age 65 or over.

Mettawa village, Illinois – Racial and ethnic composition Note: the US Census treats Hispanic/Latino as an ethnic category. This table excludes Latinos from the racial categories and assigns them to a separate category. Hispanics/Latinos may be of any race.
Race / Ethnicity (NH = Non-Hispanic)	Pop 2000	Pop 2010	Pop 2020	% 2000	% 2010	% 2020
White alone (NH)	340	450	409	92.64%	82.27%	76.74%
Black or African American alone (NH)	0	10	4	0.00%	1.83%	0.75%
Native American or Alaska Native alone (NH)	0	0	1	0.00%	0.00%	0.19%
Asian alone (NH)	9	25	55	2.45%	4.57%	10.32%
Native Hawaiian or Pacific Islander alone (NH)	0	0	0	0.00%	0.00%	0.00%
Other race alone (NH)	0	0	1	0.00%	0.00%	0.19%
Mixed race or Multiracial (NH)	3	2	6	0.82%	0.37%	1.13%
Hispanic or Latino (any race)	15	60	57	4.09%	10.97%	10.69%
Total	367	547	533	100.00%	100.00%	100.00%
