= Lovington High School =

Coordinates: 32°56′09″N 103°21′27″W

Location
- 701 West Avenue K Lovington, New Mexico 88260; United States

Information
- Type: Public high school
- School district: Lovington Municipal Schools
- Staff: 42.35 (FTE)
- Grades: 9-12
- Enrollment: 763 (2023–2024)
- Student to teacher ratio: 18.02
- Campus: Rural
- Colors: Royal Blue & White
- Athletics conference: NMAA - 5A District 4
- Mascot: Wildcat
- Website: lovingtonschools.net/lovington-high-school-2

Lovington High School is the public senior high school of Lovington, New Mexico. Its colors are Royal Blue and White and its mascot is a Wildcat. It is a part of Lovington Municipal Schools.

== History ==
A $600,000 bond financed the school, which opened in 1953. The athletic area next door includes a 5,000 seat stadium that cost $278,478 to build.

== Notable alumni ==
- Ronnie Black, PGA player
- Taymon Domzalski, Duke basketball great
- Shirley Hooper, New Mexico Secretary of State
- Brian Urlacher, NFL player
- Casey Urlacher, Arena Football League player
