= Casey Urlacher =

American politician (born 1979)

Casey Urlacher (born August 24, 1979) is an American politician and former football player. He has been the mayor of Mettawa, Illinois, since 2013. Urlacher previously played football in the Arena Football League (AFL) for two seasons for the Chicago Rush and Nashville Kats. He is the brother of former National Football League (NFL) linebacker Brian Urlacher.

== Early life ==
Urlacher was raised in Lovington, New Mexico. He attended Lovington High School, where alongside his older brother, Brian, won a state championship in 1995. Urlacher enrolled in the New Mexico Military Institute for two years, spending one year as a redshirt and only playing one season. He relocated to the Chicago area to follow Brian, who was playing in the National Football League for the Chicago Bears.

Chad Eisele recruited Urlacher to play for Lake Forest College's Foresters football team. Urlacher played three seasons for the Foresters as a linebacker and fullback, accruing 358 total tackles, 219 rushing yards, 8 rushing touchdowns, and a kickoff return touchdown. He received All-American honors and was also named the Midwest Conference Defensive Player of the Year during his senior year. Urlacher graduated with a business degree from Lake Forest College in 2003.

== Professional football career ==
Casey Urlacher
No. 37
- Position: Fullback / Linebacker

Personal information
- Born: August 27, 1979 (age 47); Pasco, Washington, U.S.
- Listed height: 6 ft 1 in (1.85 m)
- Listed weight: 244 lb (111 kg)

Career information
- High school: Lovington (NM)
- College: Lake Forest College
- NFL draft: 2003: undrafted

Career history
- Chicago Bears (2003)*; Chicago Rush (2004)*; Peoria Pirates (2004); Chicago Rush (2005); Nashville Kats (2005)
- * Offseason or practice squad member only

Career AFL statistics
- Rush attempts: 2
- Rushing yards: 10
- Rushing TDs: 0
- Stats at ArenaFan.com

Urlacher was not selected in the 2003 NFL draft. The Chicago Bears granted him a professional try-out during their training camp in 2003, but Urlacher failed to make the final roster.

The Chicago Rush arena football team signed him to play as a fullback and linebacker, but Urlacher failed to make the team's roster after training camp and was released. Upon his release, Casey signed with the Peoria Pirates of af2, then the Nashville Kats before being cut in 2005 and joining the Chicago Rush again for a short time.

== Civic and political career ==
In April 2013, Urlacher was elected mayor of the Village of Mettawa, Illinois, having won 61% of the vote. In October of that year, Urlacher was appointed by Illinois Governor Pat Quinn (D) to the Illinois' Civil Service Commission. Bruce Rauner reappointed Urlacher to the Illinois Civil Service Commission on May 8, 2017. He served until February 2020, when he resigned his seat.

Urlacher announced his intention to seek the Republican nomination to run for State Senate in the 26th district to succeed Dan Duffy on October 1, 2015. His attempt to get on the ballot was challenged, and state election officials invalidated more than 1000 of his collected signatures leaving him with only 48 above the minimum. In March 2016, Urlacher was defeated in a three-way primary by Dan McConchie by over 1,300 votes.

After the federal indictment, Urlacher initially did not seek re-election as mayor of Mettawa in the 2021 consolidated election. However, after obtaining a pardon from President Trump, Urlacher declared as a write-in candidate for mayor. He was re-elected after obtaining 157 write-in votes. Urlacher told the Daily Herald (Arlington Heights, Illinois) that he filed as a write-in after being urged by his neighbors.

In May 2021, Urlacher filed to run for state senate. Dan McConchie, who defeated Urlacher in 2016, currently serves as the Illinois senate minority leader. Although Urlacher filed to challenge McConchie in the primary, the new state legislative maps put Urlacher in a different district.

== Federal indictment ==
Trump pardon for Casey Urlacher, and 27 other individuals, on January 19, 2021, the last full day of Trump's first term of office

Urlacher was among 10 people charged in a federal indictment alleging they ran an offshore sports gambling ring that raked in millions of dollars from hundreds of Chicago-area gamblers. The ring was led by Vincent "Uncle Mick" DelGuidice, a reputed associate of the Chicago Outfit who owned a gambling website registered in Costa Rica. Urlacher first was a customer of the gambling ring, before accumulating substantial debts, which he agreed to work off by recruiting new gamblers and collecting debts. He was charged with conspiracy and running an illegal gambling business. He is accused of acting as an agent for the gambling ring, recruiting bettors in exchange for a cut of their eventual losses. Urlacher pleaded not guilty to the charges in March 2020. Urlacher was pardoned by President Donald Trump during his last hours in office on January 20, 2021.
