= Adlai E. Stevenson II Farm =

Historic house in Illinois, United States

- U.S. National Register of Historic Places
- U.S. National Historic Landmark District
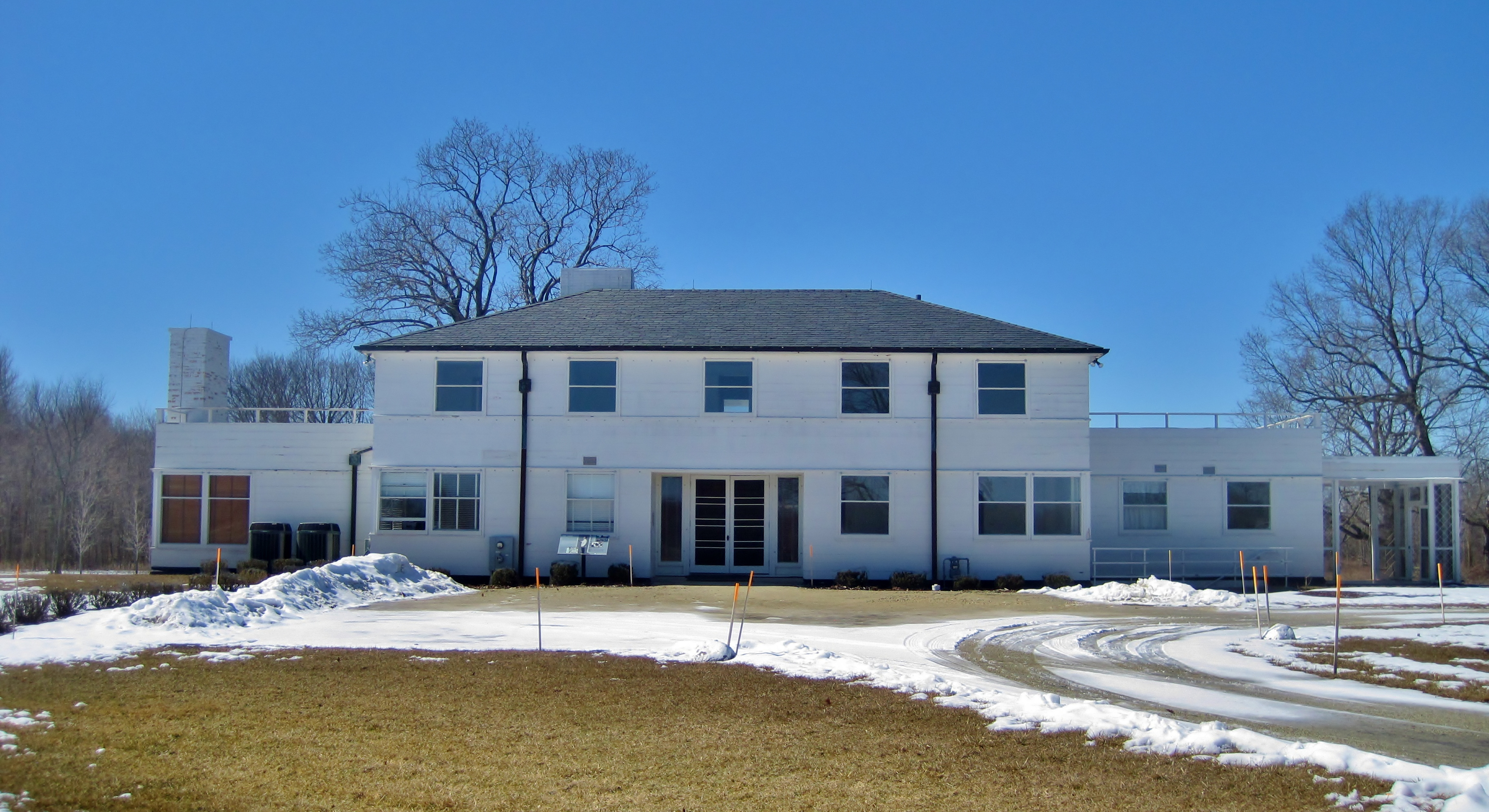

- Location within Illinois Location within the United States
- Location: 25200 N. Saint Mary's Rd., Mettawa, Illinois
- Coordinates: 42°13′44″N 87°55′50″W
- Built: 1938
- NRHP reference No.: 03000918

Significant dates
- Added to NRHP: September 14, 2003
- Designated NHLD: April 23, 2014

The Adlai E. Stevenson II Farm, also known as Adlai E. Stevenson Historic Home is a historic property located on St. Mary's Road in Mettawa, Illinois. Between 1936 and his death it was the home of Adlai Stevenson II (1900–1965), a Democratic politician who was the governor of Illinois between 1949 and 1953, was twice the Democratic Party's presidential candidate in the 1952 and 1956 elections, and was a candidate for the Democratic presidential nomination again in 1960, losing to Senator John F. Kennedy. Stevenson served as the US ambassador to the United Nations from 1961 until his death in July 1965. He was America's UN Ambassador during the Cuban Missile Crisis in October 1962. The farm was listed on the National Register of Historic Places and has also been designated a National Historic Landmark. The property is located in the northern suburbs of Chicago, in the Captain Daniel Wright Woods Forest Preserve. It currently functions as a museum.

== History ==
Stevenson and his wife bought the 44 acres (18 ha) farm in 1935. Later they purchased another 30 acres (12 ha), of which 3.5 acres (1.4 ha) is currently part of the property. Their first house was built on the farm in 1936, but it was destroyed in a fire in January 1938. Later that year the Stevensons had a new home built, and it is the house that stands on the property today. The Stevensons raised all three of their sons in the home, including Adlai Stevenson III, their eldest son, who would become a US Senator from Illinois (1970–1981). Stevenson and his wife, Ellen Borden, divorced in 1949. Stevenson kept the farm in the divorce, while Ellen moved to Chicago. Stevenson continued to live intermittently at the house throughout the 1950s and 1960s, but was often away due to his political and diplomatic career. He died in July 1965 when he was in London. In 1969, most of the farm was sold to Edison Dick, a Stevenson friend. The estate was then donated to the Lake County Forest Preserve District in 1974. Between 1982 and 2000, the estate served as a day center for the Lake County Health Department. On September 14, 2003, the property was listed on the National Register of Historic Places. In 2005 and 2007, the house and the service area were rehabilitated.

== Estate ==
The estate is owned by the Lake County Forest Preserve District and contains the main house (1938), the service building (1937–39), the tennis court (after 1945), and the barn (1958). The farm landscape is also protected as a separate element of the property.

The house, designed by the firm of Perkins, Wheeler and Will, incorporates elements of 1920's European avant-garde architecture: It is composed of block-like elements with no or little exterior ornamental design. The hip roof is shallow and broadly overhanging, which produces a reminiscence of the American Prairie School. The house is oriented in the meridional direction, with the dimensions of 106 feet (32 m) to 37 feet (11 m). It was originally painted yellow, but was repainted white during Stevenson's lifetime. In the center, there is a two-floor block, with two one-floor blocks at the sides.

The interior is minimalistic as well, conforming to the International style. The first floor has thirteen rooms, including the Stevenson's study with the original furniture, two bathrooms, and a service porch; the second floor of the central part of the house contains six rooms.

== See also ==
- List of National Historic Landmarks in Illinois
- National Register of Historic Places listings in Lake County, Illinois
