= Oliver M. Gale =

Oliver M. Gale (1910–2006) was a pioneer in the field of advertising and public relations. He was born in Ventura, California, graduated from The Choate School (now Choate Rosemary Hall) in 1927, and earned a bachelor's degree from Harvard University in 1931.

In 1949 Gale started a separate public relations department at his employer Procter & Gamble, a rarity in corporate America at the time. When Neil McElroy (Procter & Gamble's president) became secretary of defense under United States President Dwight D. Eisenhower, Gale served as his special assistant from 1957 to 1960. Gale then returned to Cincinnati to start his own public relations company. On his death in 2006, Procter & Gamble established the Oliver Gale Society.
