= Fort Sheridan Water Tower =

- Water Tower, Building 49
- U.S. National Register of Historic Places
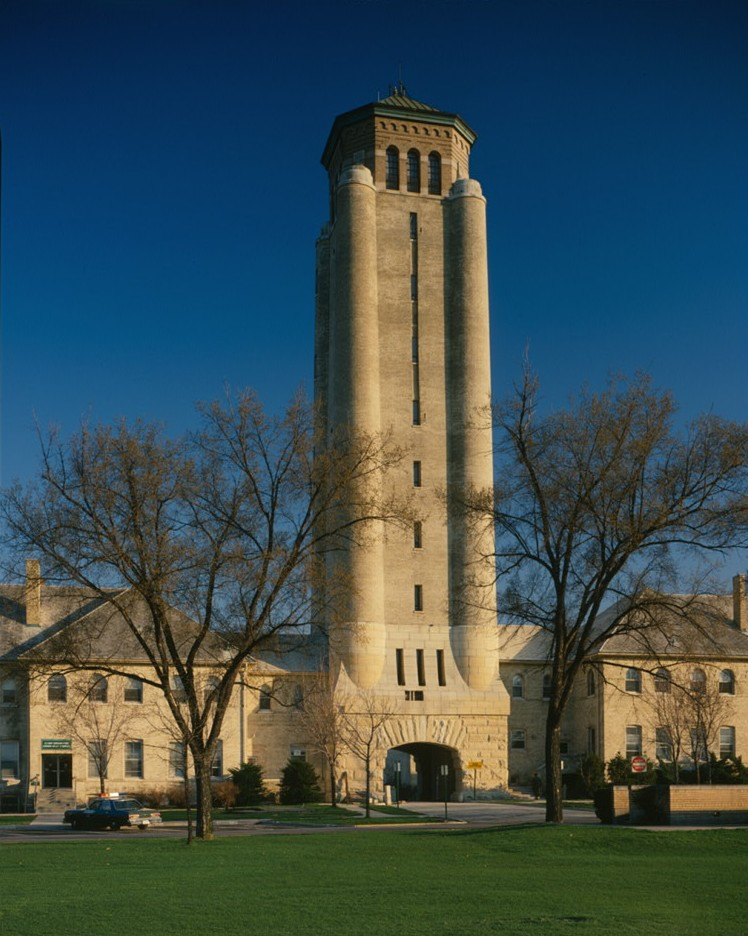

- Location within Illinois Location within the United States
- Location: Leonard Wood Avenue; Fort Sheridan, Illinois U.S.
- Coordinates: 42°12′59″N 87°48′42″W
- Area: 0.1 acres (0.040 hectares)
- Built: 1889–91
- Architect: Holabird & Roche
- NRHP reference No.: 74000764
- Added to NRHP: December 4, 1974

The Fort Sheridan Water Tower is a water tower in Fort Sheridan, Illinois.

== History ==
The water tower was the main landmark of the Fort Sheridan military base, where it was part of a barracks complex. The base was commissioned in 1887 and was used by the United States Army until 1993. Built from 1889 to 1891, the tower was among the first structures completed in the fort. It was built with bricks made from Lake Bluff clay and designed to resemble St. Mark's Campanile in Venice. The bricks were creamy yellow and the roof was red terra cotta. The tower originally stood 227 feet (69 m) high, which listed it among the tallest buildings in Illinois. A road which was once part of Sheridan Road passed through the arch at the bottom of the tower. Today, the arch only allows foot traffic. The tower held a 90,000 US gallons (340,000 L; 75,000 imp gal) steel tank for water storage. The tank could be accessed by a 225-step spiral staircase.

The water tower was part of the complex used in the aftermath of World War I as U.S.A. General Hospital No. 28, later known as Lovell General Hospital. The hospital was only in use from 1918 to 1920. In 1949, the tower was lowered 58 feet (18 m) to combat a structural weakness. This brought the Fort Sheridan Water Tower to its current height, 169 feet (52 m). The tower's prominence has led to its use as a navigational landmark in the area.

The tower was recognized by the National Park Service with a listing on the National Register of Historic Places on December 4, 1974 under the name Water Tower, Building 49. On September 29, 1980, the building was listed as a contributing property to the Fort Sheridan Historic District, a National Historic Landmark District.
