= Brian Urlacher =

American football player (born 1978)

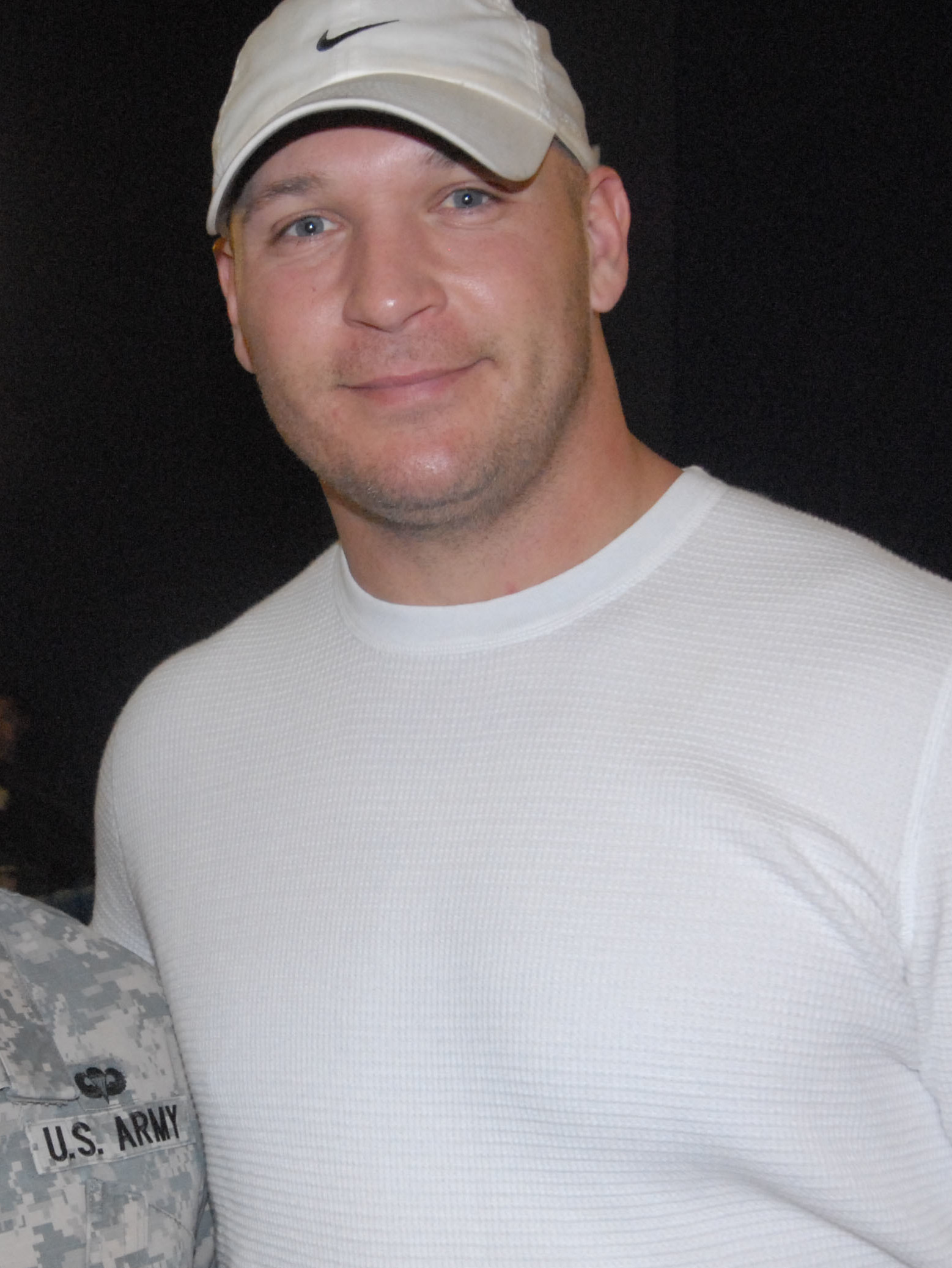
- Urlacher in 2014

No. 54
- Position: Linebacker

Personal information
- Born: May 25, 1978 (age 48); Pasco, Washington, U.S.
- Listed height: 6 ft 4 in (1.93 m)
- Listed weight: 258 lb (117 kg)

Career information
- High school: Lovington (Lovington, New Mexico)
- College: New Mexico (1996–1999)
- NFL draft: 2000: 1st round, 9th overall pick

Career history
- Chicago Bears (2000–2012)

Awards and highlights
- NFL Defensive Player of the Year (2005); NFL Defensive Rookie of the Year (2000); 4× First-team All-Pro (2001, 2002, 2005, 2006); Second-team All-Pro (2010); 8× Pro Bowl (2000–2003, 2005, 2006, 2010, 2011); NFL solo tackles leader (2002); NFL 2000s All-Decade Team; PFWA All-Rookie Team (2000); 100 greatest Bears of All-Time; Consensus All-American (1999); MW Player of the Year (1999); First-team All-MW (1999); New Mexico Lobos No. 44 retired

Career NFL statistics
- Total tackles: 1,361
- Sacks: 41.5
- Forced fumbles: 11
- Fumble recoveries: 15
- Pass deflections: 90
- Interceptions: 22
- Defensive touchdowns: 4
- Stats at Pro Football Reference
- Pro Football Hall of Fame
- College Football Hall of Fame

Brian Urlacher (/ˈɜːrlækər/; born May 25, 1978) is an American former professional football linebacker who played in the National Football League (NFL) for 13 seasons with the Chicago Bears. He played college football for the New Mexico Lobos, earning consensus All-American honors and winning MW Player of the Year in 1999. He was selected ninth overall by the Bears in the 2000 NFL draft.

Urlacher quickly established himself as one of the NFL's most productive defensive players, winning the NFL Rookie of the Year Award. During his career, he was selected to eight Pro Bowls, recognized as a first-team All-Pro four times, and won NFL Defensive Player of the Year in 2005. He was inducted to the College Football Hall of Fame in 2017 and the Pro Football Hall of Fame in 2018.

== Early life ==
Urlacher was born to Bradley and Lavoyda Urlacher in Pasco, Washington, and his parents raised him with his younger brother Casey Urlacher. After his parents separated, Lavoyda raised Urlacher and his siblings in Lovington, New Mexico. He spent his youth immersed in sports, and developed an interest in football, basketball, track, and later table tennis; he graduated from Lovington High School in 1996. While his mother worked several jobs to keep her family afloat, Urlacher spent his teenage years playing sports for Lovington High School and training in weight rooms.

As he progressed through high school, Urlacher gained experience in all three phases of football. He saw playing time as a running back, wide receiver, return specialist, and defensive back. Urlacher led the Lovington High School Wildcats to an undefeated 14–0 season, and a division 3-A state championship in 1995. He finished the season with twelve touchdown receptions, six touchdown returns, and two rushing touchdowns. He additionally received state-recognized honors in football, as well as basketball. Lovington has since recognized Urlacher's accomplishments by retiring his high-school jersey number, and naming a holiday after him.

Urlacher wanted to attend Texas Tech University, but the school did not offer him an athletic scholarship.

== College career ==
Urlacher enrolled at the University of New Mexico, majored in criminology, and played for the Lobos. Their head coach, Dennis Franchione, converted Urlacher to linebacker, but often left him on the sidelines in favor of more experienced players. The team finished with winning records during Urlacher's first two years and made a trip to the 1997 Insight.com Bowl. The team's success prompted Franchione to leave New Mexico in favor of Texas Christian University. His departure prompted the school to hire Rocky Long, a former coach at UCLA.

Urlacher flourished under Long's tenure. Urlacher not only received more playing time, but also played a more versatile role on both offense and defense. Long converted Urlacher into a "Lobo-Back", a cross between a linebacker and free safety, and placed him in a 3–3–5 defense scheme. He spent significant time training with the team's defensive coordinator, Bronco Mendenhall, who helped Urlacher refine his skills as a defensive back. Long also used Urlacher as a return specialist and wide receiver throughout his final two years with the Lobos. Despite Long's extensive changes to the team's roster, formations, and work ethic, the Lobos' performance declined. However, Urlacher became one of the team's most productive players during this time. He finished his career with 442 tackles, three interceptions, 11 sacks, and 11 forced fumbles. Outside of defense, he made seven receptions for 61 yards and six touchdowns as a wide receiver, and had 19 returns for 290 yards as a kick returner.

After the 1999 season, he was one of the finalists for the Jim Thorpe Award, and finished twelfth on the Heisman Trophy ballot. Urlacher received All-American honors from Walter Camp, Football Writers Association of America, and the Associated Press. He played his final collegiate game at the 2000 Senior Bowl, where he was one of the game's top players. Urlacher led the nation with 178 tackles during his junior year, and also set a school record for most tackles in a single season. He finished with the third most career tackles in the University of New Mexico's history. The school has honored Urlacher on several occasions. They awarded him with the Male Athlete of the Year Award in 2000, and held a special halftime ceremony to honor his success in 2006. Urlacher was also the first person to be inducted into the University of New Mexico's Football Wall of Fame. On November 9, 2013, during halftime of New Mexico's game against Air Force, the school retired Urlacher's No. 44 jersey. Urlacher was inducted into the College Football Hall of Fame on December 5, 2017.

== Professional career ==
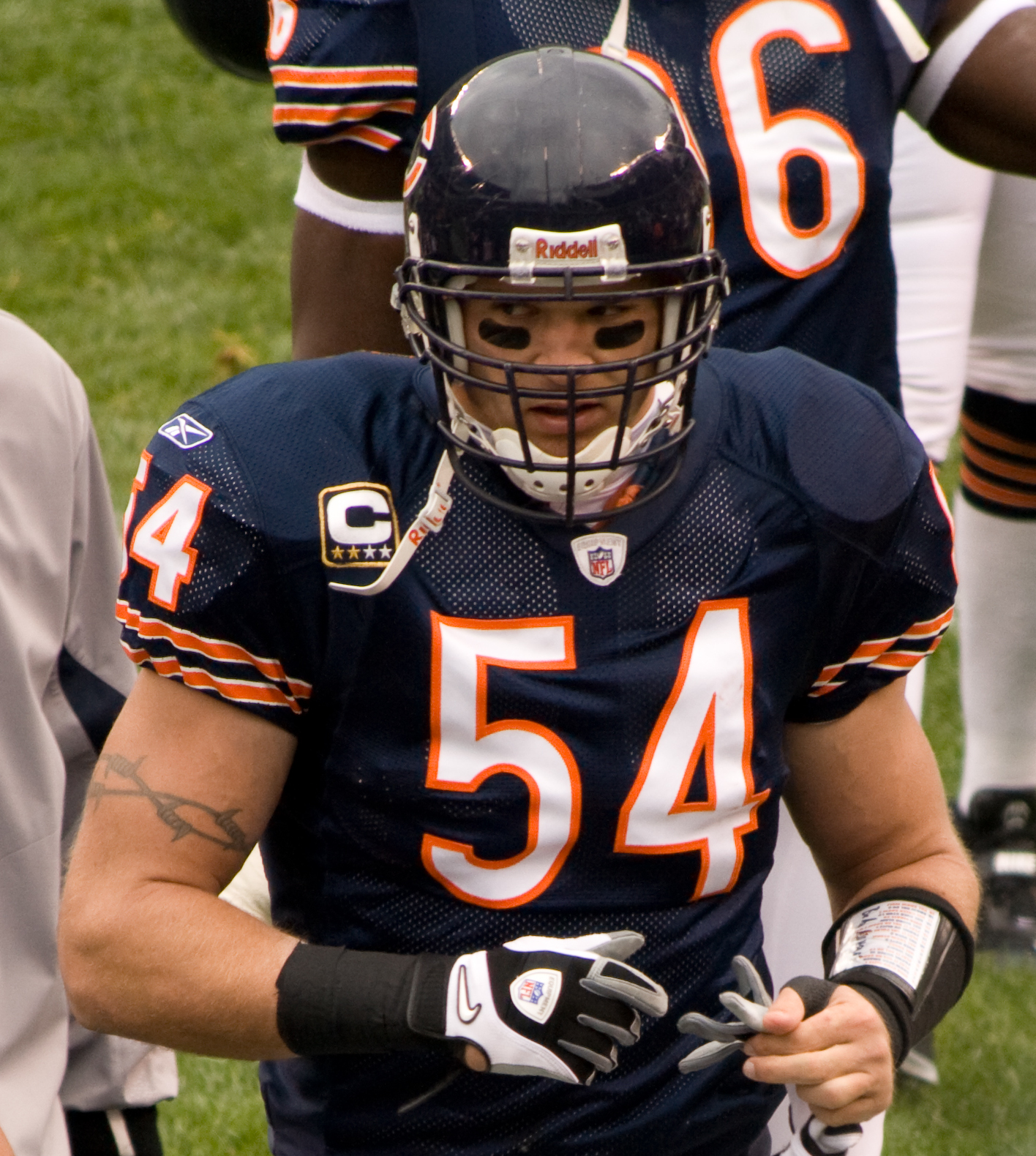
Urlacher in the Bears in 2008.

=== NFL draft ===
Pre-draft measurables
Height	Weight	Arm length	Hand span	40-yard dash	10-yard split	20-yard split	20-yard shuttle	Three-cone drill	Vertical jump	Broad jump	Bench press
6 ft 3 7/8 in (1.93 m)	258 lb (117 kg)	33 in (0.84 m)	9 7/8 in (0.25 m)	4.57 s	1.63 s	2.69 s	4.18 s	6.94 s	34 in (0.86 m)	10 ft 2 in (3.10 m)	27 reps
All values from NFL Scouting Combine

Urlacher was considered one of the most talented collegiate prospects in the 2000 NFL draft, and impressed spectators and analysts at the NFL Scouting Combine by bench pressing 225 pounds twenty-seven times and completing the forty-yard dash in 4.57 seconds. The Chicago Bears, who needed a defensive playmaker after having the 29th ranked defense in 1999, selected Urlacher in the first round as the ninth overall pick.

=== 2000–2004 ===
He signed a five-year contract, worth nearly eight million dollars with a five and a half million dollar signing bonus, within two months of the draft. Bears head coach Dick Jauron recognized Urlacher's versatility as a middle and outside linebacker and appointed him as the team's starting strongside linebacker. However, Urlacher struggled to perform consistently in his first game and lost his starting position to Rosevelt Colvin. Jauron left Urlacher on the sidelines during the following week as the Tampa Bay Buccaneers shut out the Bears, 41–0.

He managed to regain a starting spot on the Bears roster after Barry Minter, the team's veteran middle linebacker, was forced to miss the week 3 game on account of an injury. Urlacher excelled at the middle linebacker position, and recorded 46 tackles, six sacks, and one interception in his next five starts. He suffered a rib cage injury during this period but still won the league's Rookie Defensive Player of the Month in October. He led the Bears with 124 tackles and eight sacks, both of which surpassed the franchise's previous rookie records. Although the Bears finished with a disappointing 5–11 record, Urlacher received a number of individual accolades for his performance during the season. Many news organizations, such as the Associated Press and The Sporting News named him as the 2000 Defensive Rookie of the Year. Football fans across the nation also voted Urlacher to play at the 2001 Pro Bowl as an alternate middle linebacker. Urlacher's successful rookie campaign served as the foundation for his professional career and reputation.

Urlacher became one of the Bears' most productive playmakers during the 2001 season. He had one of the best games of his career on October 7 against the Atlanta Falcons in which he held Falcons quarterback Michael Vick, who was well known for his scrambling abilities, to just 18 rushing yards. He also recorded a forced fumble and sack, and returned one of Vick's fumbles for a 90-yard touchdown. Two weeks later, Urlacher helped set up a Bears comeback victory against the San Francisco 49ers by intercepting a pass, and later setting up a game-winning touchdown return for Mike Brown, after causing 49ers wide receiver Terrell Owens to lose control of a pass. He also caught a touchdown pass from punter Brad Maynard off a fake field goal attempt against the Washington Redskins in week 14, which clinched a first-round bye. Urlacher concluded the season with three interceptions, six sacks, and was a candidate for 2001 NFL Defensive Player of the Year Award. Football Digest named Urlacher their publication's defensive player of the year. The 2001 Chicago Bears won 13 games, marking the team's best finish since 1986, but lost to the Philadelphia Eagles in the NFC Divisional Playoffs.

The Bears' 2001 winning season would be followed by three straight losing seasons. As a result, the Bears fired Jauron and hired Lovie Smith before the 2004 NFL season. After the Bears started the season on the lower rungs of the NFC North, Urlacher suffered several injuries that sidelined him for a majority of the season.

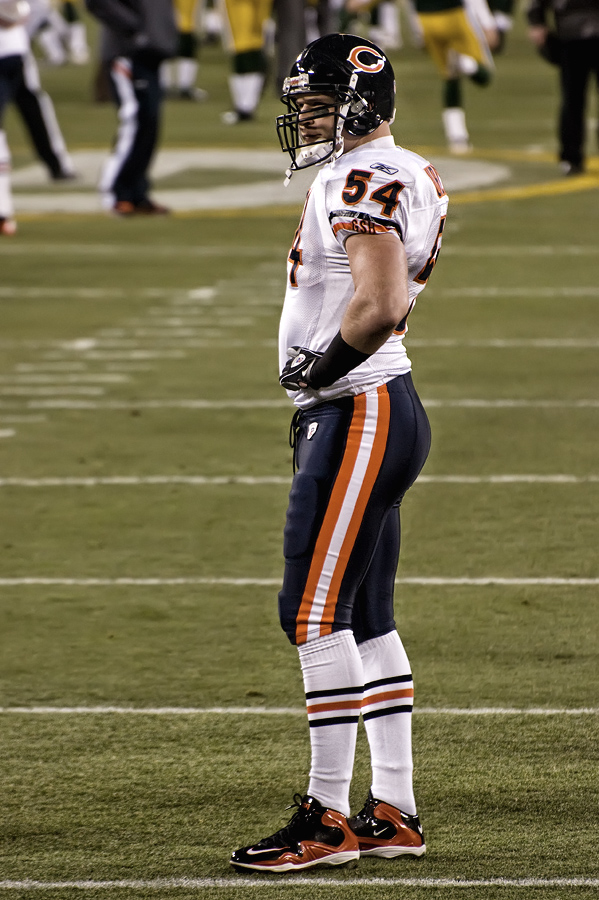
Urlacher in 2011.

=== 2005–2011 ===
In 2005, Urlacher won the NFL Defensive Player of the Year after playing for a defensive team that allowed the fewest points per game, and created the most turnovers in the National Football Conference. Urlacher himself recorded at least 10 tackles in six consecutive games, while finishing the season with a team high 121 tackles. He was also credited as one of the team's leaders, whose audibles and experience helped develop several younger teammates. Urlacher led the Bears to an 11–5 record, marking their best finish since 2001. Urlacher played his second career playoff game against the Carolina Panthers on January 15, 2006. He recorded seven tackles and one interception in a 29–21 loss. Urlacher was also selected to the 2006 Pro Bowl, but declined the position on account of an injury.

The team continued their resurgence into the 2006 season, finishing with a record of 13–3. During the season, Urlacher had one of the best performances of his professional career against the Arizona Cardinals. He helped the Bears overcome a 20-point deficit by recording 19 tackles and a forced fumble that was returned for a touchdown. Teammate Devin Hester commented on Urlacher's performance, stating, "We watched the film and everybody was saying that he just turned into the Incredible Hulk the last four minutes of the game, just killing people and running over and tackling whoever had the ball." The Bears won the NFC Championship against the New Orleans Saints 39–14, but lost Super Bowl XLI to the Indianapolis Colts 29–17. Urlacher finished the season with 93 tackles and three forced fumbles. He was elected to the 2006 All-Pro Team and 2007 Pro Bowl, while also earning consideration for the League's Defensive Player of the Year award.

The Bears were unable to replicate their success in the 2007 season, and finished last in the NFC North. In the middle of the season, Urlacher admitted that he had been suffering from an arthritic back, but later claimed the ailment was not serious. Nevertheless, he finished the season on a high note, registering five interceptions, five sacks, one fumble recovery, 123 tackles, and a defensive touchdown. Following the season's conclusion, Urlacher received minor neck surgery to treat his arthritic back. During the offseason, Urlacher revised his contract with the Bears, who granted him a $6 million signing bonus with a $1 million increase in salary each of the next four years.

Urlacher dislocated his wrist in the 2009 season opener against the Packers. He underwent surgery, and went on to miss the remainder of the season. Urlacher had severely damaged a bone in his wrist that was adjacent to a major nerve. Urlacher was forced to wear a cast on his wrist for 12 weeks and spend a month in therapy to recover from the injury. The Bears began to struggle on offense and defense. As frustration built, Urlacher criticized the Bears offense, stating that the addition of quarterback Jay Cutler had changed the team's identity. The Bears, who have historically employed a strong running game, were beginning to rely more on the pass on offense. He went on to say, "Kyle Orton might not be the flashiest quarterback, but the guy is a winner, and that formula worked for us. I hate to say it, but that's the truth." Urlacher and Cutler later made amends. The Bears finished the season with a 7–9 record, and missed the playoffs for the third consecutive year.

After recovering from the injury, Urlacher stated, "I feel more powerful. I'm running to the football, my keys are a lot more clear now, and I'm playing downhill. ... So I think it did help my body kind of calm down and relax a little bit." During the 2010 offseason, Bears general manager Jerry Angelo bolstered the team's defense by signing free agent Julius Peppers.

With Peppers' help, Urlacher and the Bears improved to an 11–5 record in the 2010 NFL season, winning the NFC North and earning a first-round bye for the 2011 playoffs. After leading the NFC in tackles (49) during the period, Urlacher was recognized as the NFC Defensive Player of the Month during December/January. It was the first time winning the award in his career. In the playoffs, the Bears beat the Seattle Seahawks in the divisional round, before falling to the division rival Green Bay Packers in the NFC Championship game. Urlacher was also voted to his seventh Pro Bowl for his stellar defensive efforts during the year. He was ranked 49th by his fellow players on the NFL Top 100 Players of 2011.

In 2011, in week 17 against the Minnesota Vikings, Urlacher sprained his MCL when teammate Major Wright and Vikings receiver Percy Harvin landed on him with 5:15 left in the game. Urlacher was eventually named to the Pro Bowl, but did not play due to the injury against Minnesota. He missed much of the team's summer practice OTA's while trying to recover from the injury. On August 14, 2012, Urlacher had an arthroscopic debridement procedure on his left knee, and stated that his goal was to play in the 2012 season opener. He eventually practiced on September 3, and played against the Colts in the season opener, though he sat out the second half.

=== 2012: Final season and retirement ===
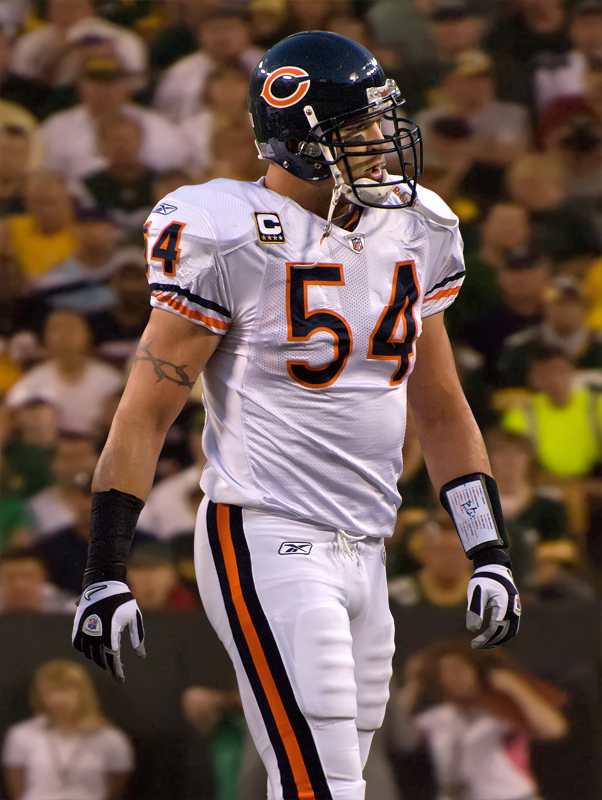
Urlacher in 2009

In 2012, Urlacher won the Ed Block Courage Award, given to those who showed a commitment to sportsmanship and courage. During his award acceptance speech, Urlacher thanked the Bears for their support after his mother Lavoyda Lenard died. Against the Tennessee Titans in week 9, Urlacher intercepted Matt Hasselbeck and returned the pick 46 yards for a touchdown. Urlacher led the Bears in tackles until week 13 against the Seahawks, in which he sustained a hamstring injury that sidelined him for the remainder of the season. Urlacher became an unrestricted free agent on March 12, 2013. On March 20, the Bears announced that Urlacher would not return in 2013 after the two sides failed to reach an agreement on a new contract. Urlacher later belittled Phil Emery's contract negotiations with him and stated the Bears had little intention to re-sign him. In 2015, Urlacher told ESPN that he still respected the Bears organization and front office, but has yet to speak to Emery, who was fired in 2014.

On May 22, 2013, Urlacher announced his retirement via his Twitter account. In 182 games in the NFL, Urlacher started all but two, the third most in franchise history behind Walter Payton (184) and Olin Kreutz (183), recording a team-record 1,779 tackles, 41.5 sacks, 22 interceptions, 16 fumble recoveries, and 11 forced fumbles.

=== Legacy ===
Following his successful rookie season, Urlacher was able to gain popularity with the fans. On a national level, Urlacher's jersey sales have rivaled those of other NFL superstars, such as Brett Favre and Michael Vick. Football fans across the nation have also voted Urlacher into eight Pro Bowls. Urlacher's teammates and coaches have also praised his character and athletic ability. In 2007, former teammate Tank Johnson called upon Urlacher to testify during one of his court hearings.

Even after winning the NFL Defensive Player of the Year Award for the 2005 season, a 2006 Sports Illustrated poll of 361 NFL players named Urlacher the second most overrated player in the league behind Terrell Owens. In response, Urlacher has stated "Just watch the film. I don't know what people are saying, but I'm not too worried about it anymore. All I can do is go out there and play hard and try and help my team win, and that's what I'm going to keep doing."

Although the Bears stopped retiring jersey numbers in 2013, Urlacher's No. 54 was kept out of circulation by the team for 13 years following his retirement. Rookie center Logan Jones was assigned the number in 2026, which he felt was "supporting [Urlacher's] memory and letting everybody see the legacy he left." Urlacher clarified the Bears did not need to ask him for permission to resume using No. 54 since it was freely available, but appreciated being informed of the news by Bears chairman George McCaskey and was "happy Logan will be repping it".

On November 21, 2017, Urlacher was announced as one of 27 semi-finalists for the 2018 Pro Football Hall of Fame class. The nomination was Urlacher's first, and came in his first year of eligibility. On February 3, 2018, Urlacher was voted into the Pro Football Hall of Fame.

== Other work ==
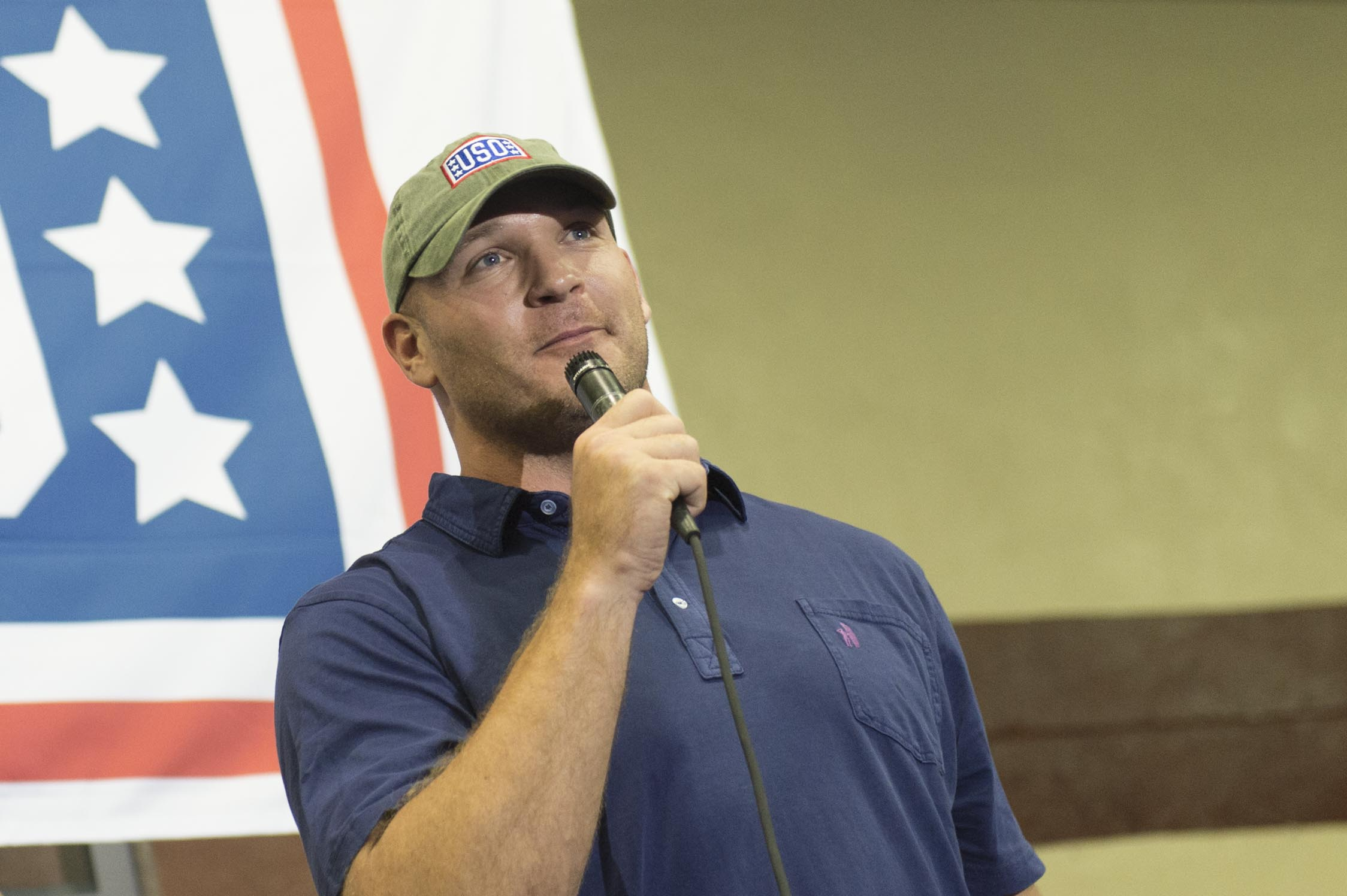
Urlacher at the Incirlik Air Base in 2014

In 2002, Urlacher appeared on the game show Wheel of Fortune and won over $47,000 for charity.

In May 2002, Urlacher appeared in an episode of According to Jim as himself. The episode was titled No Surprises (season 1, episode 22) and aired on May 15, 2002.

Urlacher has appeared in several commercials for McDonald's, Domino's Pizza, Comcast, Nike, Campbell's Chunky soup, Old Spice, and Glacéau. He also shared the spotlight with Peyton Manning in a MasterCard commercial at a spa. Nike also aired special commercials about Urlacher's high school career containing clips and commentary of plays he made. However, Urlacher later stated that he feels "uncomfortable" appearing in commercials. During media day before Super Bowl XLI Urlacher wore a hat promoting Glacéau vitamin water, a non-NFL approved sponsor, for which he was fined US$100,000.

Urlacher wrestled in a pay-per-view event for the NWA-TNA promotion. The Bears organization discovered this and forced him to stop.

In 2012, with Nike taking over the NFL supplier from Reebok, Urlacher modeled for the new uniforms. In July 2013, Urlacher announced that he will be an analyst for Fox Sports 1 on Fox Football Daily with Jay Glazer and Curt Menefee; he had been courted by NFL Network but decided on Fox Sports. On September 16, 2014, Urlacher resigned from the role to spend more time with his family.

In December 2014, Urlacher participated in the USO Chairman's Holiday tour, which provided entertainment to US troops in five countries around the world.

Urlacher has also been spokesperson for several companies. Sega Sports selected Urlacher to appear on the cover of NFL 2K3, while other companies, such as Nike, McDonald's, Old Spice, and Vitamin Water, have featured him in several television advertisements and promotions.

In 2014, Urlacher underwent a hair transplant surgery performed by RESTORE Hair. He became a spokesman for the Illinois-based clinic and appeared on billboards and television. Urlacher later sued a Florida-based hair transplant clinic for using his image and likeness without his consent.

== NFL career statistics ==
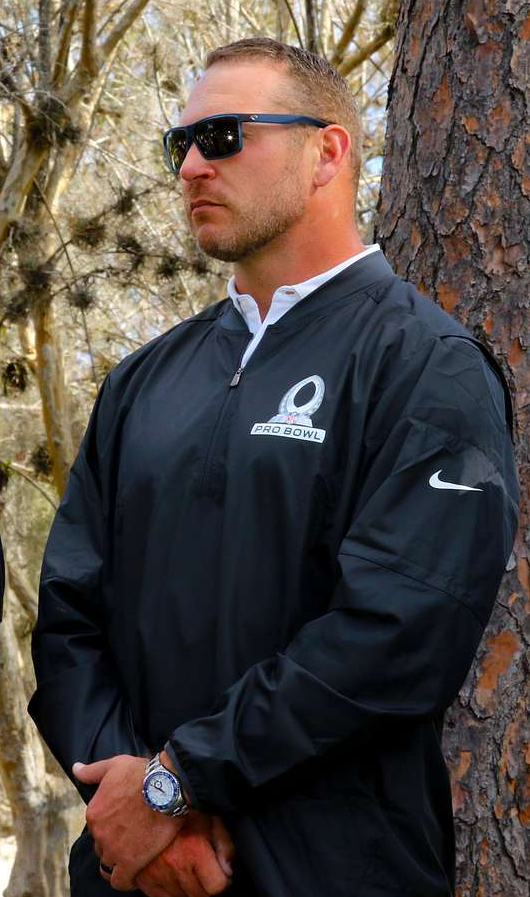
Urlacher in 2019

Legend
	NFL Defensive Player of the Year
**Bold**	Career high

Year	Team	GP	Tackles					Interceptions				Fumbles			Rec TD
Year	Team	GP	Cmb	Solo	Ast	Sck	Yds	Int	Yds	PD	TD	FF	FR	TD	Rec TD
2000	CHI	16	124	98	26	**8.0**	**49**	2	19	5	0	0	1	0	0
2001	CHI	16	118	91	27	6.0	37	3	60	8	0	**2**	**2**	**1**	**1**
2002	CHI	16	**153**	**117**	36	4.5	34	1	0	7	0	**2**	**2**	0	0
2003	CHI	16	115	86	29	2.5	15	0	0	4	0	0	0	0	0
2004	CHI	9	72	54	18	5.5	19	1	42	7	0	**2**	0	0	0
2005	CHI	16	122	98	24	6.0	44	0	0	5	0	1	0	0	0
2006	CHI	16	142	93	**49**	0.0	0	3	38	9	0	1	1	0	0
2007	CHI	16	123	93	30	5.0	36	**5**	**101**	**12**	**1**	0	**2**	0	0
2008	CHI	16	93	79	14	0.0	0	2	11	9	0	0	1	0	0
2009	CHI	1	3	3	0	0.0	0	0	0	0	0	0	0	0	0
2010	CHI	16	126	97	29	4.0	19	1	0	10	0	1	**2**	0	0
2011	CHI	16	102	84	18	0.0	0	3	7	7	0	0	**2**	**1**	0
2012	CHI	12	68	53	15	0.0	0	1	46	7	**1**	**2**	**2**	0	0
Career		182	1,361	1,046	315	41.5	252	22	324	90	2	11	15	2	1

== Personal life ==
Urlacher has two daughters, Pamela and Riley, with ex-wife Laurie Urlacher and a son, Kennedy, with Tyna Robertson. Kennedy is a safety for the USC Trojans.

In June 2005, Urlacher filed suit to establish paternity of his son Kennedy. Genetic testing determined that he is Kennedy's father. Kennedy's mother, Tyna Robertson, was already well known to the media, having made claims of sexual assault against famed dancer Michael Flatley and a doctor from Naperville, Illinois. Urlacher and Robertson maintain joint custody over Kennedy. In 2017, Urlacher appealed to a Cook County court to remove Kennedy from Robertson's custody after her husband, Ryan Karageorge, was shot and killed in their residence.

In 2011, Urlacher's mother Lavoyda Lenard Urlacher died, and Urlacher was granted temporary leave from the team, returning in time for the season opener. His younger brother, Casey, had a brief career in the Arena Football League and was later elected mayor of Mettawa, Illinois, in 2013.

In April 2012, Urlacher began dating model and actress Jenny McCarthy. In August 2012, McCarthy announced that she and Urlacher had ended their relationship. Urlacher married Jennipher Frost, a former contestant on America's Next Top Model on March 13, 2016.

Urlacher enjoys golfing in his spare time, and during an episode of Home Turf, he revealed a room in his mansion containing a trove of golf paraphernalia. When home, Urlacher revealed that he also enjoys watching the Discovery Channel, National Geographic, and HBO's Entourage, in which he once made a cameo. Urlacher enjoys listening to a wide variety of music, including hip hop, rock, and country music.

On August 27, 2020, Urlacher made a post to his Instagram story criticizing NBA players for boycotting playoff games over the police shooting of Jacob Blake in Kenosha, Wisconsin, and "liked" a now-deleted post supporting shooting suspect Kyle Rittenhouse and stating "Patriot Lives Matter," generating significant news and opinion coverage. The Bears responded to the posts, stating, "The social media posts in no way reflect the values or opinions of the Chicago Bears organization."
