= Chad Eisele =

American collegiate sports administrator

Current position
- Title: Athletic director
- Team: Hampden–Sydney
- Conference: ODAC

Biographical details
- Education: Knox (IL) (1993)

Playing career

Football
- 1989–1992: Knox (IL)
- Position: Defensive back

Coaching career (HC unless noted)

Football
- 1993: Knox (IL) (DB)
- 1997–1999: Lake Forest (DC)
- 2000–2004: Lake Forest
- 2005: Minnesota State–Moorhead
- 2010–2012: Knox (IL)

Tennis
- 1998–2002: Lake Forest
- 2006–2008: Knox (IL)

Golf
- 2018–present: Hampden–Sydney

Administrative career (AD unless noted)
- 2006–2017: Knox (IL)
- 2017–present: Hampden–Sydney

Head coaching record
- Overall: 35–56 (football)
- Tournaments: Football; 0–1 (NCAA D-III playoffs)

Accomplishments and honors

Championships
- Football; 1 MWC (2002)

Chad Eisele is an American college athletics administrator, golf coach, and former American football coach. He is the athletic director and head men's golf coach at Hampden–Sydney College in Hampden Sydney, Virginia. Eisele served as the head football coach at Lake Forest College in Lake Forest, Illinois from 2000 to 2004, Minnesota State University Moorhead in 2005, and at his alma mater, Knox College, in Galesburg, Illinois from 2010 to 2012, compiling career college football coaching record of 35–56.

== Head coaching record ==
=== Football ===
Year	Team	Overall	Conference	Standing	Bowl/playoffs
Lake Forest Foresters (Midwest Conference) (2000–2004)
2000	Lake Forest	3–7	3–6	T–6th	
2001	Lake Forest	4–6	4–4	T–5th	
2002	Lake Forest	9–2	8–1	T–1st	L NCAA Division III First Round
2003	Lake Forest	7–3	6–3	3rd	
2004	Lake Forest	8–2	7–2	3rd	
Lake Forest:		31–20	28–16		
Minnesota State–Moorhead Dragons (Northern Sun Intercollegiate Conference) (2005)
2005	Minnesota State–Moorhead	1–9	1–6	T–6th	
Minnesota State–Moorhead:		1–9	1–6		
Knox Prairie Fire (Midwest Conference) (2010–2012)
2010	Knox	1–9	1–8	10th	
2011	Knox	0–10	0–9	10th	
2012	Knox	2–8	2–7	T–8th	
Knox:		3–27	3–24		
Total:		35–56			
National championship Conference title Conference division title or championship game berth
