= Midwest Young Artists Conservatory =

- Orchestra
- Short name: MYAC
- Founded: 1993
- Location: Chicago, Illinois

MYAC's Symphony Orchestra performs "Songe d'une nuit du sabbat", the fifth and final movement of Symphonie Fanstastique by Hector Berlioz. Conducted by Dr. Allan Dennis. This performance was part of Inspire Brilliance held at Pick-Staiger Concert Hall on October 18th, 2015.

Midwest Young Artists Conservatory (MYAC) is a youth music and jazz organization based near Chicago, Illinois. It is the largest youth ensemble music program in the Midwest.

MYAC was founded in 1993 in Evanston, Illinois, by Dr. Allan Dennis and consisted of a single orchestra. Since then, MYAC has grown considerably; it now includes six youth symphony orchestras, 65+ chamber ensembles, a jazz and big band program, four choral groups, and an entry-level early childhood music program for very young children.

MYAC also has a sizable chamber music program. The organization is based at the MYAC Center in Fort Sheridan in Highwood, Illinois. As of 2017, enrollment is around 1000 student musicians from 78 cities throughout the Chicago metropolitan area.

MYAC performances are held at Harris Theater and Jay Pritzker Pavilion in Millennium Park, Symphony Center in Chicago, Pick-Staiger Auditorium at Northwestern University, the Ravinia Festival and the Hot House jazz facility. In 2007, Midwest Young Artists Conservatory became the first youth orchestra ever to perform at the Civic Opera House in Chicago. Each year, Midwest Young Artists Conservatory hosts the Walgreens National Concerto Competition, for young soloists, and the Discover National Chamber Music Competition, for young string, brass, percussion and wind ensembles.

In March 2019, MYAC was named the 2019 Youth Orchestra of the Year by the Illinois Council of Orchestras, the fourth time in the organization's 30-year history.

== Ensembles ==
Midwest Young Artists Conservatory has six principal orchestras, ranked by skill level and age:

- Reading Orchestra
- Cadet Orchestra
- Concertino Orchestra
- Philharmonia Orchestra
- Concert Orchestra
- Symphony Orchestra

MYAC has four main jazz ensembles, as well as a number of smaller jazz combos.

- Big Band
- Jazz Orchestra
- Jazz Workshop
- Jazz Ensemble

MYAC has 3 choral ensembles

- Maestros
- Voices Rising
- Vocal Point
