= James R. Getz =

American real estate manager and investor

James R. Getz, 1929

James Rankin Getz (August 18, 1910—February 15, 1986) was a real estate broker and investor and the founding president of the village of Mettawa, Illinois, from 1961 to 1980.

== Biography ==
James R. Getz was born on August 18, 1910, in Chicago, Illinois, to parents Susan Daniela Rankin and George Fulmer Getz. He had an older brother, George F. Getz Jr.

Getz was a member of Class of 1929 of the Choate School in Wallingford, Connecticut, and received his Bachelor's degree from Yale University in New Haven, Connecticut in 1933. In May 1935, Getz married Betsy Needham.The couple had five children: Susan, Sally, Elizabeth, Ann, and James R. Jr. Beginning in 1939, the Getz family lived in Lake Forest, Illinois, in a home designed by architect Walter Frazier. Getz then worked as vice president for the Globe Coal Company, founded by his father in 1901, and for its next evolution, Globe Corporation, a manufacturing and then real estate business based in Deerfield, Illinois. In the 1960s, he was a director and finance committee member of the George Getz corporation.

In January 1960, Getz and partners incorporated the village of Mettawa, west of Lake Forest, initially with a population of just 117 (as of the 2020 census, it has grown to more than 530). From 1961 to 1980, Getz served as Mettawa's village board president. In 1962, Mettawa grew by 15 acres to a population of 250. The village was named for a local Potawatami Chief who befriended early Euro-American settlers before the 1833 Treaty of Chicago when the U.S. government forced Native Americans from the land. Getz helped establish the Illinois Archeological Survey in 1956 and the Lake Forest-Lake Bluff Historical Society in 1972, with a personal interest in the Native American history of the area. In 1984, newspapers reported on the development of a $350 million office-research park near Lake Forest dubbed 'Conway Farms,' co-owned by Getz and three partners, and resistance from locals concerned with urban sprawl.

Getz was a trustee of the Lake Forest Hospital, Lake Forest College, Brookfield Zoo, Newberry Library and the Chicago Historical Society. He directed the Lake County Historical Society, the Center for American Archaeology, and chairman of the Friends of the Lake Forest College Library. In 1968, he donated a 15-acre tract of Mettawa land to Lake Forest College for use in ecology study.

Getz died on February 15, 1986.
