= Lake County Forest Preserves =

Government agency in Illinois, U.S.

- Formation: 1958
- Type: Governmental organization
- Headquarters: 1899 W Winchester Rd, Libertyville, IL 60048
- Region served: Lake County, Illinois
- Main organ: Lake County Forest Preserves Board
- Website: lcfpd.org

The Lake County Forest Preserves is a government agency headquartered in Libertyville, Illinois, United States. It acts as principal guardian of Lake County's open space and natural areas since 1958. It is focused on preservation, restoration, education and recreation. It is the second largest forest preserve district in Illinois.

== History ==
In 1958, Ethel Untermyer moved from Chicago to Lake County and looked for a forest preserve near her as her son wanted to go exploring. She learned there were none. The next day, she began organizing a countywide referendum to start the Lake County Forest Preserve District. On election day in November 1958, the referendum passed with more than 60% of voter support. An advisory committee of citizens was formed, with Untermyer as its chair.

The Forest Preserves now manages and protects more than 31,900 acres (12,900 ha) of natural lands and more than 200 miles (320 km) of multiuse trails. Ethel's Woods Forest Preserve in Antioch, Illinois is named in honor of her efforts to establish the Lake County Forest Preserves.

In 1961 the first forest preserve opened in Lake County: Van Patten Woods in Wadsworth, Illinois.

== Board of Commissioners ==
A 19-member elected Board of Commissioners governs the Forest Preserves. They guide the agency's mission and approve all land acquisitions, restoration and improvement projects, educational and cultural programs, the annual budget and other administrative actions. These same officials also serve as County Board members, overseeing all other aspects of Lake County government.

== Regional trails ==
- Des Plaines River Trail & Greenway
- Millennium Trail

== Golf ==
The Forest Preserves manages three public golf courses. ThunderHawk Golf Club in Beach Park, Illinois, a top-ranked 228-acre course designed by American golf course architect Robert Trent Jones Jr., features wetlands and oak groves. Countryside Golf Club in Mundelein, Illinois offers two 18-hole courses. The Prairie Course has wide-open fairways, while the Traditional Course features narrow, tree-lined passages. Brae Loch Golf Club in Grayslake, Illinois, is a 70-acre course with rolling terrain.

== Energy efficiency ==
The Forest Preserves is committed to sustainable building practices with a focus on net-zero energy. The Ryerson Education Center in Riverwoods, Illinois, is a 2,900-square-foot net-zero energy facility that includes two classrooms, extra storage space, and a screened porch. It features a 23.8-kilowatt rooftop solar panel system, efficient HVAC, upgraded insulation and windows, LED lighting and bird-friendly glass. It is the first new net-zero energy public building in Lake County to receive certification from the Passive House Institute US (Phius). The Operations and Public Safety Facility in Lake Villa, Illinois exceeded lighting and envelope standards with efficient fixtures, daylighting and occupancy sensors. The Ryerson Welcome Center in Riverwoods, Illinois is Platinum LEED Certified and benefits from green infrastructure, a geoexchange system, and a solar panel array funded by a local grant.

== Properties ==
Boundaries of Lake County Forest Preserve Properties

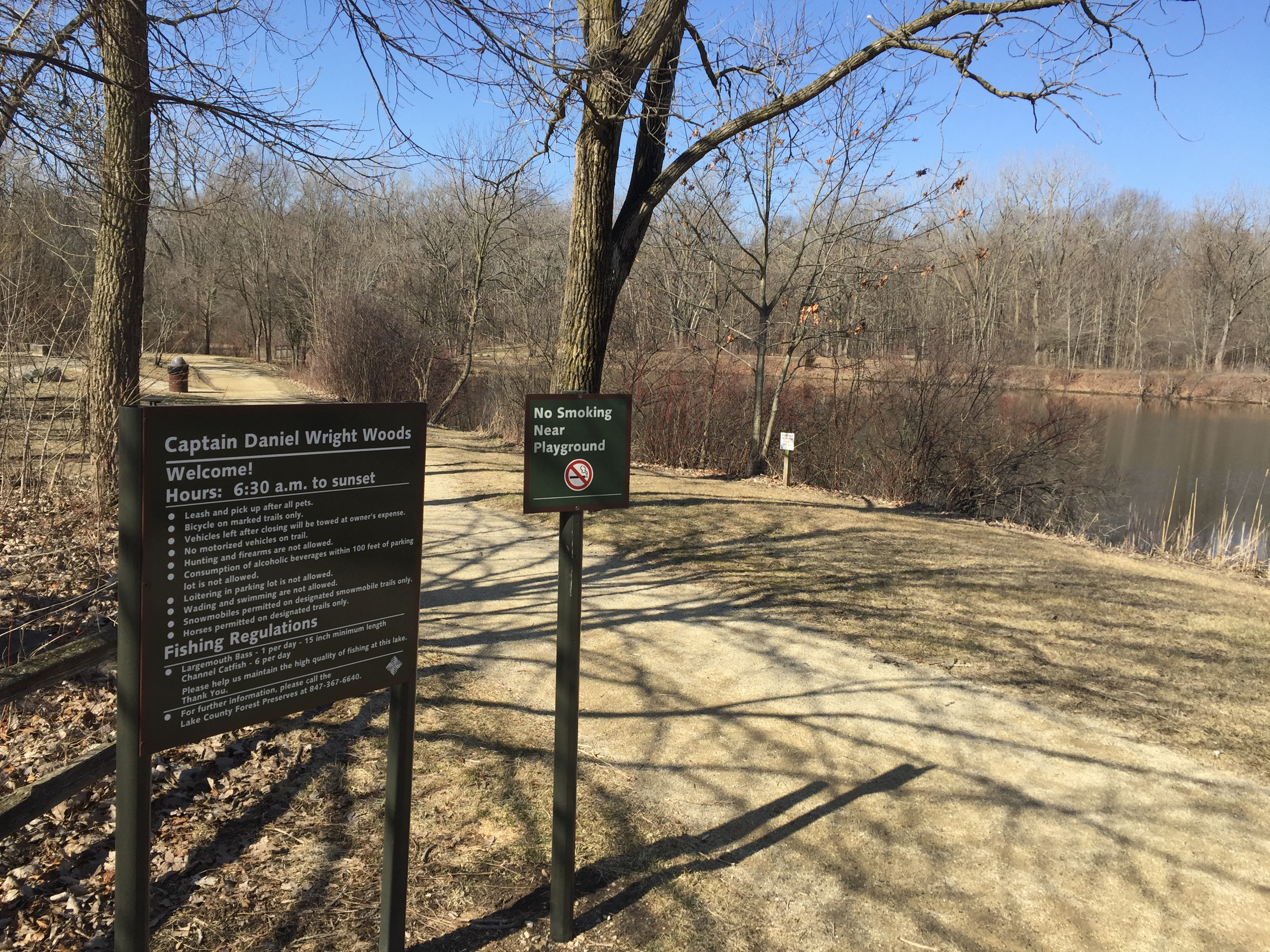
Captain Daniel Wright Woods

- Adlai E. Stevenson II Farm, a National Historic Landmark
- Almond Marsh
- Berkeley Prairie
- Bess Bower Dunn Museum (formerly Lake County Discovery Museum)
- Bonner Heritage Farm
- Buffalo Creek
- Captain Daniel Wright Woods
- Cuba Marsh
- Des Plaines River Trail
- Dog Sled Area
- Duck Farm
- Fort Hill Trail
- Fort Sheridan Forest Preserve
- Fourth Lake
- Fox River Preserve & Marina
- Gander Mountain
- Grainger Woods
- Grant Woods
- Grassy Lake
- Greenbelt Forest Preserve
- Greenbelt Cultural Center
- Half Day
- Hastings Lake
- Heron Creek
- Independence Grove & Visitors Center
- Lake Carina
- Lakewood
- Lyons Woods
- McDonald Woods
- Middlefork Savanna
- Millennium Trail
- Nippersink
- Oak Spring Road Canoe Launch (Wilmot Woods)
- Old School
- Prairie Wolf
- Raven Glen & Ethel's Woods
- Rollins Savanna
- Route 60 Canoe Launch
- Edward L. Ryerson Conservation Area & Welcome Center
- Singing Hills
- Spring Bluff (This preserve is part of the bi-state Chiwaukee Illinois Beach Lake Plain, a Ramsar Convention wetland)
- Sun Lake
- Van Patten Woods
- Wadsworth Road Canoe Launch
- Waukegan Savanna
- Wetlands Research Project
- Wilmot Woods
- Wright Woods
