= U.S. Route 60 in Illinois =

Segment of American highway

U.S. Route 60 and U.S. Route 62
- US 60 / US 62 highlighted in red

Route information
- Maintained by IDOT
- Length: 0.92 mi (1,480 m)

Major junctions
- West end: US 60 / US 62 at Missouri state line in Cairo
- East end: US 51 / US 60 / US 62 at Kentucky state line in Cairo

Location
- Country: United States
- State: Illinois
- Counties: Alexander

Highway system
- United States Numbered Highway System; List; Special; Divided; Illinois State Highway System; Interstate; US; State; Tollways; Scenic
← IL 59	US 60	→ IL 60
← IL 61	US 62	→ IL 62

U.S. Route 60 and U.S. Route 62 (US 60/US 62) run for a very short distance within the state of Illinois. The highways run concurrently for their entire existence within the state. The joint highway runs around Fort Defiance in Cairo, from the Cairo Mississippi River Bridge over the Mississippi River east to the Cairo Ohio River Bridge over the Ohio River; the Ohio River Bridge also carries US 51. The bridges cross the two rivers just north of the mouth of the Ohio.

== Route description ==
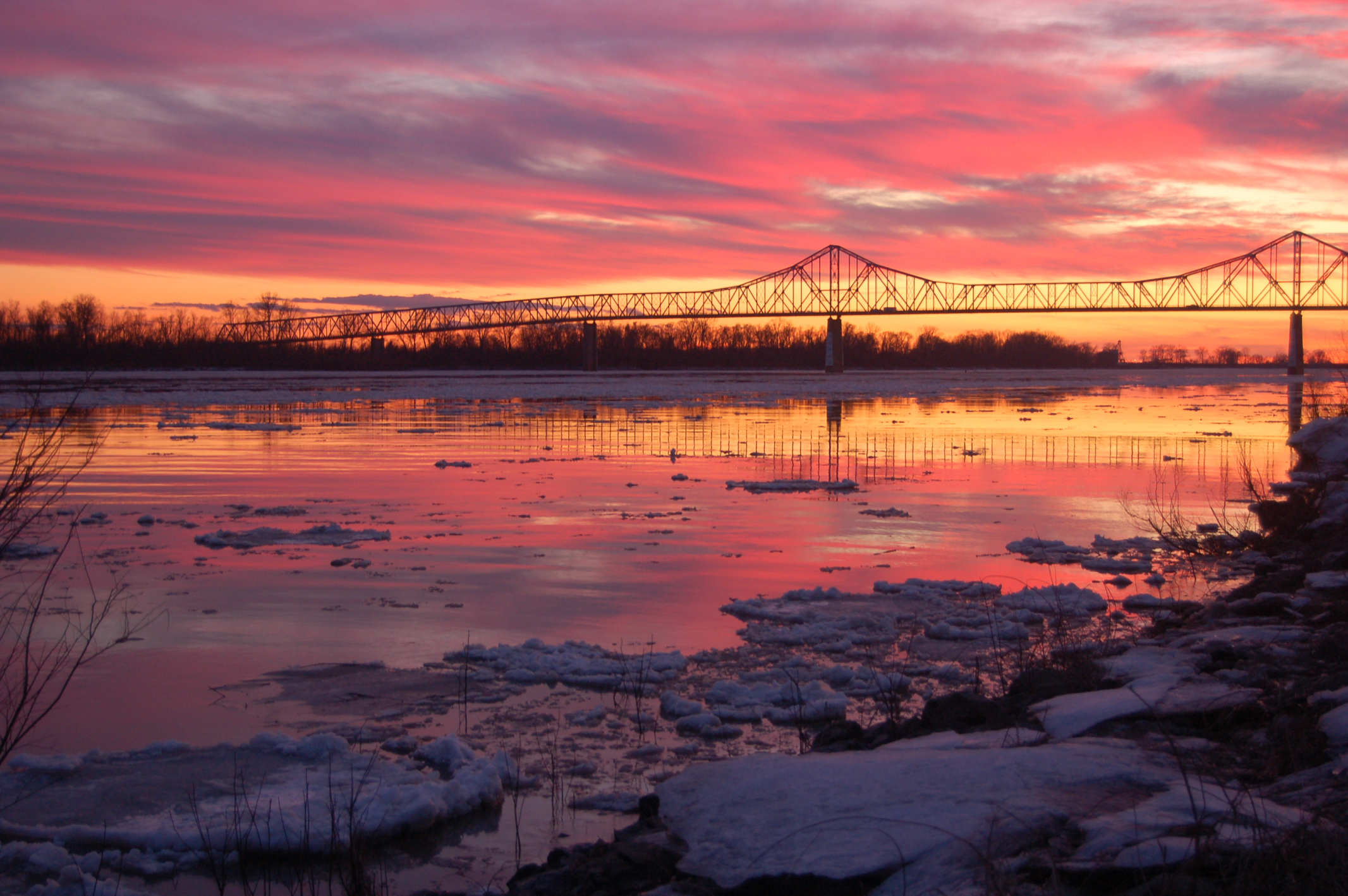
US 51/US 60/US 62 cross the Ohio River and land in Cairo near Fort Defiance

US 60/US 62 enters Illinois via the Cairo Mississippi River Bridge, a narrow, through truss bridge. The bridge deposits the highway onto a viaduct which rises above farmland in the alluvial plain. At the northern end of the causeway is the entrance to Fort Defiance Park, a former Civil War military post and later state park. Fort Defiance marks the confluence of the Mississippi and Ohio Rivers and Illinois' southernmost and lowest points. The lone intersection for US 60/US 62 is with US 51, which joins from the north. The three highway designations come together to head northeast and rise onto the Cairo Ohio River Bridge and into Kentucky.

The Great River Road's National Route overlaps US 60/US 62 from the intersection with US 51 to the Kentucky state line.

== History ==
Until the Mississippi River Bridge opened c. 1929, US 60 used a ferry directly from Bird's Point, Missouri, across that river (below the Ohio) to Wickliffe, Kentucky. After that it ran into Cairo and used a ferry from roughly 22nd Street to East Cairo, Kentucky. US 62 was designated around 1930, and the Ohio River Bridge replaced the ferry in 1937.

Originally, the Mississippi River bridge opened in 1929. It was a boon to economies of Southeast Missouri and Northern Arkansas. The toll drivers would have had to pay on the Mississippi bridge was $1.40 (equivalent to $26.35 in 2024).

Meanwhile, the Ohio River bridge was delayed. An Act of Congress gave them more time. It was eventually dedicated on November 11, 1938, and made toll free exactly ten years later. It had a cost of $3 million (equivalent to $52.3 million in 2024).

== Major intersections ==
The entire route is in Cairo, Alexander County.

mi	km	Destinations	Notes
0.00– 0.55	0.00– 0.89	US 60 west / US 62 west to I-57 south – Charleston, Sikeston	Continuation into Missouri
0.00– 0.55	0.00– 0.89	Cairo Mississippi River Bridge; Missouri–Illinois state line	
		Great River Road info / Lincoln Heritage Trail (Southern Branch) south (Ohio River Scenic Byway south)	Western end of Lincoln Heritage Trail concurrency
0.72	1.16	US 51 north / Great River Road (National Route) north / Lincoln Heritage Trail (Southern Branch) north (Ohio River Scenic Byway north) to I-57 north – Cairo	Eastern end of Lincoln Heritage Trail concurrency; western end of US 51/Great River Road concurrency
0.75– 0.92	1.21– 1.48	Cairo Ohio River Bridge; Illinois–Kentucky state line	
0.75– 0.92	1.21– 1.48	US 51 south / US 60 east / US 62 east / Great River Road (National Route) south – Paducah	Continuation into Kentucky
1.000 mi = 1.609 km; 1.000 km = 0.621 mi: Concurrency terminus

U.S. Route 60
Previous state: Missouri	Illinois	Next state: Kentucky

U.S. Route 62
Previous state: Missouri	Illinois	Next state: Kentucky
