= U.S. Route 62 =

Highway in the United States

U.S. Route 62
- Map of the United States with US 62 highlighted in red

Route information
- Length: 2,248 mi (3,618 km)
- Existed: 1930–present

Major junctions
- West end: US 85 at the Mexican border in El Paso, TX
- I-10 / US 180 in El Paso, TX; I-35 / I-40 / I-44 at Oklahoma City, OK; I-55 in Miner, MO; I-65 at Elizabethtown, KY; I-75 near Georgetown, KY; I-70 / I-71 at Columbus, OH; I-77 / US 30 at Canton, OH; I-80 at Hubbard, OH; I-79 at Mercer, PA; I-86 / NY 17 / Southern Tier Expressway at Kennedy, NY
- East end: NY 104 near the Canadian border in Niagara Falls, NY

Location
- Country: United States
- States: Texas, New Mexico, Oklahoma, Arkansas, Missouri, Illinois, Kentucky, Ohio, Pennsylvania, New York

Highway system
- United States Numbered Highway System; List; Special; Divided
← US 61	→ US 63

U.S. Route 62 or U.S. Highway 62 (US 62) is an east–west United States Highway in the southern and northeastern United States. It runs from the Mexican border at El Paso, Texas, to Niagara Falls, New York, near the Canadian border. It is the only east–west United States Numbered Highway that connects Mexico and Canada. Parts of US 62 follow what once was the Ozark Trail, including the historic bridge across the South Canadian River in Newcastle, Oklahoma.

This bridge was damaged beyond repair by the 2013 Moore tornado that struck Newcastle and Moore, Oklahoma. The highway is signed north–south in New York and Pennsylvania, reflecting its directional orientation in both states, and is signed east–west for the remainder of its course.

== Route description ==
Lengths
	mi	km
TX	403	649
NM	120	193
OK	402	647
AR	330	530
MO	87	140
IL	0.92	1.48
KY	391	629
OH	295	475
PA	119	192
NY	103	166
Total	2,252	3,624

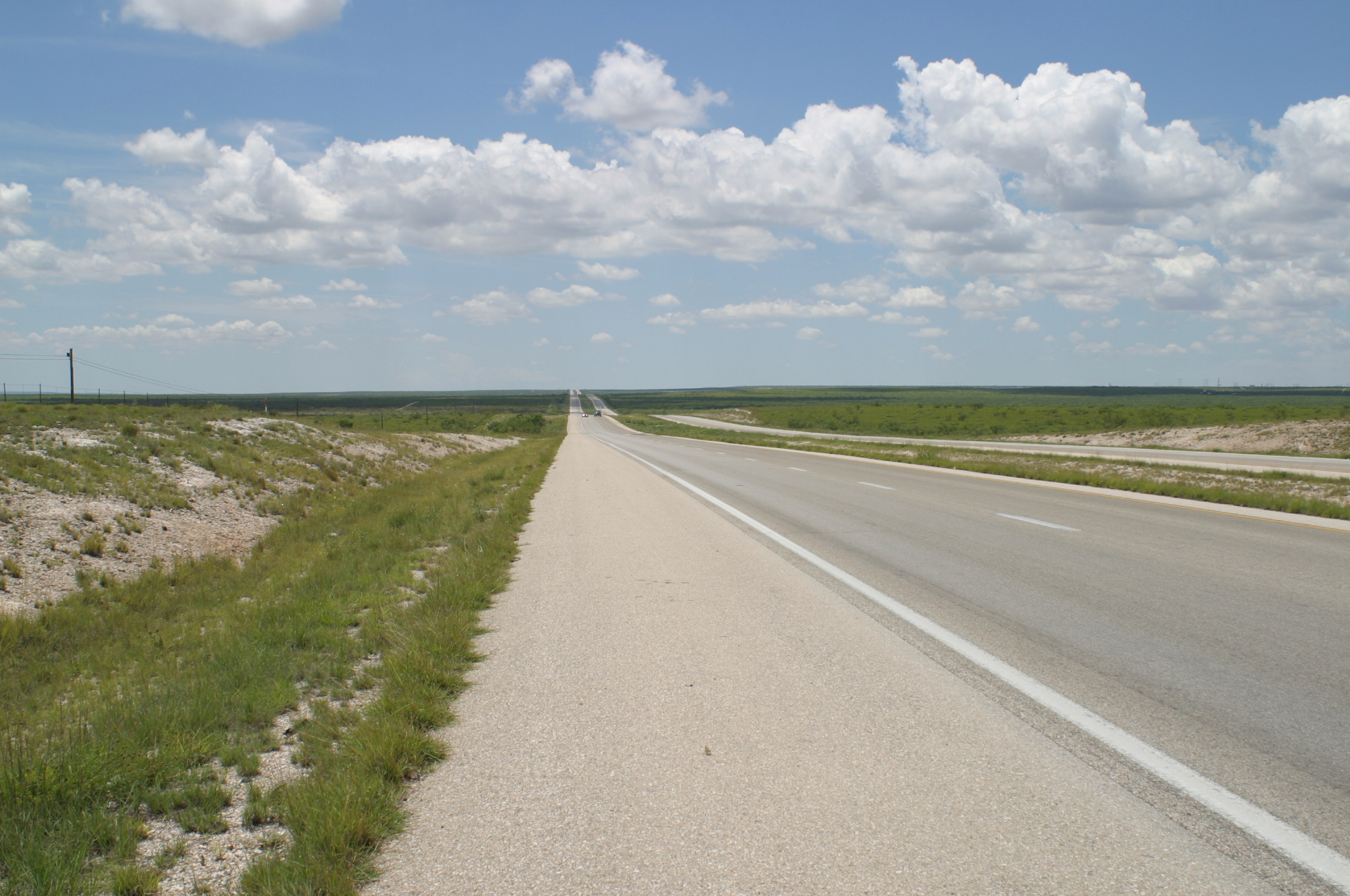
US 62 west of Hobbs, Lea County, New Mexico.

=== West Texas ===
US 62 has two separate segments in Texas, separated by a portion in New Mexico with the first section in Texas from its terminus in El Paso to the state line in the Guadalupe Mountains. Through El Paso, US 62 begins at the Santa Fe Street Bridge, and follows Santa Fe Street, then Paisano Drive.

At the Paisano Drive underpass for I-10 (I-10 exit 23B), US 62 runs concurrently with US 180, while US 180 ends its concurrency with I-10. The route then follows Montana Avenue, continuing the concurrency with US 180 until Seminole. Before exiting Texas, the route passes through the Salt Flats of Texas, the southern base of Guadalupe Peak, the highest point in Texas, and Guadalupe Mountains National Park.

=== New Mexico ===
Through New Mexico, US 62 is entirely concurrent with US 180. The highway continues past Carlsbad Caverns National Park and White's City into the city of Carlsbad. In Carlsbad, US 285 joins US 62/US 180 for approximately 2.2 miles (3.5 km), then heads east to Hobbs. US 62 comes within 12 miles (19 km) of the WIPP Plant while also coming across several State Highway termini: New Mexico State Road 360 (NM 360), NM 176, NM 243, NM 529, NM 483, and NM 8 along the 70-mile (110 km) stretch. US 62 comes into Hobbs along Marland Boulevard. After coming close to Hobbs High School's Watson Stadium, US 62 leaves Hobbs going east to the Texas–New Mexico state line.

=== Texas Panhandle ===
After re-entering Texas, US 62 continues east through Seminole where US 180 heads east towards Lamesa and US 62 turns north northeast along a concurrency with US 385 through Seagraves and Brownfield. In Brownfield, US 62 picks up US 82/US 380 from Plains for a four-way concurrency for about two blocks, where US 380 heads east toward Tahoka. US 385 drops off approximately 1.5 miles (2.4 km) later to head northwest toward Levelland. US 82 continues as a concurrency with US 62 into Lubbock.

US 62 splits from US 82 and joins with State Highway 114 (SH 114) for approximately 10 miles (16 km) along the campus of Texas Tech University's southern border. On the east side of Lubbock, US 82 joins back into US 62/SH 114 and then continues east passes through Lorenzo, then leaves off the concurrency and forms a spur around Ralls, locally known as the "US 62 Loop".

The route then turns north to form a concurrency with SH 207 up to Floydada, where US 70 joins in for one mile (1.6 km) east and then SH 207 turns north of the east side of Floydada. US 62/US 70 then east through Matador to Paducah, and north again dropping off US 70 and gaining US 83 through Childress to a point 17 miles (27 km) to the north of Childress where it turns east alone, before crossing the Texas–Oklahoma border five miles (8.0 km) west of Hollis.

=== Oklahoma ===
US 62 runs east from the Texas border across Southwest Oklahoma through Hollis, Gould and Altus and then continues east bypassing the communities of Headrick, Snyder, Indiahoma and Cache into Lawton. On the north side of Lawton, US 62 joins I-44 as a concurrent route for eight miles (13 km) through the Fort Sill Military Reservation and then splits on its own at Exit 46 near Medicine Park to continue north through Apache then north and east toward Anadarko.

From Anadarko, US 62 runs east through Verden to Chickasha and northeast through Blanchard and then Newcastle before returning to a concurrent route with I-44 into Oklahoma City and then with I-240 and I-35 through much of the city before leaving I-35 at Northeast 23rd Street (exit 130) two miles (3.2 km) east of the Oklahoma State Capitol. It leaves Oklahoma City at 23rd street and heads east through Midwest City, Spencer, Nicoma Park, Choctaw, Harrah, Meeker and Boley to Okemah. At Okemah, US 62 overlaps I-40 for 18 miles (29 km) to Henryetta. US 62 then leaves I-40 to continue north to Okmulgee and east to Muskogee, and heads northeast through Fort Gibson and Tahlequah and into Arkansas.

In addition to sections of I-44, I-240, I-35 and I-40, US 62 also runs concurrent with other US highways over its miles across Oklahoma including US 281 from Lawton to Anadarko and US 277 from Lawton north about 11 miles (both including the 8-mile (13 km) I-44 concurrency north of Lawton), US 81 in the Chickasha city limits, a second US 277 concurrency from Chickasha to Newcastle, US 75 from Henryetta to Okmulgee, US 64 from an intersection near Taft to Muskogee and US 69 in the Muskogee city limits. US 62 business routes are designated through the cities of Snyder and Muskogee.

=== Arkansas ===
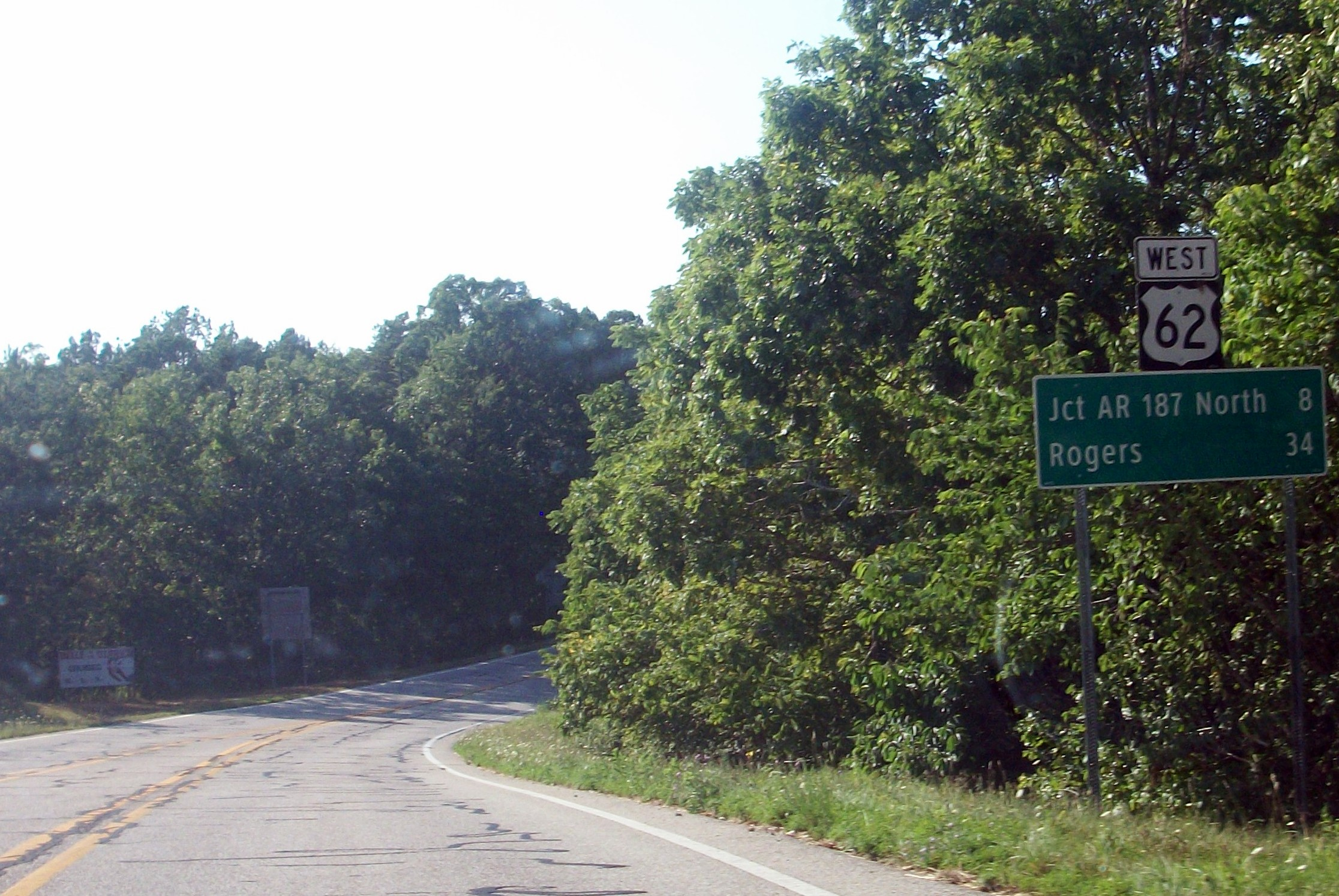
US 62 in Carroll County west of Eureka Springs, Arkansas.

In the state of Arkansas, US 62 runs 329.9 miles (530.9 km) from the Oklahoma border near Summers east to the Missouri border in St. Francis, serving the northern portion of the state. The route passes through several cities and towns, including Fayetteville, Springdale, Bentonville, and Rogers. US 62 runs concurrently with several highways in Arkansas including I-49 and US 71 between Fayetteville and Bentonville, US 412 through much of the state, US 65 in the Harrison area, and with US 63 and US 67 (Future I-57 corridor) in northeast Arkansas.

=== Missouri ===
US 62 enters Missouri from Arkansas at Whitaker Place, and proceeds more or less easterly across the Missouri Bootheel via Malden to New Madrid. Between Malden and New Madrid, US 62 was designated as Route 82 in 1922. The part southwest of Campbell was designated as Route 93 in 1930. The part from Malden to Campbell was unnumbered until it became US 62. At New Madrid US 62 begins a concurrency with US 61. The combined US 61/62 goes north as far as Sikeston, where US 62 resumes its easterly direction. From Sikeston US 62 runs east to Charleston, where it is concurrent with Business I-57 for a short distance. After crossing I-57, US 62 becomes concurrent with US 60, this concurrency continues until US 60/62 leaves Missouri by way of the Mississippi River bridge into Cairo, Illinois.

=== Illinois ===
US 62 overlaps US 60 for its entire length, 0.92 miles (1.48 km), in Illinois. It crosses Illinois at its very southern tip between the Mississippi and Ohio rivers at Cairo. US 62 enters Illinois from Missouri by means of a bridge over the Mississippi River, turning east at US 51 with US 51 joining the concurrency. The three routes immediately cross into Kentucky via the Cairo Ohio River Bridge.

=== Kentucky ===
US 62 runs right through the tourist section of Western Kentucky; between the cities of Paducah and Eddyville, it passes Kentucky Lake and Lake Barkley, two large manmade lakes. From there US 62 heads east through the cities of Princeton, Central City, Beaver Dam, Leitchfield, Elizabethtown, Bardstown, Lawrenceburg and Midway.

For much of this portion, US 62 is paralleled by portions of the Kentucky Parkway System, including the Western Kentucky Parkway (I-69) and the Bluegrass Parkway, which have taken most long-distance and freight traffic off the old US 62 route. After passing through Georgetown and Cynthiana it leaves Kentucky in Maysville over the Simon Kenton Memorial Bridge.

US 62 is the only US Highway to cross the Ohio River twice. (Note: I-275 around Cincinnati is the only other numbered highway to do so.)) It crosses the Ohio River between Illinois and Kentucky, connecting the far western region of Kentucky with the southern tip of Illinois. Its other crossing over the Ohio River connects the northeastern Kentucky city of Maysville and the southwestern Ohio village of Aberdeen.

=== Ohio ===
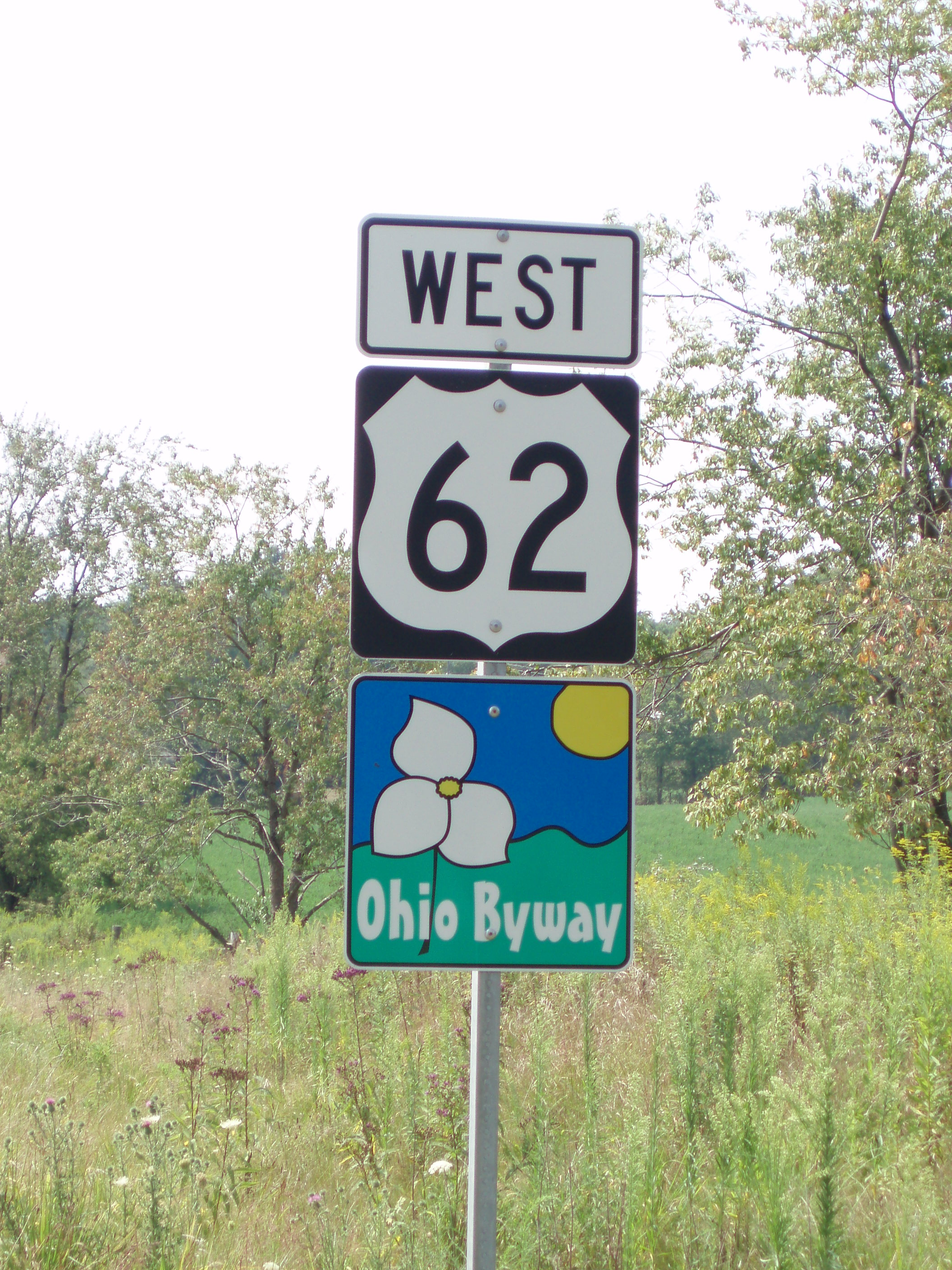
A US 62 marker in Killbuck, Ohio, in Amish Country, also marked as an Ohio Byway

US 62 enters Ohio from Kentucky, crossing the Ohio River at Aberdeen. After the river crossing, the highway follows US 52 until Ripley and US 68 until just east of Georgetown. From there, US 62 enters the towns of Russellville, Hillsboro, and Washington Court House. In Washington Court House, US 62 meets up with State Route 3 (SR 3) and continues all the way into Columbus, passing through the towns of Mount Sterling, Orient, Harrisburg, and Grove City. After heading toward downtown Columbus, US 62 diverts from SR 3 onto US 40 (Broad Street) for a few blocks to Nelson Road.

US 62 runs concurrently with I-670 near John Glenn Columbus International Airport until the eastern side of I-270 where US 62 heads toward Gahanna, New Albany, Johnstown, Utica, Millersburg, and Navarre. About 2.6 miles (4.2 km) north of Navarre, US 62 joins up with US 30 into Canton, where US 62 heads north along I-77. The highway passes West Lawn Cemetery and the President William McKinley memorial and tomb in Canton. At exit 107B on I-77, US 62 heads northeast to Alliance, and Youngstown. It leaves Ohio near Hubbard and enters Pennsylvania near the interchange for I-80.

=== Pennsylvania ===
US 62 enters Pennsylvania from Ohio in Sharon. Also, at the Ohio–Pennsylvania state line, signage for US 62 changes from an east–west to north–south. US 62 also runs north-northeast from the Ohio border towards New York. US 62 passes through Mercer and runs across country to Franklin.

At this point US 62 enters the Allegheny River valley and follows this river for 45 miles (72 km). US 62 crosses the river at Oil City, at Tionesta, and twice again in the Warren area, once near Buckaloons Recreational Area in the Allegheny Islands Wilderness region, where it is concurrent with US 6 for a short distance.

=== New York ===
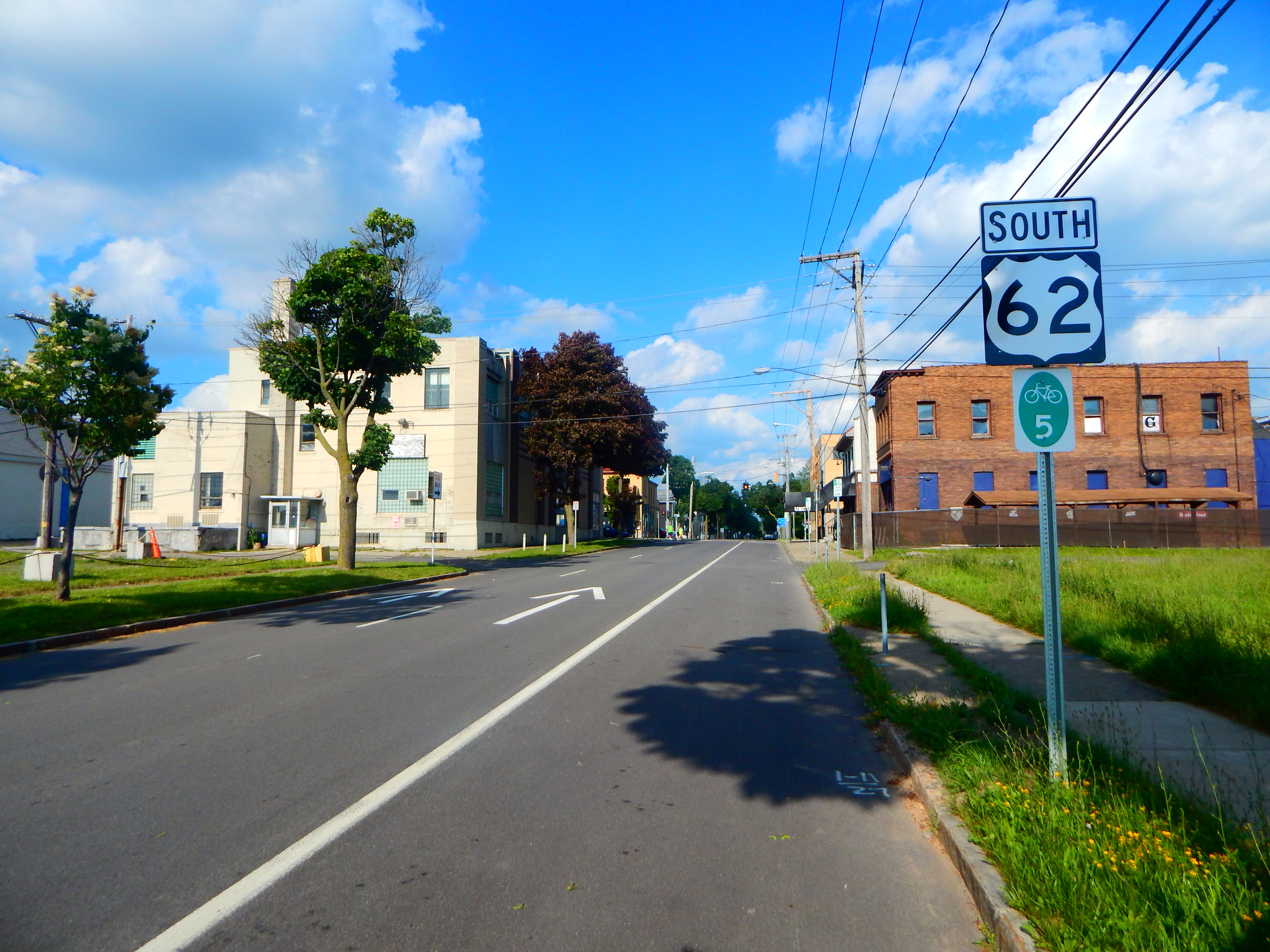
US 62 in Niagara Falls, just after the terminus at NY 104

While most of the route is an east–west route, US 62 takes a north–south directionality in Pennsylvania and New York. It is signed north–south in northern Pennsylvania and New York.

US 62 enters New York State from Pennsylvania in Chautauqua County, south of Frewsburg, past which it intersects with I-86 (Southern Tier Expressway). Following a northeasterly course, US 62 enters Cattaraugus County, crosses Cattaraugus Creek to enter Erie County and passes through the village of Gowanda, taking a more northerly direction. At the village of Hamburg, US 62 turns northeast, passing Buffalo Raceway and the Erie County Fair, New York State Thruway (I-90), continues northward through Lackawanna as South Park Avenue and passes through Buffalo as South Park Avenue and Bailey Avenue. The Bailey Avenue section from New York State Route 5 (NY 5) at the Buffalo city line to NY 324 is maintained by Erie County as County Road 152.

US 62 briefly overlaps NY 324 (Sheridan Drive) in the town of Amherst, and turns northward as Niagara Falls Boulevard, intersects I-290, then exits Erie County and enters Niagara County, as US 62 crosses the Erie Canal / Tonawanda Creek and travels into the town of Wheatfield. The highway intersects NY 425 and turns to the northwest intersecting NY 265 and I-190. On the east side of Niagara Falls the route diverges into US 62 and its parallel route, Business US 62, (formerly NY 62A).

Within the city of Niagara Falls, US 62 runs "backwards", bearing west for several miles as Ferry Avenue southbound (eastbound) and Walnut Avenue northbound (westbound) and terminates on Main Street, while is still signed north–south. The northern (eastern) terminus for both US 62 and Business US 62 is at NY 104 (Main Street), less than 2,000 feet (610 m) from the Rainbow Bridge and U.S. Customs. The Rainbow Bridge then crosses the Niagara River into Canada, offering side-views of the famous Niagara Falls.

In 2009, Legislation was proposed in the NY State Legislature for a bill (S.6277-A/A.9939-A) designating all of US Route 62 in New York State as the "National Veterans Highway". The measure was sponsored by then Senator William Stachowski, and Assemblyperson Francine Delmonte as proposed by the Sons of the American Legion Post 880 as a way to salute and commemorate the service and sacrifice of all veterans of the US. The Bill was signed into law by Governor David Paterson in July 2010. The designation runs from the Pennsylvania State Line south of Frewsburg, NY to a northern terminus near the Rainbow Bridge in Niagara Falls, NY. Designations have also been successful in Illinois and Kentucky to this point.

== Future ==
In Ohio, there are plans to reroute US 62 onto a divided highway from Alliance to Salem, part of a larger relocation of both US 62 and SR 14, then from downtown Youngstown to I-80 as part of the "Hubbard Arterial". Parts of the highway have long been completed to the north of Alliance and Salem; the portion northwest of Alliance is known in documents as US 62T, while the portion north of Salem not already carrying US 62 is known as SR 14T; neither carries a posted route, instead only carrying trailblazer markers indicating routes intersected at the termini.

== Major intersections ==
Texas
Benito Juárez Street and US 85 at the Mexican border in El Paso. US 62/US 85 travels concurrently through the city.
I-110 in El Paso
US 54 in El Paso
I-10 / US 180 in El Paso. US 62/US 180 travel concurrently to Seminole, with an approximate 106-mile-long (171 km) concurrency through New Mexico in-between.
New Mexico
US 285 in Carlsbad. The highways have a 2.0 miles (3.2 km) concurrency north.
Texas
US 180 / US 385 in Seminole. US 62/US 385 travel concurrently to Brownfield.
US 82 / US 380 in Brownfield. US 62/US 82 travels concurrently to Lubbock. US 62/US 380 travels concurrently through the city.
US 84 in Lubbock
I-27 / US 87 in Lubbock
US 82 in Lubbock. The highways travel concurrently to southwest of Ralls.
US 70 in Floydada. The highways travel concurrently to Paducah.
US 70 / US 83 in Paducah. US 62/US 83 travels concurrently to south-southeast of Wellington.
US 287 in Childress
Oklahoma
US 283 in Altus
US 183 in Snyder
I-44 / US 277 / US 281 in Lawton. I-44/US 62 travels concurrently to east of Medicine Park. US 62/US 277 travels concurrently to north of Fort Sill. US 62/US 281 travels concurrently to Anadarko.
US 81 in Chickasha. The highways travel concurrently through the city.
US 81 / US 277 in Chickasha. US 62/US 277 travels concurrently to Newcastle.
I-44 in Chickasha
I-44 / US 277 in Newcastle. I-44/US 62 travels concurrently to Oklahoma City.
I-44 / I-240 in Oklahoma City. I-240/US 62 travels concurrently through the city.
I-35 / I-240 / US 77 in Oklahoma City. I-35/US 62/US 77 travels concurrently through the city.
I-40 / I-235 / US 77 / US 270 in Oklahoma City. I-40/US 62/US 270 travels concurrently through the city.
US 177 in Jacktown
US 377 in Prague
I-40 in Okemah. The highways travel concurrently to Henryetta.
US 75 northeast of Clearview. The highways travel concurrently to Okmulgee.
US 266 in Henryetta
US 64 north-northeast of Boynton. The highways travel concurrently to Muskogee.
US 64 / US 69 in Muskogee. US 62/US 69 travel concurrently through the city.
US 59 in Westville
Arkansas
I-49 / US 71 in Fayetteville. The highways travel concurrently to Bentonville.
US 412 in Springdale
US 412 in Alpena. The highways travel concurrently to Imboden.
US 65 in Bear Creek Springs. The highways travel concurrently to Bellefonte.
US 167 in Ash Flat
US 63 in Hardy. The highways travel concurrently to Imboden.
Future I-57 / US 67 in Pocahontas. The highways travel concurrently to Corning.
US 49 in Piggott
Missouri
US 61 southwest of Howardville. The highways travel concurrently to Sikeston.
I-55 in New Madrid. US 61-62 are also known as I-55 BL, I-55 exit 44.
I-55 north of New Madrid, I-55 exit 49.
US 60 in Sikeston
I-55 in Miner, I-55 exit 67.
Route 107 / I-57 BL in Charleston. BL I-57 forms a concurrency for 1.7 miles (2.7 km) to I-57 on the east side of Charleston.
I-57 / US 60 in Charleston. US 60-62 travels concurrently to Wickliffe, Kentucky, with a short Illinois segment in-between.
Illinois
US 51 in Cairo. The highways travel concurrently to Bardwell.
Kentucky
I-24 in Paducah
US 45 in Paducah. The highways travel concurrently through the city.
US 45 / US 60 in Paducah. The highways travel concurrently to Riverview.
I-24 / I-69 in Calvert City
US 641 in Kentucky Dam Village State Resort Park. The highways travel concurrently to Eddyville.
I-24 / I-69 in Kuttawa
I-69 in Eddyville
US 41 in Nortonville
US 431 in Central City
US 231 in Beaver Dam. The highways travel concurrently through the city.
US 31W in Elizabethtown
I-65 in Elizabethtown
US 31E in Bardstown. The highways travel concurrently through the city.
US 31E / US 150 in Bardstown. US 62/US 150 travels concurrently through the city.
US 127 in Lawrenceburg
US 60 in Versailles. The highways travel concurrently through the city.
US 421 in Midway. The highways travel concurrently to northwest of Lexington.
I-64 northwest of Lexington
US 25 in Georgetown
US 460 in Georgetown
I-75 in Georgetown
US 27 southwest of Cynthiana. The highways travel concurrently through the city.
Ohio
US 52 in Aberdeen. The highways travel concurrently to Ripley.
US 68 in Aberdeen. The highways travel concurrently to Redoak.
US 50 in Hillsboro
US 35 in Washington Court House
US 22 in Washington Court House. The highways travel concurrently for 0.7 miles (1.1 km) through the city.
I-71 northeast of Harrisburg, I-71 exit 94.
SR 665 northeast of Harrisburg
I-270 in Grove City, I-270 exit 2.
I-70 in Columbus, I-70 exit 98A from westbound, no eastbound exit onto US 62/SR 3 and no entrance directly onto I-70 from US 62/SR 3.
US 23 / US 33 in Columbus. The highways travel concurrently for 0.4 miles (0.64 km).
US 40 in Columbus. US 40 travels concurrently with US 62 and SR 3 for 0.3 miles (0.48 km) before SR 3 heads toward Cleveland. US 40 continues 2.1 miles (3.4 km) before heading toward Reynoldsburg
I-71 in Columbus, I-71 exit 108B.
I-670 in Columbus, I-670 exit 7. The highways travel concurrently to west of Gahanna.
I-270 in Gahanna
US 36 in Millwood
US 250 in Wilmot. The highways travel concurrently through the village for 0.07 miles (0.11 km)
US 30 in Massillion. The highways travel concurrently to Canton.
I-77 in Canton. I-77/US 62 travels concurrently through the city to exit 107B.
US 224 in Canfield
I-680 in Youngstown
US 422 in Youngstown
I-80 north of Hubbard; I-80 exit 234
Pennsylvania
US 19 in Mercer. The highways travel concurrently to north of Mercer.
I-79 southwest of Jackson Center
US 322 in Franklin. The highways travel concurrently through the city.
US 6 east-southeast of Youngsville. The highways travel concurrently to Warren.
New York
NY 60 in Frewsburg
I-86 / NY 17 / Southern Tier Expressway in Kennedy
NY 39 in Gowanda
US 20 near Hamburg
I-90 Toll / New York Thruway / NY 179 near Blasdell
I-190 / NY 354 in Buffalo
NY 33 in Buffalo
NY 5 near Amherst
I-290 in Amherst
I-190 in Niagara Falls
NY 104 in Niagara Falls

== Special routes ==
US 62 has special and suffixed routes in several states.

== Notes ==
Browse numbered routes
← US 61	MO	→ US 63
