= Tony Benford =

American basketball player-coach

- Benford in 2026

Current position
- Title: Assistant coach
- Team: TCU
- Conference: Big 12

Biographical details
- Born: March 22, 1964 (age 62); Hobbs, New Mexico, U.S.
- Education: Texas Tech University

Playing career
- 1982–1986: Texas Tech

Coaching career (HC unless noted)
- 1992–1998: New Mexico (assistant)
- 1998–2004: Arizona State (assistant)
- 2004–2006: Arizona State (assoc. HC)
- 2006–2008: Nebraska (assistant)
- 2008–2011: Marquette (assistant)
- 2011–2012: Marquette (assoc. HC)
- 2012–2017: North Texas
- 2017–2019: LSU (assistant/assoc. HC)
- 2019: LSU (interim HC)
- 2019–present: TCU (assistant)

Head coaching record
- Overall: 65–97
- Tournaments: 2–1

Accomplishments and honors

Championships
- SEC regular season (2019)

Tony L. Benford (born March 22, 1964) is an American basketball coach who is an assistant coach of the TCU Horned Frogs men's basketball team.

== Biography ==
A native of Hobbs, New Mexico — and 1982 graduate of Hobbs High School — Benford played under coach Ralph Tasker. Benford is married with four children. He attended Texas Tech University, where he played on the Red Raiders basketball team for head coach Gerald Myers. While Benford played for Texas Tech, the 1984–85 Red Raiders team won both the Southwest Conference (SWC) regular season title and SWC Classic. The 1985–86 Red Raiders team won the SWC Classic, and Benford was named "Most Outstanding Player" in the conference tournament. Benford was drafted by the Boston Celtics in the fourth round of the 1986 NBA draft before playing in the Dutch Basketball League.

== Coaching career ==
=== Head coaching career ===
North Texas
On April 24, 2012, Benford was named men's basketball head coach of the North Texas Mean Green. During his tenure at North Texas, he coached the team to a 62–95 overall record and 30–60 conference record. He was relieved of those duties March 5, 2017.

LSU
On March 8, 2019, Benford was named interim head coach of the LSU Tigers following the suspension of head coach Will Wade. He coached LSU for the last regular season game of the 2018–19 season, 2019 SEC men's basketball tournament and 2019 NCAA Division I men's basketball tournament. As interim head coach, Benford coached LSU to an overall 3–2 record. He went 1–0 in the regular season, 0–1 in the SEC Tournament and 2–1 in the NCAA Division I Tournament earning a berth in the Sweet Sixteen. On April 14, 2019, Will Wade was re-instated as head coach of LSU.

=== Assistant coaching career ===
Benford's first coaching experience was as an assistant with the New Mexico Lobos. Later he served as an assistant with the Arizona State Sun Devils and the Nebraska Cornhuskers before joining the Marquette Golden Eagles men's basketball team in 2008 as an assistant coach under Buzz Williams. Benford was promoted to associate head coach at Marquette for the 2011–12 season.

In 2017, Benford became an assistant coach under Will Wade at LSU for the 2017–18 season. Benford was named interim head coach at LSU towards the end of the 2018–19 season. On April 14, 2019, he returned to his duties as assistant coach at LSU under Will Wade. On April 24, 2019, Benford accepted an assistant coaching position at TCU.

== Head coaching record ==
Record table
Season	Team	Overall	Conference	Standing	Postseason
North Texas Mean Green (Sun Belt Conference) (2012–2013)
2012–13	North Texas	12–20	7–13	4th	
North Texas Mean Green (Conference USA) (2013–2017)
2013–14	North Texas	16–16	6–10	11th	
2014–15	North Texas	14–17	8–10	T–7th	
2015–16	North Texas	12–20	7–11	T–9th	
2016–17	North Texas	8–22	2–16	14th	
North Texas:		62–95 (.395)	30–60 (.333)		
LSU Tigers (Southeastern Conference) (2019)
2018–19	LSU	3–2*	1–0*	1st	NCAA Division I Sweet 16*
LSU:		3–2 (.600)	1–0 (1.000)		
Total:		65–97 (.401)			
National champion Postseason invitational champion Conference regular season champion Conference regular season and conference tournament champion Division regular season champion Division regular season and conference tournament champion Conference tournament champion

*Benford served as interim head coach of LSU for the final five games of the 2018–19 season after Will Wade was suspended.
