= Cairo Mississippi River Bridge =

Bridge

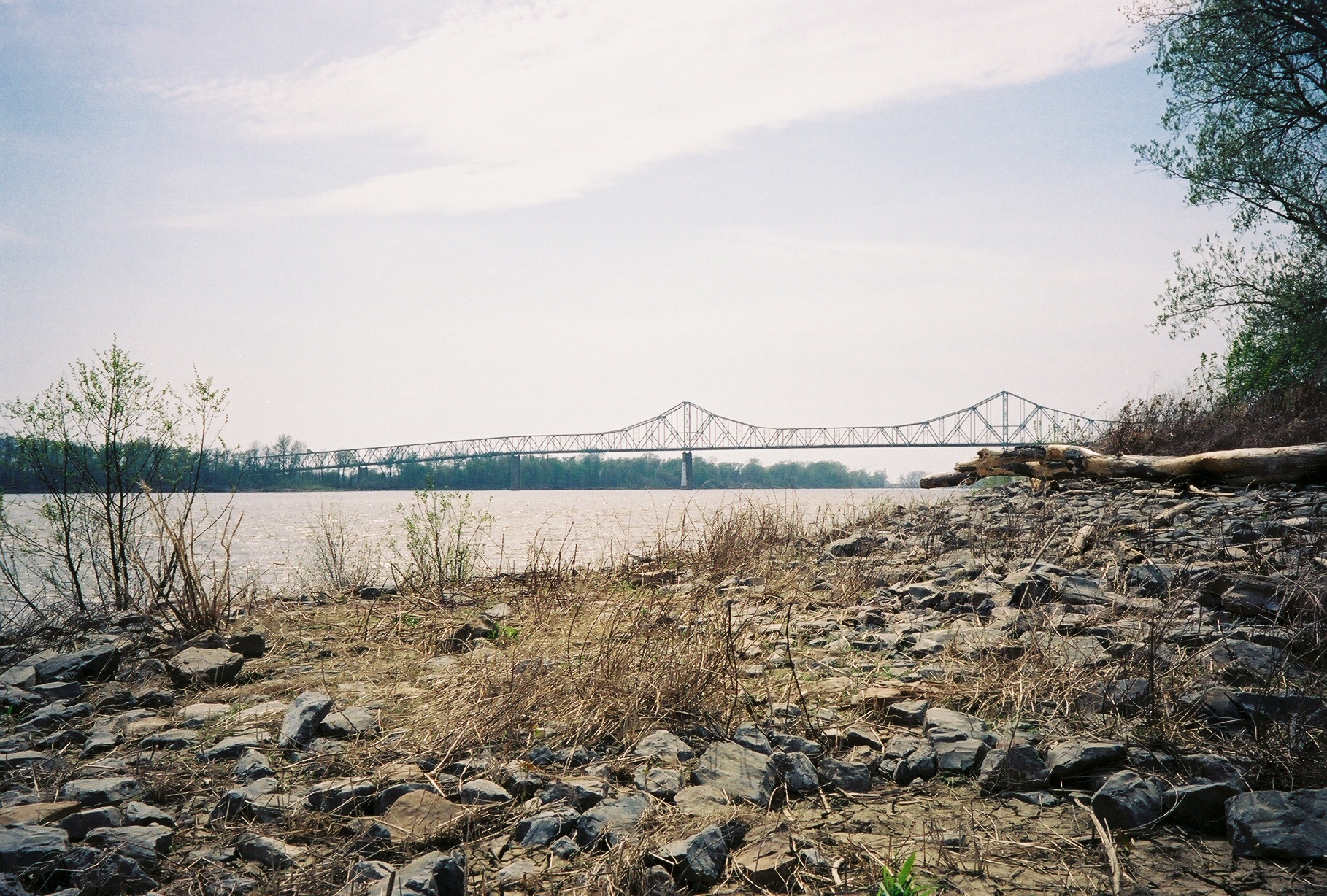
- Coordinates: 36°58′43″N 89°08′52″W
- Carries: 2 lanes of US 60 / US 62
- Crosses: Mississippi River
- Locale: Bird's Point, Missouri and Cairo, Illinois
- Maintained by: Illinois Department of Transportation

Characteristics
- Design: Cantilever bridge
- Total length: 5,175 feet (1,577 m)
- Width: 20 feet (6.1 m)
- Longest span: 701 feet (214 m)
- Clearance below: 114 feet (35 m)

History
- Opened: 1929

Location
- Interactive map of Cairo Mississippi River Bridge

The Cairo Mississippi River Bridge is a steel truss through deck bridge carrying U.S. Route 60 and U.S. Route 62 across the Mississippi River. Located in the tri-state area of Illinois, Kentucky, and Missouri, it connects Cairo, Illinois at its northern terminus to Bird's Point, Missouri at its southern terminus. The bridge measures 5,175.5 feet (1,577.5 meters) in length with a main span of 700.9 feet (213.6 meters) and a width of 20 feet (6.1 meters). At its apex, the bridge stands 114 feet (35 meters) above the river with a 675-foot (206-meter) navigation channel. In the years since the construction of the bridge, the town of Cairo has experienced an 81% population decline (1930 to 2010), the most dramatic decrease of any principal city in the United States. The bridges initially played a part in the town's demise as the ferry and railroad industries were severely impacted.

== History ==
At the start of the Civil War in 1861, this area was the southern extreme of American land in which slavery was prohibited (other than the disjoint portion of California). On April 15, 1865, the morning after the assassination of Abraham Lincoln, the steamboat Sultana was docked near Fort Defiance where 12,000 Union troops were stationed. Less than two weeks later the steamboat, carrying in excess of 2,000 released Union prisoners of war, exploded near Memphis en route back to Cairo, remaining the deadliest ship disaster in American history. In 1876, famed novelist Mark Twain described this vicinity as a "dismal swamp" in his classic novel The Adventures of Tom Sawyer.

The bridge originated as a toll bridge in 1929, constructed by the American Bridge Company and the Missouri Valley Bridge & Iron Co. Traveling downstream, the Cairo Mississippi River Bridge is the southernmost crossing of the Mississippi River prior to its confluence with the Ohio River and lies just 2000 feet west of the mouth of the Ohio.

Shortly after its completion, a second structure was opened in 1937 connecting Kentucky to Illinois now known as the Cairo Ohio River Bridge, its western terminus only 1000 feet from the Cairo Mississippi River Bridge.

In 1954 the toll was removed.

Legend has it that in 1956, a student pilot from southern Missouri's Malden Air Base was alone in a T-28 Trojan aircraft when he decided to fly under the bridge. He had allegedly been planning this maneuver for some time, scouting it from the air and the ground. The story goes that the pilot flew under the bridge, pulled into a loop, and narrowly missed the bridge when he flew under the structure a second time, skimming the water and damaging the wings and roughly 12 inches of the outer tips of the propellers. He returned to the air base where he allegedly attributed the damage to a "rough running engine," his eventual confession leading to his removal from the flight training program.

In 1978, the Cairo I-57 Bridge was completed less than five miles upstream, bypassing Cairo and contributing to its further decline.

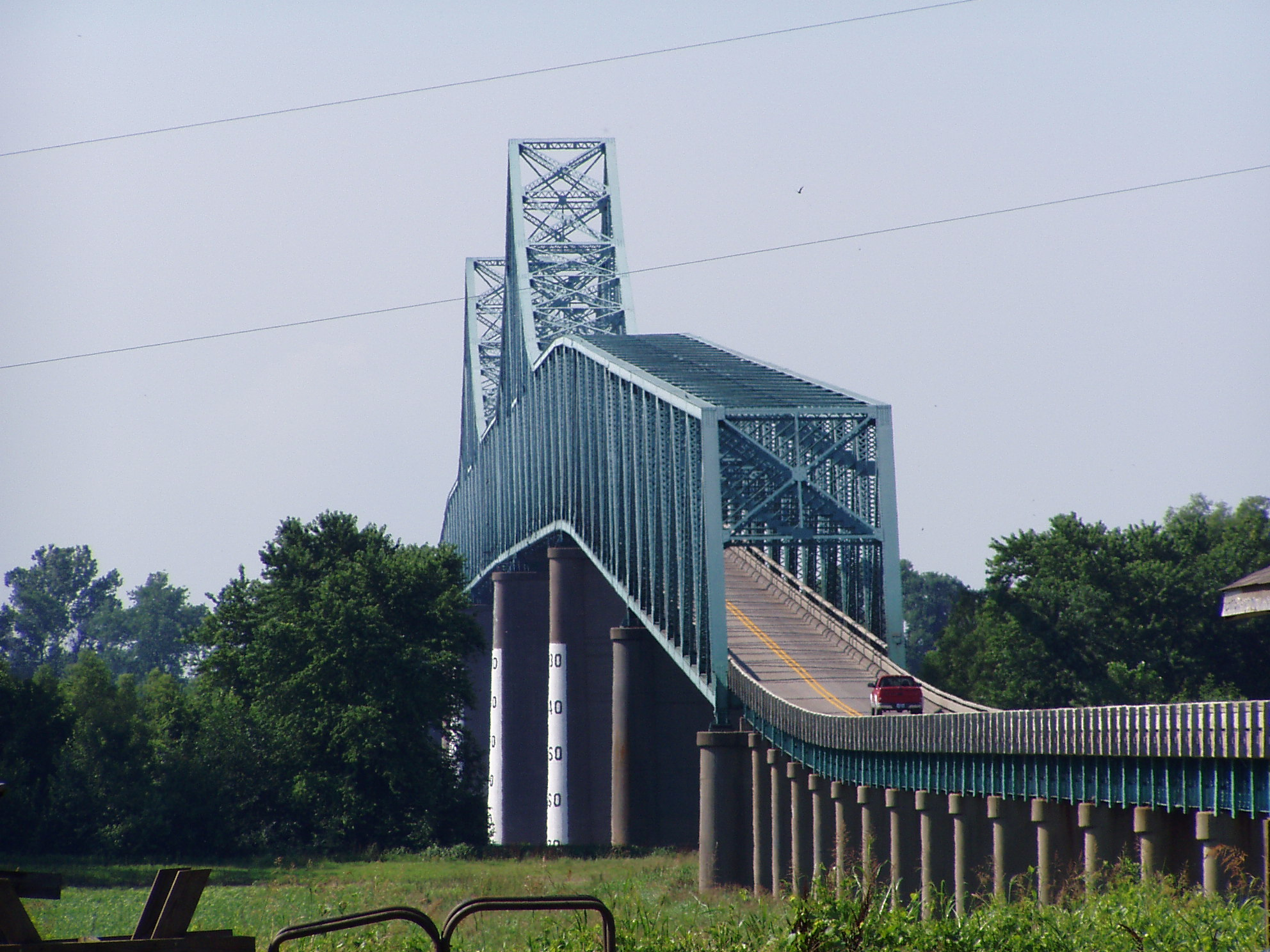
Eastern approach

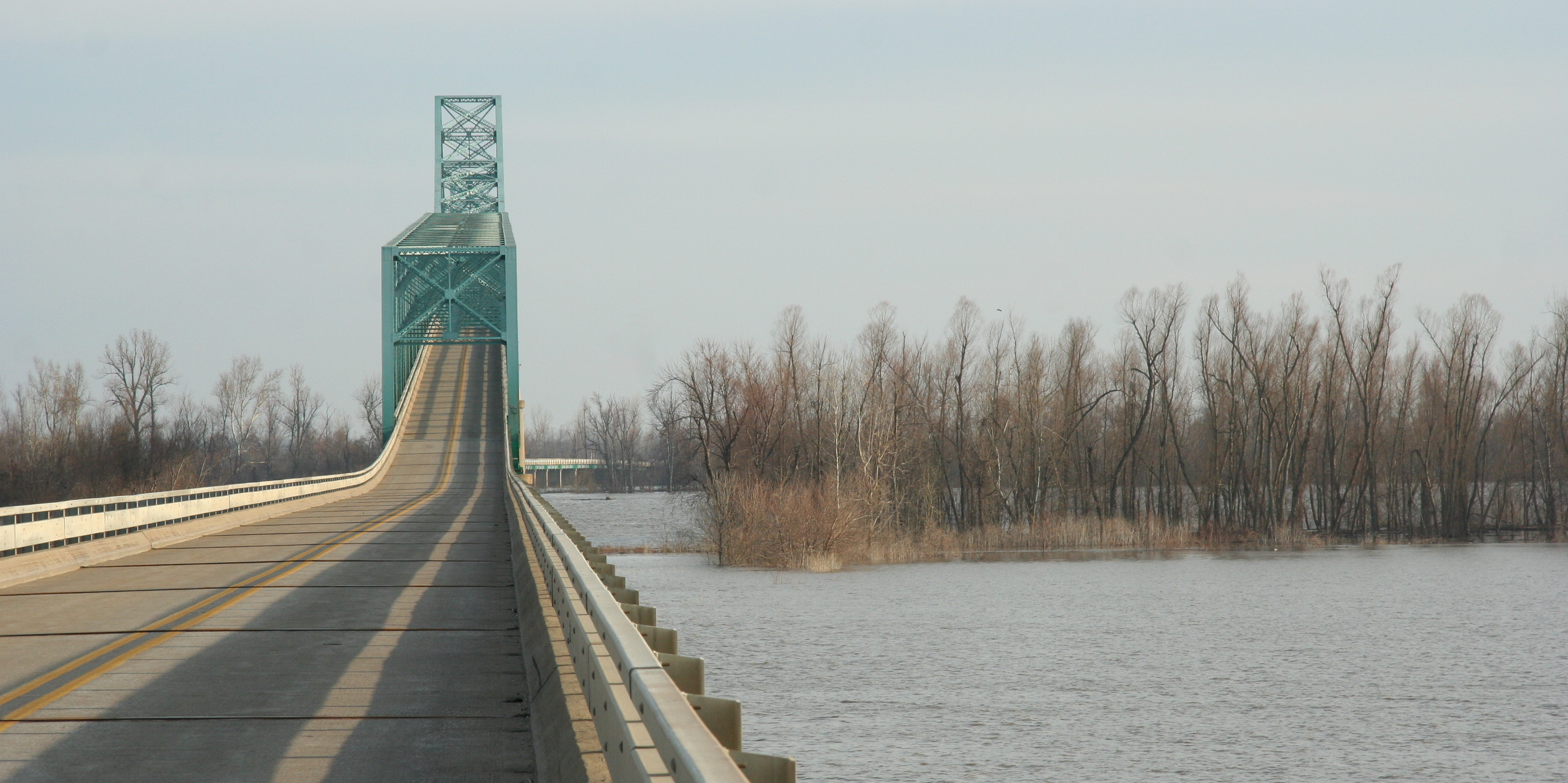
View from the north end

The bridge was completely reconstructed in 1983. Since that time, only one significant incident has taken place on the water below. On May 18, 1996, a towboat moving 21 barges upstream bumped a bridge pier damaging the lead barge but not the bridge itself.

The structure was further rehabilitated in 2005. On November 29, 2010, in an attempt to slow the deterioration of the aging structure, the Illinois Department of Transportation (IDOT) reduced the bridge's weight limit to 15 tons. At that time, roughly 3,500 vehicles traversed the span daily, of which nearly one quarter were tractor-trailers. The signs were largely ignored by truck drivers, accumulating nearly $70,000 of traffic fines in less than three months.

In January 2011, the bridge was finally shut down for the entire year, engineers identifying 25 of 108 deck beams suffering significant rust and degradation. The closure caused a 17-mile (27 km) detour for motorists. Three months later, the area was inundated with water during the 2011 Mississippi River flood. On May 10, the river crested at 47.8 feet in Memphis, topping 46 feet around the Cairo Mississippi River Bridge by May 20. Any depth greater than 43 feet necessitates a closure, but the bridge was already shut down due to the ongoing repairs. The bridge was finally reopened in March 2012.

On February 24, 2015, it was announced that the 86-year-old structure needed $3 million in significant joint and beam repairs and general rehabilitation. It was thus closed on March 16, 2015, by IDOT. It was scheduled to be closed for a period of one year until March 18, 2016, but reopened far ahead of schedule on October 13, 2015.

On October 10, 2019, a weight limit of 33 tons was imposed on the aging structure, effective October 24, 2019.

After an inspection beginning March 13, 2023, found critical issues with "deterioration of the bridge's structural integrity and pier caps", the bridge was closed to all traffic, but reopened in April of the same year.

On September 14, 2023, it was announced the bridge was scheduled to be closed from October 2, 2023, through October 2024 for major structural repairs. Traffic was detoured through Cairo and across the Interstate 57 Bridge. The bridge reopened in September 2024.

== See also ==
- List of crossings of the Upper Mississippi River
