= Hobbs Municipal Schools =

School district in New Mexico, USA

Hobbs Municipal Schools (HMS) is a school district based in Hobbs, New Mexico.

In addition to Hobbs it serves Monument, Nadine, and North Hobbs.

== History ==
Circa 2015 the number of students increased to 10,000, but declined after a decline in the oil market. In October 2017 the number of students was at 10,070.

In early 2019, when the 2018-2019 school year ended, the student count was 10,341. This increased to 10,615 five days after the beginning of the subsequent school year, in fall 2019. In 2020, because schools in New Mexico ended in-person learning because of the COVID-19 pandemic and because Texas schools in general had better academic reputations than New Mexican schools, several New Mexico students moved to Texas. That same year, enrollment figures were down by 1,232.

By 2022 the school district's enrollment was on an upward trajectory.

== Academic performance ==
During the COVID-19 pandemic in New Mexico, in 2020, about 70% of the students at the secondary level failed at least one class due to the pandemic-related difficulties of education.

== Schools ==
High schools

- Hobbs High School
- Hobbs Freshman High School

Middle schools

- Heizer Middle School
- Highland Middle School
  - The 700-person Highland Middle, formerly Highland Junior High School, opened in 1959. The building has no windows.
- Houston Middle School

Elementary schools

- Broadmoor Elementary School
- College Lane Elementary School
- Coronado Elementary School
- Edison Elementary School
- Jefferson Elementary School
- Mills Elementary School
- Murray Elementary School
- Will Rogers Elementary School
- Sanger Elementary School
- Southern Heights Elementary School
- Stone Elementary School
- Taylor Elementary School
- Booker T. Washington Elementary School

Alternative school

- Alternative Learning Center
- CTECH Vocational training center
