= North Hobbs, New Mexico =

- Census-designated place
- Location within New Mexico
- Coordinates: 32°46′23″N 103°07′30″W
- Country: United States
- State: New Mexico
- County: Lea

Area
  - Total: 26.08 sq mi (67.55 km^{2})
  - Land: 26.04 sq mi (67.45 km^{2})
  - Water: 0.039 sq mi (0.10 km^{2})
- Elevation: 3,648 ft (1,112 m)

Population (2020)
  - Total: 6,529
  - Density: 251/sq mi (96.8/km^{2})
- Time zone: UTC-7 (Mountain (MST))
  - Summer (DST): UTC-6 (MDT)
- Area code: 575
- GNIS feature ID: 2630706

North Hobbs is an unincorporated community and census-designated place in Lea County, New Mexico, United States. As of the 2020 census, North Hobbs had a population of 6,529.

== Geography ==
According to the U.S. Census Bureau, the community has an area of 26.062 square miles (67.50 km^{2}); 26.023 square miles (67.40 km^{2}) of its area is land, and 0.039 square miles (0.10 km^{2}) is water.

== Demographics ==
Historical population
Census	Pop.	Note	%±
2010	5,391		—
2020	6,529		21.1%
U.S. Decennial Census

=== 2020 census ===
As of the 2020 census, North Hobbs had a population of 6,529. The median age was 36.2 years. 27.5% of residents were under the age of 18 and 12.7% of residents were 65 years of age or older. For every 100 females there were 106.7 males, and for every 100 females age 18 and over there were 104.8 males age 18 and over.

60.5% of residents lived in urban areas, while 39.5% lived in rural areas.

There were 2,258 households in North Hobbs, of which 38.9% had children under the age of 18 living in them. Of all households, 59.0% were married-couple households, 19.8% were households with a male householder and no spouse or partner present, and 15.4% were households with a female householder and no spouse or partner present. About 20.9% of all households were made up of individuals and 6.7% had someone living alone who was 65 years of age or older.

There were 2,429 housing units, of which 7.0% were vacant. The homeowner vacancy rate was 0.4% and the rental vacancy rate was 11.7%.

Racial composition as of the 2020 census
Race	Number	Percent
White	4,024	61.6%
Black or African American	111	1.7%
American Indian and Alaska Native	79	1.2%
Asian	36	0.6%
Native Hawaiian and Other Pacific Islander	0	0.0%
Some other race	1,319	20.2%
Two or more races	960	14.7%
Hispanic or Latino (of any race)	2,965	45.4%

== Education ==
It is in Hobbs Public Schools. Hobbs High School is the zoned comprehensive high school.
