= New Mexico State Road 322 =

State highway in New Mexico, United States

State Road 322

Route information
- Maintained by NMDOT
- Length: 3.152 mi (5.073 km)

Major junctions
- West end: End of route near Monument
- East end: NM 8 in Monument

Location
- Country: United States
- State: New Mexico
- Counties: Lea

Highway system
- New Mexico State Highway System; Interstate; US; State; Scenic
← NM 321	→ NM 325

State Road 322 (NM 322) is a 3.152-mile-long (5.073 km) state highway in the US state of New Mexico. NM 322's western terminus is at the end of route west-southwest of Monument, and the eastern terminus is at NM 8 in Monument.

== Major intersections ==
The entire route is in Lea County.

Location	mi	km	Destinations	Notes
Monument	0.000	0.000	NM 8	Eastern terminus
	3.152	5.073	End of route	Western terminus
1.000 mi = 1.609 km; 1.000 km = 0.621 mi
