= Nadine, New Mexico =

- Census-designated place
- Location within New Mexico Location within the United States
- Coordinates: 32°37′23″N 103°06′28″W
- Country: United States
- State: New Mexico
- County: Lea

Area
  - Total: 11.40 sq mi (29.52 km^{2})
  - Land: 11.39 sq mi (29.51 km^{2})
  - Water: 0.0039 sq mi (0.01 km^{2})
- Elevation: 3,583 ft (1,092 m)

Population (2020)
  - Total: 477
  - Density: 41.9/sq mi (16.17/km^{2})
- Time zone: UTC-7 (Mountain (MST))
  - Summer (DST): UTC-6 (MDT)
- Area code: 575
- GNIS feature ID: 2584159

Nadine is an unincorporated community and census-designated place in Lea County, New Mexico, United States. As of the 2020 census, Nadine had a population of 477. New Mexico State Road 18 passes through the community.

== Geography ==
According to the U.S. Census Bureau, the community has an area of 11.4 square miles (29.4 km^{2}), of which 0.004 square miles (0.01 km^{2}), or 0.05%, are water.

== Demographics ==
Historical population
Census	Pop.	Note	%±
2010	376		—
2020	477		26.9%
U.S. Decennial Census

== Education ==
It is in Hobbs Public Schools. Hobbs High School is the zoned comprehensive high school.
