= Monument, New Mexico =

- Census-designated place
- Location within New Mexico Location within the United States
- Coordinates: 32°37′27″N 103°16′40″W
- Country: United States
- State: New Mexico
- County: Lea

Area
  - Total: 5.28 sq mi (13.67 km^{2})
  - Land: 5.28 sq mi (13.67 km^{2})
  - Water: 0 sq mi (0.00 km^{2})
- Elevation: 3,596 ft (1,096 m)

Population (2020)
  - Total: 213
  - Density: 40.4/sq mi (15.58/km^{2})
- Time zone: UTC-7 (Mountain (MST))
  - Summer (DST): UTC-6 (MDT)
- ZIP code: 88265
- Area code: 575
- GNIS feature ID: 2629120

Monument is a census-designated place and unincorporated community in Lea County, New Mexico, United States. As of the 2020 census, Monument had a population of 213. Monument has a post office with ZIP code 88265. State routes 8 and 322 intersect in the community. It was the first inhabited community in Lea County and was named after nearby Monument Spring. Jim Cook established the post office and a general store.

== Demographics ==
Historical population
Census	Pop.	Note	%±
2010	206		—
2020	213		3.4%
U.S. Decennial Census

== Education ==
It is in Hobbs Public Schools. Hobbs High School is the zoned comprehensive high school.
