= Rob Evans (basketball) =

American college basketball coach (born 1946)

Biographical details
- Born: September 7, 1946 (age 80); Hobbs, New Mexico, U.S.

Playing career
- 1964–1966: Lubbock Christian
- 1966–1968: New Mexico State
- Position: Guard

Coaching career (HC unless noted)
- 1969–1976: New Mexico State (assistant)
- 1976–1990: Texas Tech (assistant)
- 1990–1992: Oklahoma State (assistant)
- 1992–1998: Ole Miss
- 1998–2006: Arizona State
- 2007–2011: Arkansas (assistant)
- 2011–2012: TCU (assistant)
- 2012–2017: North Texas (associate HC)

Head coaching record
- Overall: 205–201
- Tournaments: 1–3 (NCAA Division I); 1–3 (NIT)

Accomplishments and honors

Championships
- 2 SEC West Division (1997, 1998)

Awards
- SEC Coach of the Year (1997)

Robert Oran Evans (born September 7, 1946) is an American college basketball coach. He was most recently the associate head coach with the University of North Texas. Evans served as head men's basketball coach at the University of Mississippi (Ole Miss) from 1992 to 1998 and Arizona State University from 1998 to 2006. Currently serves as Special Assistant to the Athletic Director at Southern Methodist University from 2017.

== Early years ==
Evans was born in Hobbs, New Mexico, the son of Gladys (née Spirlin), a home cleaner, and Oscar, a preacher and janitor. Robert was the fourth of seven children, all of whom would go on to graduate college.

Evans played high school basketball at Hobbs High School under legendary coach Ralph Tasker. His senior year he was named co-captain. That year the team made it to the 1964 championship game and Evans was invited to the state all-star game in Albuquerque.

Evans played junior college basketball at what is now Lubbock Christian University where he was named the school's first All-American. Both seasons he played at Lubbock Christian Evans was voted the teams’ best defensive player. In his second year with the team Evans was named team captain. In 1966 Evans earned his associate degree in Arts and Sciences. At Lubbock Christian Evans was teammates with Gerald Turner who would later become Chancellor of the University of Mississippi. Turner was instrumental in Evans’ hiring as head basketball coach in 1992.

Evans transferred to New Mexico State University for the 1966–67 season where he was coached by Lou Henson. He was named team captain and led the Aggies to a 15–11 record and an NCAA tournament appearance. The next season Evans again captained the team to a 23–6 record and another NCAA tournament appearance. In 1967 Evans was selected NMSU's most outstanding athlete. In May 1968 Evans earned his bachelor's degree in education.

== Coaching career ==
After his graduation, Evans was hired as an assistant at New Mexico State under Henson. When Henson left for Illinois in 1976, Evans moved to Texas Tech and served for 14 years as an assistant under Gerald Myers. After two years as an assistant at Oklahoma State under Eddie Sutton, Evans was hired at Ole Miss as its first black coach in a major sport.

Evans inherited a program that had been one of the dregs of the Southeastern Conference for decades. The Rebels had not had a winning season in SEC play since 1982–83, and had only finished in the top half of the conference twice in 59 years of conference play. After four years rebuilding the program, the Rebels shocked the SEC by winning consecutive West Division titles in 1997 and 1998 and notching the first 20-win seasons in school history. Ole Miss had been one of the few longstanding members of a "power conference" to have never won 20 games in a season.

In 1998, Evans moved to Arizona State, which was reeling in the wake of a point-shaving scandal. His tenure at Arizona State include four NIT appearances and one NCAA appearance in eight seasons.

== Professional players coached ==
Ole Miss

- Ansu Sesay

Arizona State

- Ike Diogu
- Eddie House
- Tommy Smith
- Awvee Storey

== Head coaching record ==
Record table
Season	Team	Overall	Conference	Standing	Postseason
Ole Miss Rebels (Southeastern Conference) (1992–1998)
1992–93	Ole Miss	10–18	4–12	6th (West)	
1993–94	Ole Miss	14–13	7–9	4th (West)	
1994–95	Ole Miss	8–19	3–13	6th (West)	
1995–96	Ole Miss	12–15	6–10	T–4th (West)	
1996–97	Ole Miss	20–9	11–5	1st (West)	NCAA Division I first round
1997–98	Ole Miss	22–7	12–4	1st (West)	NCAA Division I first round
Ole Miss:		86–81	43–53		
Arizona State Sun Devils (Pacific-10 Conference) (1998–2006)
1998–99	Arizona State	14–16	6–12	9th	
1999–00	Arizona State	19–13	10–8	T–4th	NIT second round
2000–01	Arizona State	13–16	5–13	T–6th	
2001–02	Arizona State	14–15	7–11	7th	NIT first round
2002–03	Arizona State	20–12	11–7	4th	NCAA Division I second round
2003–04	Arizona State	10–17	4–14	10th	
2004–05	Arizona State	18–14	7–11	T–6th	NIT first round
2005–06	Arizona State	11–17	5–13	T–8th	
Arizona State:		119–120	55–89		
Total:		205–201			
National champion Postseason invitational champion Conference regular season champion Conference regular season and conference tournament champion Division regular season champion Division regular season and conference tournament champion Conference tournament champion
