= New Mexico State Road 8 =

State highway in New Mexico, United States

State Road 8
- NM 8 highlighted in red

Route information
- Maintained by NMDOT
- Length: 15.650 mi (25.186 km)

Major junctions
- South end: NM 176 west of Eunice
- North end: US 62 / US 180 west of Hobbs

Location
- Country: United States
- State: New Mexico
- Counties: Lea

Highway system
- New Mexico State Highway System; Interstate; US; State; Scenic
← NM 7	→ NM 9

State Road 8 (NM 8) is a primarily north–south state highway in the state of New Mexico. NM 8's southern terminus is at NM 176 west of Eunice, and the northern terminus is at U.S. Route 62 (US 62)/US 180 west of Hobbs.

== Route description ==
State Road 8 begins at its junction with NM 176 west of Eunice. From there, the highway runs north traveling through largely rural land until reaching its northern terminus with US Routes 62 and 180 west of Hobbs.

== History ==
NM 8 previously extended further south along NM 176, past the Eunice Airport and into Eunice. The route was truncated to its current southern terminus by the state transportation commission on May 25, 2006.

== Major intersections ==
The entire route is in Lea County.

Location	mi	km	Destinations	Notes
	0.000	0.000	NM 176 – Eunice	Southern terminus
Oil Center	2.500	4.023	NM 175 west	Eastern terminus of NM 175
Monument	10.700	17.220	NM 322 west	Eastern terminus of NM 322
	15.650	25.186	US 62 / US 180 – Carlsbad, Hobbs	Northern terminus
1.000 mi = 1.609 km; 1.000 km = 0.621 mi
