= Ralph Tasker =

American basketball coach (1919–1999)

- Born: July 15, 1919; Moundsville, West Virginia, U.S.
- Died: July 19, 1999 (aged 80); Hobbs, New Mexico, U.S.
- Known for: High school basketball coach

Ralph Edwin Tasker (July 15, 1919 – July 19, 1999) was an American basketball coach. He coached for over 50 years, including 49 years at Hobbs High School in Hobbs, New Mexico. He won twelve New Mexico Boys' State Basketball Championships: one with Lovington High School (1949) and eleven with Hobbs (1956, 1957, 1958, 1966, 1968, 1969, 1970, 1980, 1981, 1987, 1988). His other accomplishments include twice being named National High School Coach of the Year, induction into the National High School Sports Hall of Fame, and being chosen for the Naismith Memorial Basketball Hall of Fame Morgan Wootten Award. The Hobbs High School home gymnasium is named Ralph Tasker Arena in his honor.

As head coach at Sulphur Springs (OH), Lovington (NM), and Hobbs, he compiled a win-loss record of 1122-291 (.794). Tasker was known for employing a full-court press for the entire game. Tasker's teams were often high scoring, with his 1969-70 team averaging 114.6 points per game and recording 14 consecutive 100-point games, both national high school records.

== Coaching career ==
=== Sulphur Springs (OH) 1941-42 ===
After attending Alderson-Broaddus College on a basketball scholarship, Tasker became the head basketball coach at the high school in Sulphur Springs, Ohio. His team compiled a 5–11 record competing in the rural Crawford County League. However, he coached there for only one season before leaving to join the military in response to the bombing of Pearl Harbor. He served in the U.S. Army Air Corps for most of the next five years, being stationed in Missouri, Texas, and Kirtland Field (now Kirtland Air Force Base) in Albuquerque, New Mexico.

=== Lovington (NM) 1946-49 ===
After World War II, Tasker became the head basketball coach at Lovington High School in Lovington, New Mexico. Over three seasons in Lovington, he posted a 52–22 win-loss record, culminating in the 1949 New Mexico State Championship (all New Mexico schools competed in a single class at that time). Despite winning the state championship, Tasker was unhappy that Lovington High would not give him his own key to the gym, so he accepted an offer to become the head basketball coach in nearby Hobbs, New Mexico beginning with the 1949–50 season.

=== Hobbs (NM) 1949-98 ===
Tasker's career at Hobbs High School began slowly, with losses in his first three games and mixed results in his first six seasons overall. In the 1955-56 season, however, Tasker began instructing his players to apply full-court press defense for the entire game. At the time, most coaches only resorted to the press after their teams had fallen behind, but the well-conditioned Eagles saw positive results from the frantic, up-tempo style immediately. Led by future All-American and NBA All-Star Bill Bridges (basketball), Hobbs captured the 1956 and 1957 New Mexico State Championships. Then, despite losing all five starters to graduation, Hobbs won the title for a third consecutive season in 1958, proving that Tasker's "run and press" strategy was no fluke.

The 1962–63 and 1963–64 seasons saw Tasker's teams go 27–1 and 26–2 respectively, but both teams suffered 1-point defeats in the state championship game. The 1965–66 Eagles team proved to be one of Tasker's best, however, as they won the state championship and also posted a 26–0 record to give him his first undefeated season. Losing only four games in three seasons, Hobbs again captured state championships in 1968, 1969, and 1970, giving Tasker his second run of three-in-a-row. He was named National High School Coach of the Year in 1969 by the National High School Coaches Association, and the Eagles' home gymnasium was renamed Ralph Tasker Arena in his honor during the 1969–70 season. The 1969–70 Eagles team averaged 114.6 points per game and scored 100 points or more in 14 consecutive games, both national high school records.

After state runner-up finishes in 1971 and 1976, Tasker's Eagles again claimed back-to-back state championships in 1980 and 1981. His 1981 team posted a 26-0 record to give him his second undefeated season. In 1980 he was named National High School Coach of the Year by the National Sports News Service. After winning back-to-back state titles again in 1987 and 1988, Tasker's number of New Mexico State Championships with Hobbs High was set at eleven.

On January 29, 1993 Tasker recorded win number 1,027 to move into first place on the All-Time Wins list among high school basketball coaches. However, Robert Hughes (basketball coach) and Morgan Wootten have since passed him on that list. After retiring following the 1997-98 season, his final win-loss record stands at 1122-291 (.794). In 2009, he was posthumously awarded the Morgan Wootten Lifetime Achievement Award by the Naismith Memorial Basketball Hall of Fame.

== Personal life ==
Tasker was married to Margaret Marple Tasker for 49 years, from October 1941 to January 1991, when she died. They had three children: Nancy, Diane, and Tim. As a teacher at Hobbs High School, he taught Social Studies and Government and was named Teacher of the Year three times. He is buried in Prairie Haven Cemetery in Hobbs, New Mexico.

== Legacy ==
As head basketball coach at Hobbs High School, Ralph Tasker was largely responsible for creating one of the most successful high school basketball programs in the United States. Dozens of former Hobbs players have received NCAA scholarships, and thirteen have been drafted by NBA teams. NCAA coach Rob Evans is a former Hobbs Eagle player under Tasker, and Nolan Richardson credits Tasker with inspiring the "40 Minutes of Hell" defense which he popularized at the University of Arkansas. Russ Gilmore, who succeeded Tasker as head basketball coach at Hobbs High and who has won five New Mexico State Championships of his own, credits Tasker with helping him assume control of the program. Hall of Fame Coach Morgan Wootten has said of Tasker, "Ralph was a true pioneer of the game at the high school level, and his lasting impact of the thousands of lives he touched over his 53 years will never be forgotten."
