= Cairo Ohio River Bridge =

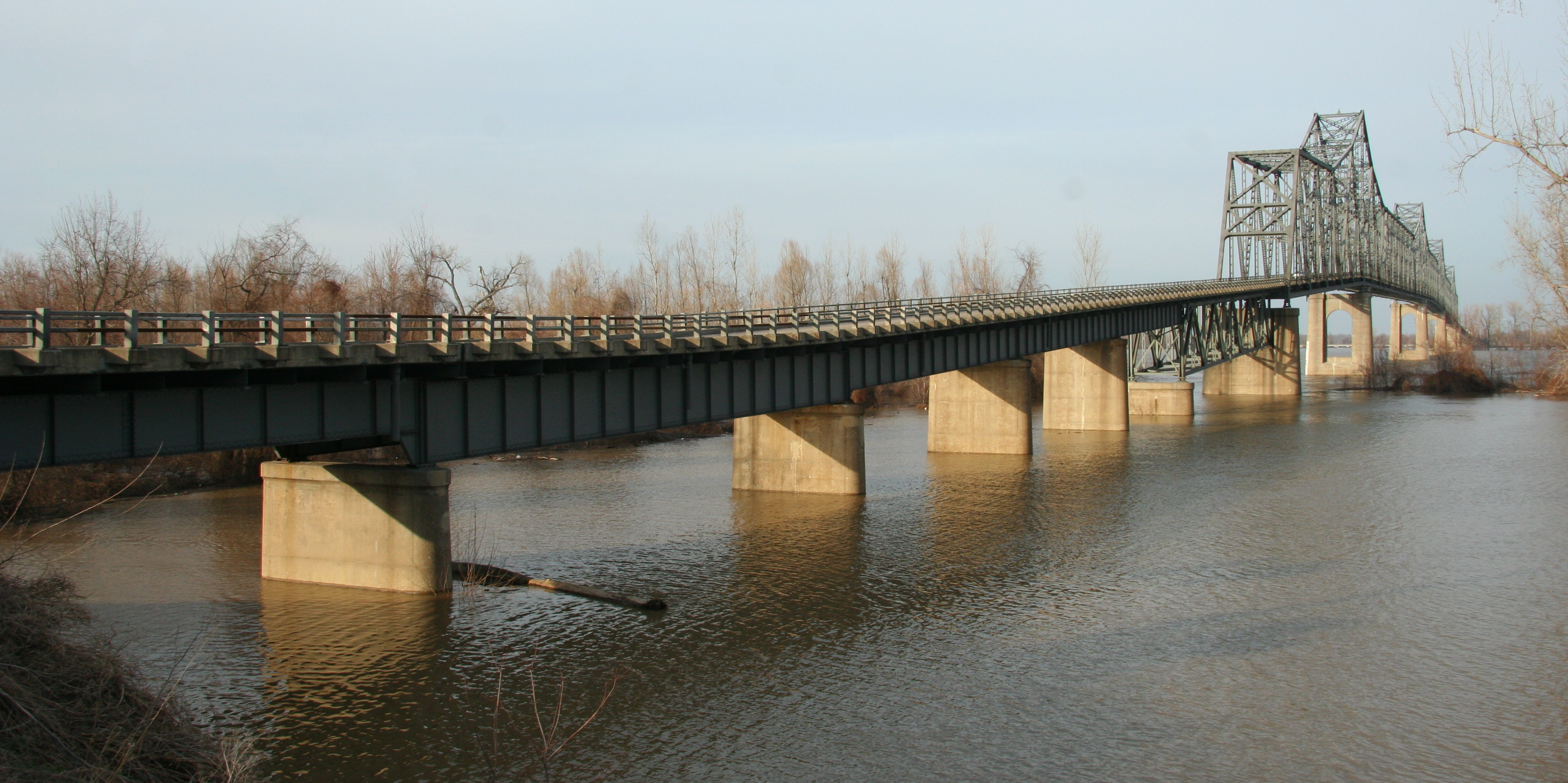
- Coordinates: 36.9935°N 89.1462°W
- Carries: 2 lanes of US 51 / US 60 / US 62
- Crosses: Ohio River
- Locale: Wickliffe, Kentucky and Cairo, Illinois
- Maintained by: Kentucky Transportation Cabinet

Characteristics
- Design: Cantilever bridge
- Total length: 5,863.7 feet (1,787.3 m)
- Width: 20 feet (6.1 m)
- Longest span: 800 feet (240 m)
- Clearance above: 19.6 feet (6.0 m)

History
- Opened: November 11, 1938

Location
- Interactive map of Cairo Ohio River Bridge

The Cairo Ohio River Bridge is a cantilever bridge carrying U.S. Route 51, U.S. Route 60, and U.S. Route 62 across the Ohio River between Wickliffe, Kentucky and Cairo, Illinois. Of all the Ohio River crossings, it is the furthest downstream; the Mississippi River can be seen while crossing the bridge and looking westward.

This is an authorized truck route.

On July 6, 2026, the bridge was closed due to a partial structural failure. It was reopened on July 17, 2026.

== History ==
Construction was awarded to Modjeski and Masters and the Mt. Vernon Bridge Co. It was finished on November 11, 1938.

The bridge's tolls were removed in 1948.

The Cairo Ohio River Bridge was rehabilitated in 1979 and is eligible for listing on the National Register of Historic Places.

Steel framing

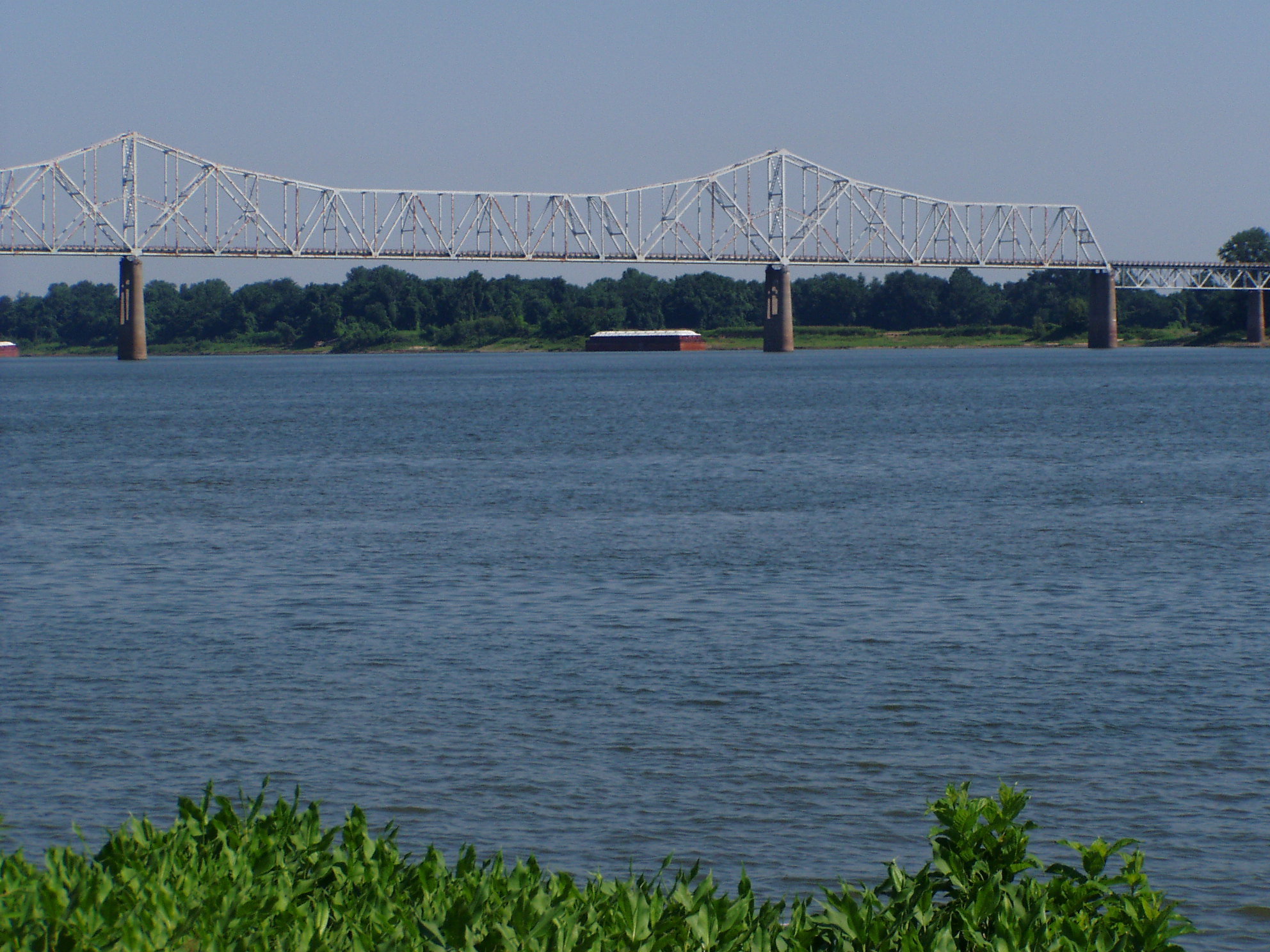
Eastern spans

== See also ==
- List of crossings of the Ohio River
