= Fort Defiance (Illinois) =

Former military fortification in Alexander County, Illinois

Coordinates: 36.9864411°N 89.1459038°W

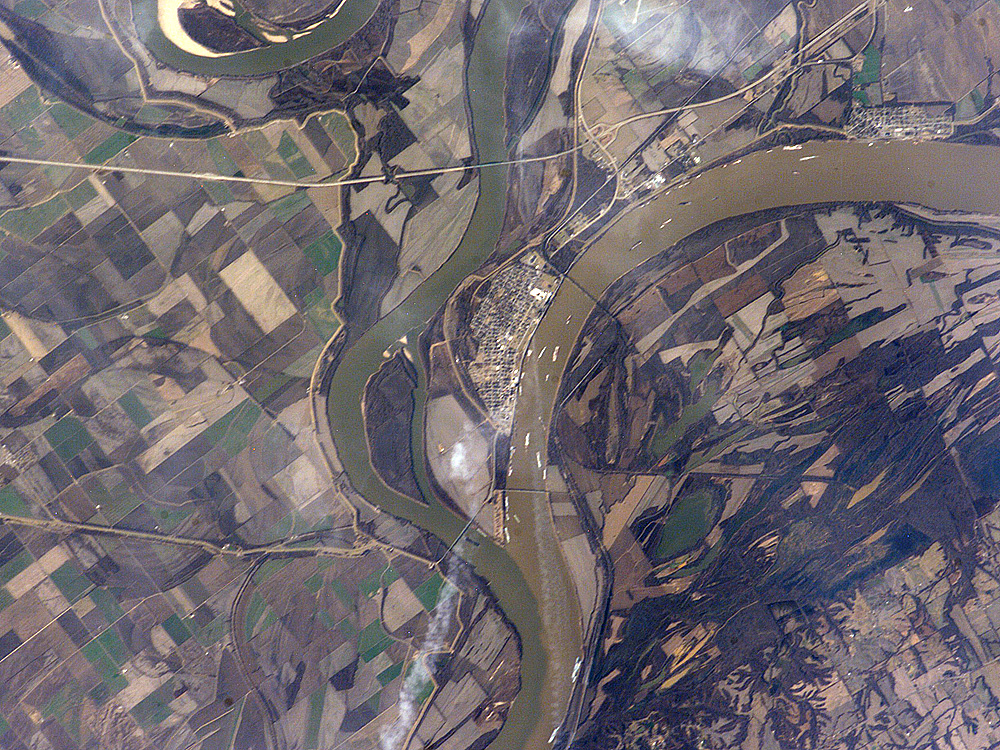
Fort Defiance Park is the brown colored rectangular area at the tip of the peninsula.

Fort Defiance, known as Camp Defiance during the American Civil War, is a former military fortification located at the confluence of the Ohio and Mississippi rivers in the city limits of Cairo, in Alexander County, Illinois. The strategic significance of the site has been known since prehistoric times with archaeological evidence of warfare dating to the Mississippian era. It is the southernmost park in the state of Illinois. At 279 feet (85 m) in elevation, Fort Defiance Point is also Illinois' lowest point.

Formerly a state park, it has been owned and maintained by the city of Cairo since the 1990s. The Illinois Department of Natural Resources assumed control of Fort Defiance on July 31, 2014, with the goal of returning it to state park status. The park is a satellite of Horseshoe Lake State Fish and Wildlife Area.

== History ==
On his trek up the Mississippi, Frenchman Pierre Laclède was among the first Europeans to land on the southern tip of what is now Illinois.

== Gallery ==
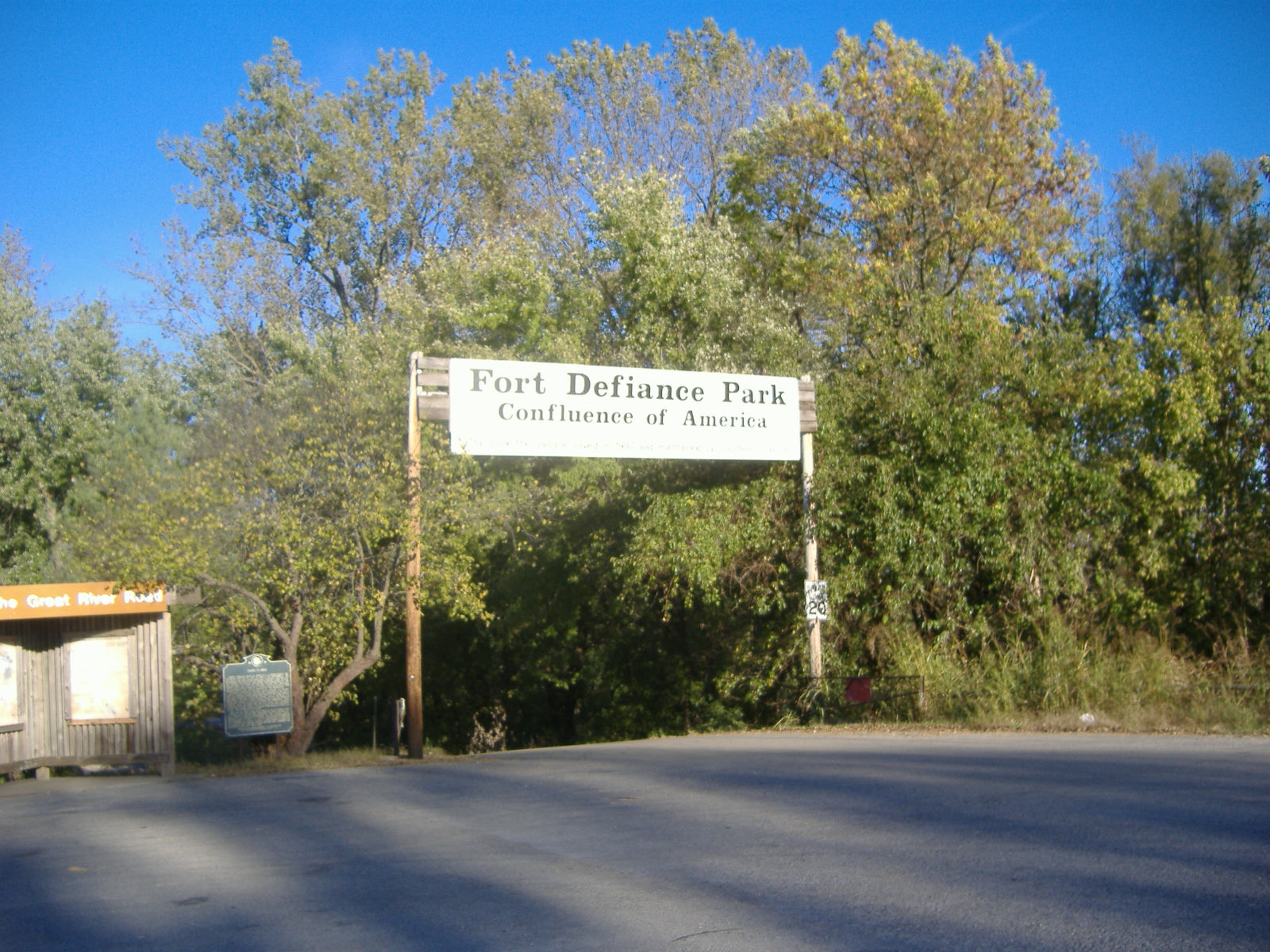
Entrance

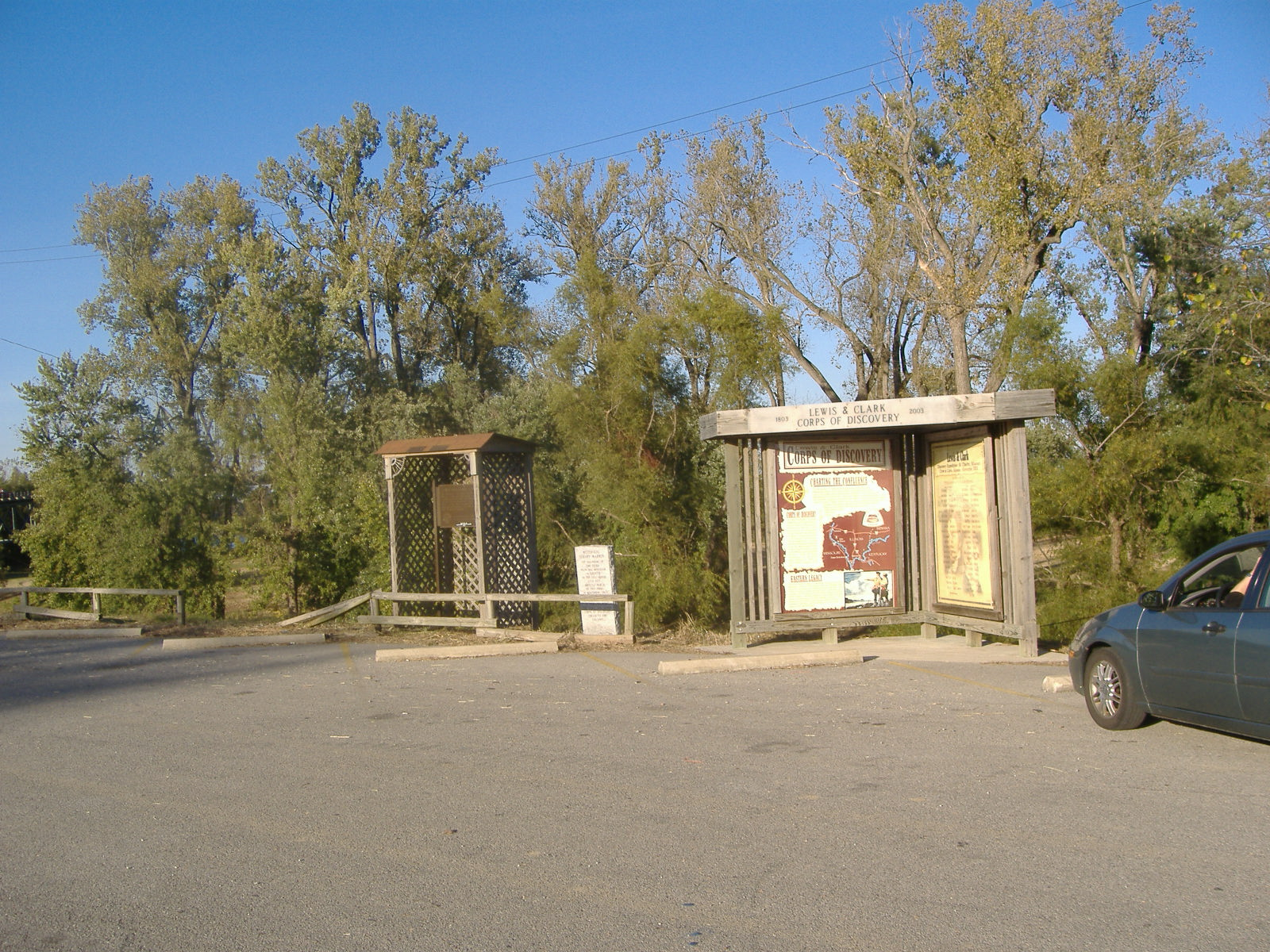
Roadside of the Park

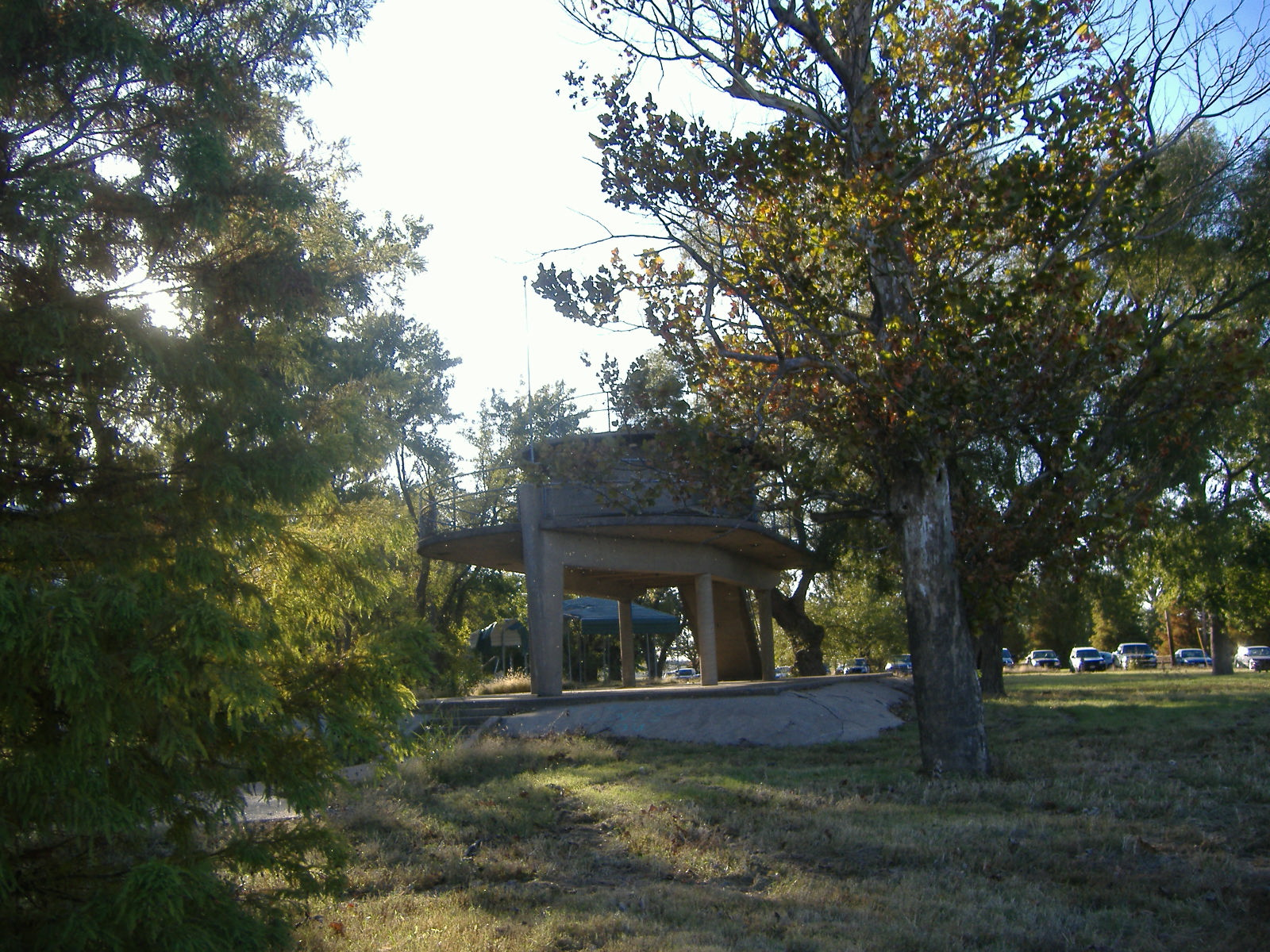
Tower at the park

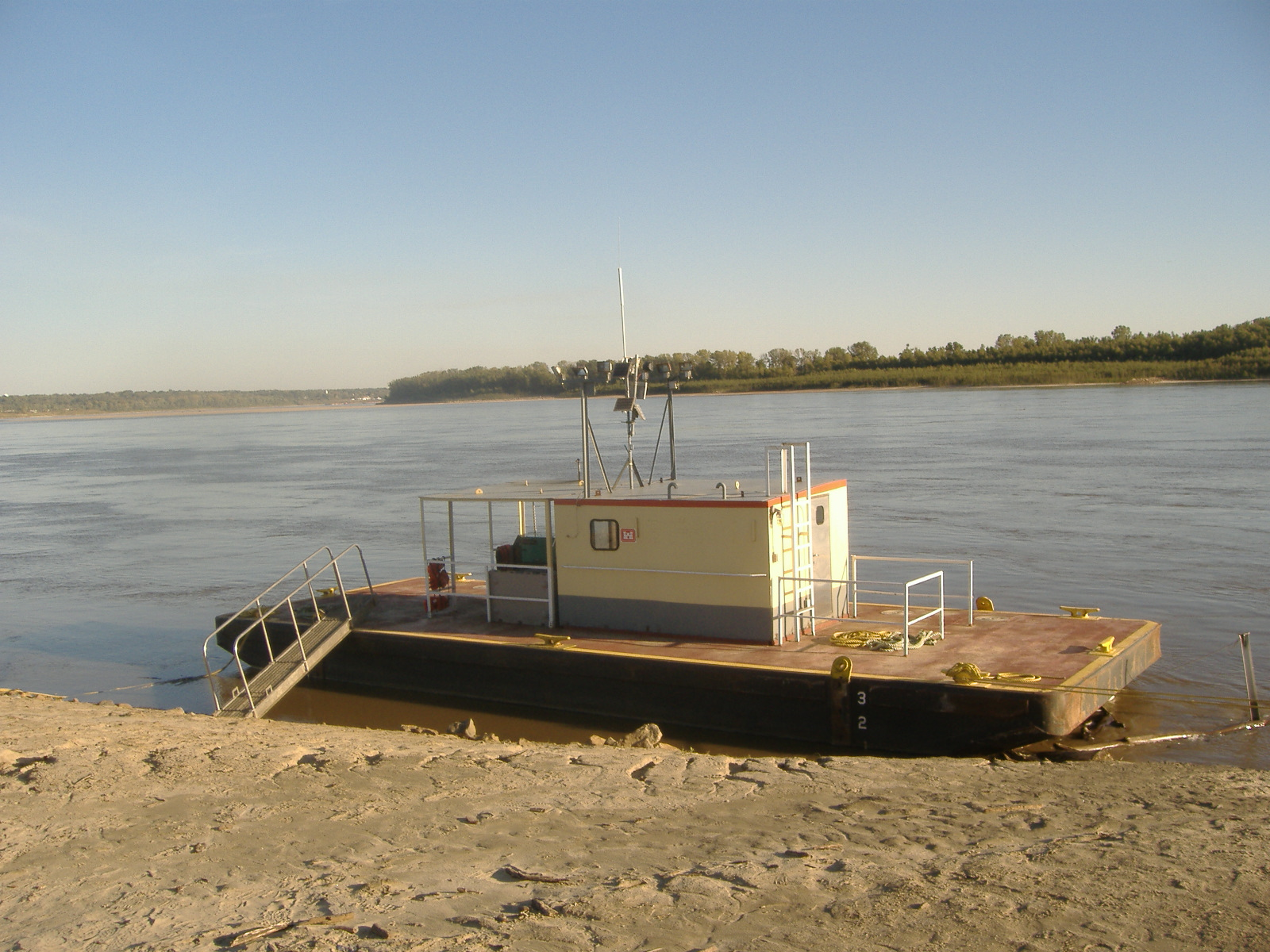
Lifestation on riverside

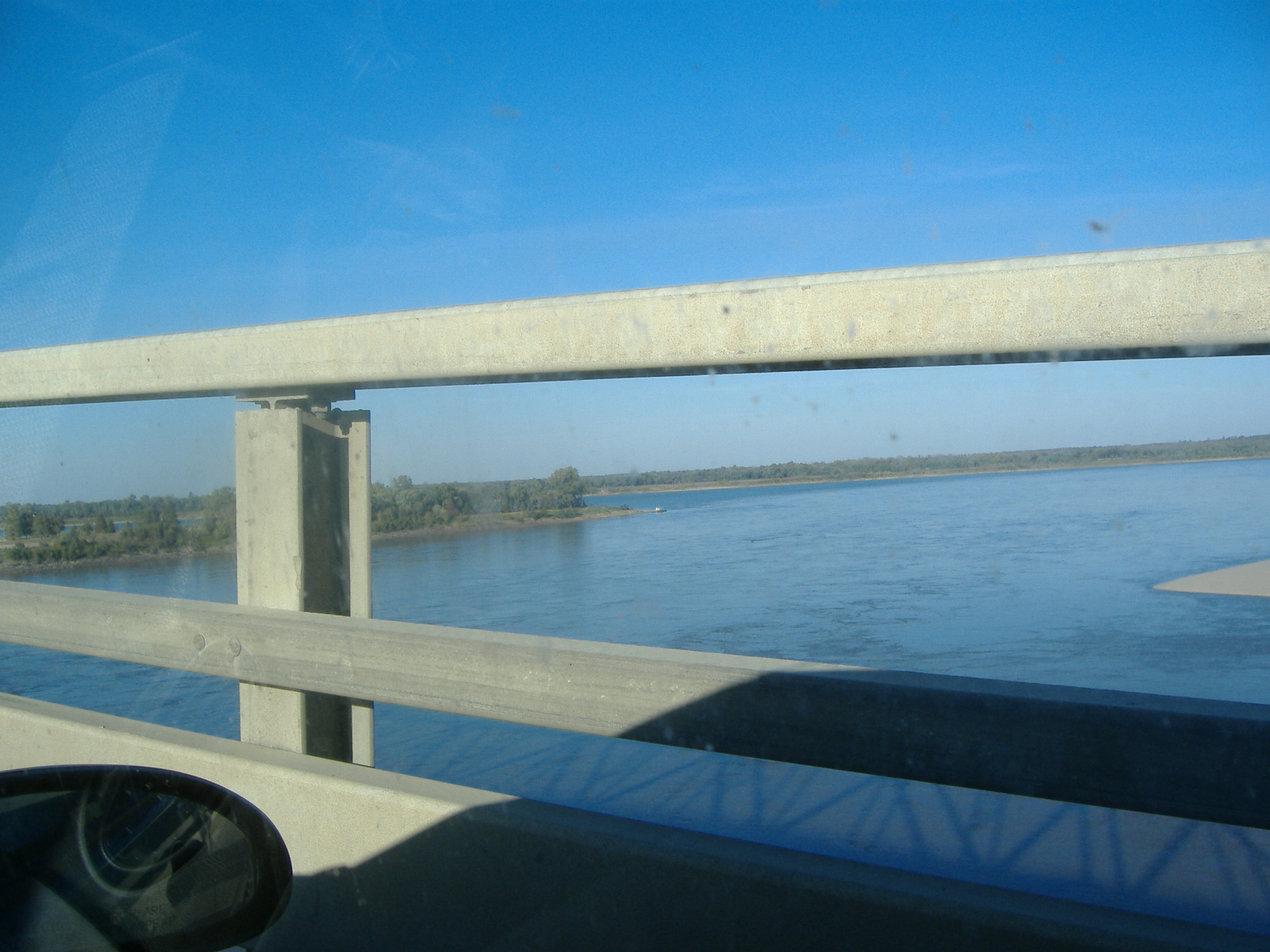
Overlooking Fort Defiance from the Cairo Mississippi River bridge

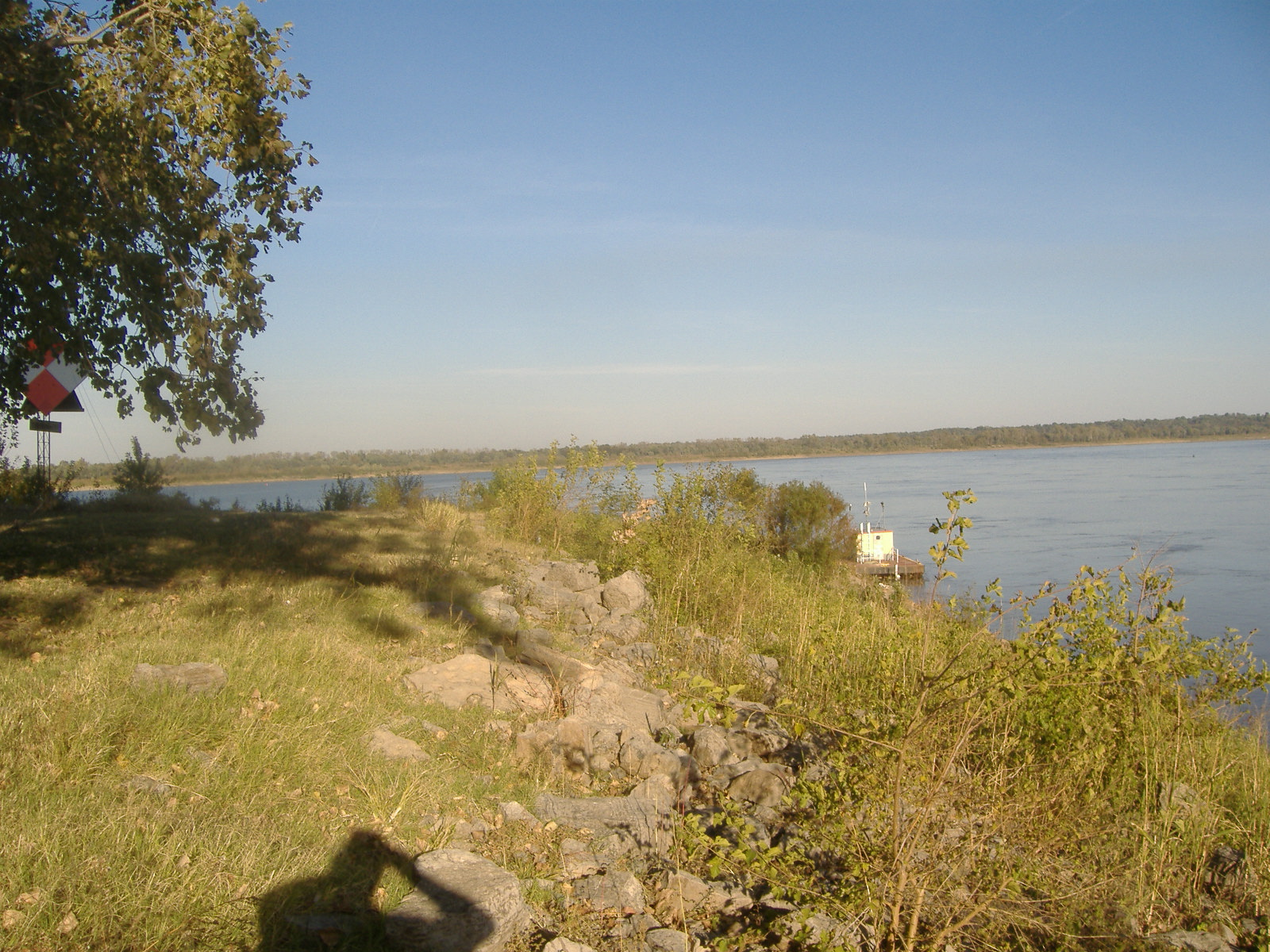
Riverside, looking at the confluence of the Ohio and the Mississippi
