= Hobbs High School =

Public high school in New Mexico, USA

Coordinates: 32°42′36″N 103°07′14″W

- 800 N. Jefferson; Hobbs, New Mexico, 88240; United States

Information
- Type: Public high school
- Established: 1912
- Principal: Zeke Kaney
- Teaching staff: 129.00 (FTE)
- Grades: 10-12
- Enrollment: 2,291 (2023-2024)
- Student to teacher ratio: 17.76
- Campus: Rural (suburban)
- Colors: Black, gold, and white
- Athletics conference: NMAA, 6A Dist. 3
- Nickname: Eagles
- Newspaper: The Eagle's Cry
- Yearbook: Sandstorm
- Website: hobbsschools.net

Hobbs High School (HHS) is located in Hobbs, New Mexico, United States. It had a student population of 2,291 students as of 2020.

In addition to Hobbs it serves Monument, Nadine, and North Hobbs.

== Campus ==
The school has a fairly standard indoor campus with several classrooms that can be entered from the outside. It also has a new auditorium and athletic center.

Until May 2002, Hobbs freshmen went to one of three junior high schools: Highland, Houston, or Heizer. All three housed 7th through 9th grade. The decision was made to convert Heizer Junior High School into a freshman high school to help transition 9th grade students into high school curriculum and behavioral expectations. Heizer was chosen because of its ability to expand, being surrounded by an open field. Both Highland and Houston were surrounded by housing and other problems that would have prevented expansions.

Until the summer of 2011, the freshmen were either bussed or otherwise transported to the campus, which angered many parents because of its location in the extreme southern location of Hobbs. After a few years of discussion, the Hobbs Municipal Schools Board of Education decided that the best way to transition the freshmen to high school would be to build what would be known as the Hobbs Freshman High School (HFHS) next to the existing high school. The first freshman class at the new school entered in August 2011. Heizer, meanwhile, returned to being a junior high school.

== Mascot and colors ==
Hobbs High School's mascot is the Eagle, and the colors are primarily black and gold, with white being a secondary color. One of the more prominent features of the campus is the eagle on a globe statue outside the front of the campus, facing Jefferson Street. Over the years, students from rival high schools have repeatedly painted this statue in their own colors as a prank.

== Athletics ==
HHS competes in the New Mexico Activities Association (NMAA), as a class 6A school in District 3. In 2015, the NMAA realigned the state's schools in to six classifications and adjusted district boundaries for the 2016-2017 and 2017-2018 school years. In addition to Hobbs High School, the schools in District 3-6A include Las Cruces High School, Mayfield High School, Oñate High School, Centennial High School, Gadsden High School, and Carlsbad High School.

Ralph Tasker coached basketball at HHS for 49 years, from 1949 to 1998.

Hobbs High School has a total of 60 state titles and competes in sports as the Eagles and Lady Eagles, which include:

- Eagle tennis
- Lady Eagle volleyball
- The football team has won two state titles. The Eagles play their home games at Watson Memorial Stadium. Players wear a variety of jerseys both at home and on the road, with black and gold being worn at home and white being used for road games. The Eagles have white helmets with an "H" logo and a stylized eagle on the inside.
- The basketball team has won 17 state championships.
- Eagle baseball and softball
- Eagle cross country. The Eagles have won back-to-back state championships as a team and as an individual.
- Swimming and diving team
- Eagle wrestling

== State championships ==
Boys

- Football (2): 1970, 1972
- Soccer (2): 1997 2023
- Basketball (17): 1956, 1957, 1958, 1966, 1968, 1969, 1970, 1980, 1981, 1987, 1988, 1999, 2000, 2001, 2002, 2008, 2015
- Golf (7): 1957, 1961, 1970, 1987, 1988, 2012, 2021
- Track and field (11): 1938, 1939, 1965, 1966, 1972, 1973, 1974, 1980, 1983, 1984, 1992
- Cross country (3): 1965, 2015, 2016

Girls

- Basketball (4): 2003, 2018, 2020, 2023
- Softball (1): 1986
- Tennis (3):1999, 2000, 2001
- Track and field (5): 1975, 1978, 1981, 1989, 1997

Co-ed

- Cheer (3): 2019, 2022, 2023

Academic

- Academic Competition Team (1): 2023

== Notable alumni ==
- Tony Benford, college basketball coach
- Bill Bridges, NBA player
- Tharon Drake, swimmer, US Paralympic medalist 2016
- Rob Evans, American college basketball coach and first black coach at Ole Miss in a major sport
- Gavin Hardison, CFL football quarterback
- Brandon Harper, MLB player (Washington Nationals)
- Aubrey Linne, NFL and CFL player
- Elmore Morgenthaler, professional basketball player
- Guy Penrod, gospel music singer
- Erica Rivinoja, filmmaker
- Larry Robinson, standout college basketball player
- Ronald Ross, professional basketball player
- Timmy Smith, Washington Redskins player; holds Super Bowl record for most rushing yards (208)
- Jeff Taylor, NBA player: Houston Rockets (1982 - 1983), Detroit Pistons (1986 - 1987)
- Jeffery Taylor, son of Jeff Taylor, NBA player: Charlotte Bobcats/Hornets (2012 - 2015)
