= Brantley Lake State Park =

State park in New Mexico, United States

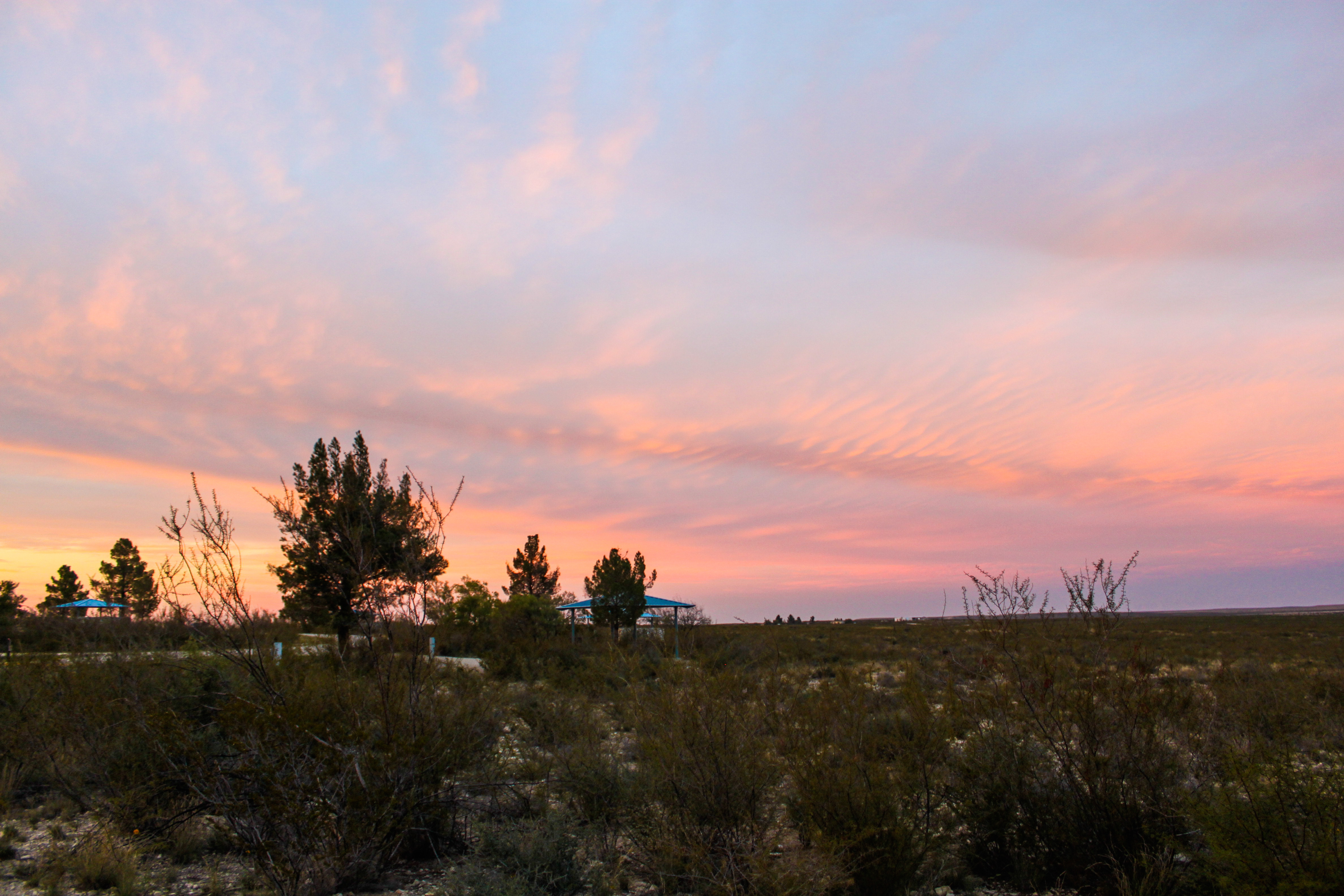
- Sunset at Brantley Lake State Park, October 2012

- Location within New Mexico
- Interactive map of Brantley Lake State Park
- Location: Eddy County, New Mexico, United States
- Coordinates: 32°33′05″N 104°23′02″W
- Area: 3,000 acres (1,200 ha)
- Elevation: 3,295 ft (1,004 m)
- Established: 1989
- Administrator: New Mexico Energy, Minerals and Natural Resources Department
- Website: Official website

Brantley Lake State Park is a state park of New Mexico, United States, located approximately 12 miles (19 km) north of Carlsbad. The park takes its name from Brantley Lake, a man-made reservoir created when Brantley Dam was built across the Pecos River in the 1980s. The lake is the southernmost lake in New Mexico, and it is popular for boating and fishing. It has a surface area of approximately 4,000 acres (1,600 ha), but that varies due to the inconsistent flow of the Pecos River and the arid climate in which the lake is located.

The lake is stocked with bass, white bass, walleye, catfish, bluegill, carp, and crappie. After high levels of DDT were detected in a 2005 study, the State Parks Department recommended that the fish not be eaten; however, that catch-and-release policy was rescinded in 2018.

The park has 51 developed campsites with electricity, shower facilities, a playground, a visitor center, and other amenities.
