= Livingston Wheeler, New Mexico =

- Census-designated place
- Location within New Mexico
- Coordinates: 32°23′40″N 104°11′53″W
- Country: United States
- State: New Mexico
- County: Eddy

Area
  - Total: 1.65 sq mi (4.28 km^{2})
  - Land: 1.65 sq mi (4.28 km^{2})
  - Water: 0 sq mi (0.00 km^{2})
- Elevation: 3,104 ft (946 m)

Population (2020)
  - Total: 691
  - Density: 418.2/sq mi (161.47/km^{2})
- Time zone: UTC-7 (Mountain (MST))
  - Summer (DST): UTC-6 (MDT)
- Area code: 575
- GNIS feature ID: 2584141

Livingston Wheeler is an unincorporated community and census-designated place in Eddy County, New Mexico, United States. As of the 2020 census, Livingston Wheeler had a population of 691. The community is located on the southeastern edge of Carlsbad along New Mexico State Road 216.

== Geography ==
Livingston Wheeler is located southeast of Carlsbad and the Pecos River flows past 3/4 mile to the north. According to the U.S. Census Bureau, the community has an area of 1.626 square miles (4.21 km^{2}), all land.

== Demographics ==
Historical population
Census	Pop.	Note	%±
2020	691		—
U.S. Decennial Census

== Education ==
It is within the Carlsbad Municipal School District, which operates Carlsbad High School.
