= Brantley Dam =

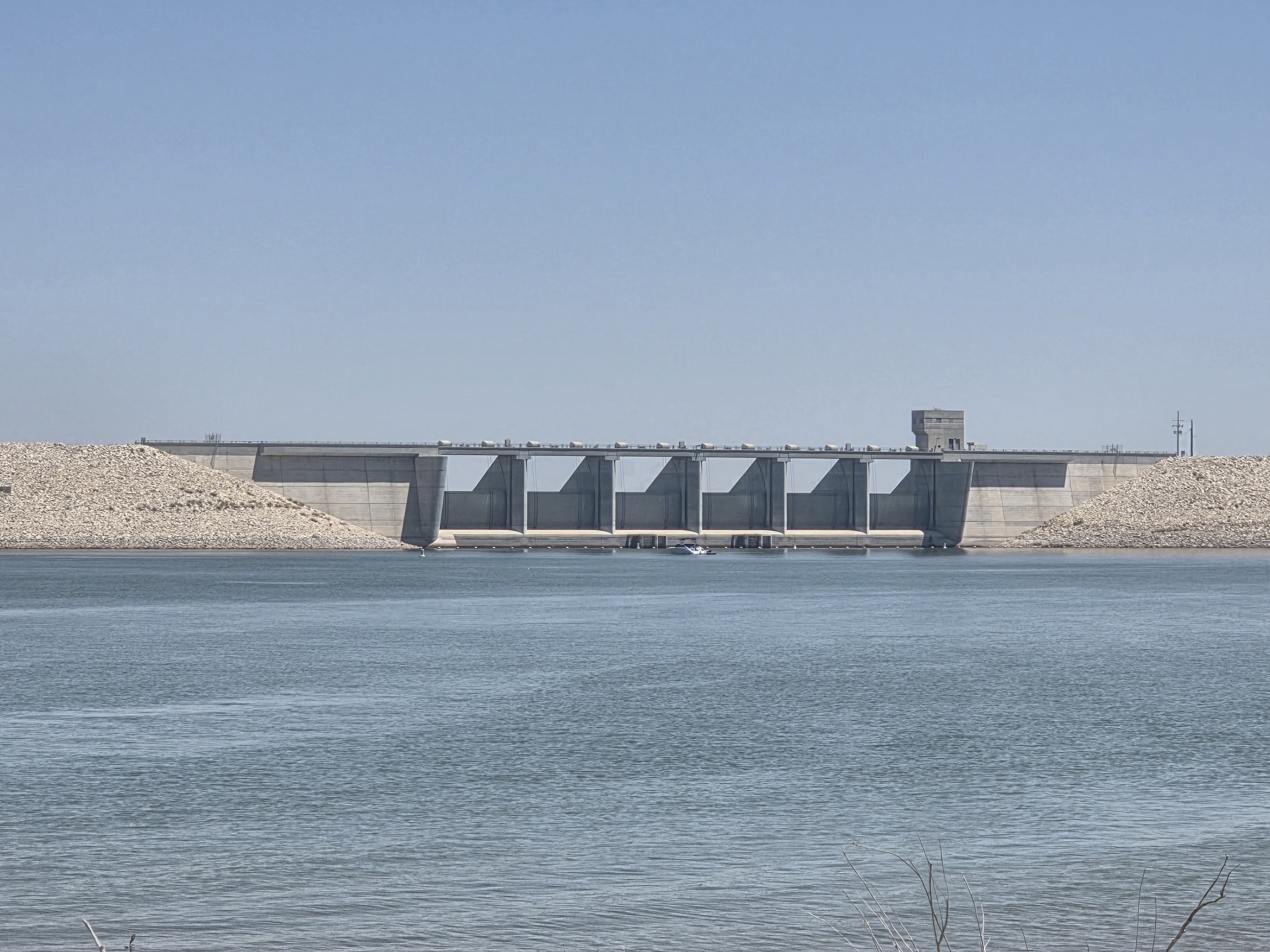
- The central concrete section and spillway of Brantley Dam.

- Location within New Mexico
- Country: United States
- Location: Eddy County, New Mexico
- Coordinates: 32.54419°N 104.381193°W
- Purpose: Irrigation and flood control
- Construction began: 1984
- Opening date: 1987

Dam and spillways
- Height: 143.5 feet (43.7 m)
- Length: 760 feet (230 m)

Reservoir
- Total capacity: 335,054 acre-feet (413,283,000 m^{3})

Brantley Dam is a flood-control and irrigation water-storage dam on the Pecos River in Eddy County, New Mexico, about 13 miles (21 km) north of Carlsbad, New Mexico, and 10 miles (16 km) upstream from Avalon Dam.

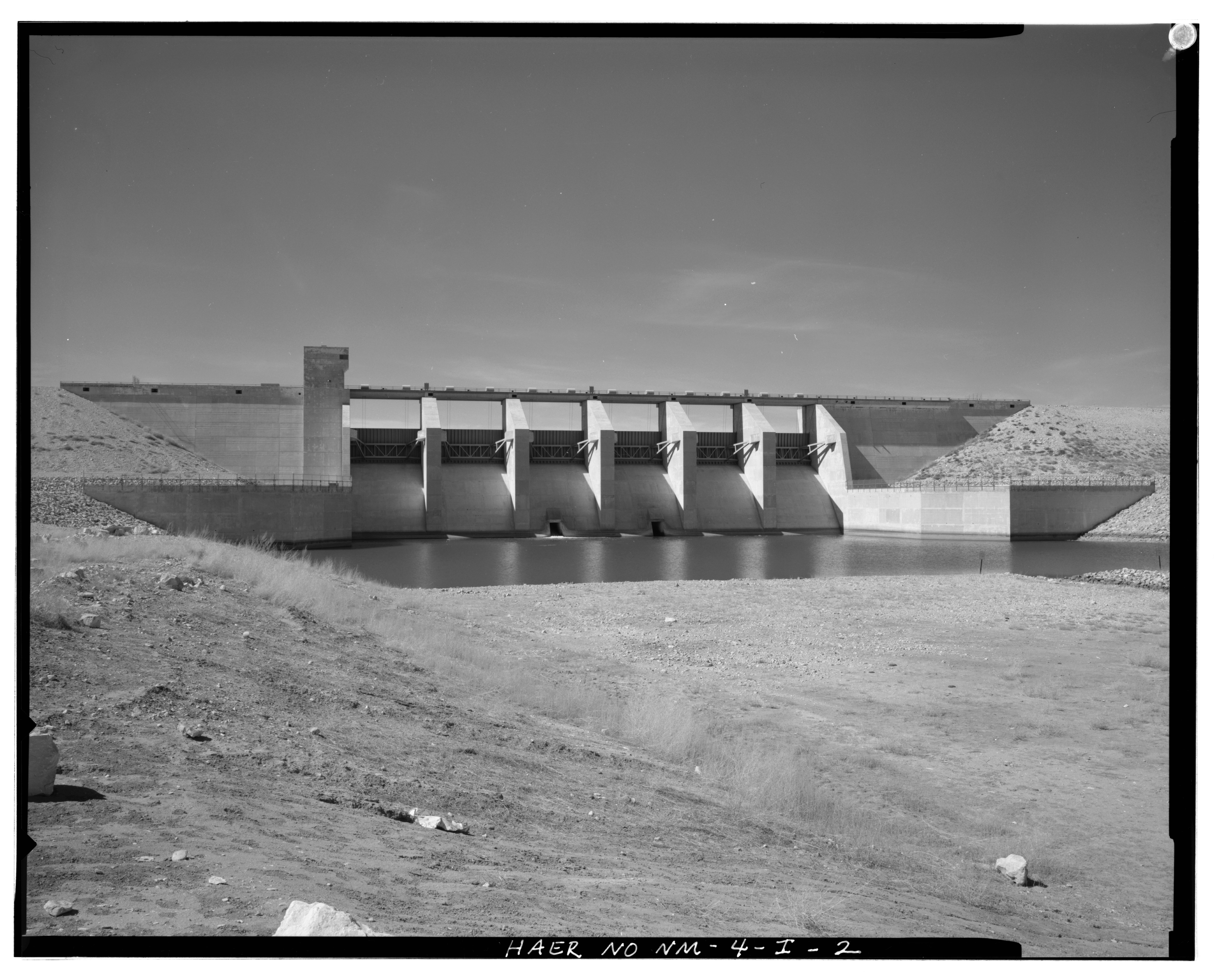
Historical view of the Brantley Dam outlet works.

== Background ==
In the 1960s, the McMillan Reservoir was silting up, reducing its storage capacity. A 1964 study of the McMillan and Avalon Dams concluded: "a potential flood would exceed existing spillway capacity at McMillan Dam and cause the dam to be overtopped, which would cause the failure of both dams." In 1967, the Bureau of Reclamation issued a report proposing a new dam between Avalon and McMillan that would completely inundate the McMillan Reservoir. Congressional approval for the project was given in 1972, with about $45 million of federal funding authorized. Planning continued throughout the 1970s.

By the early 1980s, land had been acquired, the site was cleared, and archaeological mitigation work was underway. Utility lines were moved, highways US 285 and NM 137 were rerouted, and a $15,000,000 realignment of the Santa Fe Railway was constructed. In 1984, construction on the dam began. Concrete work was completed by autumn 1987, and soon after, the Pecos River was diverted through the new Brantley floodgates for the first time. That winter, another channel was dredged through the McMillan silt to ease the water flow into Brantley.

== Structure ==
Brantley Dam has a concrete gravity center section flanked by rolled earth-fill wings to the east and west, with a total length of about 4 miles (6.4 km). The central concrete section is about 143.5 feet (43.7 m) high and 760 feet (230 m) long. The earth-fill wings have a maximum height of 118.5 feet (36.1 m) and a crest width of 30 feet (9.1 m). The concrete section has a central overflow spillway controlled by six radial gates that give a maximum discharge capacity of 352,000 cubic feet (10,000 m^{3}) per second. The dam's outlet works have two 4 by 4 feet (1.2 by 1.2 m) conduits with a capacity of 1,230 cubic feet (35 m^{3}) per second.

== Reservoir ==
The dam impounds Brantley Lake in an area that extends about 16.5 miles (26.6 km) above the dam. Benefits include irrigation, flood control, fish and wildlife enhancement, and recreation. A part of the dam and surrounding land form the Brantley Lake State Park. Brantley Lake has 335,054 acre-feet (413,283,000 m^{3}) of capacity assigned to flood-control functions.
