= Happy Valley, New Mexico =

- Census-designated place
- Location within New Mexico
- Coordinates: 32°25′26″N 104°17′27″W
- Country: United States
- State: New Mexico
- County: Eddy

Area
  - Total: 2.15 sq mi (5.56 km^{2})
  - Land: 2.15 sq mi (5.56 km^{2})
  - Water: 0.0039 sq mi (0.01 km^{2})
- Elevation: 3,209 ft (978 m)

Population (2020)
  - Total: 617
  - Density: 287.6/sq mi (111.06/km^{2})
- Time zone: UTC-7 (Mountain (MST))
  - Summer (DST): UTC-6 (MDT)
- Area code: 575
- GNIS feature ID: 2584108

Happy Valley is an unincorporated community and census-designated place in Eddy County, New Mexico, United States. As of the 2020 census, Happy Valley had a population of 617. The community is located on the western edge of Carlsbad; New Mexico State Road 524 passes through the area. The town was settled as a farming community before potash was manufactured here. It was named because the lack of land use regulations made residents happy.

== Geography ==
The community is approximately two miles west of the west edge of Carlsbad. According to the U.S. Census Bureau, the community has an area of 2.159 square miles (5.59 km^{2}), of which 2.156 square miles (5.58 km^{2}) are land and 0.003 square miles (0.0078 km^{2}) are water.

== Demographics ==
Historical population
Census	Pop.	Note	%±
2020	617		—
U.S. Decennial Census

== Education ==
It is within the Carlsbad Municipal School District, which operates Carlsbad High School.
