= Malaga, New Mexico =

- Census-designated place
- Location within New Mexico
- Coordinates: 32°13′22″N 104°04′09″W
- Country: United States
- State: New Mexico
- County: Eddy

Area
  - Total: 2.97 sq mi (7.70 km^{2})
  - Land: 2.97 sq mi (7.70 km^{2})
  - Water: 0 sq mi (0.00 km^{2})
- Elevation: 3,002 ft (915 m)

Population (2020)
  - Total: 112
  - Density: 37.7/sq mi (14.55/km^{2})
- Time zone: UTC-7 (Mountain (MST))
  - Summer (DST): UTC-6 (MDT)
- ZIP code: 88263
- Area code: 575
- GNIS feature ID: 2584152

Malaga is a census-designated place and unincorporated community in Eddy County, New Mexico, United States. As of the 2020 census, Malaga had a population of 112. Malaga has a post office with ZIP code 88263. U.S. Route 285 passes through the community. Formerly known as Kirkwell, Malaga was founded in the 1890s by Swiss immigrants and was named after the Spanish city of Málaga. Italian laborers were recruited to farm the area, and many settled in Malaga.

It is within the Carlsbad Municipal School District, which operates Carlsbad High School.

Malaga is on the Pecos Highway approximately 18 miles southeast of Carlsbad. The Pecos River flows past two miles east of the community.

== Demographics ==
Historical population
Census	Pop.	Note	%±
2020	112		—
U.S. Decennial Census
