= Lakewood, New Mexico =

- Unincorporated community
- Location within the state of New Mexico Lakewood (the United States)
- Coordinates: 32°37′56″N 104°22′10″W
- Country: United States
- State: New Mexico
- County: Eddy
- Elevation: 3,291 ft (1,003 m)
- Time zone: UTC-7 (Mountain (MST))
  - Summer (DST): UTC-6 (MDT)
- ZIP codes: 88254
- Area code: 575
- GNIS feature ID: 910917

Lakewood is an unincorporated community located in Eddy County, New Mexico, United States. The community is located on New Mexico State Road 381 near U.S. Route 285, 16.8 miles (27.0 km) north-northwest of Carlsbad. Lakewood has a post office with ZIP code 88254.
