= New Mexico State Road 216 =

State highway in New Mexico, United States

State Road 216

Route information
- Maintained by NMDOT
- Length: 6.442 mi (10.367 km)

Major junctions
- South end: US 285 near Loving
- North end: US 62 / US 180 / US 285 near Carlsbad

Location
- Country: United States
- State: New Mexico
- Counties: Eddy

Highway system
- New Mexico State Highway System; Interstate; US; State; Scenic
← NM 215	→ NM 217

State Road 216 (NM 216) is a 6.442-mile-long (10.367 km) state highway in the US state of New Mexico. NM 216's southern terminus is at U.S. Route 285 (US 285) northwest of Loving, and the northern terminus is at US 62, US 180 and US 285 south of Carlsbad.State Road 216 is known locally as Wood Ave and Grandi Rd

== Major intersections ==
The entire route is in Eddy County.

Location	mi	km	Destinations	Notes
	0.000	0.000	US 285	Southern terminus
	6.442	10.367	US 62 / US 180 / US 285	Northern terminus
1.000 mi = 1.609 km; 1.000 km = 0.621 mi
