= New Mexico State Road 7 =

State highway in New Mexico, United States

State Road 7
- Carlsbad Caverns Highway
- NM 7 highlighted in red

Route information
- Maintained by NMDOT
- Length: 7.199 mi (11.586 km)
- Existed: June 1929–present

Major junctions
- East end: US 62 / US 180 at Whites City
- West end: Carlsbad Caverns National Park

Location
- Country: United States
- State: New Mexico
- Counties: Eddy

Highway system
- New Mexico State Highway System; Interstate; US; State; Scenic
← NM 6	→ NM 8

New Mexico State Road 7 (NM 7) is a 7.199-mile-long (11.586 km) paved, two-lane state highway in Eddy County in the U.S. state of New Mexico. NM 7 east terminus is in Whites City at the road's junction with U.S. Route 62 and U.S. Route 180 which run concurrently at that location. The road travels mostly west from there in a somewhat winding path leading to Carlsbad Caverns National Park Visitors Center.

== Route description ==
NM 7 starts at the intersection with US 62/US 180 in Whites City right across from Whites City Fire Department. The highway travels north-northwest through Whites City and after 0.5 miles (0.80 km) reaches the boundary of the Carlsbad Caverns National Park. From there the road follows the bottom of the Walnut Canyon winding through the northeastern end of the Guadalupe Ridge mountains slowly changing direction from northern to western. Shortly after passing a 5 mile mark, the highway turns sharply south climbing up the ridge, swings east and arrives at the Visitors Center.

== History ==
The original Route 7 traveled between Route 1 in Alameda through San Ysidro and Jemez to Jemez Springs as can be seen on 1918 and 1923 maps. In 1927, a section between San Ysidro and Alameda was reassigned to Route 44. In 1929 the road was redesignated as Route 4.

After the Carlsbad Caverns National Park was established in 1923 a road was built connecting it to Route 18 (modern day US 62 /US 180). This road was designated as NM 7 in June 1929 by the New Mexico State Highway Commission.

On December 9, 1981, New Mexico State Highway Commission approved the following resolution:

That State Road 7, from its intersection with U.S. 62/180 west to the eastern boundary of Carlsbad Caverns National Park, a distance of 0.5 miles [800 m], is designated as Carlsbad Caverns Highway.

== Major intersections ==
The entire route is in Eddy County.

Location	mi	km	Destinations	Notes
Carlsbad Caverns National Park	7.199	11.586	Carlsbad Caverns Visitor Center	Western terminus
Whites City	0.000	0.000	US 62 / US 180 (National Parks Highway) – Carlsbad, El Paso	Eastern terminus
1.000 mi = 1.609 km; 1.000 km = 0.621 mi
