= Alejandro R. Ruiz =

United States Army soldier

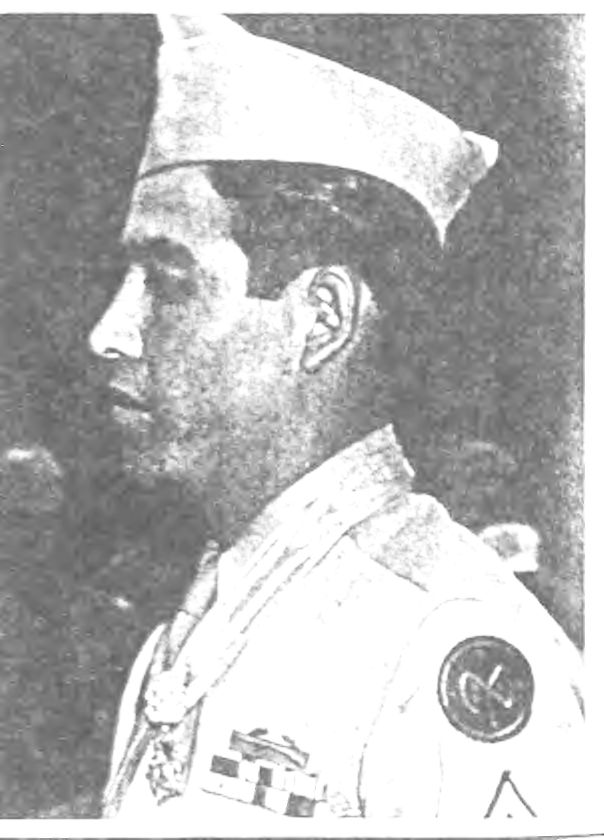
- PFC Alejandro R. Ruiz, Medal of Honor recipient
- Born: June 26, 1923; Loving, New Mexico
- Died: November 20, 2009 (aged 86); Yountville, California
- Burial place: Veterans Memorial Grove Cemetery, Yountville, California
- Military career
- Allegiance: United States of America
- Branch: United States Army
- Service years: 1944 - 1964
- Rank: Master sergeant
- Units: 1st Battalion, 165th Infantry Regiment, 27th Infantry Division
- Conflicts: World War II; *Battle of Okinawa; Korean War
- Awards: Medal of Honor; Bronze Star Medal; Purple Heart

Sergeant Alejandro Renteria Ruiz (June 26, 1923 – November 20, 2009) was a United States Army soldier who received the Medal of Honor, the United States' highest military decoration, for his actions in the Battle of Okinawa in the Ryukyu Islands during World War II.

== Early years ==
Ruiz, a Mexican-American, was born and raised in Loving, New Mexico, and enlisted in the United States Army in the town of Carlsbad, New Mexico upon the outbreak of World War II. He was assigned to the U.S. 27th Infantry Division after completing basic training.

== World War II ==
During World War II, the conquest of the Japanese island of Okinawa was considered vital for the Allied forces as a step towards an invasion of the Japanese mainland. The invasion (codenamed Operation Iceberg) was the largest amphibious operation of the Pacific war, and involved units of the U.S. Tenth Army, commanded by Lieutenant General Simon Bolivar Buckner, Jr. These consisted of III Amphibious Corps (1st and 6th Marine Divisions, with 2nd Marine Division as an afloat reserve), and XXIV Corps (7th, 77th, 96th and 27th Infantry Divisions).

On April 28, 1945, PFC Ruiz's unit was pinned down by machine gun fire coming from a camouflaged Japanese pillbox and was unable to advance to its assigned objective. Ruiz, on his own initiative, charged the pillbox under a hail of machine gun fire. On his second attempt, he was able to neutralize the pillbox by killing all of its occupants. For his actions he was awarded the Medal of Honor. On June 26, 1946, President Harry S. Truman presented Ruiz with the Medal of Honor in a ceremony held at the White House.

=== Medal of Honor citation ===
ALEJANDRO R. RUIZ
Rank and organization: Private First Class, U.S. Army, 165th Infantry, 27th Infantry Division
Place and date: Okinawa, Ryukyu Islands, April 28, 1945
Entered service at: Carlsbad, New Mexico
Born: June 26, 1923, Loving, New Mexico
G.O. No. 60, June 26, 1946.
Citation:

When his unit was stopped by a skillfully camouflaged enemy pillbox, he displayed conspicuous gallantry and intrepidity above and beyond the call of duty. His squad, suddenly brought under a hail of machinegun fire and a vicious grenade attack, was pinned down. Jumping to his feet, Pfc. Ruiz seized an automatic rifle and lunged through the flying grenades and rifle and automatic fire for the top of the emplacement. When an enemy soldier charged him, his rifle jammed. Undaunted, Pfc. Ruiz whirled on his assailant and clubbed him down. Then he ran back through bullets and grenades, seized more ammunition and another automatic rifle, and again made for the pillbox. Enemy fire now was concentrated on him, but he charged on, miraculously reaching the position, and in plain view he climbed to the top. Leaping from one opening to another, he sent burst after burst into the pillbox, killing 12 of the enemy and completely destroying the position. Pfc. Ruiz's heroic conduct, in the face of overwhelming odds, saved the lives of many comrades and eliminated an obstacle that long would have checked his unit's advance.

== Korean War ==
He served in the Korean War, finally retiring in the mid-1960s as a master sergeant.

== Postwar ==
Ruiz resided in Visalia, California and actively participated in activities honoring Medal of Honor recipients. Ruiz died on November 20, 2009, of congestive heart failure. The town of Visalia has honored Ruiz by naming the "Alejandro R. Ruiz Sr. Park" after him, located at North Burke Street and Buena Vista Street.

== Awards and decorations ==
Among PFC Alejandro R. Ruiz' decorations and medals were the following:

Badge	Combat Infantryman Badge with star denoting 2nd award		
1st row	Medal of Honor		
2nd row	Bronze Star Medal Retroactively Awarded, 1947	Purple Heart	Army Commendation Medal with 1 Oak leaf cluster
3rd row	Army Good Conduct Medal with 6 Good Conduct Loops	American Campaign Medal	Asiatic-Pacific Campaign Medal with 1 Campaign star
4th row	World War II Victory Medal	Army of Occupation Medal	National Defense Service Medal with 1 Oak leaf cluster
5th row	Korean Service Medal	United Nations Service Medal Korea	Korean War Service Medal Retroactively Awarded, 2003
6th row	Presidential Unit Citation		Korean Presidential Unit Citation

=== Patches ===

27th Infantry Division Insignia

== Honors ==
Ruiz resided in Visalia, California and actively participated in activities honoring Medal of Honor recipients. Ruiz died on November 20, 2009, of congestive heart failure. The town of Visalia has honored Ruiz by naming the "Alejandro R. Ruiz Sr. Park" after him, located at North Burke Street and Buena Vista Street.

== See also ==
- List of Medal of Honor recipients for World War II
- Hispanic Medal of Honor recipients
- Hispanic Americans in World War II
