= La Huerta, New Mexico =

- Census-designated place
- Location of La Huerta, New Mexico

- Location in the United States
- Coordinates: 32°26′56″N 104°13′21″W
- Country: United States
- State: New Mexico
- County: Eddy

Area
  - Total: 1.53 sq mi (3.95 km^{2})
  - Land: 1.53 sq mi (3.95 km^{2})
  - Water: 0 sq mi (0.00 km^{2})
- Elevation: 3,117 ft (950 m)

Population (2020)
  - Total: 1,448
  - Density: 950.4/sq mi (366.95/km^{2})
- Time zone: UTC-7 (Mountain (MST))
  - Summer (DST): UTC-6 (MDT)
- Area code: 575
- FIPS code: 35-37420
- GNIS feature ID: 2407964

La Huerta, formerly known as Carlsbad North, is an unincorporated area and census-designated place (CDP) in Eddy County, New Mexico, United States. As of the 2020 census, La Huerta had a population of 1,448. The community, whose name means "fruit garden" in Spanish, was named after the orchards and garden plots that supplied food to Carlsbad.

== Geography ==
La Huerta is located in central Eddy County and is bordered to the south by the city of Carlsbad, the county seat. The Pecos River flows past 3/4 mile to the south.

According to the United States Census Bureau, the CDP has a total area of 1.5 square miles (4.0 km^{2}), all land.

== Demographics ==
Historical population
| Census | Pop. | Note | %± |
|---|---|---|---|
| 2020 | 1,448 | | — |
U.S. Decennial Census

As of the census of 2000, there were 1,245 people, 484 households, and 377 families residing in the CDP. The population density was 851.1 inhabitants per square mile (328.6/km^{2}). There were 526 housing units at an average density of 359.6 per square mile (138.8/km^{2}). The racial makeup of the CDP was 92.61% White, 0.32% African American, 0.32% Native American, 0.80% Asian, 0.40% Pacific Islander, 4.58% from other races, and 0.96% from two or more races. Hispanic or Latino of any race were 14.54% of the population.

There were 484 households, out of which 31.2% had children under the age of 18 living with them, 69.4% were married couples living together, 5.4% had a female householder with no husband present, and 22.1% were non-families. 20.5% of all households were made up of individuals, and 8.3% had someone living alone who was 65 years of age or older. The average household size was 2.57 and the average family size was 2.97.

In the CDP, the population was spread out, with 26.3% under the age of 18, 5.2% from 18 to 24, 21.4% from 25 to 44, 31.0% from 45 to 64, and 16.0% who were 65 years of age or older. The median age was 44 years. For every 100 females, there were 100.2 males. For every 100 females age 18 and over, there were 100.7 males.

The median income for a household in the CDP was $52,361, and the median income for a family was $69,135. Males had a median income of $51,250 versus $28,125 for females. The per capita income for the CDP was $27,192. About 2.9% of families and 3.6% of the population were below the poverty line, including 1.9% of those under age 18 and none of those age 65 or over.

== Education ==
It is within the Carlsbad Municipal School District, which operates Carlsbad High School.
