= Carlsbad High School =

Carlsbad High School may refer to:

- Carlsbad High School (California)
- Carlsbad High School (Carlsbad, New Mexico)
