= Dave Sherer =

American football player (born 1937)

No. 86
- Positions: End, punter

Personal information
- Born: February 14, 1937 (age 89); Galion, Ohio, U.S.
- Listed height: 6 ft 3 in (1.91 m)
- Listed weight: 210 lb (95 kg)

Career information
- High school: Carlsbad (NM)
- College: New Mexico Military Institute (1955-1956); SMU (1957-1958)
- NFL draft: 1959: 2nd round, 24th overall pick

Career history
- Baltimore Colts (1959); Dallas Cowboys (1960)

Awards and highlights
- NFL champion (1959)

Career NFL statistics
- Punts: 108
- Punt yards: 4,552
- Longest punt: 67
- Stats at Pro Football Reference

David McDonald Sherer, Jr. (born February 14, 1937) is an American former professional football player who was an end and punter in the National Football League (NFL) for the Baltimore Colts and Dallas Cowboys. He played college football at Southern Methodist University.

== Early life ==
Sherer attended Carlsbad High school, where he practiced football and basketball. He contributed to his school winning two state basketball championships. In football, he played as a running back.

He accepted a scholarship from the New Mexico Military Institute and transferred to Southern Methodist University after his sophomore year.

As a junior, he was the nation's top punter with an average of 50.1 yards (a school record) on 36 punts. His long was an 81-yard punt. As a senior, he was limited with injuries.

In 1999, he was ranked 47th on the Sports Illustrated list of New Mexico's 50 greatest athletes.

== Professional career ==
=== Baltimore Colts ===
Sherer was selected by the Baltimore Colts in the second round (24th overall) of the 1959 NFL draft. He was the starter at punter as a rookie, registering 51 punts for 2,132 yards (41.8-yard average), with a long of 60 yards and contributed to winning the NFL championship.

=== Dallas Cowboys ===
Sherer was selected by the Dallas Cowboys in the 1960 NFL expansion draft, becoming the first starting punter in franchise history. In the inaugural season, he posted 57 punts for 2,420 (42.5-yard average) with a long of 67 yards. He missed the final game of the season, after being called to active-duty training with the Texas Air National Guard.

He was released on September 16, 1961, to make room for the offensive end Ola Lee Murchinson.
