= Whites City, New Mexico =

- Census-designated place
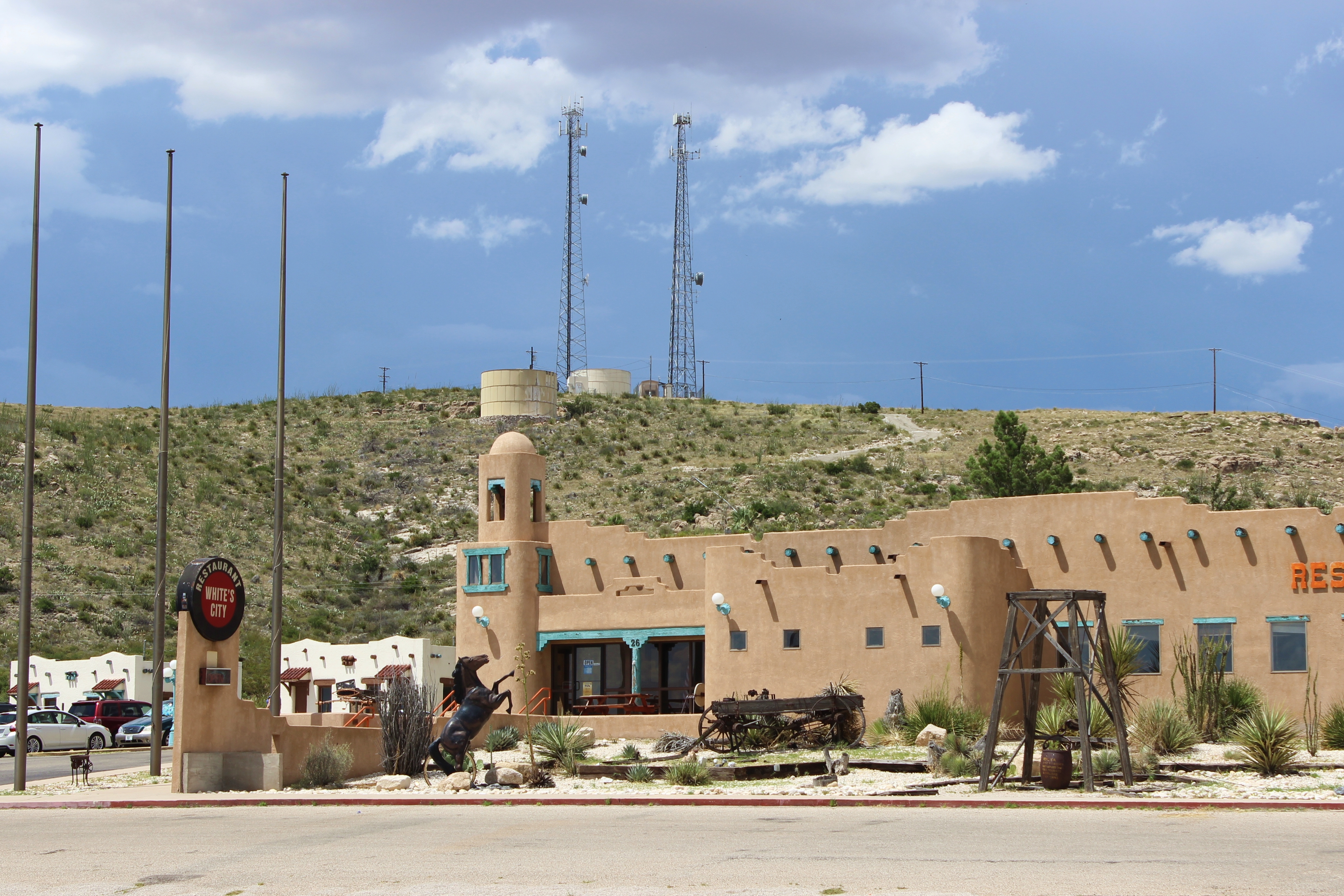
- White's City, en route to Carlsbad Caverns National Park

- Flag

- Location within New Mexico
- Coordinates: 32°10′36″N 104°22′36″W
- Country: United States
- State: New Mexico
- County: Eddy

Area
  - Total: 0.43 sq mi (1.12 km^{2})
  - Land: 0.43 sq mi (1.12 km^{2})
  - Water: 0 sq mi (0.00 km^{2})
- Elevation: 3,662 ft (1,116 m)

Population (2020)
  - Total: 14
  - Density: 32.3/sq mi (12.46/km^{2})
- Time zone: UTC-7 (Mountain (MST))
  - Summer (DST): UTC-6 (MDT)
- ZIP code: 88268
- Area code: 575
- GNIS feature ID: 2584237

Whites City also spelled White's City, is a census-designated place and unincorporated community in Eddy County, New Mexico, United States. Whites City has a post office with ZIP code 88268. As of the 2020 census, Whites City had a population of 14.

Whites City began in the 1920s as a commercial resort owned by Charlie White. The community is primarily a resort town for visitors to nearby Carlsbad Caverns National Park. U.S. Route 62, 180, and New Mexico State Road 7 all pass through the community.

It is within the Carlsbad Municipal School District, which operates Carlsbad High School.

== Demographics ==
Historical population
Census	Pop.	Note	%±
2020	14		—
U.S. Decennial Census
