= Jefferson Montessori Academy =

Coordinates: 32°25′44.8″N 104°13′52.8″W

Information
- School type: Charter school
- Established: 2002; 24 years ago
- School district: Carlsbad Municipal School District
- Grades: K-12

Jefferson Montessori Academy is a K-12 charter school located in Carlsbad, New Mexico. It was the first Montessori public school in New Mexico and is one of two charter schools in Carlsbad. The school serves students in grades K-12 and is part of the Carlsbad Municipal School District.

It was founded by Arleen Standiford, Patricia Verch, and Catherine Novich Brown. The principal is Kelli Barta. The charter school proposal was originally denied in October 2000, but was approved the following year in December 2001. The school opened to students in August 2002. For its first few years it operated in a privately owned facility, but it is now in a school-district-owned facility.

In 2010, Jefferson Montessori Academy was named "Charter School of the Year" by The New Mexico Coalition for Charter Schools.
