= Mark Jackson (quarterback) =

American gridiron football player (born 1954)

No. 8, 7
- Position: Quarterback

Personal information
- Born: June 12, 1954 (age 72); Carlsbad, New Mexico, U.S.
- Listed height: 6 ft 0 in (1.83 m)
- Listed weight: 190 lb (86 kg)

Career information
- High school: Carlsbad
- College: UTEP (1972); Baylor (1973–1976)
- NFL draft: 1977: undrafted

Career history
- 1977: Montreal Alouettes
- 1978: St. Louis Cardinals*
- 1979–1980: Toronto Argonauts
- 1981–1983: Winnipeg Blue Bombers
- * Offseason or practice squad member only

Charles Mark Jackson (born June 12, 1954) is an American former professional football player who was a quarterback for six seasons in the Canadian Football League (CFL) with the Montreal Alouettes, Toronto Argonauts, and Winnipeg Blue Bombers. After leading Carlsbad High School to an undefeated record as a senior in 1971, he played college football at the University of Texas at El Paso and was the school's first-ever freshman varsity letterman in any sport. He then transferred to play at Baylor University, where he was a two-year starter. At the conclusion of his college career, Jackson led the West team to victory in the East-West Shrine Game.

After going undrafted in the 1977 NFL draft, Jackson signed with the Alouettes. He started two games for the Alouettes during the 1977 season, and then spent the 1978 offseason with the NFL's St. Louis Cardinals. He returned to the CFL in 1979 with the Argonauts, spending his first season as a backup and leading the Eastern Football Conference in passing yards during his second season. Jackson was then traded to the Blue Bombers, where he backed up Dieter Brock from 1981 to 1982. After Brock retired, Jackson started the 1983 season opener but was then released.

== Early life ==
Charles Mark Jackson was born on June 12, 1954, in Carlsbad, New Mexico. He played high school football at Carlsbad High School. He led the school to an undefeated season in 1971 and earned all-state honors. Jackson also set the school's single-season and career records for both passing and total offense.

== College career ==
Jackson first played college football for the UTEP Miners of the University of Texas at El Paso as a freshman in 1972. He saw action throughout the 1972 season and started UTEP's final game of the year after senior quarterback Gary Keithley suffered a broken hand. Overall in 1972, Jackson completed 24 of 70 passes (34.3%) for 283 yards, two touchdowns, and two interceptions while also rushing for 33 yards and two touchdowns. He was the first freshman in UTEP history to earn a varsity letter in any sport. He was the first-string quarterback at spring practices in 1973.

In May 1973, Jackson transferred to Baylor University for personal reasons. He had to sit out, and redshirt, the 1973 season due to NCAA transfer rules. He ran the scout team in 1973. As a sophomore in 1974, Jackson was the backup to Neal Jeffrey, completing 10 of 18 passes (55.6%) for 134 yards, one touchdown, and three interceptions while rushing for 129 yards and one touchdown. Jackson took over as starter in 1975. He missed some time after breaking his collarbone in the first game of the season. Overall in 1975, he recorded 70 completions on 151 passing attempts (46.4%) for 1,021 yards, four touchdowns, and nine interceptions while also running for 385 yards and two touchdowns. As a senior in 1976, Jackson completed 105 of 211 passes (49.8%) for 1,132 yards, six touchdowns, and 11 interceptions while rushing for 426 yards and three touchdowns. He led the 1976 Bears to a 7–3–1 record.

Jackson was selected to play in the East-West Shrine Game after his senior year. Jackson was the starter for the West team, completing 13 of 26 passes for 116 yards as the West won 30–14. The East quarterbacks only completed two of 17 passes for a 48-yard touchdown. Jackson had planned to split time with Joe Roth during the game but Roth pulled a back muscle prior to the contest. Roth died of cancer a month later.

== Professional career ==
After going undrafted in the 1977 NFL draft, Jackson signed a two-year contract with the Montreal Alouettes of the Canadian Football League (CFL) on May 16, 1977. After Sonny Wade and Joe Barnes both suffered injuries, Jackson temporarily took over as starter for two games in October 1977. Jackson was waived by the Alouettes before the start of the playoffs to meet the 39-player postseason roster limit. He dressed in eight games overall during the 1977 season, totaling 33 completions on 76 passing attempts (43.4%) for 361 yards, two touchdowns, and three interceptions, and 38 rushing attempts for 134 yards and one touchdown.

Jackson signed with the St. Louis Cardinals of the National Football League on May 15, 1978. He was cut by the Cardinals on August 23, 1978. After Cardinals quarterback Jim Hart suffered an injury in October 1978, head coach Bud Wilkinson tried to re-sign Jackson. However, Wilkinson was informed that, once the trade deadline had passed, no team could sign a player who had been on the roster previously. The trade deadline had passed eight days earlier, so the Cardinals signed Mark Manges instead.

On March 21, 1979, Jackson signed a two-year deal with the CFL's Toronto Argonauts. He dressed in all 16 games during the 1979 season as the backup to Tony Adams, completing 18 of 38 passes (47.4%) for 215 yards and four interceptions while also rushing nine times for 39 yards and two touchdowns. Jackson took over as the starter in 1980 after Adams suffered a separated shoulder during the preseason. Jackson started 12 games during the 1980 season and also saw action in the other four games that Adams started. Overall in 1980, Jackson recorded 231 of 404 passes (57.2%) for 3,041 yards, 16 touchdowns, and 17 interceptions while carrying the ball 62 times for 393 yards and two touchdowns. Jackson's 3,041 passing yards were the most in the Eastern Football Conference that year. Toronto finished the 1980 season with a 6–10 record. The Argonauts signed Condredge Holloway during the offseason.

On June 29, 1981, Jackson was traded to the Winnipeg Blue Bombers for Winnipeg's first-round pick in the 1982 CFL draft. He dressed in all 16 games during the 1981 season as the backup to Dieter Brock, completing 37 of 52 passes (71.2%) for 435 yards, four touchdowns, and no interceptions. Jackson signed a new two-year contract with Winnipeg on March 18, 1982. He dressed in 14 games as the backup to Brock in 1982, completing 22 of 40 passes (55.0%) for 266 yards and one interception. After Brock went into a self-imposed retirement in spring 1983 to try to get out of his contract with the Blue Bombers, Jackson became the team's new starter. He started the season opener against the Ottawa Rough Riders but only completed four of 11 passes for seven yards before being benched for Nickie Hall. After Brock returned to the team, Jackson was released on July 20, 1983.

On July 29, 1983, it was reported that Jackson had turned down an offer to be the Montreal Concordes' starting quarterback. Jackson stated that he wanted to try to sign with a United States Football League (USFL) team instead. In August 1983, he verbally agreed to a contract with the Washington Federals of the USFL. However, he never played for the Federals.

== Coaching career ==
Jackson spent time as a volunteer football coach at his alma mater, Carlsbad High, during his pro career. He was later a football coach for 16 years at Wheaton Warrenville South High School in Wheaton, Illinois. He was the linebackers coach for his first eight years and then the defensive coordinator from 2008 to 2016. He helped Wheaton Warrenville South win three state titles. In 2017, Jackson became an assistant football coach at Wheaton College. His son Brett had previously played football at Wheaton College, graduating in 2008.
