= Loving Municipal Schools =

School district in New Mexico, United States

Loving Municipal Schools (LMS) is a school district headquartered in Loving, New Mexico.

Located in Eddy County, the district includes Loving and unincorporated areas.

== History ==
In 2017 the district administration deliberated on whether to change from a five day school week to a four day school week.

Ann Lynn McIlroy served as superintendent until 2018, when she became superintendent of Roswell Independent School District.

Lee White served as the principal of the high school until 2018, when he became the superintendent. Multiple employees recommended that he be hired, sending letters and appearing at board meetings.

== Schools ==
- Loving High School
- Loving Middle School
- Loving Elementary School
