= Riverside, Eddy County, New Mexico =

Unincorporated community in New Mexico, United States

Riverside, New Mexico
- Unincorporated community
- Location within the state of New Mexico Riverside (the United States)
- Coordinates: 32°50′10″N 104°18′38″W
- Country: United States
- State: New Mexico
- List of counties in New Mexico: Eddy
- Elevation: 3,330 ft (1,015 m)
- Time zone: UTC-7 (MST)
  - Summer (DST): UTC-6 (MDT)
- ZIP codes: 88210
- Area code: 575

Riverside is an unincorporated community in Eddy County, New Mexico, in the southwestern United States. It is located on the left bank (east side) of the Pecos River about five miles east of Artesia, New Mexico on U.S. Route 82 (Lovington Highway). Riverside is in the Loco Hills Division of Eddy County.

The community of Riverside grew up in the 1970s as a place for oil workers' mobile homes and oil field support. It was almost abandoned in the early 1980s, but came back in the 1990s as oil prices rose. Mack Energy Corporation has its corporate offices in Riverside.
