= Brantley Lake =

- Location within New Mexico Location within the United States
- Location: Eddy County, New Mexico
- Coordinates: 32.57618°N 104.38866°W
- Type: Irrigation Reservoir
- Primary inflows: Pecos River
- Primary outflows: Pecos River
- Basin countries: United States
- Surface area: 4,000 acres (16 km^{2})
- Water volume: 335,054 acre⋅ft (413,283,000 m^{3})
- Surface elevation: 3,300 ft (1,000 m)

Brantley Lake is a reservoir on the Pecos River located within Brantley Lake State Park (32.545115°N 104.374403°W) approximately 12 miles (19 km) north of Carlsbad, New Mexico off US 285.

It is impounded by Brantley Dam, completed in the 1980s as part of the Brantley Project of the United States Bureau of Reclamation. The project's main purpose was to replace the old McMillan Dam, which had been declared unsafe. Additional benefits include irrigation, flood control, fish and wildlife enhancement, and recreation.

Brantley Lake has a 335,054 acre-feet (413,283,000 m^{3}) capacity assigned to flood control functions.

Brantley Lake State Park is located in the Chihuahuan Desert region of southeastern New Mexico.

Anglers can catch a variety of warm water fish such as largemouth bass, walleye, channel catfish, white bass, bluegill, and crappie.

Brantley Lake is part of the larger Brantley Wildlife area that stretches approximately 11 miles (18 km) North-South in south eastern New Mexico.
