= Loving, New Mexico =

- Village
- Location of Loving, New Mexico

- Location in the United States
- Coordinates: 32°17′10″N 104°05′51″W
- Country: United States
- State: New Mexico
- County: Eddy
- Named for: Oliver Loving

Area
  - Total: 1.21 sq mi (3.13 km^{2})
  - Land: 1.20 sq mi (3.12 km^{2})
  - Water: 0 sq mi (0.00 km^{2})
- Elevation: 3,051 ft (930 m)

Population (2020)
  - Total: 1,390
  - Density: 1,152.3/sq mi (444.91/km^{2})
- Time zone: UTC-7 (Mountain (MST))
  - Summer (DST): UTC-6 (MDT)
- ZIP code: 88256
- Area code: 575
- FIPS code: 35-44420
- GNIS feature ID: 2413569
- Website: www.lovingnm.gov

Loving is a village in Eddy County, New Mexico. As of the 2020 census, Loving had a population of 1,390. Loving was settled by Swiss immigrants in the 1890s.

== Geography ==
Loving is located in southeastern Eddy County. U.S. Route 285 passes through the west side of the village, leading northwest 12 miles (19 km) to Carlsbad, the county seat, and southeast 74 miles (119 km) to Pecos, Texas. The Pecos River flows southwards 4 miles (6 km) east of Loving.

According to the United States Census Bureau, the village has a total area of 1.2 square miles (3.0 km^{2}), all land.

== Demographics ==
Historical population
| Census | Pop. | Note | %± |
|---|---|---|---|
| 1950 | 1,487 | | — |
| 1960 | 1,646 | | 10.7% |
| 1970 | 1,192 | | −27.6% |
| 1980 | 1,355 | | 13.7% |
| 1990 | 1,243 | | −8.3% |
| 2000 | 1,326 | | 6.7% |
| 2010 | 1,413 | | 6.6% |
| 2020 | 1,390 | | −1.6% |
U.S. Decennial Census

As of the census of 2000, there were 1,326 people, 441 households, and 339 families residing in the village. The population density was 1,168.7 inhabitants per square mile (451.2/km^{2}). There were 516 housing units at an average density of 454.8 units per square mile (175.6 units/km^{2}). The racial makeup of the village was 57.69% White, 0.30% African American, 1.58% Native American, 36.88% from other races, and 3.54% from two or more races. Hispanic or Latino of any race were 78.28% of the population.

There were 441 households, out of which 43.1% had children under the age of 18 living with them, 58.5% were married couples living together, 12.0% had a female householder with no husband present, and 23.1% were non-families. 21.5% of all households were made up of individuals, and 10.0% had someone living alone who was 65 years of age or older. The average household size was 3.01 and the average family size was 3.49.

In the village, the population was spread out, with 34.6% under the age of 18, 8.1% from 18 to 24, 26.1% from 25 to 44, 19.3% from 45 to 64, and 11.8% who were 65 years of age or older. The median age was 31 years. For every 100 females, there were 101.2 males. For every 100 females age 18 and over, there were 105.0 males.

The median income for a household in the village was $22,414, and the median income for a family was $25,132. Males had a median income of $25,000 versus $16,250 for females. The per capita income for the village was $10,715. About 23.5% of families and 24.0% of the population were below the poverty line, including 26.5% of those under age 18 and 25.5% of those age 65 or over.

== Education ==
It is within Loving Municipal Schools. Loving High School was built in the late-1980s. It has an active athletic program, especially in softball where it has won 19 state titles. Other state titles include three for football, one for basketball, four for baseball, and three for track.

== Notable people ==
- Al Montgomery, MLB catcher
- Alejandro R. Ruiz, soldier in the United States Army
