= New Mexico State Road 524 =

State highway in New Mexico, United States

State Road 524

Route information
- Maintained by NMDOT
- Length: 8.500 mi (13.679 km)

Major junctions
- South end: US 62 / US 180 / US 285 near Carlsbad
- North end: US 285 in Carlsbad

Location
- Country: United States
- State: New Mexico
- Counties: Eddy

Highway system
- New Mexico State Highway System; Interstate; US; State; Scenic
← NM 523	→ NM 525

State Road 524 (NM 524) is a 8.5-mile-long (13.7 km) state highway in the US state of New Mexico. NM 524's southern terminus is at US 62, US 180 and US 285 in Carlsbad, and the northern terminus is at U.S. Route 285 (US 285) northwest of Carlsbad.

== Major intersections ==
The entire route is in Eddy County.

Location	mi	km	Destinations	Notes
	0.000	0.000	US 285	Northern terminus
Carlsbad	8.500	13.679	US 62 / US 180 / US 285	Southern terminus
1.000 mi = 1.609 km; 1.000 km = 0.621 mi
