= Bob Kelly (American football, born 1938) =

American football player (1938–2014)

No. 73, 72, 70, 77
- Positions: Defensive tackle, offensive tackle

Personal information
- Born: August 18, 1938; Carlsbad, New Mexico, U.S.
- Died: December 18, 2014 (aged 76); Cincinnati, Ohio, U.S.
- Listed height: 6 ft 2 in (1.88 m)
- Listed weight: 270 lb (122 kg)

Career information
- High school: Carlsbad (NM)
- College: New Mexico State
- AFL draft: 1961: 22nd round, 175th overall pick

Career history
- Houston Oilers (1961–1964); Kansas City Chiefs (1967); Cincinnati Bengals (1968)

Awards and highlights
- AFL champion (1961)

Career statistics
- Games played: 39
- Stats at Pro Football Reference

Bob Lee Kelly (August 18, 1938 – December 18, 2014) was an American football offensive lineman and defensive lineman in the American Football League (AFL) for the Houston Oilers, the Kansas City Chiefs and the Cincinnati Bengals.

Kelly played college football at New Mexico State University. After his Professional Football career, he coached the Hughes High School football team in Cincinnati for 27 years.

== See also ==
- Other American Football League players
