= Frank Giddens =

American football player (1959–2004)

No. 79, 76
- Position: Offensive tackle

Personal information
- Born: January 20, 1959; Lubbock, Texas, U.S.
- Died: July 15, 2004 (aged 45); Lubbock, Texas, U.S.
- Listed height: 6 ft 7 in (2.01 m)
- Listed weight: 300 lb (136 kg)

Career information
- High school: Carlsbad (NM)
- College: New Mexico
- NFL draft: 1981: undrafted

Career history
- Philadelphia Eagles (1981–1982); Arizona Wranglers (1984)

Career NFL statistics
- Games played: 25
- Games started: 2
- Stats at Pro Football Reference

Frank Giddens (January 20, 1959 – July 15, 2004) was an American professional football tackle. He played for the Philadelphia Eagles from 1981 to 1982.
