= Channel 23 TV stations in Mexico =

The following television stations broadcast on digital channel 23 in Mexico:

- XEIMT-TDT in Mexico City
- XETV-TDT in Tijuana, Baja California
- XHAA-TDT in Tapachula, Chiapas
- XHAFC-TDT in San Nicolás Jacala, Hidalgo
- XHAL-TDT in Acapulco, Guerrero
- XHAUM-TDT in Autlán de Navarro, Jalisco
- XHBT-TDT in Culiacán, Sinaloa
- XHBX-TDT in Chetumal, Quintana Roo
- XHBY-TDT in Ciudad Mante, Tamaulipas
- XHCMZ-TDT in Comitán de Domínguez, Chiapas
- XHCOZ-TDT in Cozumel, Quintana Roo
- XHCPBC-TDT in La Paz, Baja California Sur
- XHCPO-TDT in Concepción Pápalo, Oaxaca
- XHCTCU-TDT in Cuernavaca, Morelos
- XHGSM-TDT in San Miguel de Allende, Guanajuato
- XHGTI-TDT in Tierra Blanca, Guanajuato
- XHHES-TDT in Hermosillo, Sonora
- XHIB-TDT in Taxco de Alarcón, Guerrero
- XHIDC-TDT in Isla de Cedros, Baja California
- XHIMN-TDT in Islas Marías, Nayarit
- XHIT-TDT in Chihuahua, Chihuahua
- XHJP-TDT in Puerto Escondido, Oaxaca
- XHKYU-TDT in Valladolid, Yucatán
- XHL-TDT in León, Guanajuato
- XHLNA-TDT in Nuevo Laredo, Tamaulipas
- XHMIO-TDT in Miahuatlán de Porfirio Díaz, Oaxaca
- XHMZ-TDT in Mazatlán, Sinaloa
- XHNOZ-TDT in Nochistlán, Zacatecas
- XHOAH-TDT in Torreón, Coahuila
- XHPBGD-TDT in Guadalajara, Jalisco
- XHPVJ-TDT in Puerto Vallarta, Jalisco
- XHRAM-TDT in Zamora, Michoacán
- XHRDC-TDT in Nueva Rosita, Coahuila
- XHS-TDT in Ensenada, Baja California
- XHSMI-TDT in Santa María Ixcatlan, Oaxaca
- XHSMZ-TDT in Sombrerete, Zacatecas
- XHSPRME-TDT in Mérida, Yucatán
- XHSPS-TDT in San Luis Potosí, San Luis Potosí
- XHTEC-TDT in Armería, Colima
- XHTLX-TDT in Tlaxcala, Tlaxcala
- XHTOH-TDT in Tepeapulco, Hidalgo
- XHTXM-TDT in Huamantla, Tlaxcala
- XHVIH-TDT in Villahermosa, Tabasco
- XHX-TDT in Monterrey, Nuevo León
