= Carlsbad Municipal School District =

School district in Carlsbad, New Mexico, United States

Location
- Carlsbad, New Mexico United States

District information
- Type: Public
- Superintendent: Dr. Gerry Washburn
- Schools: 14

Students and staff
- Students: 6,800

Other information
- Website: Carlsbad Municipal School District

Carlsbad Municipal School District, also known as Carlsbad Municipal Schools, is a school district in Carlsbad, New Mexico, United States.

== Governance ==
The CMS superintendent is Dr. Gerry Washburn.

The Board of Education is made up of:

- David Shoup, President
- Andrew Harris, Vice President
- Simon Rubio, Secretary
- Abel Montoya
- Ron Singleton

== Service area ==
In addition to Carlsbad, the district includes: Happy Valley, La Huerta, Livingston Wheeler, Malaga, and Whites City.

== Schools ==
=== Pre-elementary schools ===
- Hillcrest
- Early Childhood Education Center

=== Elementary schools ===
- Cottonwood Elementary School
- Monterrey Elementary School
  - It was remodeled in 2022.
- Desert Willow Elementary School
- Ocotillo Elementary School
- Sunset Elementary School

=== Middle schools ===
- Carlsbad Sixth Grade Academy
- Carlsbad Intermediate School

=== High schools ===
- Carlsbad High School
- Carlsbad Early College High School

=== Charter schools ===
- Jefferson Montessori Academy
- Pecos Connections Academy

== See also ==
- Education in New Mexico
