= Carlsbad High School (New Mexico) =

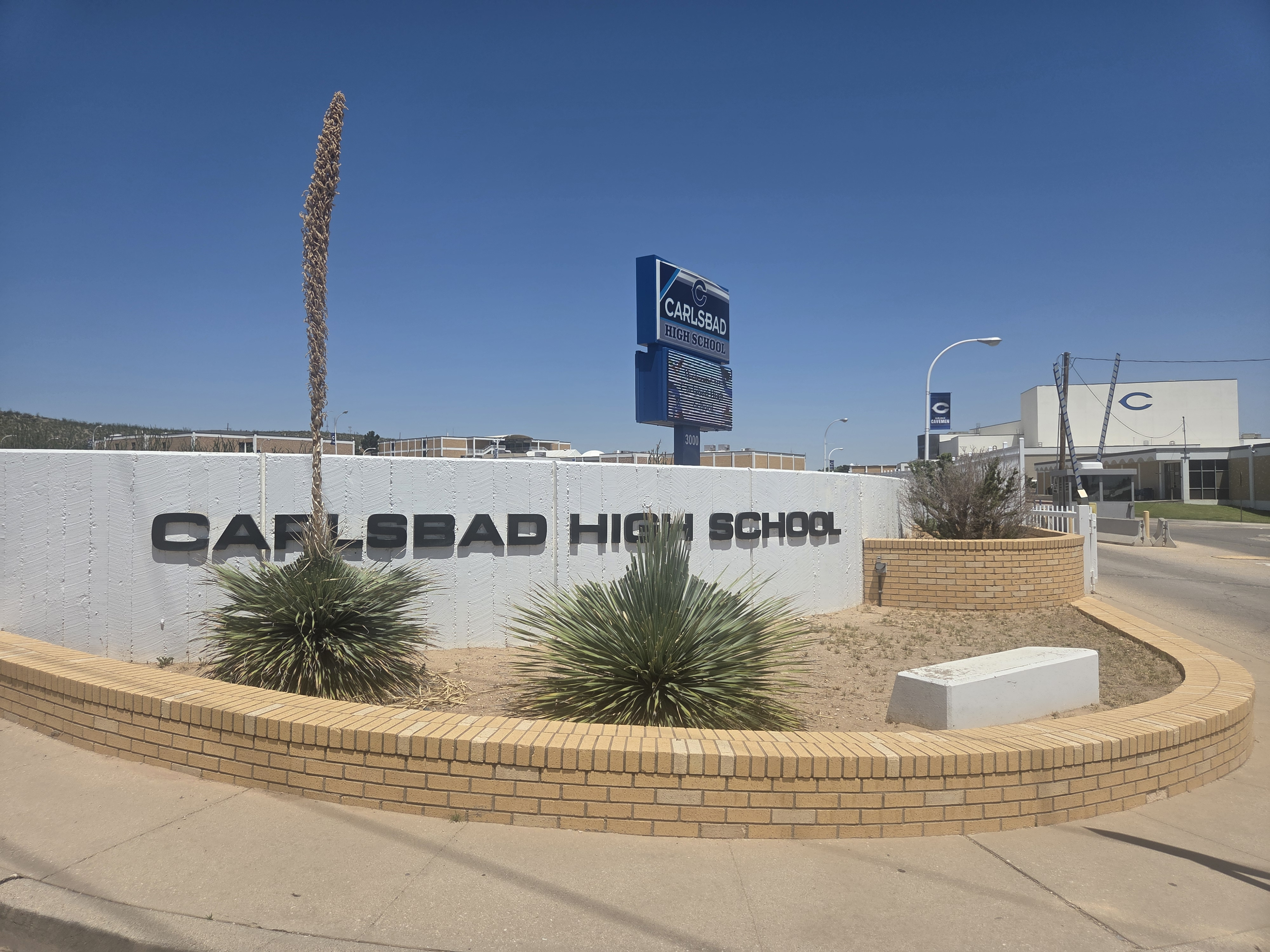
- A sign and campus entrance at Carlsbad High School in Carlsbad, New Mexico.

Location
- 3000 W. Church Street; Carlsbad, New Mexico 88220; United States; 32.4303°N 104.2648°W

Information
- Type: Public high school
- Established: 1908
- School district: Carlsbad Municipal School District
- Principal: Roy de la Garza, M.Ed.
- Staff: 80.07 (FTE)
- Grades: 9–12
- Enrollment: 1,623 (2023–2024)
- Student to teacher ratio: 20.27
- Campus: Rural (suburban)
- Colors: Blue, silver, and white
- Athletics conference: NMAA, 6A Dist. 4
- Mascot: Rusty, the Caveman
- Nickname: Cavemen (Cavegirls)
- Rivals: Artesia High School (Eddy County War), Hobbs Eagles
- Newspaper: The Caveman Chronicle
- Yearbook: The Echo Yearbook
- Website: www.carlsbadschools.net/chs

Carlsbad High School (CHS) is located in Carlsbad, New Mexico, United States, and has a student population of over 1,600 students. It is a part of the Carlsbad Municipal School District.

In addition to Carlsbad, the Carlsbad district, of which Carlsbad High is the only comprehensive high school, includes: Happy Valley, La Huerta, Livingston Wheeler, Malaga, and Whites City. The school also serves the nearby communities of Queen and Otis.

CHS received a "C" grade from the New Mexico Public Education Department in 2016.

== Campus ==
The Carlsbad High School Campus was opened in 1962, with the conversion of the previous high school into what is present-day Carlsbad Intermediate School. Carlsbad High School consists of nine buildings scattered across a large campus. The Main Building is a three-story building with an interior atrium opening to the northeast. Also on campus are the Freshman Academy (where classes for most freshmen are held), the Science Building, the PAD (housing the History and Math departments), the cafeteria (also housing the theatre department), the Gym Complex (including a public-access natatorium), the Performing Arts Center (containing the band, choir, dance, and cheerleading programs), the Arts and Crafts building, and the Building Trades Center. CHS is the largest high school campus in the state of New Mexico, and one of the largest in the country.

== Athletics ==
CHS competes in the New Mexico Activities Association (NMAA), as a class 6A school in District 3. In 2013, the NMAA realigned the state's schools in to six classifications and adjusted district boundaries. Carlsbad High School has a total of 68 state titles, which puts it in fourth place for most state titles across all sports divisions in New Mexico.

CHS competes in a wide variety of sports as the Cavemen and Cavegirls:

- Tennis – Cavemen and Cavegirl tennis both compete. New tennis courts were opened in the 2009–10 academic school year. The Cavegirls were district and state champions five years in a row, beginning in 2006. The Cavemen won the state championship in tennis in 2012.
- Volleyball – Cavegirl volleyball won the 2010 district championship.
- Football – The Cavemen football team has a total of eight state championships, but their most recent one was in 1962. The team plays at Ralph Bowyer Cavemen Stadium (named after a former Cavemen football player and later coach in 1962) on campus, which has a capacity of nearly 7000 people. The team wears silver helmets with a single blue stripe and a blue wishbone "C"; the jerseys and pants are both solid blue. The away jerseys and pants are white.

Throughout the 1980s into 2005, in addition to the traditional blue home uniforms with silver helmets, the team wore silver visiting jerseys and pants. During their 2010 season, the Cavemen went 7–3 in the regular season, and won the District 4 AAAAA title by defeating the Clovis Wildcats 14-13. The Cavemen then defeated the West Mesa High School Mustangs 35–19 in their first home playoff game since 2002. However, the Cavemen fell next week to the Manzano High School Monarchs 39–29. This season marked a major turnaround for head coach Ron Arrington. In 2011, the Cavemen finished the regular season 8–2, as well as defeating the Artesia Bulldogs and the Mayfield Trojans, the latter of whom Carlsbad had not defeated since 1992.

Ralph Bowyer Cavemen Stadium on a Friday night vs. the Canutillo Eagles

- Basketball – The Cavemen basketball team has three state championships, the most recent of which occurred in 1955. In 2016, however, they were state runner-ups.
- Baseball and softball – The Carlsbad High School baseball and softball teams have many state championships each. The Cavemen play at the Caveman Corral and the Cavegirls at Cavegirl Park. The Cavemen and Cavegirls both won the district championship in 2010, and the Cavegirls won the state championship over Rio Rancho High School 7–6. The Cavemen claimed the 2012 baseball title over Sandia High School, their first title since 2002. In 2016, The Cavemen also claimed the 2016 State Championship title against Rio Rancho.
- Men's and women's soccer – The Cavemen and Cavegirl soccer teams both play their varsity soccer games at Ralph Bowyer Cavemen Stadium.
- Swimming and Diving – The Carlsbad High School swim team have been around for many years. An additional dive team was created in the 2009–10 academic year.
- Wrestling – The Cavemen wrestlers have been frequent participants in the state championships, winning nine state championships (the most state championships of any Cavemen sport). In addition to multiple one, two, three, and four time individual state champions, the Cavemen also boast the first five-time individual state champion; there have only been two in New Mexico history.

== Notable alumni ==
- Shane Andrews, former MLB player (Montreal Expos, Chicago Cubs, Boston Red Sox)
- Terry Cox, former MLB player (California Angels)
- Paxton Crawford, former MLB player (Boston Red Sox)
- Paul Gibson, former NFL wide receiver
- Frank Giddens, former NFL tackle
- Masaki Hemmi, soccer player and coach
- Mark Jackson, former CFL football player
- Bob Kelly, former NFL football player
- Joe Kelly, former CFL football player
- Georgia Lee Lusk, member of the United States House of Representatives
- Fred K. Mahaffey, United States Army four-star general
- Cody Ross, former MLB player (Detroit Tigers, Los Angeles Dodgers, Cincinnati Reds, Florida Marlins, San Francisco Giants, Boston Red Sox, and the Arizona Diamondbacks)
- Dave Sherer, former NFL football player
- Trevor Rogers, first round pick in the 2017 MLB Draft by the Miami Marlins
- Robert Wertheim, rear admiral
- Linda Wertheimer, American radio journalist for National Public Radio
- John Wooten, former NFL football player

== See also ==
- Carlsbad Municipal School District
