= Eddy County, New Mexico =

County in New Mexico, United States

- County
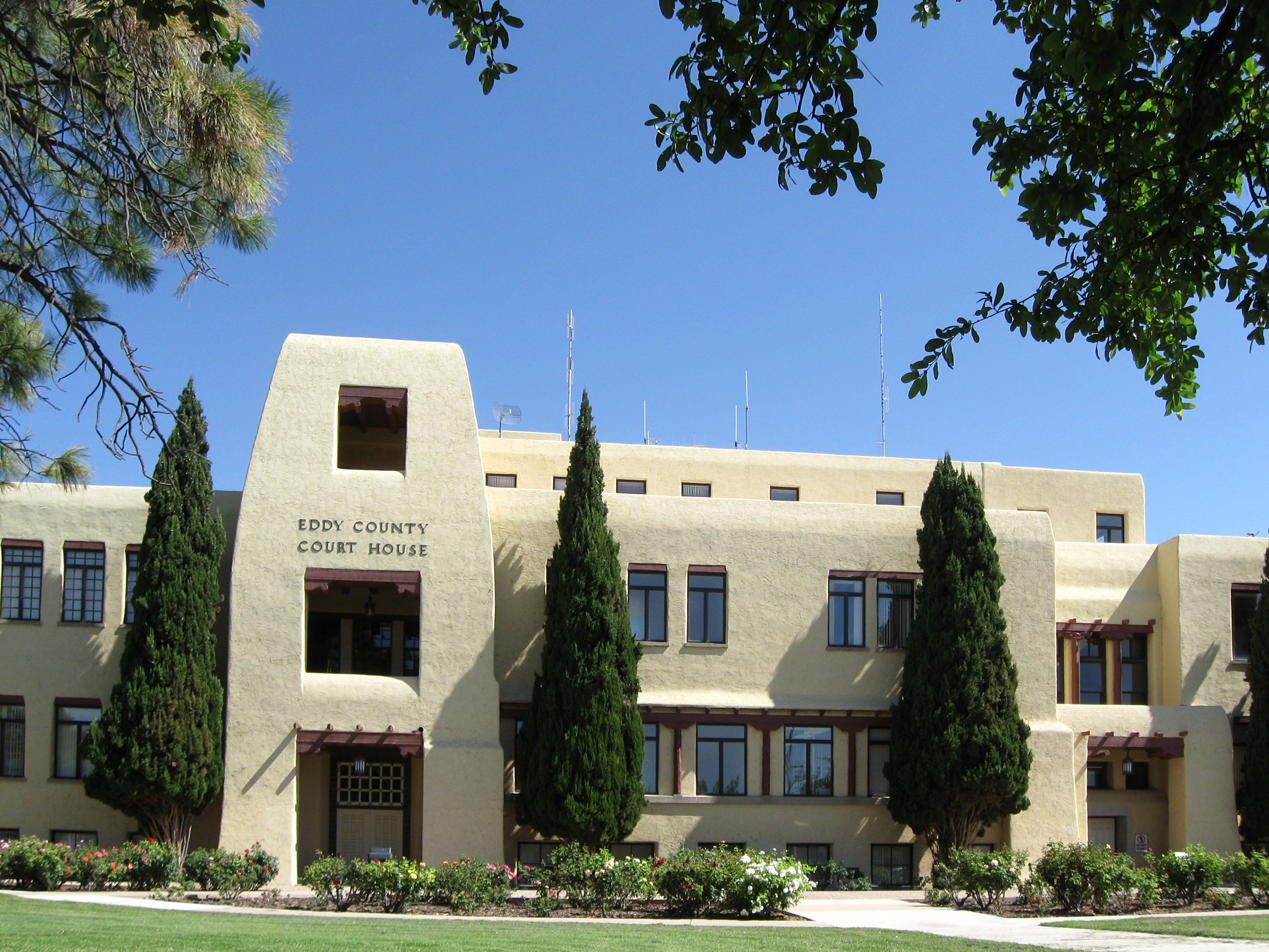
- Eddy County Courthouse in Carlsbad

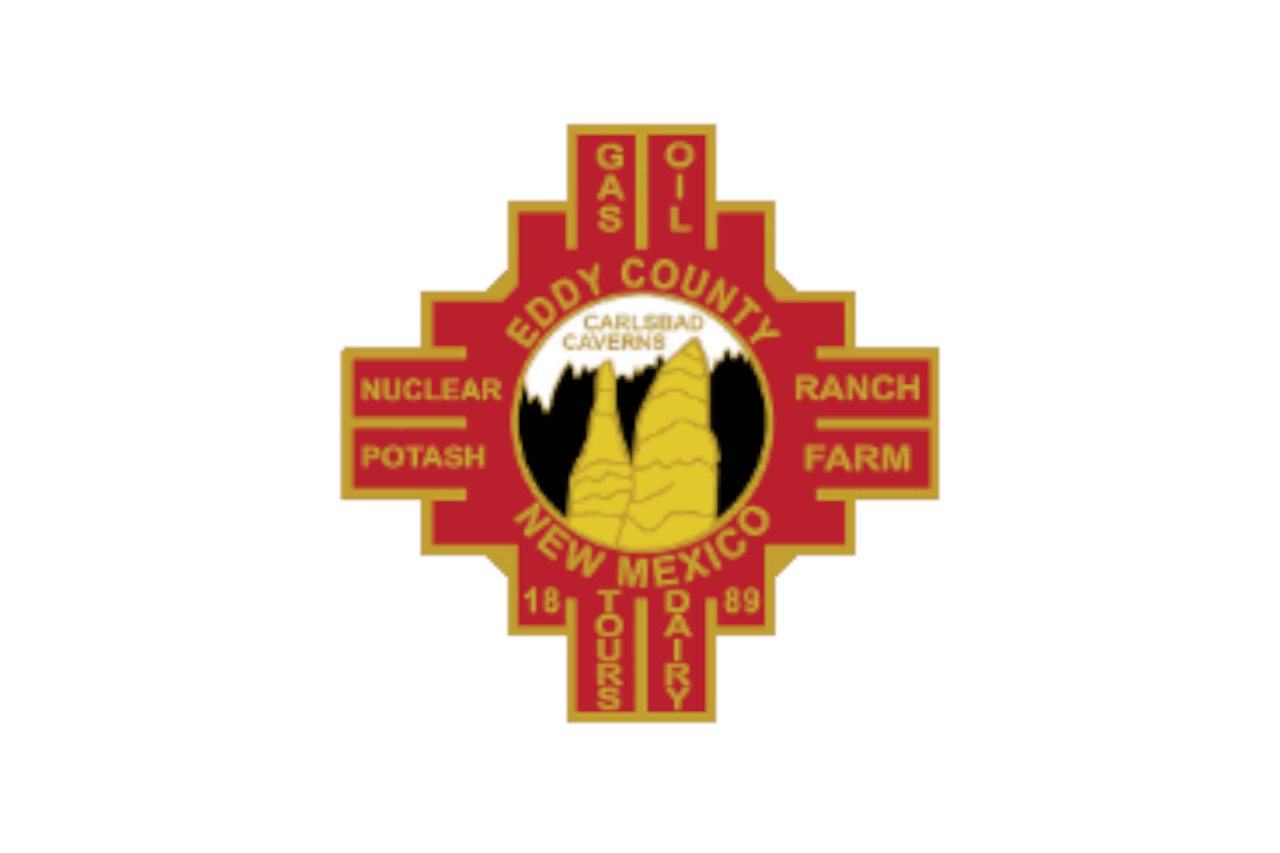
- Flag

- Location within the U.S. state of New Mexico
- Coordinates: 32°28′N 104°18′W
- Country: United States
- State: New Mexico
- Founded: May 16, 1891
- Named for: Charles Eddy, a local rancher
- Seat: Carlsbad
- Largest city: Carlsbad

Area
  - Total: 4,198 sq mi (10,870 km^{2})
  - Land: 4,176 sq mi (10,820 km^{2})
  - Water: 22 sq mi (57 km^{2}) 0.5%

Population (2020)
  - Total: 62,314
  - Estimate (2025): 62,509 ▲
  - Density: 14.92/sq mi (5.761/km^{2})
- Time zone: UTC−7 (Mountain)
  - Summer (DST): UTC−6 (MDT)
- Congressional districts: 2nd, 3rd
- Website: www.eddycountynm.gov

Eddy County is a county located in the U.S. state of New Mexico. As of the 2020 census, the population was 62,314. Its county seat and largest city is Carlsbad. The county was created in 1891 and later organized in 1892. It is north of the Texas state line.

Eddy County comprises the Carlsbad-Artesia, NM Micropolitan Statistical Area.

Carlsbad Caverns National Park is located in this county. Eddy County is the location of the Waste Isolation Pilot Plant.

== History ==
In 1866, Charles Goodnight and Oliver Loving drove vast herds of cattle along the Pecos and set up "cow camps" in Seven Rivers and what is now Carlsbad. John Chisum soon joined them and brought an estimated 100,000 head of cattle of his own through the Pecos Valley.

In 1881, Charles B. Eddy came to the area, and with his brother, John, and partner Amos Bissell, developed the Eddy-Bissell Cattle Company. In 1884, the Eddy brothers and Bissell broke ground on the Halagueno Ranch, which encompassed an area from Seven Rivers to La Huerta (a suburb of Carlsbad). In 1887, Eddy built the Halagueno diversion ditch on the Pecos, three miles above the site of the Avalon Dam (which was completed in 1890) and incorporated the venture, calling it the Pecos Valley Land and Ditch Company. Eddy was looking to entice Europeans to settle the area, and with the new Halagueno Ranch and the Pecos Valley Land and Ditch Company established, he sought funds from a Swiss bank to help attract them to the clean air and sunny climate.

In 1888, Patrick Garrett (known as the sheriff who had shot Billy the Kid) along with promoter Charles Greene, joined forces with Eddy to design and build a system of canals and flumes to divert water to their ranches and properties. Greene was able to procure investors from the east, one of which was Robert W. Tansill (manufacturer of the "Punch 5 ¢ Cigar"). These men, along with another big investor, J.J. Hagerman, laid the plans for a new town on the west bank of the Pecos River. The men had the town incorporated as Eddy on September 15, 1888.

The county was named for cattle rancher Charles B. Eddy. When the territorial legislature set the boundaries of Eddy County in 1889, Seven Rivers was named the county seat. During an election in 1890 for new county commissioners, a referendum was on the ballot to change the seat from Seven Rivers to the town of Eddy. The referendum passed by a vote of 331 to 83. In that year, the census said Eddy had only 278 people and they cast 241 of the winning votes. The referendum also included the building of a courthouse. Charles Eddy donated the land, which consisted of an entire town block. The county commissioners authorized a contract for $30,000 to build a brick courthouse. (In 1899, the town of Eddy changed its name to Carlsbad.)

On January 10, 1891, the first railroad train on the new Pecos Valley Railroad arrived in Eddy from Pecos, Texas. Crops of cotton and alfalfa (which were found to be the perfect crops for the Eddy County area), along with cattle, sheep, wool, and people, could be moved into and out of the area with ease, now. This brought more investors and many more settlers into the area.

In 1902, Carlsbad Caverns were discovered about 18 mi (29 km) southwest of Carlsbad town. The discovery is still disputed between Jim White and Abijah Long. The caves are now known as Carlsbad Caverns National Park. The caverns have brought many millions of visitors from around the world to Eddy County.

Oil was discovered in Eddy County in 1909, near the town of Dayton (8 mi south of Artesia). Another big oil strike happened in 1923, when Martin Yates Jr. purchased a well near Artesia, and southeastern New Mexico was said to be "gushing oil!" Drilling commenced at a furious pace and by 1938, the area's oil production was valued at $32 million annually.

In 1925, a geologist, Dr. V. H. McNutt, discovered major deposits of potash, while looking for oil east of Carlsbad. This ushered in a "boom" in potash mining, and several large potash producers set up business in the area.

== Geography ==
According to the U.S. Census Bureau, the county has a total area of 4,198 square miles (10,870 km^{2}), which is just about four times the size of the entire U.S. State of Rhode Island. Of that area, 4,176 square miles (10,820 km^{2}) is land and 22 square miles (57 km^{2}) (0.5%) is covered by water. The lowest point in the state of New Mexico is located on the Red Bluff Reservoir in Eddy County, where the impounded Pecos River flows out of New Mexico and into Texas.

=== Adjacent counties ===
- Otero County - west
- Chaves County - north
- Lea County - east
- Loving County, Texas - southeast
- Reeves County, Texas - south
- Culberson County, Texas - south

=== National protected areas ===
- Carlsbad Caverns National Park
- Lincoln National Forest (part)

== Demographics ==
Historical population
| Census | Pop. | Note | %± |
|---|---|---|---|
| 1900 | 3,229 | | — |
| 1910 | 12,420 | | 284.6% |
| 1920 | 9,116 | | −26.6% |
| 1930 | 15,842 | | 73.8% |
| 1940 | 24,311 | | 53.5% |
| 1950 | 40,640 | | 67.2% |
| 1960 | 50,783 | | 25.0% |
| 1970 | 41,119 | | −19.0% |
| 1980 | 47,855 | | 16.4% |
| 1990 | 48,605 | | 1.6% |
| 2000 | 51,658 | | 6.3% |
| 2010 | 53,829 | | 4.2% |
| 2020 | 62,314 | | 15.8% |
| 2025 (est.) | 62,509 | ▲ | 0.3% |
U.S. Decennial Census; 1790-1960 1900-1990; 1990-2000 2010

=== 2020 census ===
As of the 2020 census, the county had a population of 62,314. The median age was 35.5 years. 26.3% of residents were under the age of 18 and 14.2% of residents were 65 years of age or older. For every 100 females there were 103.1 males, and for every 100 females age 18 and over there were 103.2 males age 18 and over.

Eddy County, New Mexico – Racial and ethnic composition Note: the US Census treats Hispanic/Latino as an ethnic category. This table excludes Latinos from the racial categories and assigns them to a separate category. Hispanics/Latinos may be of any race.
| Race / Ethnicity (NH = Non-Hispanic) | Pop 2000 | Pop 2010 | Pop 2020 | % 2000 | % 2010 | % 2020 |
|---|---|---|---|---|---|---|
| White alone (NH) | 29,797 | 28,111 | 27,139 | 57.68% | 52.22% | 43.55% |
| Black or African American alone (NH) | 669 | 589 | 791 | 1.30% | 1.09% | 1.27% |
| Native American or Alaska Native alone (NH) | 382 | 439 | 518 | 0.74% | 0.82% | 0.83% |
| Asian alone (NH) | 204 | 325 | 578 | 0.39% | 0.60% | 0.93% |
| Pacific Islander alone (NH) | 20 | 16 | 43 | 0.04% | 0.03% | 0.07% |
| Other race alone (NH) | 36 | 63 | 404 | 0.07% | 0.12% | 0.65% |
| Mixed race or Multiracial (NH) | 527 | 555 | 1,534 | 1.02% | 1.03% | 2.46% |
| Hispanic or Latino (any race) | 20,023 | 23,731 | 31,307 | 38.76% | 44.09% | 50.24% |
| Total | 51,658 | 53,829 | 62,314 | 100.00% | 100.00% | 100.00% |

The racial makeup of the county was 58.2% White, 1.6% Black or African American, 1.5% American Indian and Alaska Native, 1.0% Asian, 0.1% Native Hawaiian and Pacific Islander, 19.0% from some other race, and 18.7% from two or more races. Hispanic or Latino residents of any race comprised 50.2% of the population.

78.0% of residents lived in urban areas, while 22.0% lived in rural areas.

There were 22,751 households in the county, of which 35.8% had children under the age of 18 living with them and 23.5% had a female householder with no spouse or partner present. About 25.2% of all households were made up of individuals and 9.9% had someone living alone who was 65 years of age or older.

There were 26,277 housing units, of which 13.4% were vacant. Among occupied housing units, 69.1% were owner-occupied and 30.9% were renter-occupied. The homeowner vacancy rate was 2.0% and the rental vacancy rate was 14.8%.

=== 2000 ===
As of the 2000 census, 51,658 people, 19,379 households, and 14,069 families resided in the county. The population density was 12 people per square mile (4.6 people/km^{2}). The 22,249 housing units averaged 5 units per square mile (1.9/km^{2}). The racial makeup of the county was 76.34% White, 1.56% Black or African American, 1.25% Native American, 0.45% Asian, 0.09% Pacific Islander, 17.67% from other races, and 2.64% from two or more races. About 38.76% of the population were Hispanic or Latino of any race.

Of the 19,379 households, 35.60% had children under the age of 18 living with them, 56.10% were married couples living together, 11.90% had a female householder with no husband present, and 27.40% were not families. About 24.20% of all households were made up of individuals, and 10.70% had someone living alone who was 65 years of age or older. The average household size was 2.63 and the average family size was 3.12.

In the county, the population was distributed as 28.90% under the age of 18, 8.40% from 18 to 24, 25.70% from 25 to 44, 22.40% from 45 to 64, and 14.70% who were 65 years of age or older. The median age was 36 years. For every 100 females, there were 95.90 males. For every 100 females age 18 and over, there were 92.70 males.

The median income for a household in the county was $31,998, and for a family was $36,789. Males had a median income of $31,909 versus $19,686 for females. The per capita income for the county was $15,823. About 13.60% of families and 17.20% of the population were below the poverty line, including 21.50% of those under age 18 and 13.40% of those age 65 or over.

=== 2010 census ===
As of the 2010 census, there were 53,829 people, 20,411 households, and 14,292 families residing in the county. The population density was 12.9 inhabitants per square mile (5.0 inhabitants/km^{2}). There were 22,585 housing units at an average density of 5.4 units per square mile (2.1 units/km^{2}). The racial makeup of the county was 77.4% white, 1.5% American Indian, 1.4% black or African American, 0.7% Asian, 16.0% from other races, and 3.0% from two or more races. Those of Hispanic or Latino origin made up 44.1% of the population. In terms of ancestry, 10.8% were German, 8.8% were Irish, 8.5% were English, and 7.0% were American.

Of the 20,411 households, 35.7% had children under the age of 18 living with them, 50.3% were married couples living together, 13.0% had a female householder with no husband present, 30.0% were non-families, and 25.5% of all households were made up of individuals. The average household size was 2.59 and the average family size was 3.08. The median age was 37.3 years.

The median income for a household in the county was $46,583 and the median income for a family was $56,646. Males had a median income of $49,788 versus $30,158 for females. The per capita income for the county was $24,587. About 9.2% of families and 13.6% of the population were below the poverty line, including 16.7% of those under age 18 and 10.6% of those age 65 or over.

== Communities ==
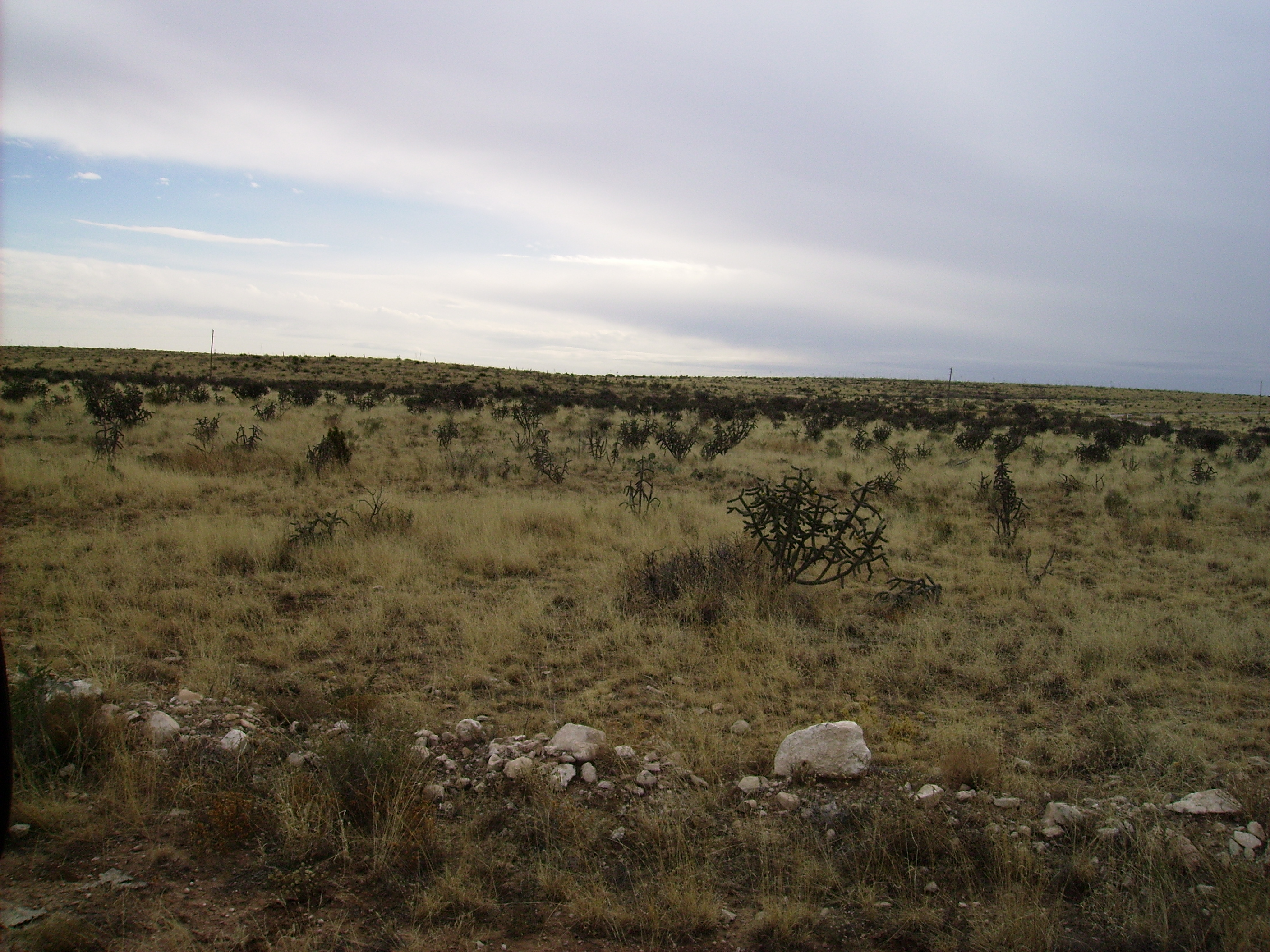
Countryside in Eddy County, 10 miles (16 km) west of Hope

=== Cities ===
- Artesia
- Carlsbad (county seat)

=== Villages ===
- Hope
- Loving

=== Census-designated places ===
- Atoka
- Happy Valley
- La Huerta
- Livingston Wheeler
- Loco Hills
- Malaga
- Morningside
- Whites City

=== Unincorporated communities ===
- Lakewood
- Queen
- Riverside

=== Ghost towns ===
- Avalon
- Barber Crossing
- Four Forks
- Four Wells
- Harkey Crossing
- Hunter Place
- Lookout
- Red Bluff
- Illinois Camp
- Three Forks

== Politics ==
For much of the first half of the 20th century, Eddy was a Democratic stronghold. Then it became a Republican-leaning swing county until the turn of the century. Since then, it has become a Republican stronghold, like most plains counties. Donald Trump's 2020 and 2024 performances here, both of over 75%, are the strongest victories for any Republican in county history.

United States presidential election results for Eddy County, New Mexico
| Year | Republican | | Democratic | | Third party(ies) | |
| Year | No. | % | No. | % | No. | % |
|---|---|---|---|---|---|---|
| 1912 | 145 | 8.96% | 936 | 57.85% | 537 | 33.19% |
| 1916 | 425 | 22.00% | 1,402 | 72.57% | 105 | 5.43% |
| 1920 | 982 | 37.42% | 1,611 | 61.39% | 31 | 1.18% |
| 1924 | 658 | 28.36% | 1,524 | 65.69% | 138 | 5.95% |
| 1928 | 1,618 | 57.11% | 1,212 | 42.78% | 3 | 0.11% |
| 1932 | 818 | 18.34% | 3,565 | 79.95% | 76 | 1.70% |
| 1936 | 1,027 | 18.93% | 4,349 | 80.17% | 49 | 0.90% |
| 1940 | 1,625 | 24.61% | 4,968 | 75.23% | 11 | 0.17% |
| 1944 | 2,083 | 28.43% | 5,228 | 71.35% | 16 | 0.22% |
| 1948 | 2,305 | 23.00% | 7,593 | 75.77% | 123 | 1.23% |
| 1952 | 6,041 | 44.45% | 7,495 | 55.15% | 55 | 0.40% |
| 1956 | 6,691 | 45.77% | 7,820 | 53.50% | 107 | 0.73% |
| 1960 | 7,986 | 47.59% | 8,707 | 51.89% | 87 | 0.52% |
| 1964 | 6,747 | 37.42% | 11,216 | 62.20% | 69 | 0.38% |
| 1968 | 7,193 | 47.74% | 6,093 | 40.44% | 1,780 | 11.81% |
| 1972 | 9,921 | 64.65% | 5,040 | 32.84% | 385 | 2.51% |
| 1976 | 7,698 | 45.59% | 9,073 | 53.73% | 115 | 0.68% |
| 1980 | 9,817 | 56.55% | 7,028 | 40.49% | 514 | 2.96% |
| 1984 | 11,810 | 60.99% | 7,364 | 38.03% | 191 | 0.99% |
| 1988 | 9,805 | 52.90% | 8,544 | 46.10% | 186 | 1.00% |
| 1992 | 7,313 | 40.18% | 7,409 | 40.70% | 3,480 | 19.12% |
| 1996 | 8,534 | 44.92% | 8,959 | 47.16% | 1,505 | 7.92% |
| 2000 | 10,335 | 58.10% | 7,108 | 39.96% | 344 | 1.93% |
| 2004 | 13,268 | 65.46% | 6,880 | 33.94% | 122 | 0.60% |
| 2008 | 12,500 | 62.21% | 7,351 | 36.58% | 242 | 1.20% |
| 2012 | 12,583 | 65.30% | 6,142 | 31.88% | 544 | 2.82% |
| 2016 | 13,147 | 66.85% | 5,033 | 25.59% | 1,487 | 7.56% |
| 2020 | 17,454 | 75.16% | 5,424 | 23.36% | 344 | 1.48% |
| 2024 | 18,141 | 77.29% | 5,032 | 21.44% | 299 | 1.27% |

== Education ==
School districts serving portions of the county include:

- Artesia Public Schools
- Carlsbad Municipal School District
- Loving Municipal Schools

== Transportation ==
=== Major highways ===
- US 62 / US 180
- US 82
- US 285
- NM 2
- NM 7
- NM 31
- NM 128
- NM 137
- NM 200
- NM 216
- NM 229
- NM 243
- NM 355
- NM 357
- NM 360
- NM 438
- NM 524
- NM 529

== See also ==
- National Register of Historic Places listings in Eddy County, New Mexico
