= Carlsbad, New Mexico =

- City
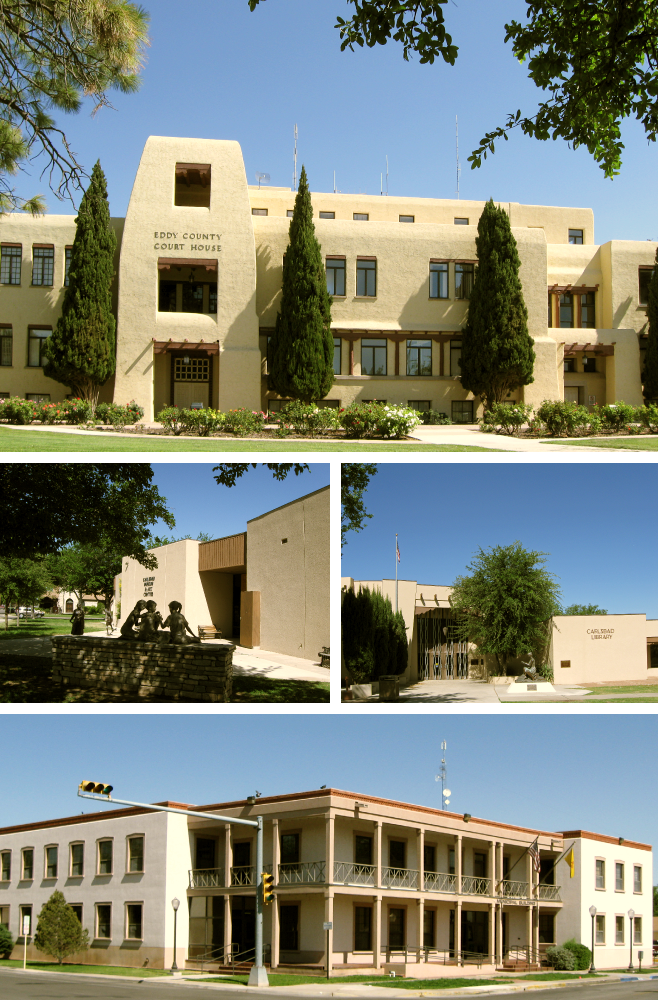
- Eddy County Courthouse; Carlsbad Museum and Art Center (l); Carlsbad Library (r); Carlsbad Municipal Building
- Nicknames: The Cavern City; The Pearl on the Pecos
- Location in the state of New Mexico

- Location in New Mexico Location in the United States
- Coordinates: 32°24′43″N 104°14′11″W
- Country: United States
- State: New Mexico
- County: Eddy
- Founded: 1888 (as Eddy)
- Incorporated: 1893 (as Eddy); 1899 (as Carlsbad)

Government
  - Type: Mayor-council government
  - Mayor: Rick Lopez
  - City Council: Councilors: Edward T. Rodriguez; Lisa A. Anaya-Flores; J.J. Chavez; Jeff Forrest; Karla Niemeier; Mary Garwood; Anthony Foreman; Mark Walterscheid
  - State House: Representatives: Cathrynn Brown (R); James G. Townsend (R)
  - State Senate: State Senators: Gay G. Kernan (R); Ron Griggs (R)
  - U.S. House: Representative: Gabe Vasquez (D)

Area
  - City: 31.79 sq mi (82.34 km^{2})
  - Land: 31.52 sq mi (81.63 km^{2})
  - Water: 0.28 sq mi (0.72 km^{2})
- Elevation: 3,127 ft (953 m)

Population (2020)
  - City: 32,238
  - Density: 1,022.9/sq mi (394.94/km^{2})
  - Urban: 31,499
- Demonym: Carlsbadian
- Time zone: UTC−07:00 (MST)
  - Summer (DST): UTC−06:00 (MDT)
- ZIP Codes: 88220-88221
- Area code: 575
- FIPS code: 35-12150
- GNIS feature ID: 2409985
- Primary airport: Cavern City Air Terminal; CNM
- Website: cityofcarlsbadnm.com

Carlsbad (/ˈkɑːrlzbæd/ KARLZ-bad) is a city in and the county seat of Eddy County, New Mexico, United States. As of the 2020 census, the city population was 32,238. Carlsbad is centered at the intersection of U.S. Routes 62/180 and 285, and is the principal city of the Carlsbad-Artesia Micropolitan Statistical Area, which has a total population of 62,314. Located in the southeastern part of New Mexico, Carlsbad straddles the Pecos River and sits at the eastern edge of the Guadalupe Mountains.

Carlsbad is a hub for potash mining, petroleum production, and tourism. Carlsbad Caverns National Park is located 20 miles (32 km) southwest of the city, and Guadalupe Mountains National Park lies 54 miles (87 km) southwest across the Texas border. The Lincoln National Forest is to the northwest of town.

== History ==
The development of southeastern New Mexico in the late 19th century was fueled by the arrival of colonies of immigrants from England, Switzerland, France, Italy; and emigrants from nearby Texas. Located along the banks of the Pecos River, Carlsbad was originally christened the town of Eddy on September 15, 1888, and organized as a municipal corporation in 1893; the settlement bore the name of Charles B. Eddy, co-owner of the Eddy-Bissell Livestock Company.

With the commercial development of local mineral springs near the flume for medicinal qualities, the town later voted to change its name to Carlsbad after the famous European spa Karlsbad, Bohemia (now Karlovy Vary, Czech Republic), which in turn was named after Charles IV, Holy Roman Emperor and King of Bohemia. On March 25, 1918, the growing town surpassed a population of 2,000, allowing then-governor of New Mexico Washington Ellsworth Lindsey to proclaim Carlsbad a city.

Most of Carlsbad's development was due to irrigation water. Local cattlemen recognized the value of diverting water from the Pecos River to the grazing lands on Eddy's Halagueno Ranch. Many construction projects were undertaken to establish an irrigation system within the town. The Avalon Dam was constructed upstream of town, and canals diverted the water into town. Conflict arose when the canals met the river downstream; as a result, the Pecos River Flume was built, first out of wood and later concrete (the flume is often titled the only place where a river crosses itself).

Key to the growth of the area was special excursion trains that brought visitors from the East at reduced fares. Before the Pecos Valley Railroad arrived in 1891, travel parties met at the railroad station in Toyah, Texas, and were driven by buggy 90 miles (140 km) over a rough, dusty road to this small but growing settlement on the banks of the Pecos River. Most of the early construction in Carlsbad was completed with locally manufactured bricks. The bricks were quite soft and of poor quality. The former First National Bank of Eddy building at the corner of Canal and Fox streets is one of the few remaining buildings constructed with local brick. The re-discovery of Carlsbad Caverns (then known as "Bat Cave") by local cowboys in 1901 and the subsequent establishment of Carlsbad Caverns National Park on May 14, 1930, gained the town of Carlsbad substantial recognition.

In 1925, potash was discovered near Carlsbad, and for many years Carlsbad dominated the American potash market. Following the decline of the potash market in the 1960s, the residents and leaders of Carlsbad lobbied for the establishment of the Waste Isolation Pilot Plant (WIPP), a site where low-level nuclear waste would be stored thousands of feet underground in salt beds. Congress authorized the WIPP project in 1979, and construction began in 1980. The DOE Carlsbad Area Office opened in 1993, and the first waste shipment arrived in 1999.

Currently, Carlsbad has experienced a "boom". The city is leading in the production of oil and natural gases across the entire area, causing an increase in the employment rate. Due to this increase, families and individuals have begun to migrate to Carlsbad.

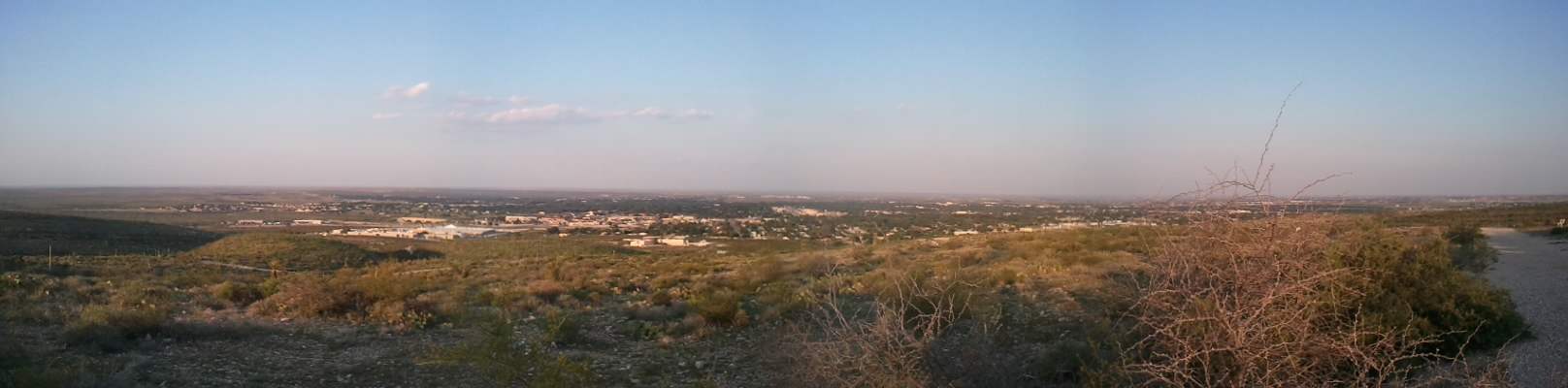
Photo of Carlsbad from the top of C-Hill

== Films based on or with the Carlsbad area as a location ==
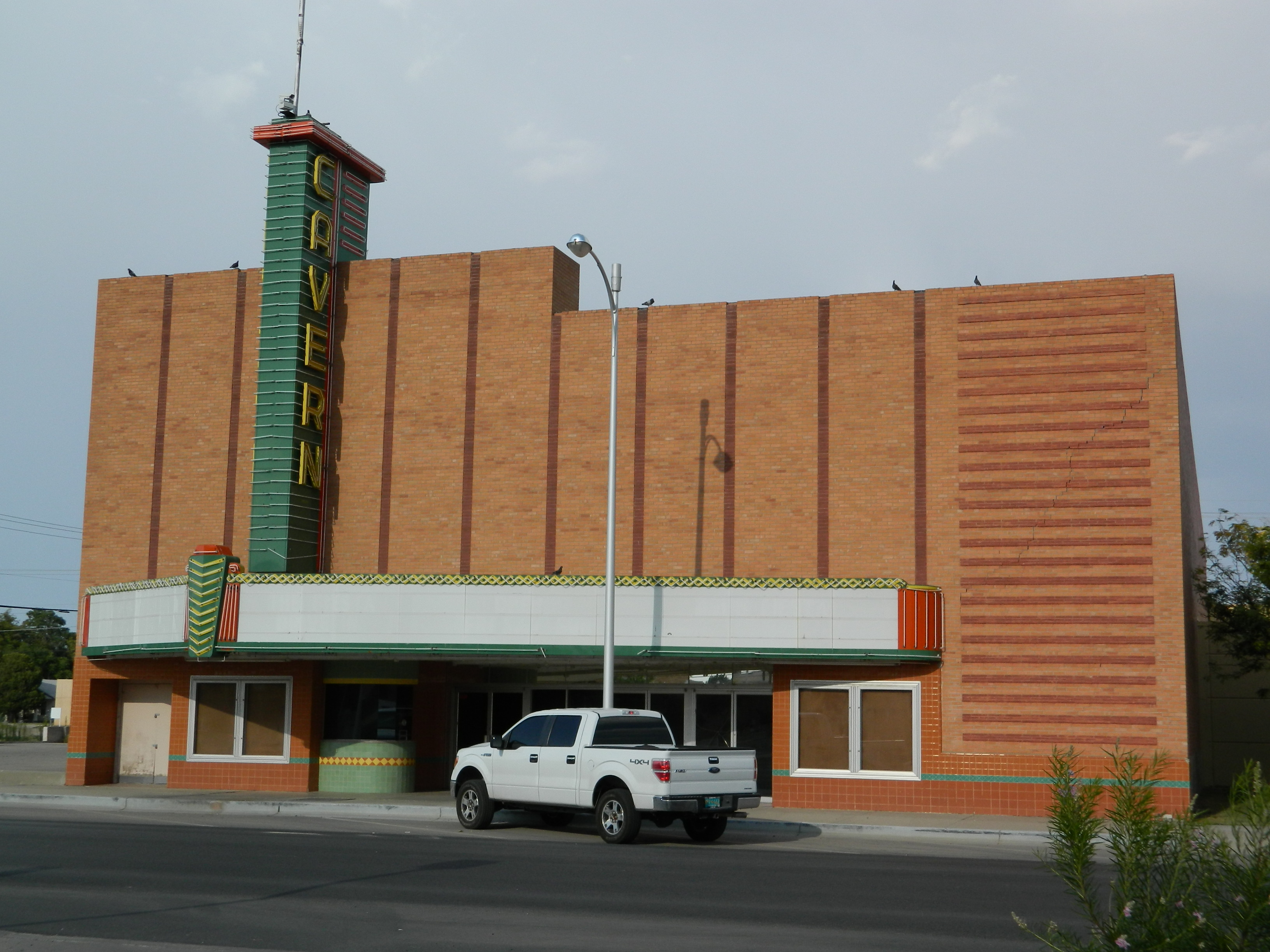
The Cavern Theater

=== Films made in the City of Carlsbad ===
The Honkers (1972)

Guitar Man (2015)

I'll Be There with You (2006)

Do It for Uncle Graham (2004)

À l'ouest du Pécos (1993)

=== Films based on the area or filmed in the area ===
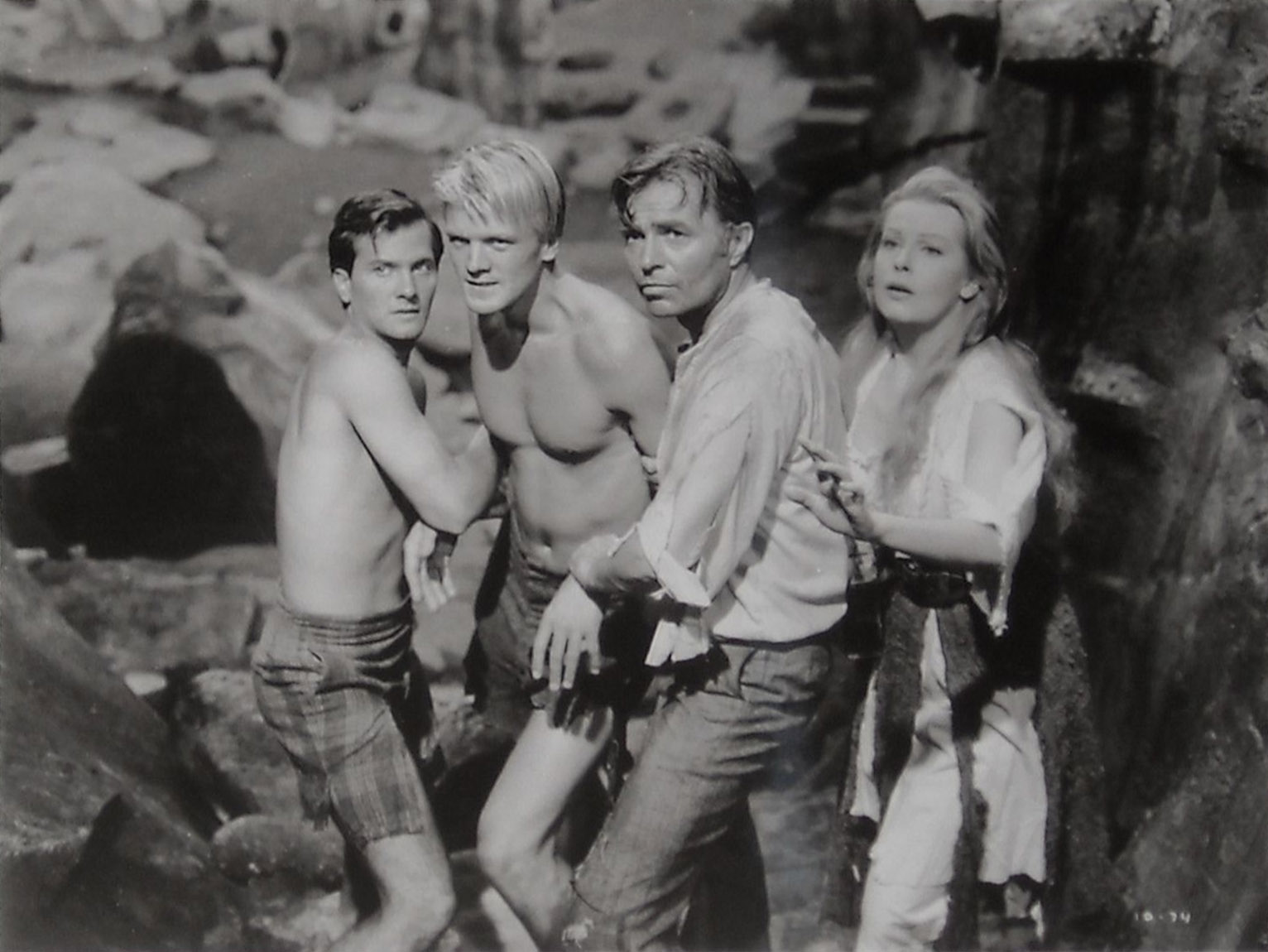
Journey to the Center of the Earth (1959) with Pat Boone, Peter Ronson, James Mason, and Arlene Dahl was filmed in the Carlsbad area, utilizing the Carlsbad Caverns as a filming location.

Gene Roddenberry (the creator of Star Trek) created and produced the made-for-television film Genesis II (1973), a science fiction film that starts with the main character having been in suspended animation in the Carlsbad Caverns at a point in the future.

The following films were filmed in the Carlsbad area, with Carlsbad Caverns National Park as the main location:

Journey to the Center of the Earth (1959). Starring James Mason and Pat Boone.

Jonathan Livingston Seagull (1973)

The Bat People (1974)

Earth vs. the Spider (1958)

King Solomon's Mines (1950)

== Geography and climate ==
Carlsbad is located near the center of Eddy County at 32°24′43″N 104°14′11″W (32.407577, -104.245167) at an elevation of 3,295 feet (1,004 m). Carlsbad is situated in the northern reaches of the Chihuahuan Desert ecoregion, in the lower Pecos River Valley. Via US 285 it is 36 miles (58 km) north to Artesia and 86 miles (138 km) south to Pecos, Texas. US Routes 62 and 180 lead northeast 69 miles (111 km) to Hobbs and southwest 169 miles (272 km) to El Paso.

According to the United States Census Bureau, Carlsbad has a total area of 29.2 square miles (75.6 km^{2}); 28.9 square miles (74.9 km^{2}) of the city is land, and 0.3 square miles (0.7 km^{2}), or 0.93%, is water. Most of the water within city limits consists of the Pecos River and Lake Carlsbad recreation area. The river flows into the northern part of Carlsbad, downstream from Lake Avalon and Brantley Lake, passes east of downtown, and exits in the southeast. Dark Canyon Draw also runs through the southern part of town, but only drains during heavy rainfall.

Carlsbad is part of the Interior West climate zone. It is classified as hot semi-arid (Köppen BSh), meaning average annual precipitation is less than potential evapotranspiration, but more than half. A moderate amount of rain falls each year, with the maximum occurring during July. Winters in Carlsbad are dry and mild, below freezing temperatures are a common occurrence at night. Springs are warm but can be occasionally hot. Summers are very hot which is very common for southern Plains of New Mexico and West Texas and average around 35 days per year of temperatures above 100 °F (38 °C) which can be unpleasant. Carlsbad is affected by the North American Monsoon during summer which can bring torrential downpours and flooding, which lowers daytime summer temperatures from the scorching great plains heat. Fall is generally warm and can be cold at times. Extreme temperatures ranges from −16 °F (−27 °C) on January 11, 1962, to 114 °F (46 °C) on June 28, 1994. 53 tornadoes have been reported in Eddy County since 1950.

Climate data for Carlsbad, New Mexico, 1991–2020 normals, extremes 1900–2021
Month	Jan	Feb	Mar	Apr	May	Jun	Jul	Aug	Sep	Oct	Nov	Dec	Year
Record high °F (°C)	88 (31)	100 (38)	100 (38)	101 (38)	110 (43)	114 (46)	112 (44)	111 (44)	106 (41)	101 (38)	97 (36)	86 (30)	114 (46)
Mean maximum °F (°C)	76.4 (24.7)	80.9 (27.2)	87.2 (30.7)	93.3 (34.1)	100.1 (37.8)	106.3 (41.3)	105.0 (40.6)	103.3 (39.6)	99.3 (37.4)	93.4 (34.1)	83.5 (28.6)	76.4 (24.7)	108.1 (42.3)
Mean daily maximum °F (°C)	58.7 (14.8)	64.0 (17.8)	71.8 (22.1)	80.1 (26.7)	88.0 (31.1)	96.6 (35.9)	96.5 (35.8)	95.3 (35.2)	88.4 (31.3)	79.7 (26.5)	67.8 (19.9)	58.6 (14.8)	78.8 (26.0)
Daily mean °F (°C)	44.3 (6.8)	49.0 (9.4)	56.3 (13.5)	64.2 (17.9)	72.9 (22.7)	81.8 (27.7)	83.6 (28.7)	82.3 (27.9)	75.3 (24.1)	65.0 (18.3)	53.0 (11.7)	44.7 (7.1)	64.4 (18.0)
Mean daily minimum °F (°C)	30.0 (−1.1)	34.0 (1.1)	40.7 (4.8)	48.3 (9.1)	57.9 (14.4)	67.0 (19.4)	70.7 (21.5)	69.4 (20.8)	62.3 (16.8)	50.2 (10.1)	38.2 (3.4)	30.7 (−0.7)	50.0 (10.0)
Mean minimum °F (°C)	17.3 (−8.2)	20.6 (−6.3)	25.8 (−3.4)	33.8 (1.0)	44.2 (6.8)	56.5 (13.6)	63.6 (17.6)	62.0 (16.7)	49.6 (9.8)	34.2 (1.2)	22.9 (−5.1)	16.6 (−8.6)	13.4 (−10.3)
Record low °F (°C)	−16 (−27)	−13 (−25)	8 (−13)	23 (−5)	31 (−1)	42 (6)	50 (10)	48 (9)	29 (−2)	21 (−6)	−1 (−18)	−4 (−20)	−16 (−27)
Average precipitation inches (mm)	0.56 (14)	0.45 (11)	0.54 (14)	0.45 (11)	0.99 (25)	1.07 (27)	2.03 (52)	1.63 (41)	1.49 (38)	1.01 (26)	0.66 (17)	0.67 (17)	11.55 (293)
Average snowfall inches (cm)	1.0 (2.5)	0.4 (1.0)	0.1 (0.25)	0.0 (0.0)	0.0 (0.0)	0.0 (0.0)	0.0 (0.0)	0.0 (0.0)	0.0 (0.0)	0.0 (0.0)	0.5 (1.3)	0.7 (1.8)	2.7 (6.85)
Average precipitation days (≥ 0.01 in)	3.0	2.6	2.7	1.9	3.5	4.6	5.6	5.7	5.7	4.2	3.1	3.2	45.8
Average snowy days (≥ 0.1 in)	0.3	0.3	0.0	0.0	0.0	0.0	0.0	0.0	0.0	0.0	0.1	0.4	1.1
Source 1: NOAA
Source 2: National Weather Service

== Demographics ==
Historical population
Census	Pop.	Note	%±
1900	963		—
1910	1,736		80.3%
1920	2,205		27.0%
1930	3,708		68.2%
1940	7,116		91.9%
1950	17,975		152.6%
1960	25,541		42.1%
1970	21,297		−16.6%
1980	25,496		19.7%
1990	24,952		−2.1%
2000	25,625		2.7%
2010	26,138		2.0%
2020	32,238		23.3%
U.S. Decennial Census

=== 2020 census ===
As of the 2020 census, Carlsbad had a population of 32,238. The median age was 34.7 years. 25.8% of residents were under the age of 18 and 14.0% of residents were 65 years of age or older. For every 100 females there were 102.8 males, and for every 100 females age 18 and over there were 103.0 males age 18 and over.

95.9% of residents lived in urban areas, while 4.1% lived in rural areas.

There were 11,803 households in Carlsbad, of which 35.5% had children under the age of 18 living in them. Of all households, 44.0% were married-couple households, 22.2% were households with a male householder and no spouse or partner present, and 25.0% were households with a female householder and no spouse or partner present. About 26.4% of all households were made up of individuals and 10.0% had someone living alone who was 65 years of age or older.

There were 13,836 housing units, of which 14.7% were vacant. The homeowner vacancy rate was 2.5% and the rental vacancy rate was 17.2%.

Racial composition as of the 2020 census
Race	Number	Percent
White	18,382	57.0%
Black or African American	730	2.3%
American Indian and Alaska Native	496	1.5%
Asian	437	1.4%
Native Hawaiian and Other Pacific Islander	40	0.1%
Some other race	6,377	19.8%
Two or more races	5,776	17.9%
Hispanic or Latino (of any race)	16,304	50.6%

=== 2010 census ===
As of the census of 2010, there were 26,138 people, 10,257 households, and 6,898 families residing in the city. The population density was 920.4/mi^{2} (353.2/km^{2}). There were 11,421 housing units at an average density of 402.6 per square mile (155.4/km^{2}).

The racial makeup of the city was:

- 74.7% White (53.1% non-Hispanic)
- 1.9% Black or African American
- 1.3% Native American
- 1.0% Asian
- <0.1% Pacific Islander
- 15.28% from other races
- 3.1% Multiracial (two or more races)
- 42.5% of the population were Hispanics or Latinos (of any race)

There were 10,257 households, out of which 29.2% had children under the age of 18 living with them, 46.0% were married couples living together, 14.0% had a female householder with no husband present, and 32.7% were non-families. 28.1% of all households were made up of individuals, and 11.4% had someone living alone who was 65 years of age or older. The average household size was 2.50 and the average family size was 3.03.

In the city, the population was spread out, with 25.6% under the age of 18, 9.0% from 18 to 24, 23.8% from 25 to 44, 26.1% from 45 to 64, and 15.6% who were 65 years of age or older. The median age was 39.4 years. For every 100 females, there were 96.5 males. For every 100 females age 18 and over, there were 93.6 males.

The median income for a household in the city was $30,658, and the median income for a family was $35,640. Males had a median income of $31,214 versus $19,228 for females. The per capita income for the city was $16,496. 16.5% of the population and 13.1% of families were below the poverty line. Out of the total population, 21.4% of those under the age of 18 and 11.2% of those 65 and older were living below the poverty line.

== Government ==
The city of Carlsbad has a mayor-council form of government. Voters elect both the mayor and the eight members of the city council (two for each ward), who pass laws and make policy. After the first meeting of the city council once newly elected council members are seated, the council elects a Mayor pro tempore who serves as mayor in absence of the elected mayor.

== Economy ==
Largest Employers in Carlsbad
1	Washington Tru Solutions LLC
2	Carlsbad Municipal Schools
3	Mosaic Potash Carlsbad
4	Constructors, Inc.
5	Carlsbad Medical Center
6	Intrepid Potash
7	Landsun Homes, Inc.
8	Lowe's
9	New Mexico State University-Carlsbad
10	Lakeview Christian Home

The economy of the Carlsbad area is based primarily on the mineral extraction sector; the city overlies the rich oil- and gas-producing formations of the Permian Basin and produces more potash than any other location in the United States. Carlsbad is home to the DOE's Carlsbad Field Office which operates the Waste Isolation Pilot Plant to safely store the transuranic nuclear wastes from the nation's defense sites. Tourism is a major factor with Carlsbad Caverns National Park, Guadalupe Mountains National Park, Lincoln National Forest, the Living Desert Zoo and Gardens State Park, and the annual Christmas on the Pecos Light Show all located within fifty miles of the city.

=== Mining ===
Potash is a potassium-containing compound used as a fertilizer, along with nitrogen and phosphorus. Potash deposits were found underground across the Permian Basin in 1925. Two companies, Mosaic Potash Carlsbad (formerly IMC Global) and Intrepid Potash (formerly Mississippi Chemical Corporation), operate mining operations east of Carlsbad. Both mines employ a significant number of workers from surrounding communities.

== Education ==
=== Public schools ===
Carlsbad Municipal School District is the operating public school system for Carlsbad. Besides the before mentioned schools, Carlsbad Municipal Schools also operates a charter school, Jefferson Montessori Academy. The mission of the Carlsbad Board of Education is to create a public school environment which meets the individual educational needs of all children regardless of their ability, ethnicity, creed, gender or social standing.

Elementary schools

- Cottonwood Elementary School
- Desert Willow Elementary School
- Early Childhood Education Center
- Edison Elementary School
- Hillcrest Preschool
- Joe Stanley Smith Elementary School (Closed 2021)
- Monterrey Elementary School
- Ocotillo Elementary School
- Sunset Elementary School
- Jefferson Montessori Academy

Secondary schools

- Carlsbad Early College High School
- Carlsbad High School
- Carlsbad Intermediate School
- Carlsbad Sixth Grade Academy
- Carlsbad Schools Athletics
- Carlsbad Schools Library
- Jefferson Montessori Academy

Private schools

- Faith Christian Academy
- St. Edwards Catholic School

Colleges and universities

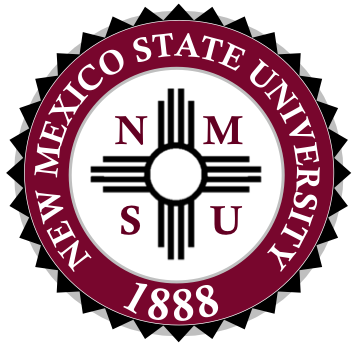
New Mexico State University (NMSU) seal

New Mexico State University has a branch campus located in Carlsbad, offering certificate, associate degree, bachelor's degree, and continuing education programs. NMSUC has a student population of approximately 2,000 and a staff of 104 faculty. Previously known as the Carlsbad Instructional Center, the campus was established in 1950 as the state's first community college. It was renamed a branch of NMSU in 1960. The present-day main building was built in 1980; an additional instruction center was added in 1987 and the computer facilities wing was completed in 1996. By 2011, the campus had added an additional building to house its nursing program, the Allied Health and University Transfer Center.

Eddy County Beauty College is also located in Carlsbad, providing certification programs for beauticians.

== Media and journalism ==
=== Print ===
Carlsbad is serviced by a daily (except Monday) newspaper, the Carlsbad Current-Argus.

Focus on Carlsbad is a quarterly magazine published with local articles related to living, shopping, and vacationing in Carlsbad.

=== Television ===
Channel 23 is a local television station shown on cable television. The channel airs coverage of special events and also local news; many residents host shows on topics from plant care to science. Classic films including 20,000 Leagues Under the Sea, Meet John Doe, and Scarlet Street are shown on Wednesdays. Channel23TV is unavailable on satellite television.

== Sports ==
The Carlsbad Bats professional baseball team were a member of the independent Pecos League. The Bats were primarily a travel team in the league, but played two games in Carlsbad in 2011. Carlsbad was considered, but turned down, for a full-time franchise in 2012. Carlsbad recently constructed a youth sports complex on the southwest side of town, containing six softball and four soccer fields. Multiple local and regional tournaments are held at the complex yearly.

Carlsbad High School is a AAAAA school in the Fourth District of the New Mexico Activities Association. Carlsbad High School has teams competing in the sports of football, baseball, softball, basketball, track and field, golf, tennis, men's and women's soccer, swimming, wrestling, and rodeo.

The Carlsbad Velo Cycling Club, a local bicycle club began hosting the Cavern City Classic Omnium in 2012 with large success; weekly rides are held on Saturdays giving riders a chance to see much of the surrounding landscape. Annual races for running and walking are organized by the Carlsbad Runner's Club and National Night Out.

== Infrastructure ==
=== Transportation ===
==== Major highways ====
Two main highways run through the city:

- US Highway 62/180 is named Canal Street as it enters the city from the southwest; at the intersection of Greene Street, 62/180 heads east.
- US Highway 285 is named Canal Street as it intersects 62/180 from the southeast; at the intersection of Pierce Street, 285 branches north.

==== Bridges ====
There are three road bridges that cross waterways and serve the municipality:

- Bataan Bridge crosses the Pecos River on East Greene Street.
- North Canal Bridge crosses the Pecos River on North Canal Street.
- South Canal Bridge crosses Dark Canyon Draw on South Canal Street.

==== Mass transit ====
The Carlsbad Municipal Transit System (CMTS) provides public transportation within the city limits of Carlsbad and portions of Eddy County immediately adjacent to the city. CMTS operates three fixed routes and a general dial-a-ride service. Established in June 1996, CMTS operates a fleet of 17 vans and services persons with disabilities, seniors, students, and the general public. Average monthly ridership is approximately 4,800.

New Mexico Transportation Services, a private company, provides daily transportation to and from the Waste Isolation Pilot Plant for employees at fixed pick up locations throughout town.

==== Bus service ====
Greyhound Lines stops in Carlsbad on route 463 between El Paso and Lubbock, Texas.

==== Airports ====
===== Regional =====
- Cavern City Air Terminal (CNM) is located just south of Carlsbad, with Contour Airlines currently offering non-stop service to Albuquerque and Denver under an Essential Air Service (EAS) contract.
- Roswell International Air Center (ROW), located 73 miles (117 km) north of Carlsbad in Roswell, New Mexico, is served by American Eagle offering daily service to Dallas/Fort Worth International Airport and Phoenix Sky Harbor International Airport.
- Lea County Regional Airport (HOB), located 67 miles (108 km) east of Carlsbad in Hobbs, New Mexico, is served by United Express offering daily service to George Bush Intercontinental Airport in Houston.

===== International =====
- El Paso International Airport (ELP) is located in the northeastern part of El Paso, Texas, 158 miles (254 km) west of Carlsbad.
- Midland International Airport (MAF) is located southeast of Midland, Texas, 144 miles (232 km) southeast of Carlsbad.

==== Rail ====
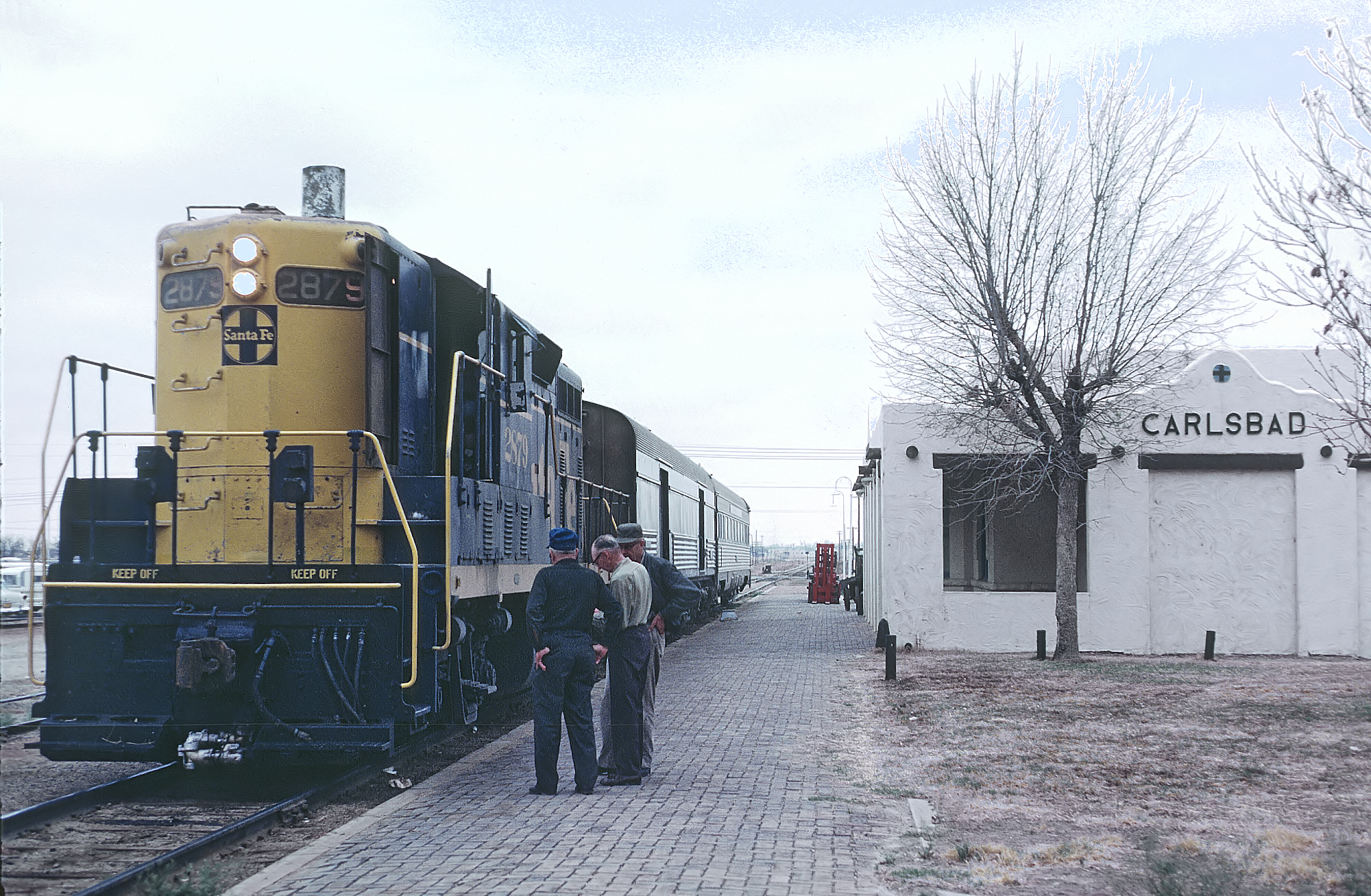
A Santa Fe Railway passenger train at Carlsbad in 1967

BNSF Railway provides freight service in the Carlsbad area, mainly to the local potash mines. Two yard operations are present in Carlsbad: one between Muscatel Avenue and Orchard Lane, and the other between Greene and Church Streets. Currently there is no intercity passenger service. Passenger service to Carlsbad was previously operated by BNSF predecessor Santa Fe Railway. The former station at 110 E Fox Street is still standing.

=== Utilities ===
==== Energy ====
Xcel Energy provides electricity to the Carlsbad area. New Mexico Gas Company provides natural gas services to more than 500,000 customers in the state, including Carlsbad.

==== Sanitation ====
The City of Carlsbad is responsible for the delivery of drinking water and the treatment of wastewater. The city also provides trash service to residents. Trash is sent to the Sandpoint Landfill east of town operated by Eddy County.

=== Healthcare ===
Carlsbad Medical Center is the primary hospital facility serving the greater Carlsbad area, operated by Community Health Systems. CMC is a 127-bed acute-care facility, including a 24-hour emergency room, imaging systems, and other services.

On September 10, 2019, CNN televised a news story on The Carlsbad Medical Center. The story was titled, "When some patients don't pay, this hospital sues." The news item addressed the remote community's limited hospital care options, and seized wages for exorbitant billing.

The town is also home to dialysis clinics, MRI facilities, an oncology center, and specialty clinics. Carlsbad Mental Health Association provides mental-health services, substance-abuse treatment, family and youth counseling, psychiatric services and employee-assistance programs.

== Research, development, and technology facilities ==
Carlsbad has several research facilities, such as the Carlsbad Environmental Monitoring and Research Center (operated by New Mexico State University) and the National Cave and Karst Research Institute (operated by New Mexico Tech, the National Park Service, and the City of Carlsbad). The United States Department of Energy's Sandia National Labs and Los Alamos National Laboratory each have branch operations in Carlsbad. The Carlsbad Department of Development and the City operate the Aero-Tech Industrial Technology Park including the Advanced Manufacturing and Innovation Training Center.

== Points of interest ==
- Carlsbad Caverns National Park, 20 miles (32 km) southwest
- Carlsbad Museum & Art Center
- Carlsbad Skate Park
- The Cascades of Carlsbad
- Cavern City Renaissance Festival
- Guadalupe Mountains National Park, 54 miles (87 km) southwest, in Texas
- Lincoln National Forest, 40 miles (64 km) west
- Living Desert Zoo and Gardens State Park, which features a painting bear. Maggie Oso paints with her paws in a variety of non-toxic paint colors and heavy white paper that the zoo curator places in her holding area. Maggie can choose the color of paint to use and the pattern that she will paint. Maggie's paintings are matted and framed for the public to see. Maggie's art work has been featured in several art exhibits throughout Carlsbad.
- National Cave and Karst Research Institute
- Pecos River Flume
- Project Gnome, 30 miles (48 km) east
- Project Playground
- The Artist Gallery

== Notable people ==
- "Mrs. M. E. Fox, sister of C. B. Eddy, visiting from New York, bet she could shoot an antelope, did so, and collected her bets. Fox St. is named for her."
- Shane Andrews, Major League Baseball
- Dan Blocker, actor who played "Hoss" Cartwright in the TV series Bonanza, was a sixth-grade teacher and coach at Eddy Elementary School
- Bruce Cabot, actor who played Jack Driscoll in the 1933 film King Kong; appeared in many of close friend John Wayne's films
- Jason D. Cunningham, Air Force Pararescueman who died saving lives of 10 fellow servicemen; Air Force Cross recipient
- Sam Etcheverry, professional football player in the National Football League and Canadian Football League
- William Flores, United States Coast Guard seaman apprentice, Coast Guard Medal recipient, and namesake of the USCGC William Flores
- Alfred A. Freeman, New Mexico territorial judge and Tennessee politician
- F. Drew Gaffney, Payload Specialist aboard STS-40 and professor at Vanderbilt University
- Michael P. Grace II, an oil and gas producer who was based in the city in the 1960s to the 1970s. He was formerly a theater producer, composer, and lyricist in the 1950s. He was the former husband to Corinne B. Grace.
- Corinne B. Grace, oil and gas producer who was based in the city from the 1960s to the 1990s. She was formerly an actress on stage and in television commercials. She was the former wife of Michael P. Grace II.
- Mark Jackson, gridiron football player
- Bob Kelly, American Football League defensive lineman and offensive lineman for the Houston Oilers, the Kansas City Chiefs, and the Cincinnati Bengals
- Trevor Rogers, Major League Baseball pitcher for the Miami Marlins
- Cody Ross, Major League Baseball outfielder for the Arizona Diamondbacks
- Barry Sadler, author, musician, and decorated combat veteran; best known for series of novels focusing on Casca Rufio Longinius and for composing song "Ballad of the Green Berets".
- Sonny Throckmorton, singer and songwriter
- Linda Wertheimer, senior correspondent for National Public Radio
- Jim White, discoverer and explorer of Carlsbad Caverns.
- John Wooten, National Football League played for the Cleveland Browns and Washington Redskins
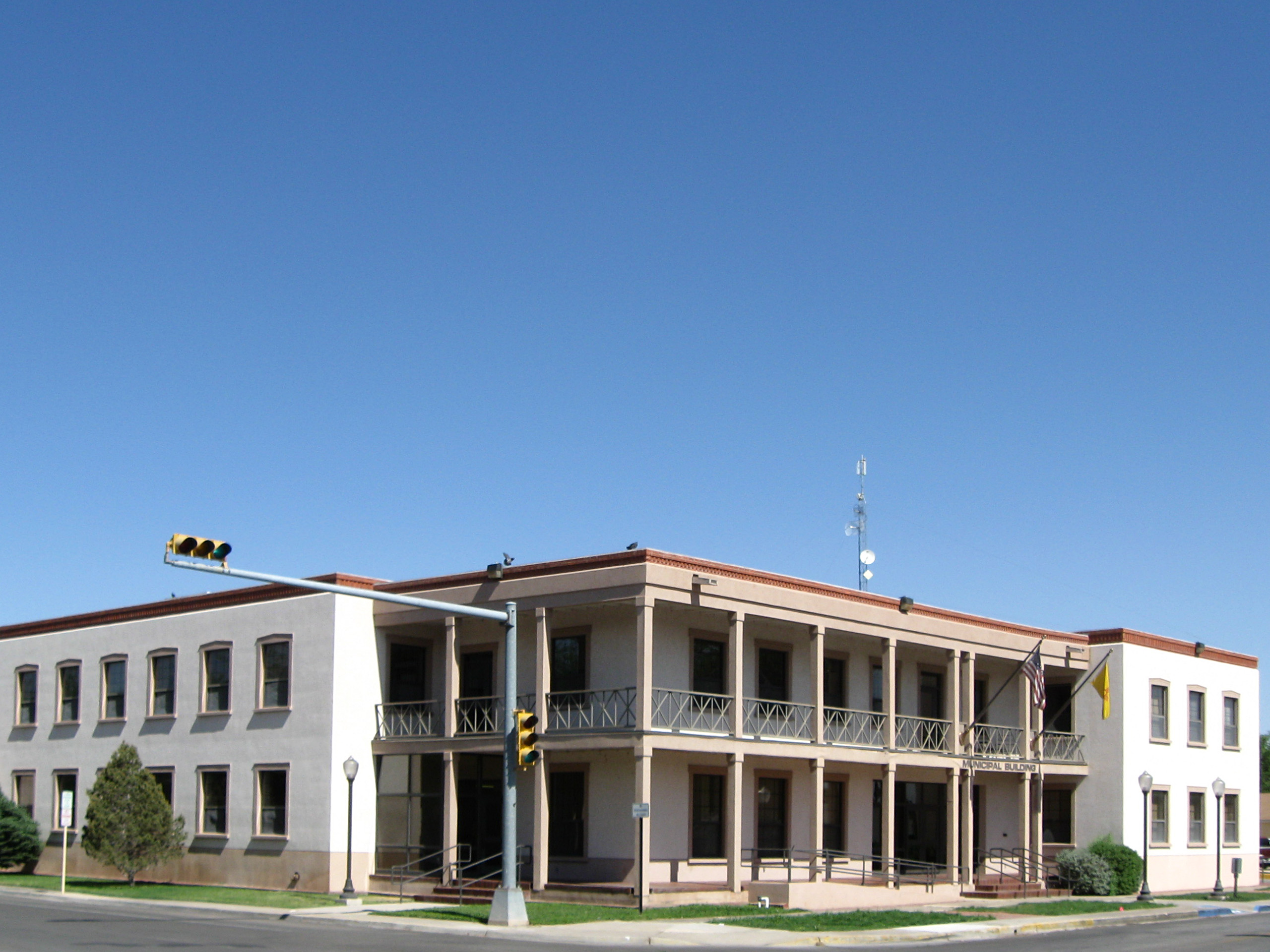
Carlsbad Municipal Building

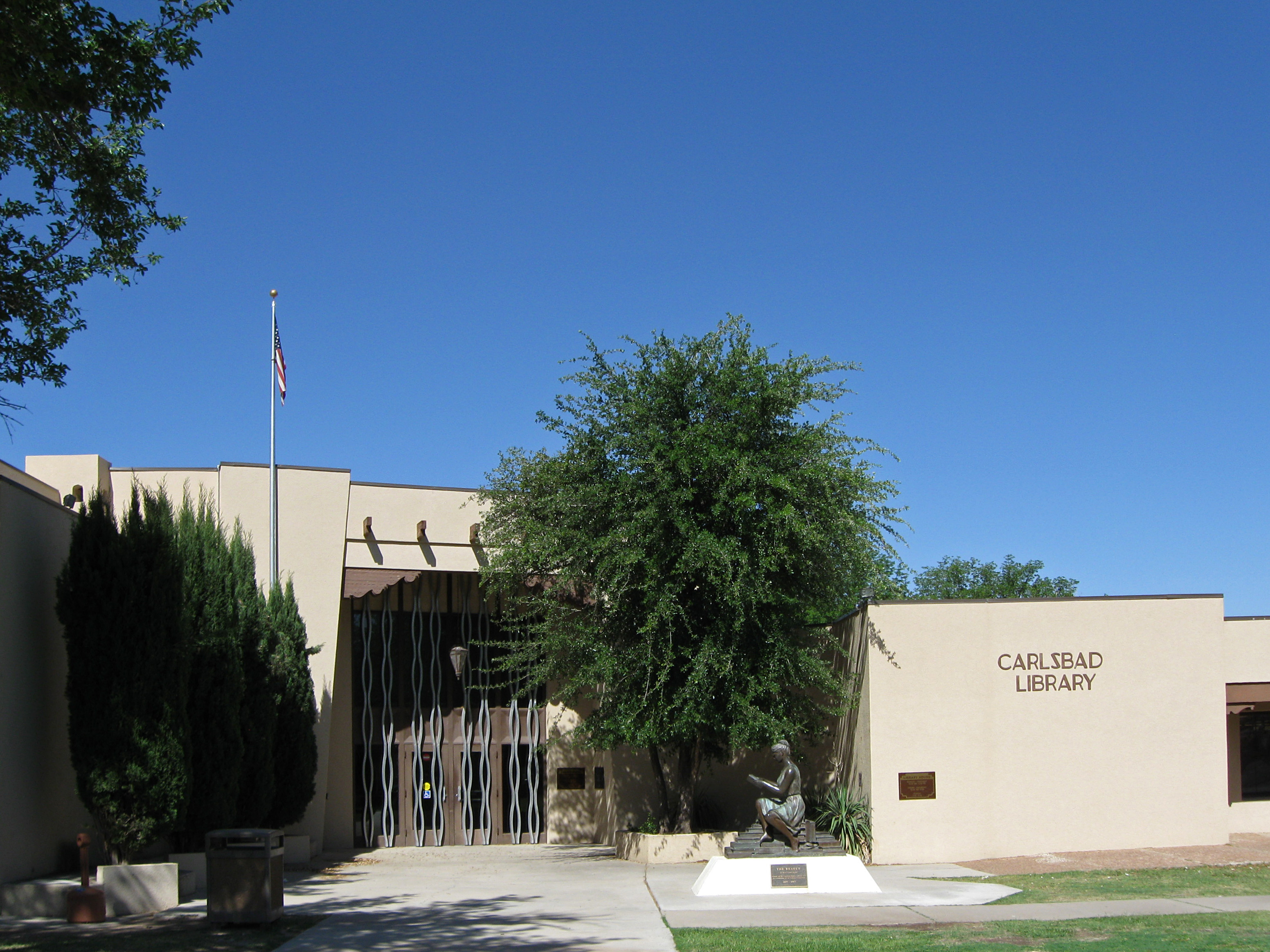
Carlsbad Public Library

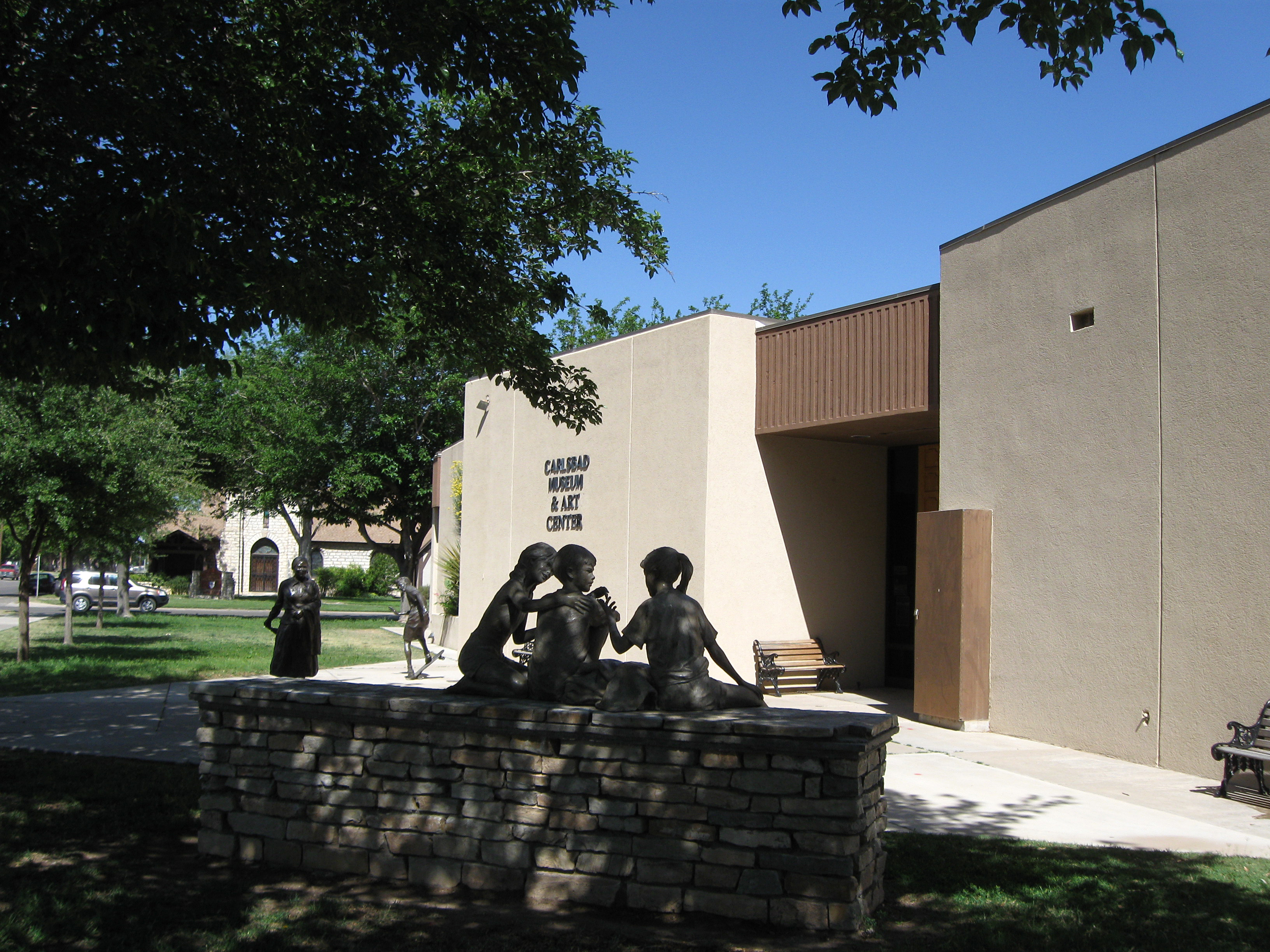
Carlsbad Museum
