= National Register of Historic Places listings in Eddy County, New Mexico =

Location of Eddy County in New Mexico

This is a list of the National Register of Historic Places listings in Eddy County, New Mexico.

This is intended to be a complete list of the properties and districts on the National Register of Historic Places in Eddy County, New Mexico, United States. Latitude and longitude coordinates are provided for many National Register properties and districts; these locations may be seen together in a map.

There are 33 properties and districts listed on the National Register in the county, including 1 National Historic Landmark. All of the places within the county on the National Register are also listed on the State Register of Cultural Properties.

This National Park Service list is complete through NPS recent listings posted May 1, 2026.

Contents: NRHP in New Mexico by county
Bernalillo – Catron – Chaves – Cibola – Colfax – Curry – De Baca – Doña Ana – Eddy – Grant – Guadalupe – Harding – Hidalgo – Lea – Lincoln – Los Alamos – Luna – McKinley – Mora – Otero – Quay – Rio Arriba – Roosevelt – San Juan – San Miguel – Sandoval – Santa Fe – Sierra – Socorro – Taos – Torrance – Union – Valencia

== Current listings ==
	Name on the Register	Image	Date listed	Location	City or town	Description
1	Abo Elementary School and Fallout Shelter	Abo Elementary School and Fallout Shelter	September 29, 1999 (#99001171)	1802 Center Ave. 32°49′57″N 104°25′09″W	Artesia	
2	John Acord House	John Acord House	March 2, 1984 (#84002891)	W. Main St. 32°50′31″N 104°24′21″W	Artesia	
3	Archeological Site No. AR 03-08-03-195		November 24, 1995 (#95001319)	Address Restricted	Queen	
4	Archeological Site No. AR-03-08-03-232		November 24, 1995 (#95001320)	Address Restricted	Queen	
5	Armandine		May 22, 2003 (#03000418)	1301 N. Canal St; 32°26′25″N 104°13′49″W	Carlsbad	
6	Artesia Residential Historic District		September 25, 2014 (#09001267)	Roughly bounded by W. Main St. on the north, W. Missouri Ave. on the south, S. 2nd St. on the east, and S. 10th St. on the west 32°50′24″N 104°24′15″W	Artesia	
7	Willie D. Atkeson House	Willie D. Atkeson House	March 2, 1984 (#84002894)	303 W. Grand Ave. 32°50′19″N 104°23′52″W	Artesia	
8	Baskin Building	Baskin Building	July 18, 1990 (#90000599)	332 W. Main St. 32°50′33″N 104°24′01″W	Artesia	
9	William Baskin House	William Baskin House	March 2, 1984 (#84002898)	811 W. Quay Ave. 32°50′27″N 104°24′24″W	Artesia	
10	Carlsbad Irrigation District	Carlsbad Irrigation District	October 15, 1966 (#66000476)	North of Carlsbad; 32°29′31″N 104°15′09″W	Carlsbad	
11	The Caverns Historic District	The Caverns Historic District	August 18, 1988 (#88001173)	End of State Road 7; also 7 miles west of U.S. Routes 62/180 at the end of State Route 7; 32°10′37″N 104°26′31″W	Carlsbad	Carlsbad Caverns National Park; Second set of boundaries represents a boundary increase of January 8, 2014
12	Dam-Sitting Bull Falls Recreation Area		December 23, 1993 (#93001420)	Sitting Bull Falls in the Lincoln National Forest; 32°14′42″N 104°41′42″W	Carlsbad	
13	Dark Canyon Apache Rancheria-Military Battle Site		February 15, 2002 (#02000083)	Address Restricted	Queen	
14	First National Bank of Eddy	First National Bank of Eddy	December 12, 1976 (#76001196)	303 W. Fox St. 32°25′08″N 104°13′44″W	Carlsbad	
15	Edward R. Gesler House	Edward R. Gesler House	March 2, 1984 (#84002924)	411 W. Missouri Ave. 32°50′15″N 104°24′06″W	Artesia	
16	Group Picnic Shelter-Sitting Bull Falls Recreation Area		December 23, 1993 (#93001419)	Sitting Bull Falls in the Lincoln National Forest; 32°14′45″N 104°41′47″W	Carlsbad	
17	Hodges-Runyan-Brainard House	Hodges-Runyan-Brainard House	March 2, 1984 (#84002925)	504 W. Quay Ave. 32°50′29″N 104°24′09″W	Artesia	
18	Hodges-Sipple House	Hodges-Sipple House	March 2, 1984 (#84002926)	804 W. Missouri Ave. 32°50′17″N 104°24′22″W	Artesia	
19	LA 157206-White Oaks Pictograph Site		November 22, 2011 (#11000829)	Address Restricted	Queen	
20	LA 158783-Ambush Site		November 22, 2011 (#11000825)	Address Restricted	Queen	
21	LA 162411-Lost Again Shelter		November 22, 2011 (#11000828)	Address Restricted	Queen	
22	LA 64908-Ambush Two Hands Shelter		November 22, 2011 (#11000826)	Address Restricted	Queen	
23	LA 71921-Horse Well Shelters		November 22, 2011 (#11000827)	Address Restricted	Queen	
24	Last Chance Canyon Apache-Cavalry Battle Site		October 24, 2000 (#00001230)	Address Restricted	Queen	
25	F. L. Lukins House	F. L. Lukins House	March 2, 1984 (#84002928)	801 W. Richardson Ave. 32°50′23″N 104°24′21″W	Artesia	
26	Mauldin-Hall House	Mauldin-Hall House	March 2, 1984 (#84002930)	501 S. Roselawn Ave. 32°50′16″N 104°23′56″W	Artesia	
27	Moore-Ward Cobblestone House	Moore-Ward Cobblestone House	February 16, 1984 (#84002932)	505 W. Richardson Ave. 32°50′23″N 104°24′09″W	Artesia	
28	Painted Grotto	Painted Grotto	March 8, 1977 (#77000159)	Address Restricted	Carlsbad	Carlsbad Caverns National Park
29	Picnic Shelter-Sitting Bull Falls Recreation Area		December 23, 1993 (#93001418)	Sitting Bull Falls in the Lincoln National Forest; 32°14′42″N 104°41′44″W	Carlsbad	
30	Rattlesnake Springs Historic District	Rattlesnake Springs Historic District	July 14, 1988 (#88001130)	West of U.S. Routes 62/180 off County Road 418; 32°06′36″N 104°28′04″W	Carlsbad	Carlsbad Caverns National Park
31	Sallie Chisum Robert House	Sallie Chisum Robert House	March 2, 1984 (#84002939)	801 W. Texas St. 32°50′35″N 104°24′21″W	Artesia	
32	Dr. Robert M. Ross House		March 2, 1984 (#84002936)	1002 S. Roselawn Ave. 32°49′53″N 104°23′58″W	Artesia	
33	Rober Weems and Mary E. Tansill House		October 10, 2002 (#02001111)	1612 N. Guadalupe St. 32°26′57″N 104°13′53″W	Carlsbad	

== Former listing ==
	Name on the Register	Image	Date listed	Date removed	Location	City or town	Description
1	Sipple-Ward Building		October 4, 1991 (#91001503)	September 6, 2007	331 West Main Street	Artesia	Destroyed by fire on October 31, 2000.

== See also ==
- List of National Historic Landmarks in New Mexico
- National Register of Historic Places listings in New Mexico
