= Hodges House =

Hodges House may refer to:

in the United States

(by state then city)

- Peter B. Hodges House, Yuma, Arizona, listed on the National Register of Historic Places (NRHP) in Yuma County
- Hodges House (Bismarck, Arkansas), listed on the NRHP in Hot Spring County
- Hodges House (Carrollton, Illinois), NRHP-listed in Greene County
- Blankenship-Hodges-Brown House, Paragon, Indiana, listed on the NRHP in Morgan County
- Hodges House (Cotton Valley, Louisiana), listed on the NRHP in Webster Parish
- Hodges House (Taunton, Massachusetts), NRHP-listed in Bristol County
- Hodges-Runyan-Brainard House, Artesia, New Mexico, listed on the NRHP in Eddy County
- Hodges-Sipple House, Artesia, New Mexico, listed on the NRHP in Eddy County
- Eugene Wilson Hodges Farm, Charlotte, North Carolina, listed on the NRHP in Mecklenburg County
- Hodges-Hardy-Chambers House, Wichita Falls, Texas, listed on the NRHP in Wichita County

== See also ==
- Hodgson House (disambiguation)
