= Indian Police =

Indian Police may refer to:

== India ==
- Law enforcement in India
- Indian Police Service, which provides leaders and commanders to staff the federal Central Armed Police Forces, and state and other security agencies of India, its members are the senior officers of the police force of India

== Canada ==
- First Nations Policing Program (FNPP), administered by Public Safety Canada
- First Nations Community Policing Service of the Royal Canadian Mounted Police
- Indigenous police in Canada

== United States ==
- Bureau of Indian Affairs Police
- United States Indian Police
- Indian agency police
- Indian tribal police

== See also ==
- Indian Police Force (web series), an Indian cop drama
