= College of Artesia =

Private college in Artesia, New Mexico, US

Coordinates: 32°51′32″N 104°24′59″W

- Type: Private Liberal Arts College
- Active: 1966–1973
- Location: Artesia, New Mexico, United States
- Campus: Urban
- Mascot: Roadrunner

The College of Artesia was a private liberal arts college that operated from 1966 to 1973 in Artesia, New Mexico. It was one of several colleges established by local civic leaders with the support and encouragement of Parsons College in Fairfield, Iowa. These Parsons "satellite schools" were by-products of the strong growth and apparent success of Parsons during the late 1950s and early 1960s, and all followed the "Parsons Plan" academic model developed at that school. None of the schools, however, was ultimately successful.

The "Parsons Plan" academic model employed at Artesia was the brainchild of Millard Roberts, who was the president of Parsons College from 1955 to 1967; the multi-faceted plan featured innovative teaching and administrative techniques, and emphasized the recruitment of a geographically and academically diverse student body. Among other characteristics, the "Parsons Plan" schools welcomed unconventional students who had not seen success at other colleges. In the 1960s, the schools were also attended by a substantial number of young men seeking draft deferments that would allow them to avoid military service during the Vietnam War.

At least initially, Artesia's reputation and fortunes were strongly tied to those of Parsons, and when Parsons faltered in the late 1960s the prospects for Artesia and the other Parsons satellite schools grew bleak. Although the satellite schools ended their relationships with Parsons, they suffered from a lack of funding, high student turnover, and accreditation issues. Ultimately, none of the "Parsons Plan" colleges became economically viable, and all closed by the mid-1970s. The College of Artesia closed in 1971. The former campus was occupied by Artesia Christian College from 1975 to 1985.

== Federal Law Enforcement Training Center ==
On Sept. 22, 1988, President Ronald Reagan signed the Treasury, Postal Service and General Government Appropriations Act, House Resolution 4775, to grant the purchase, renovation, and adaptation of a former college campus in Artesia, New Mexico, as a Federal Law Enforcement Training Center facility.

The following year, FLETC-Artesia was officially established as a training delivery point. The original Dedication Ceremony was held on Oct. 21, 1989. FLETC-Artesia currently occupies more than 3,600 acres, and is FLETC's largest training site by acreage and second largest by students trained.

In 2004 all Federal Law Enforcement Training Centers were transferred from United States Department of the Treasury to the newly created United States Department of Homeland Security. FLETC Artesia trains recruits for the United States Border Patrol, United States Secret Service, Bureau of Indian Affairs Police, and the Federal Air Marshal Service.
