= F. L. Lukins House =

Historic house in New Mexico, United States

- U.S. National Register of Historic Places
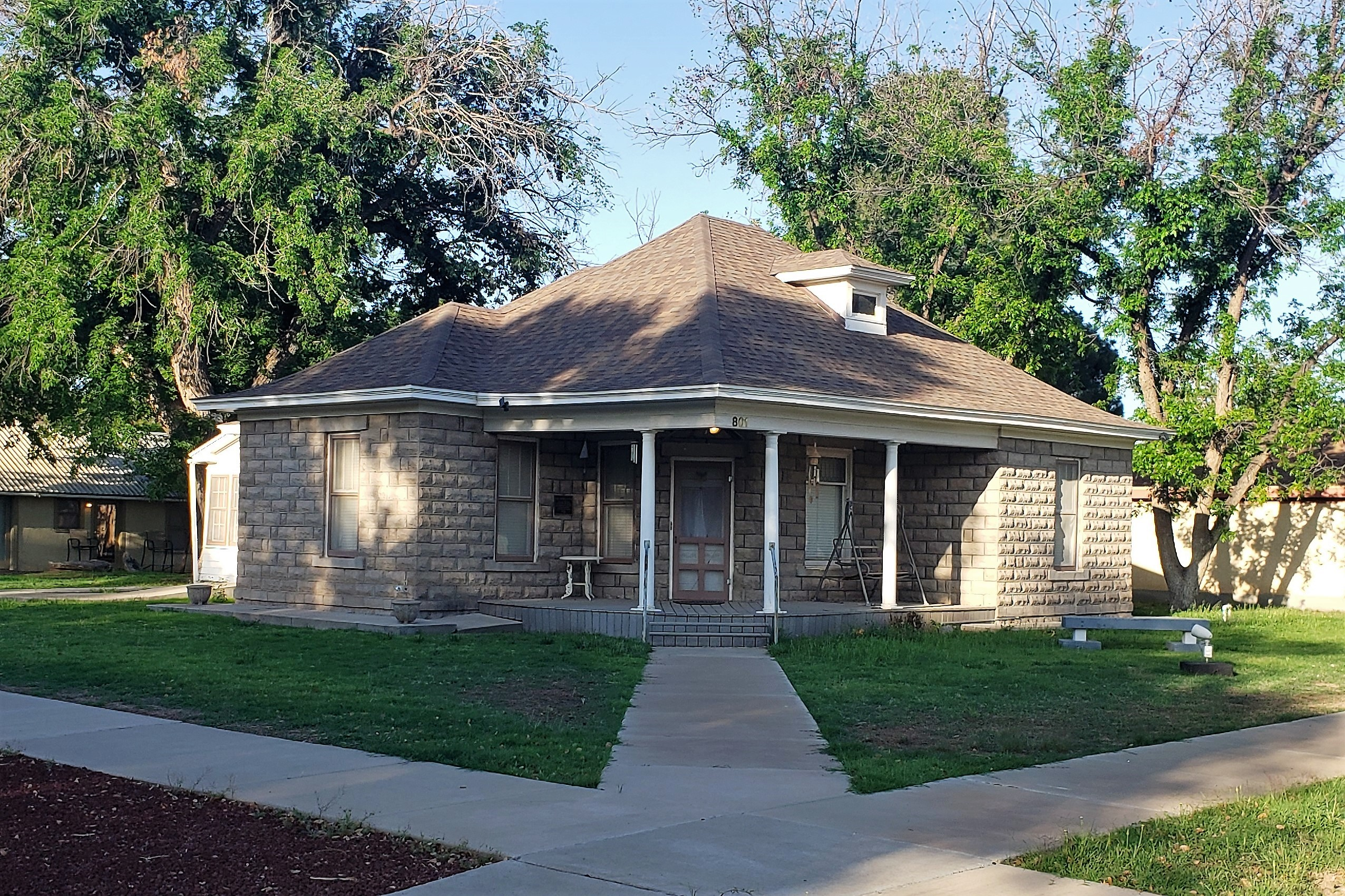

- Location within New Mexico
- Location: 801 W. Richardson Ave., Artesia, New Mexico
- Coordinates: 32°50′23″N 104°24′21″W
- Area: less than one acre
- Built: 1906
- Architectural style: Queen Anne
- MPS: Artificial Stone Houses of Artesia TR
- NRHP reference No.: 84002928
- Added to NRHP: March 2, 1984

The F. L. Lukins House is a historic house in Artesia, New Mexico. It was built in 1906 for William Major, who later sold it to F. L. Lukins. The house was designed in the Queen Anne architectural style. It has been listed on the National Register of Historic Places since March 2, 1984.
