= Avalon Dam =

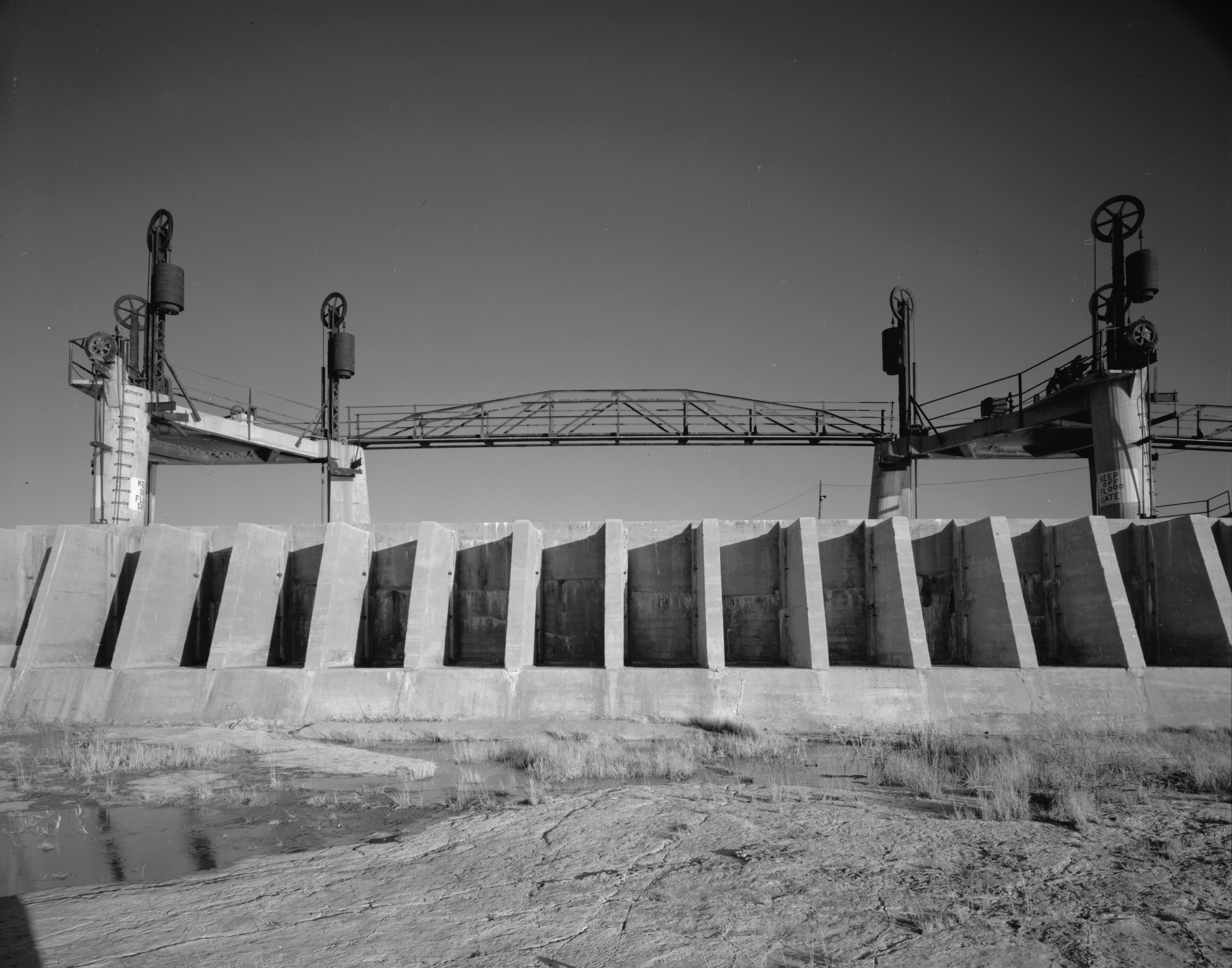
- Spillway #2

- Location within New Mexico
- Country: United States
- Location: Eddy County, New Mexico
- Coordinates: 32°29′27″N 104°15′08″W
- Purpose: Irrigation and flood control
- Opening date: 1888
- Owner: United States Bureau of Reclamation
- Operator: Carlsbad Irrigation District

Dam and spillways
- Height: 60 feet (18 m)

Reservoir
- Total capacity: 202,000 cubic yards (154,000 m^{3})
- Normal elevation: 3,146 ft (959 m)

Avalon Dam is a small dam on the Pecos River about 5 miles (8.0 km) north of Carlsbad, New Mexico, United States. The dam is a storage and regulating reservoir, and diverts water into the main canal of the Carlsbad Project, an irrigation scheme.

== Location ==
The Pecos River, a major tributary of the Rio Grande, originates in the mountains near Santa Fe, New Mexico, then flows through the relatively flat southeastern New Mexico plains. Temperatures in the summer may be as high as 111 °F (44 °C). On average there is only 12.5 inches (320 mm) of precipitation annually, but storms may bring torrential rainfall, creating flash floods. In the late 1880s, settlers were looking for new land to farm in the west, but irrigation was essential in the Pecos Valley.

== History ==
The dam was originally built as an earthfill structure in 1888 by private interests. That dam was washed out in 1893. It was quickly rebuilt, but was washed out again in 1904 by the Pecos River flood of that year. In 1907 the United States Bureau of Reclamation rebuilt the dam. The height of the dam was raised in 1912, and again in 1936.

=== Original dams ===
A group of local ranchers that included Charles B. Eddy and Pat Garrett (Note: Pat Garrett was the former sheriff who killed Billy the kid) saw a commercial opportunity in irrigating the valley and selling or leasing their land to settlers. They created an irrigation company and obtained funding from outside financiers including James John Hagerman, who had made a fortune from the Mollie Gibson silver mine in Colorado. The new company started to construct the Avalon Dam and major irrigation works. Hagerman and his associates became the dominant owners, reorganized the company, started a railroad and promoted a new town at first called Eddy, later changed to Carlsbad.

The dam was built to the north of the town, completed in 1889. It was one of the first irrigation dams in the United States to be constructed of loose rock with an upstream face of earth. It had an innovative sluice gate that directed river water into the system's Main Canal. There was a wooden flume so long and wide that four mule teams could walk across it, side by side. Four years after the dam was completed, in 1893 a flood breached its crest, damaging the new canals and the massive flume.

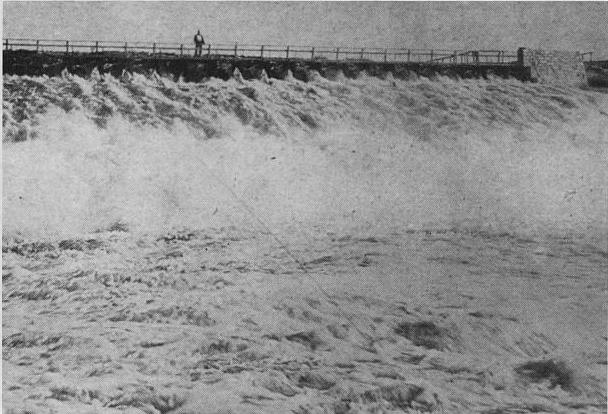
Spillway of the second dam in 1903, before the flood washed it out

The company did not waste time, but hired 500 men and 165 horse teams to quickly rebuild the dam with an almost identical cross-section to the original dam. The flume and canals also were repaired in time for the 1894 growing season, although the farmers had difficulty finding crops suited to the soil and climate. In 1902–1903, the Pecos Irrigation Company spent another $50,000 reinforcing the flume with concrete and four pairs of arches. Mark Hufstetler and Lon Johnson write that the massive, yet graceful, flume, "was a source of pride for the company and the Carlsbad community." Measuring 497 feet long by 47 feet high, it was said to be the largest irrigation flume in the United States. Soon after the flume had been completed, in October 1904 there was another flash flood in the Pecos, causing great damage to the dam, the canals, the highway and railroad bridges.

=== Reclamation Service dam ===
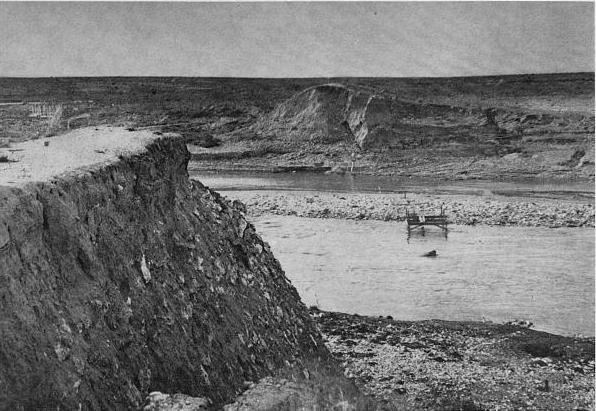
After the flood of 1904

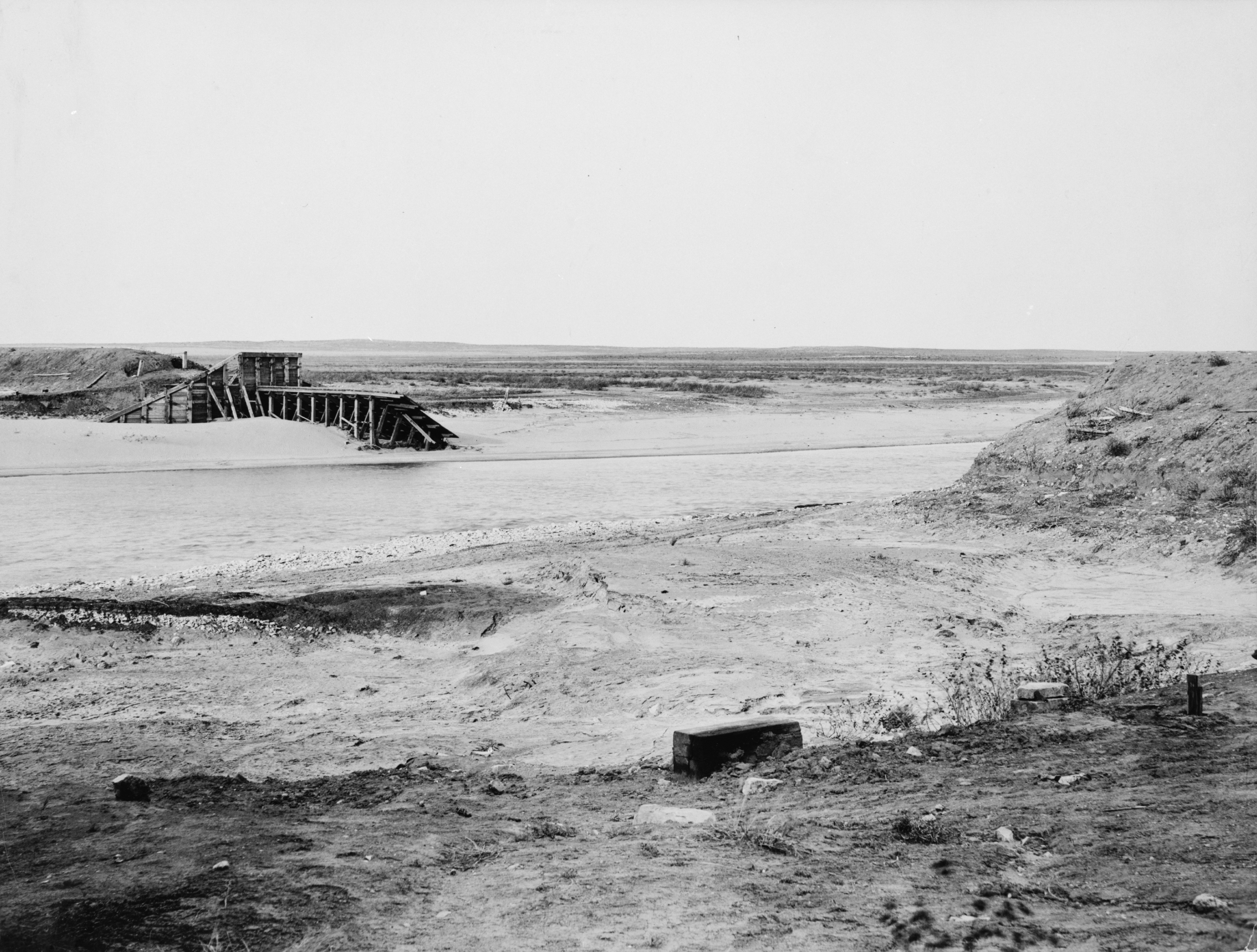
18 December 1905

The settlers required irrigation water to farm, and the Pecos Irrigation Company was almost bankrupt. They formed the Pecos Water Users Association and began advocating aggressively for the Federal Government's new Reclamation Service (today's Bureau of Reclamation) to take over the project. In December 1904, Reclamation engineers arrived to study the situation. As Reclamation evaluated, the Pecos Water Users Association raised $20,000 and, with design help from Reclamation engineers, performed temporary repairs on Avalon Dam – only to have the dam wash out again when a severe leak led to failure within hours of filling the reservoir. In November 1905, the Pecos Irrigation Company agreed to sell the remains of its systems to the Secretary of the Interior for $150,000.

Taking over the project, Reclamation set April 12, 1906, as the day it would open bids for rehabilitating what it called the Carlsbad Project, which included not only Avalon Dam but McMillan Dam and Reservoir, also built by private interests. McMillan was a storage dam, while Avalon served both to store water and divert it into the project's Main Canal. The day came to open bids but, when no offers were placed on the table, Reclamation took over the project by force account, meaning Reclamation would do the work itself, from design to the hiring of subcontractors and laborers.

By June 1, 1906, construction was under way. Once again, Avalon Dam rose on the Pecos, its latest design reflecting many of the advances made in dam engineering since the original Avalon Dam was constructed in 1889. Avalon remained an earthen dam erected atop a rock-filled foundation, but this time Federal engineers added a thin, concrete and steel core wall and enlarged the spillways to withstand future flooding. The new Avalon Dam, completed in 1907, was 1,025 feet long and up to 50 feet high. It still stands across the Pecos River, its height increased in 1912 and again in 1936; its crest now 58 feet high. Work done in the 1930s was performed by young men of the Civilian Conservation Corps, a New Deal work relief program. During the winter of 1911–1912, Reclamation also incorporated two innovative cylinder spillway gates at Avalon, a design incorporated later into the intake towers at Hoover Dam. If a flood was anticipated, the gates could be raised, allowing the reservoir to lower rapidly.

=== Later usage ===
By 1912, the Carlsbad Project was irrigating 15,000 acres and had attained a semblance of stability. In the early years of the 20th century, cotton and alfalfa were leading crops. Today, the project irrigates 25,000 acres along a 20-mile stretch of the Pecos River. Cotton and alfalfa remain the principal crops, although wheat, barley, oats, and vegetables also are produced in abundance. Although title to the Carlsbad Project remains in the hands of the Federal Government, today the Carlsbad Irrigation District, created in 1932 by water users, operates and maintains the system.

The transfer from federal to local control took place on October 1, 1949, beginning yet another chapter in the story of irrigation in the Pecos River Valley. The Carlsbad Project is a significant example of how a private irrigation effort in the American West evolved into a publicly sponsored Reclamation project and then back to a locally operated water district. Because of its significance, the irrigation district was designated a National Historic Landmark in 1964. The historic district comprises seven buildings and 22 structures, including Avalon Dam and reservoir, the Main Canal, Pecos River flume, and the First National Bank of Eddy in downtown Carlsbad, which for many years housed the offices of the Carlsbad Irrigation District.

== Structure ==
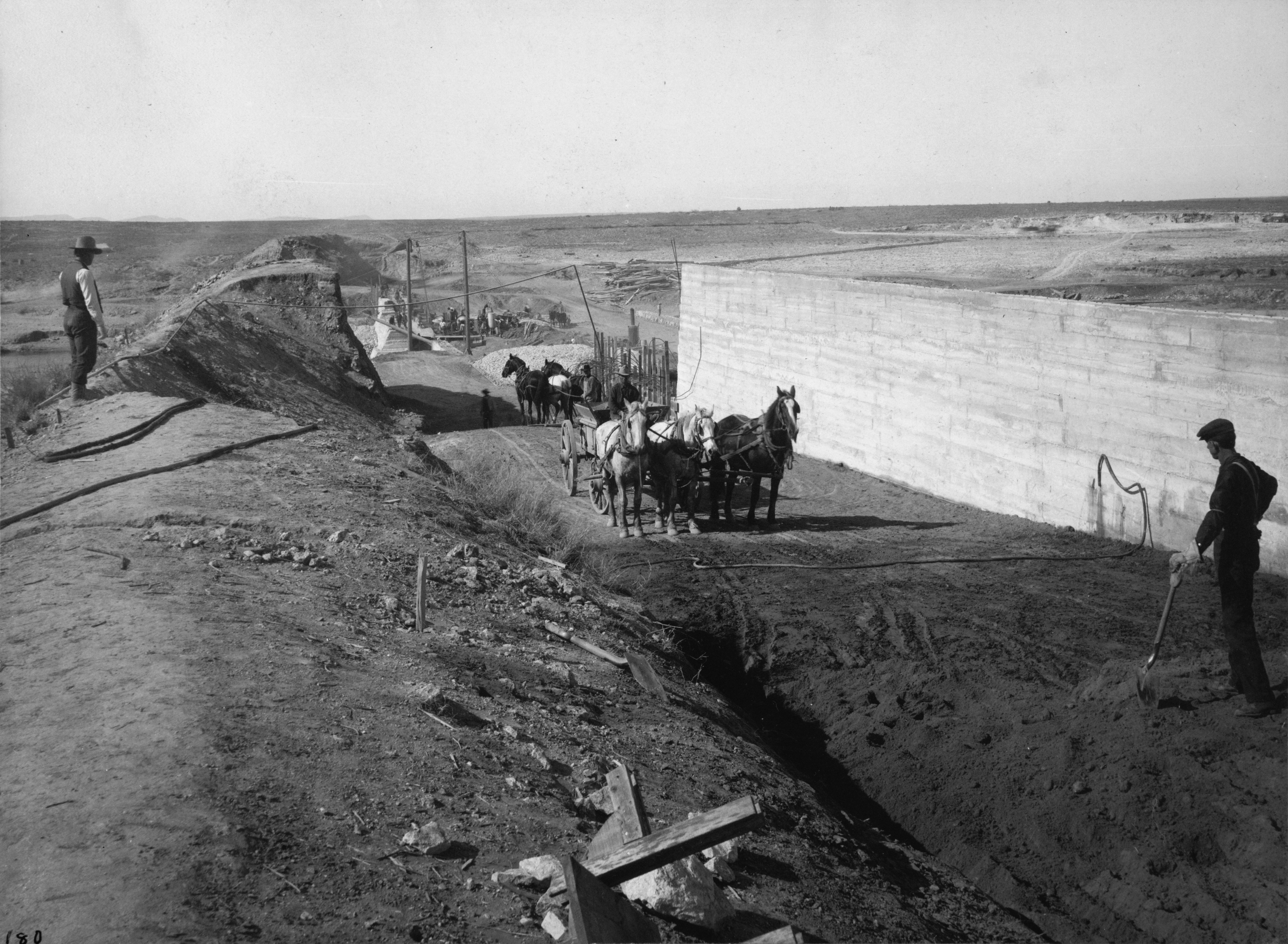
Construction of today's dam in 1907

The dam is a zoned earthfill structure with a structural height of 60 feet (18 m) and a volume of 202,000 cubic yards (154,000 m^{3}). It is 1,360 feet (410 m) long and 53 feet (16 m) The dam has three spillways and an outlet works. Capacity at the top of conservation pool is 4,466 acre-feet (5,509,000 m^{3})

== Recreational use ==
The Avalon Reservoir is open for recreational purposes all year. It is accessible by surfaced roads, and dirt roads lead round the reservoir. The Carlsbad Irrigation District manages it as a recreation facility, and the New Mexico Department of Game and Fish stocks the reservoir and provides law enforcement. Fish include white bass, catfish, and bream, and visitors may scuba dive for game fish. There are fees for boating. The reservoir has a camping area with basic facilities.
