= William Baskin House =

- U.S. National Register of Historic Places
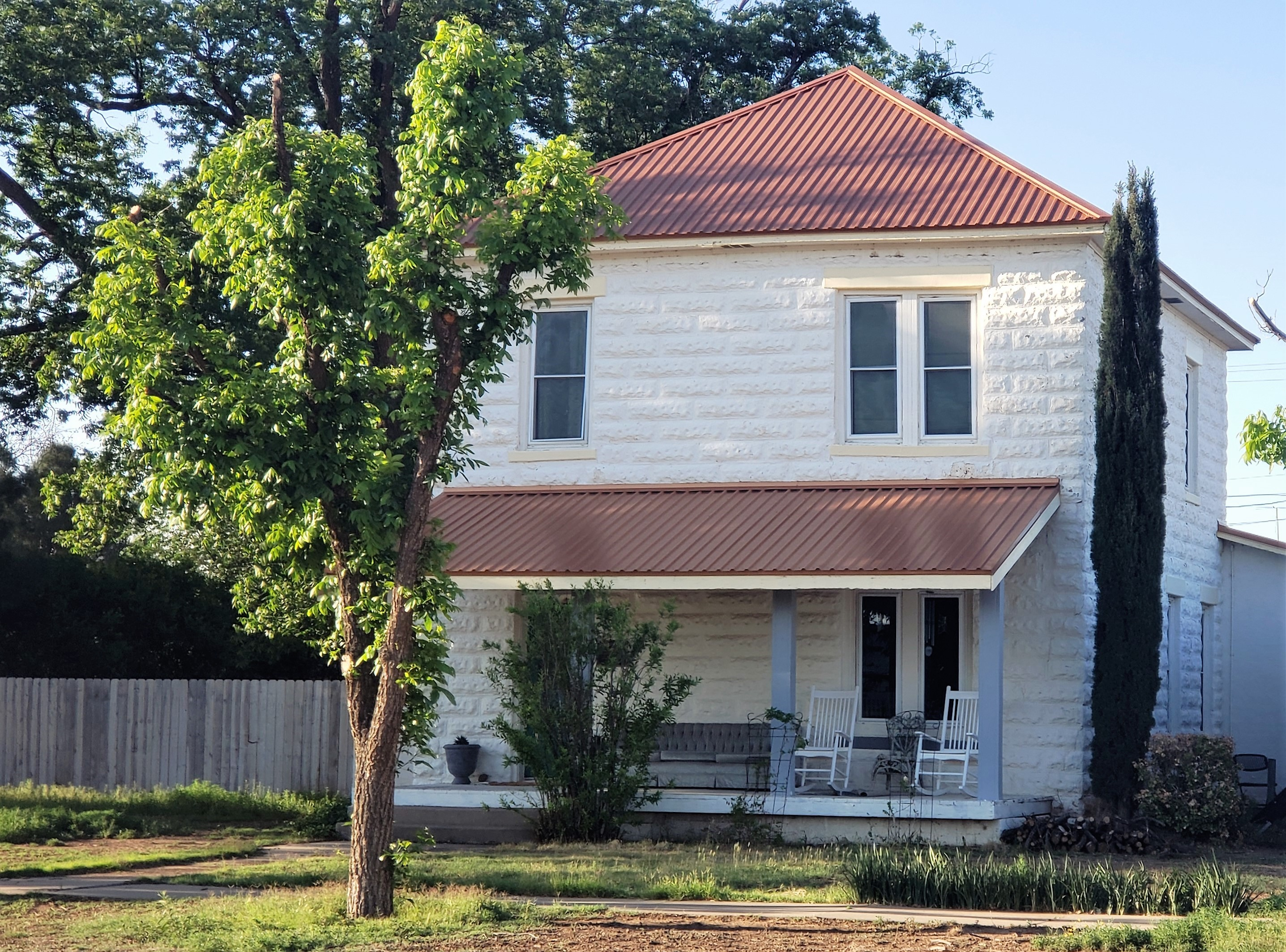

- Location within New Mexico
- Location: 811 W. Quay Ave., Artesia, New Mexico
- Coordinates: 32°50′27″N 104°24′24″W
- Area: less than one acre
- Built: 1905
- MPS: Artificial Stone Houses of Artesia TR
- NRHP reference No.: 84002898
- Added to NRHP: March 2, 1984

The William Baskin House, at 811 W. Quay Avenue in Artesia, New Mexico, was listed on the National Register of Historic Places in 1984.

It is a two-story hipped roof house built of artificial stone in 1905, and is one of the oldest surviving buildings in Artesia.

It is one of ten houses of cast-stone construction which were together listed on the National Register in 1983.

== See also ==
- Baskin Building, also NRHP-listed in Artesia
