= Sallie Chisum Robert House =

Historic house in New Mexico, United States

- U.S. National Register of Historic Places
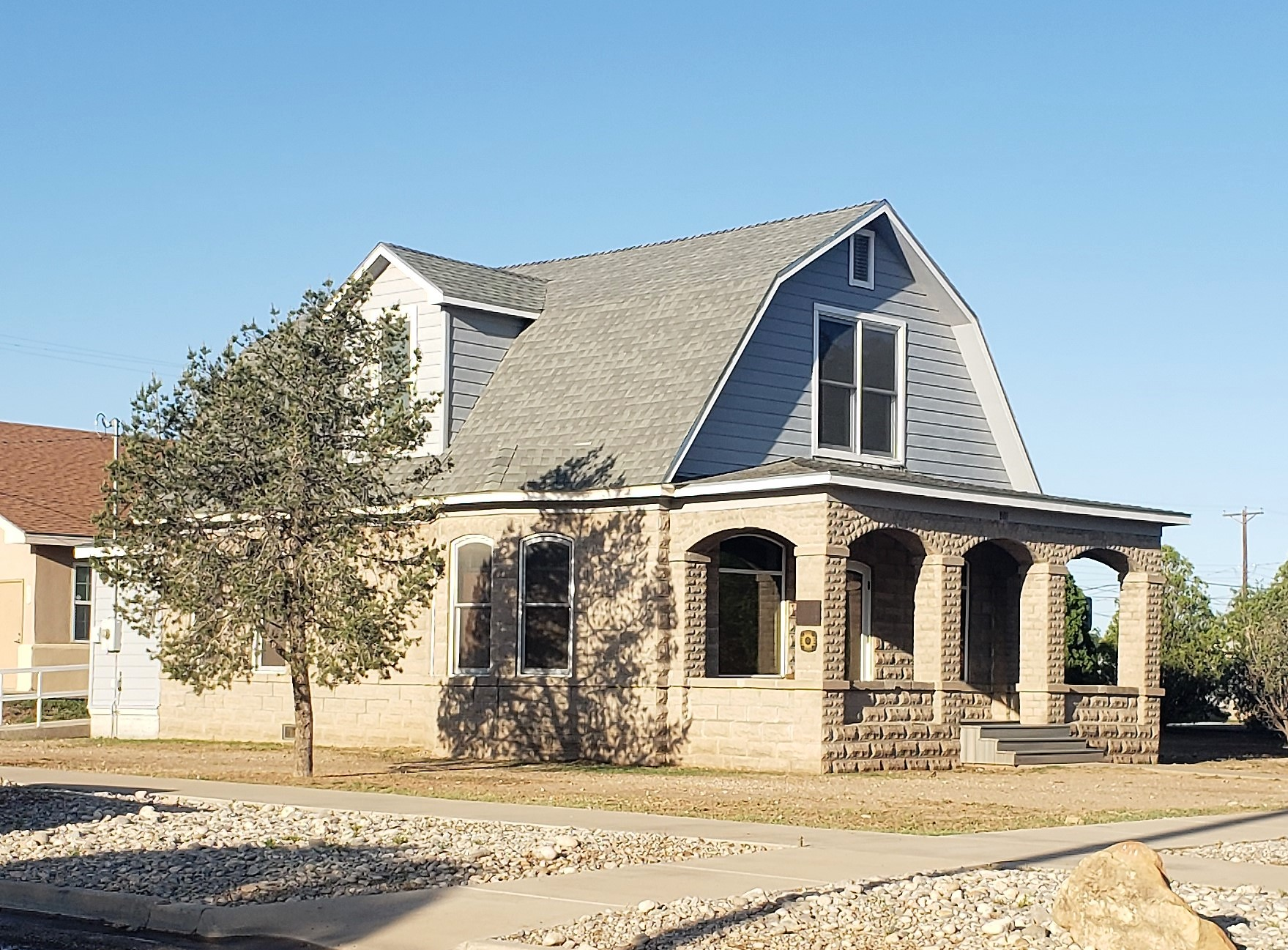

- Location within New Mexico
- Location: 801 West Texas Street, Artesia, New Mexico
- Coordinates: 32°50′35″N 104°24′21″W
- Area: less than one acre
- Built: 1908
- Architectural style: Dutch Colonial Revival
- MPS: Artificial Stone Houses of Artesia TR
- NRHP reference No.: 84002939
- Added to NRHP: March 2, 1984

The Sallie Chisum Robert House is a historic house in Artesia, New Mexico. It was built with cast stone in 1908 for Sallie Chisum Robert, one of Artesia's co-founders whose uncle was the cattle baron John Chisum. Born in Texas, she married a German immigrant, William Robert, only to divorce him and become a homesteader in Artesia; she later moved to Roswell, New Mexico. The house was designed in the Dutch Colonial Revival architectural style, with a gambrel roof. It was added to New Mexico's State Register of Cultural Properties in 1977. It has been listed on the National Register of Historic Places since March 2, 1984.
