= Dr. Robert M. Ross House =

Historic house in New Mexico, United States

- U.S. National Register of Historic Places
- Location within New Mexico
- Location: 1002 S. Roselawn Avenue, Artesia, New Mexico
- Coordinates: 32°49′53″N 104°23′58″W
- Area: less than one acre
- Built: 1904
- Architectural style: Queen Anne
- MPS: Artificial Stone Houses of Artesia TR
- NRHP reference No.: 84002936
- Added to NRHP: March 2, 1984

The Dr. Robert M. Ross House is a historic house in Artesia, New Mexico. It was built in 1904 for Dr Robert M. Ross, a physician from St. Louis, Missouri who became the founding president of the First National Bank of Artesia in 1903. His wife, who worked in the post office, co-founded the public library in Artesia. The house was designed in the Queen Anne architectural style. It has been listed on the National Register of Historic Places since March 2, 1984.
