= Moore-Ward Cobblestone House =

- U.S. National Register of Historic Places
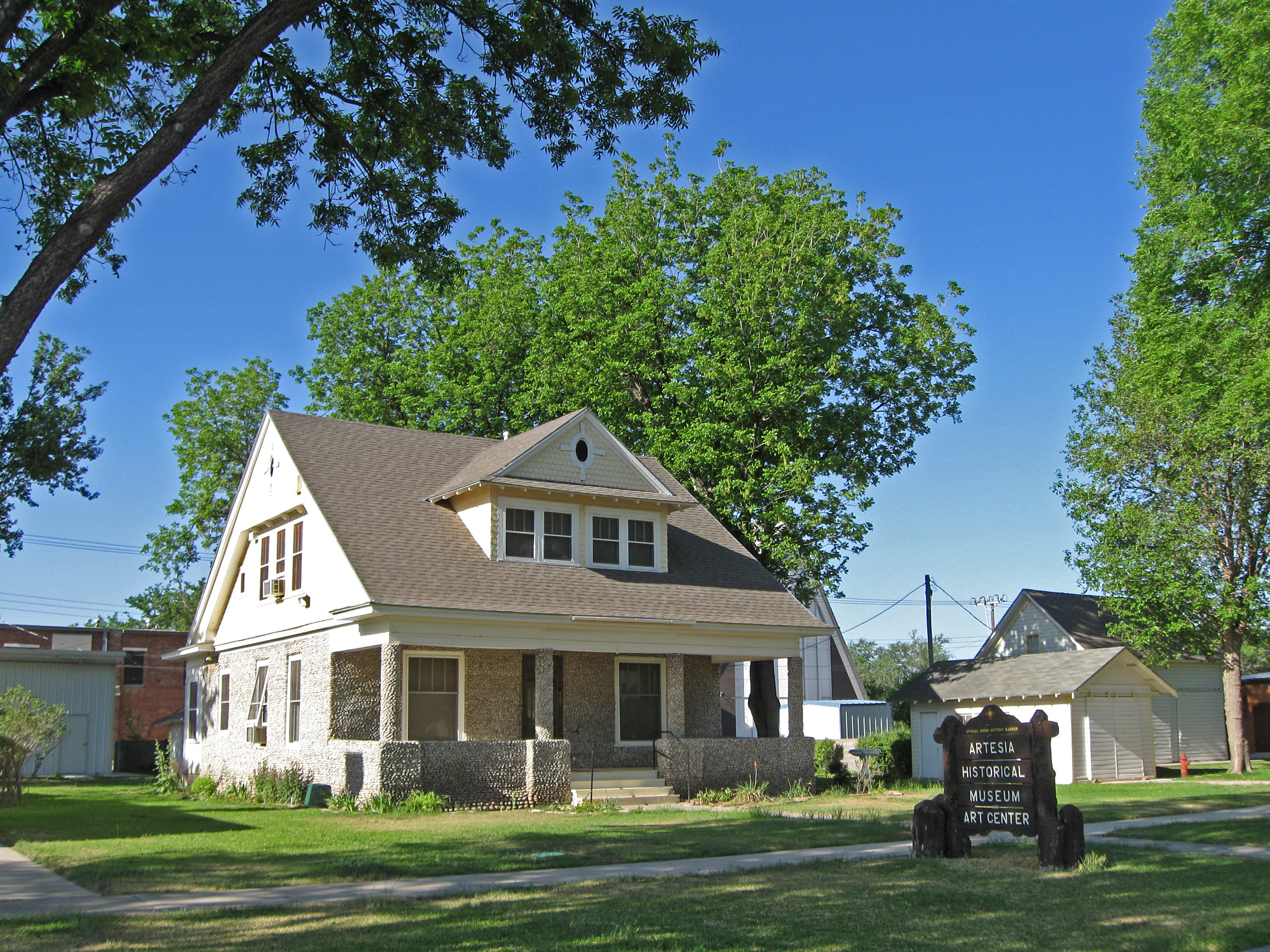

- Location within New Mexico
- Location: 505 W. Richardson Ave., Artesia, New Mexico
- Coordinates: 32°50′23″N 104°24′09″W
- Area: less than one acre
- Built: 1905
- Built by: H.F. Martin
- Architectural style: Bungalow/craftsman, Queen Anne
- NRHP reference No.: 84002932
- Added to NRHP: February 16, 1984

The Moore-Ward Cobblestone House, at 505 W. Richardson Ave. in Artesia, New Mexico, was built in 1905. It was listed on the National Register of Historic Places in 1984.

It has served as the Artesia Historical Museum. It is a one-and-a-half-story gabled house.

According to its NRHP nomination,

The Moore-Ward Cobblestone House is architecturally and historically significant as a singular and curious example of the use of native cobblestone as a building material at the time of the settlement of the southeastern plains of the New Mexico Territory. An early example of the bungalow form in New Mexico, the house is a vernacular expression built as a showpiece by a real estate developer, Charles J. Moore, in 1905 upon the founding of the town of Artesia. Erected by an itinerant building contractor, A. F. Martin, the house is a merging of that tendency in folk architecture to treat cobblestone as a complete wall covering, with holdovers of textural exuberance from the Queen Anne Style, and with the fashion of giving emphasis to natural materials such as cobblestone in the California Bungalow Style.

It has also been known as the S.S. Ward House.
