= Willie D. Atkeson House =

- U.S. National Register of Historic Places
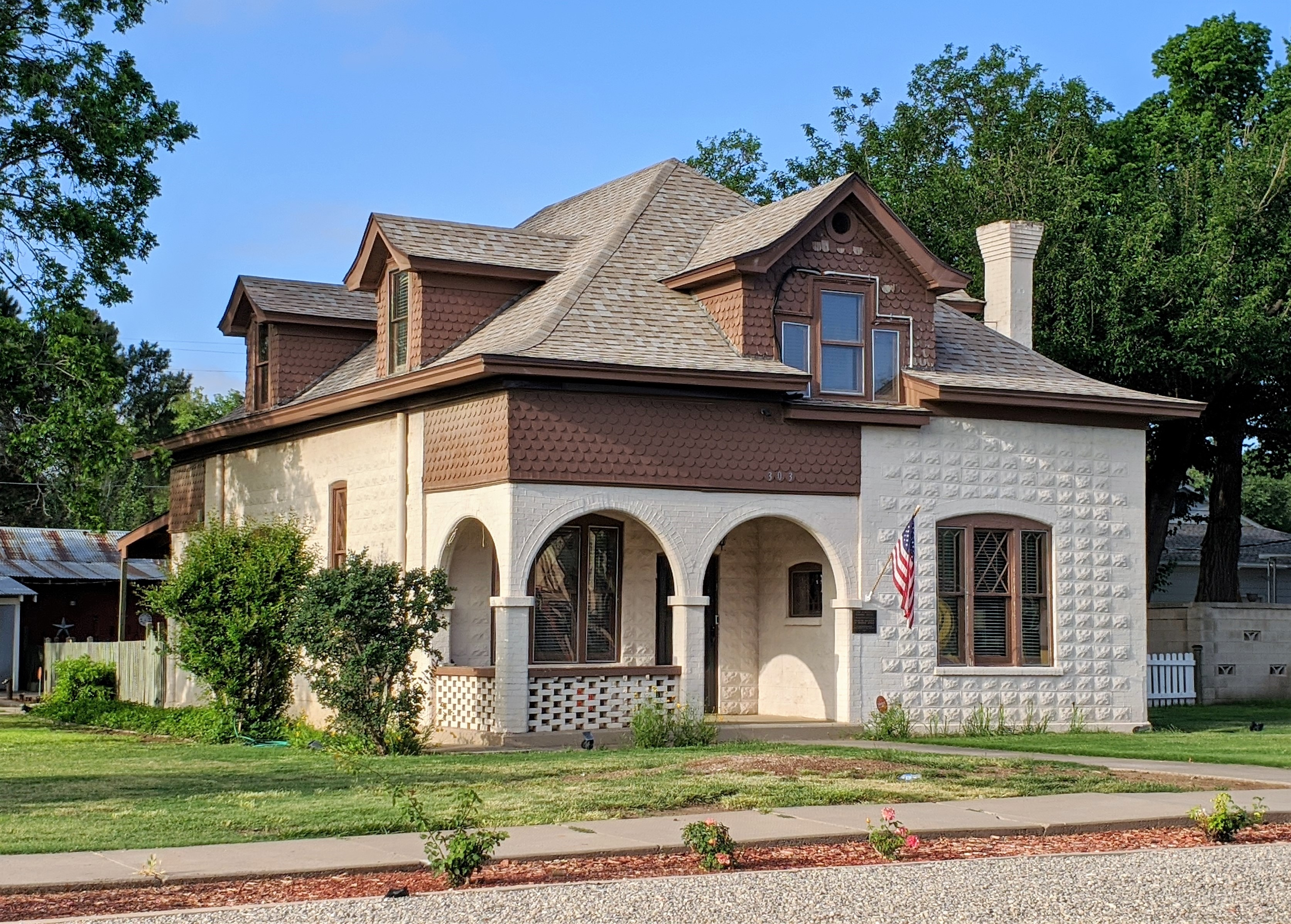

- Location within New Mexico
- Location: 303 W. Grand Ave., Artesia, New Mexico
- Coordinates: 32°50′19″N 104°23′52″W
- Area: less than one acre
- Built: 1904
- Architectural style: Queen Anne
- MPS: Artificial Stone Houses of Artesia TR
- NRHP reference No.: 84002894
- Added to NRHP: March 2, 1984

The Wilie D. Atkeson House, on W. Main St. in Artesia, New Mexico, was built in 1904. It was listed on the National Register of Historic Places in 1984.

It is one of ten houses of cast-stone construction which were together listed on the National Register in 1983.

It is a one-and-a-half-story hipped roof house, square in plan. It has "exceptional decorative use of cast concrete blocks reflecting the Queen Anne Style."
