= Abo Elementary School =

- Abo Elementary School and Fallout Shelter
- U.S. National Register of Historic Places
- NM State Register of Cultural Properties
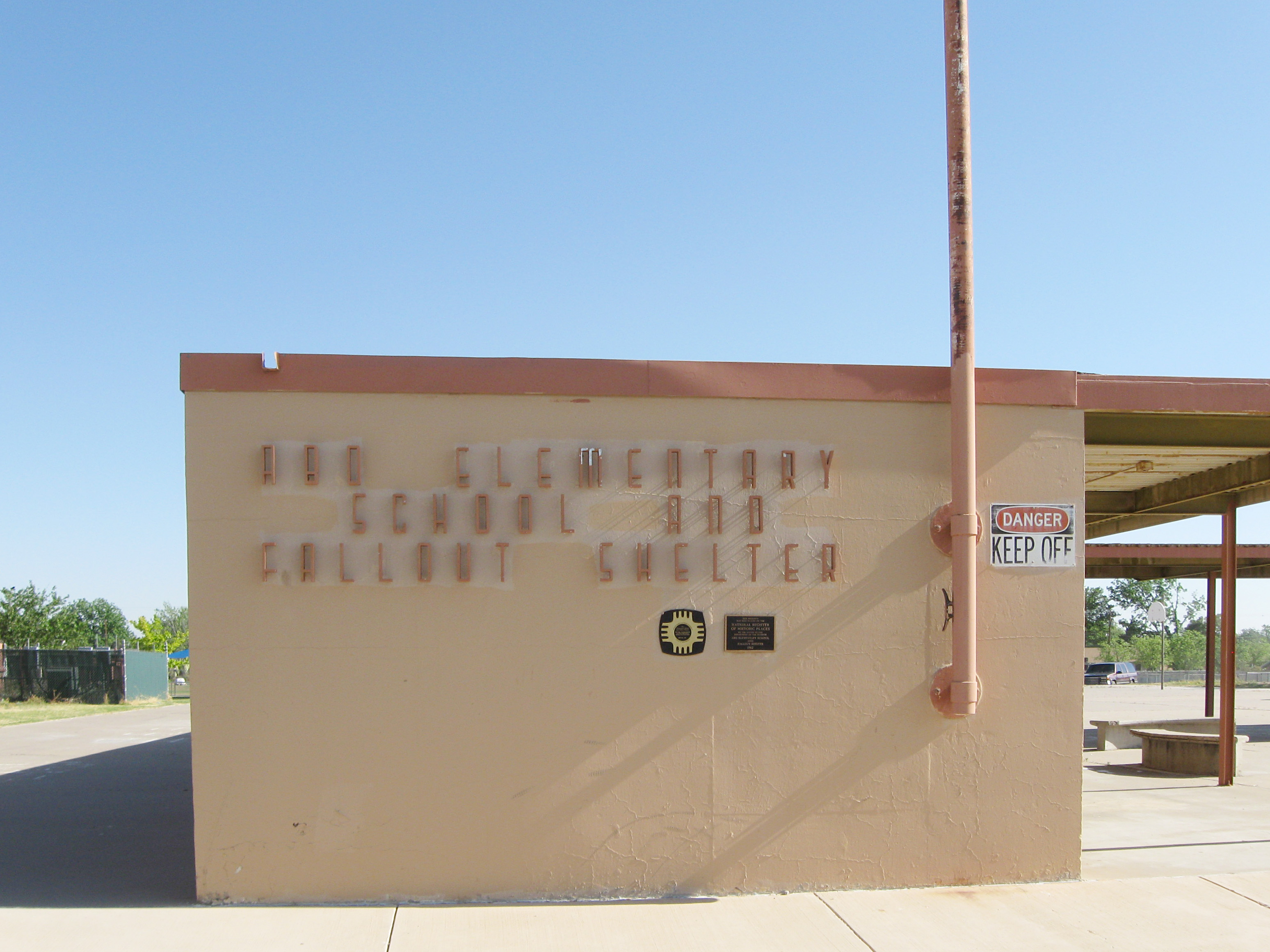
- Entrance structure to the school

- Location within New Mexico Location within the United States
- Location: 1802 Center Ave., Artesia, New Mexico
- Coordinates: 32°49′57″N 104°25′9″W
- Built: 1962
- Architect: Frank Standhart; W.R. Bauske & Co.
- Architectural style: Modern Movement
- NRHP reference No.: 99001171
- NMSRCP No.: 1781

Significant dates
- Added to NRHP: September 29, 1999
- Designated NMSRCP: July 16, 1999

Abo Elementary School in Artesia, New Mexico, United States, was the first public school in the United States constructed entirely underground and equipped to function as an advanced fallout shelter. Designed at the height of the Cold War and completed in 1962, the school had a concrete slab roof which doubled as the school's playground. It contained a large storage facility with room for emergency rations and supplies for up to 2,160 people in the event of nuclear warfare or other catastrophe. The building was listed on the National Register of Historic Places in 1999.

== Background ==
Abo Elementary School was built partly to further the development of American fallout shelter design and to further knowledge about the long-term effects of life underground in a shelter environment. The US civil defense film Duck and Cover was produced with students in mind, in the hopes that they would learn how, in the event of a nuclear blast, to be shielded from glass and blast waves using desks and chairs. However, educators, school administrators, and government officials soon realized that such measures would be inadequate, especially if a school received a direct hit from an atomic blast or was within the immediate blast radius of the weapon. One official argued that his school district was "in no position to guarantee physical protection ... from a thermonuclear explosion or radioactive fallout." Many state departments of education viewed the school shelter plans as "worthless". California's Department of Education, for example, was given designs intended to reduce radiation levels inside the school to 1/100 the level outdoors. These plans were rejected. When the California Department of Education then specified protection which would increase the protection factor to 1/1,000, it judged the costs to be too high, and the plans were rejected. Other departments of education and administrators rejected such plans because of their concern for the psychological well-being of their students, who, they believed, would be "constantly reminded of the possibility of a nuclear war" if kept in such a school for extended periods of time.

== Construction ==
Building the Abo Elementary School required that it be constructed with concrete reinforcing walls and a concrete outer shell to protect the inner parts of the school. To fulfill all requirements, Abo contained multiple drinking-water wells, a cafeteria, food storage, bedding and supplies for up to 2,160 people, air-filtration systems, an emergency power-generation system, decontamination systems, carpet, and a morgue.

Architect Frank Standhardt, in designing the school said, "I consider my profession derelict on civil defense. We've had ten years of grace and done nothing about it." Standhardt had built multiple aboveground windowless schools before Abo, believing them to positively influence pupils' ability to concentrate. He also cited reduced maintenance costs since there were no windows. Construction cost estimates were inconsistent: a Time magazine article (September 5, 1960) quotes Standhardt as estimating the costs at 10% above the cost of an average above-ground school, while Loretta Hall in Underground Buildings: More than Meets the Eye suggests a cost increase at 30 percent. Regardless, the U.S. Office of Civil Defense contributed the excess cost, assuming that it would benefit from any empirical testing performed on the students in the underground environment.

Standhardt designed the school in such a way as to make every element serve multiple purposes. To reduce cost of concrete, for example, the concrete shell roof of the school would double as a basketball court, and the drinking wells were designed to pump water into the air conditioning systems during peacetime. Two-way radio systems, Geiger counters, and fire fighting equipment were also built into the design.

== Cultural impact and criticism ==
Within Artesia, Abo Elementary School was lauded by teachers and many parents. Teachers often described Abo's students as less likely to cause trouble, more attentive, and less likely to require discipline. On the other hand, many of those same students described heightened awareness of the possibility of nuclear war, and some were terrified that they could be orphaned in the event of war. One of the most substantial fears raised by students involved the 2,160 person capacity of the school. In the event of a war, only the first 2,160 people would be allowed into the school for shelter, which would likely have left the majority of Artesia's nearly 12,000 residents, including the parents of some of Abo's students, without any shelter in the event of a nuclear attack.

Outside of Artesia, Abo Elementary School was condemned by many councils and groups, some of whom rejected the concept of an underground school entirely. Notwithstanding, the President of Artesia's Board of Education, C.P. Bunch, called the school "more a matter of insurance than fear", and expressed hope that future schools built in Artesia would follow its example. Federal studies concluded that the students suffered no long-term effects from their time in Abo, and many students who suffered from chronic allergies or asthma were transferred to Abo as its advanced air filtration systems reduced the impact of dust storms and allergens. Indeed, these studies concluded that many students' health improved as a result of extended time in the school.

== Closure ==
Abo Elementary School was shut down in 1995 as a result of increased maintenance costs, aging mechanical equipment and difficulties associated with removing asbestos insulation from the underground, windowless structure. A new school, Yeso Elementary School, was built next door and Abo was converted into a storage facility.

== See also ==
- National Register of Historic Places listings in Eddy County, New Mexico
