= Indian tribal police =

Police officers hired by Native Americans

Indian tribal police are police officers hired by Native American tribes. The largest tribal police agency is the Navajo Nation Police Department, the second largest is the Salt River Police Department near Scottsdale, Arizona. Following these are the law enforcement agencies of the 5 Civilized Nations, the Seminole Police Department and then Pine Ridge.

== History ==
In the early 1800s the Cherokee Nation established "regulating companies" with appointed regulators to combat horse theft and other crimes. In 1820 the Choctaw Lighthorse, a unit of mounted tribal policemen referred to as Lighthorsemen, named from American Revolutionary general "Light-horse Harry" Lee, was established with Federal funding under the Treaty of Doak's Stand. The Cherokee National Council formally established its first Lighthorse company on November 18, 1844. The Creek and Seminole tribes also established lighthorses before the "Five Civilized Tribes" lost their lands in the 19th century at which time their lighthorses were disbanded.

In 1869 the US Indian Agent to the Sac and Fox and Iowa Tribes appointed American Indians as policemen. This is the first record of a federally sponsored Indian police force and was the first of the Indian Agency Police. Indian Agency Police were tasked with the enforcement of federal laws, treaty regulations, and law and order on Indian agency land. At the time very few tribes had tribal government, and therefore no tribal laws or police forces, thus the Indian Agents and their officers were often the only form of law enforcement in Indian Country.

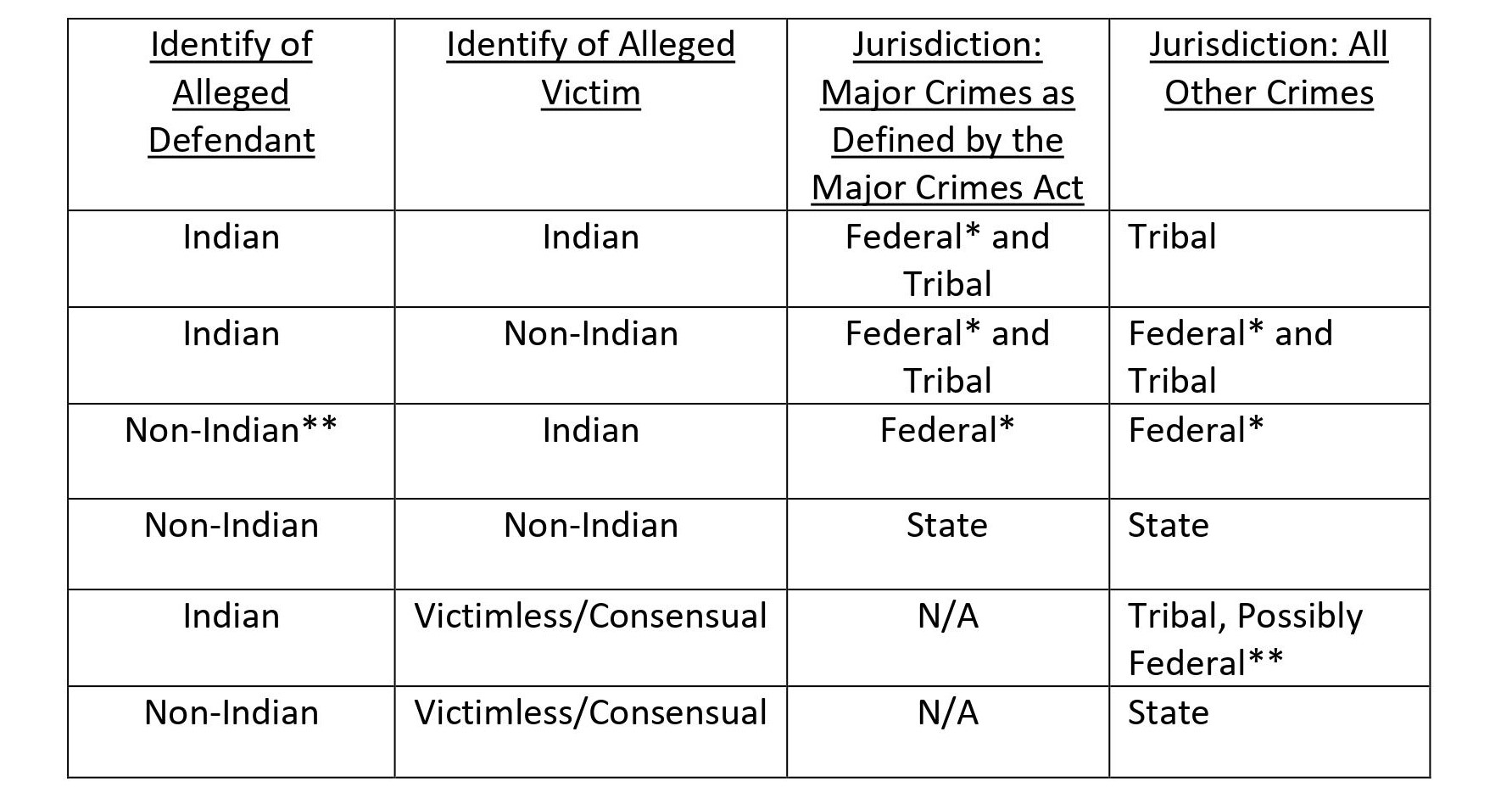

== Description ==
Tribal police historically had several different titles—sheriffs, constables, regulators, lighthorsemen —and today work closely with local, state, and federal police agencies.

== Line of duty deaths ==
As of 2025, a total of 79 officers and 1 K9 of the tribal police have been killed in the line of duty.

== See also ==
- Aboriginal Police in Canada
- Bureau of Indian Affairs Police
- Indian agency police
- United States Indian Police
