= Mauldin-Hall House =

- U.S. National Register of Historic Places
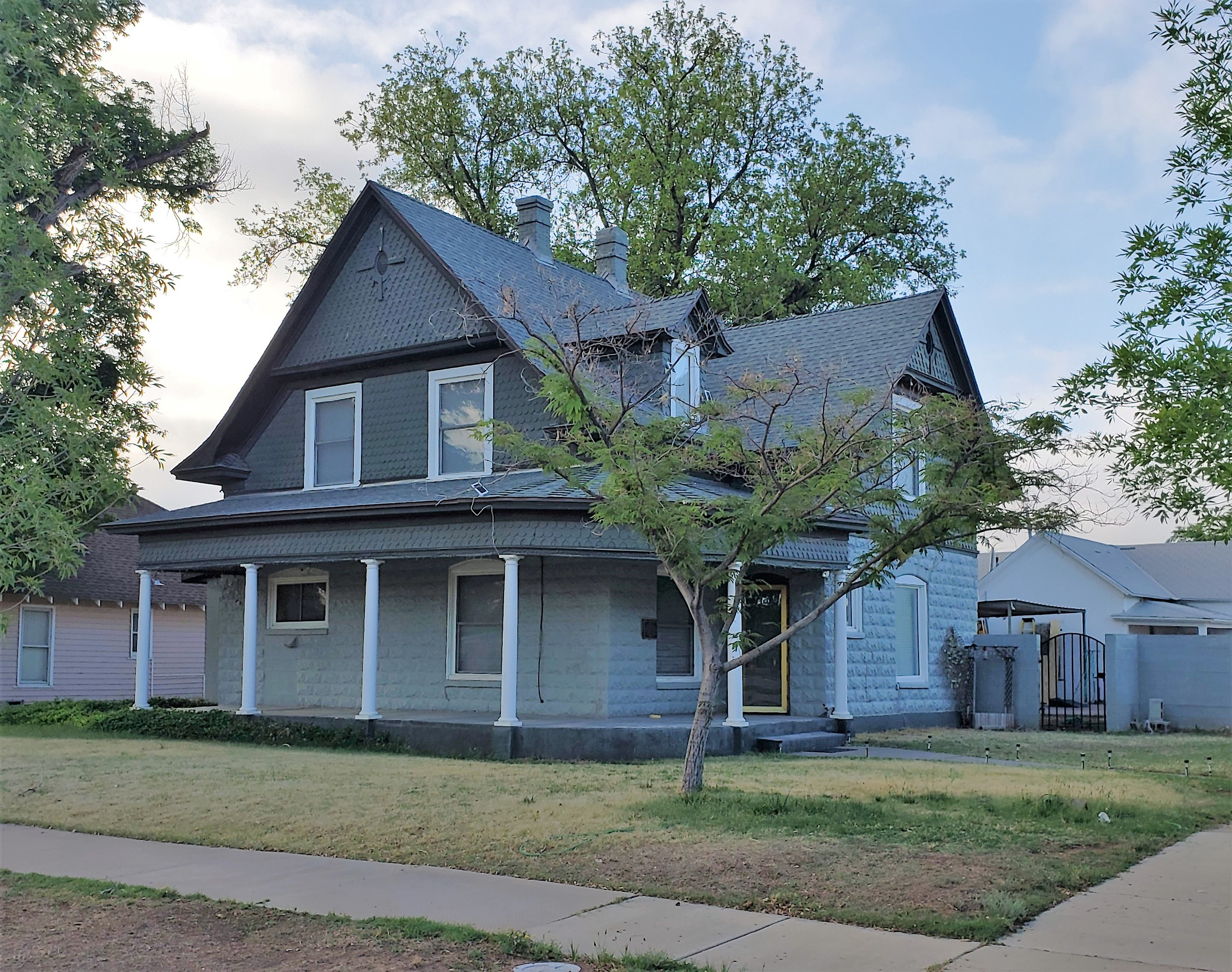

- Location within New Mexico
- Location: 501 S. Roselawn Ave., Artesia, New Mexico
- Coordinates: 32°50′16″N 104°23′56″W
- Area: less than one acre
- Built: 1909
- Architectural style: Queen Anne
- MPS: Artificial Stone Houses of Artesia TR
- NRHP reference No.: 84002930
- Added to NRHP: March 2, 1984

The Mauldin-Hall House, at 501 S. Roselawn Ave. in Artesia, New Mexico, was built in 1909. It was listed on the National Register of Historic Places in 1984.

It is a one-and-a-half-story L-shaped house with elements of Queen Anne style. It was built of artificial stone.
