= Hodges-Runyan-Brainard House =

Historic house in New Mexico, United States

- U.S. National Register of Historic Places
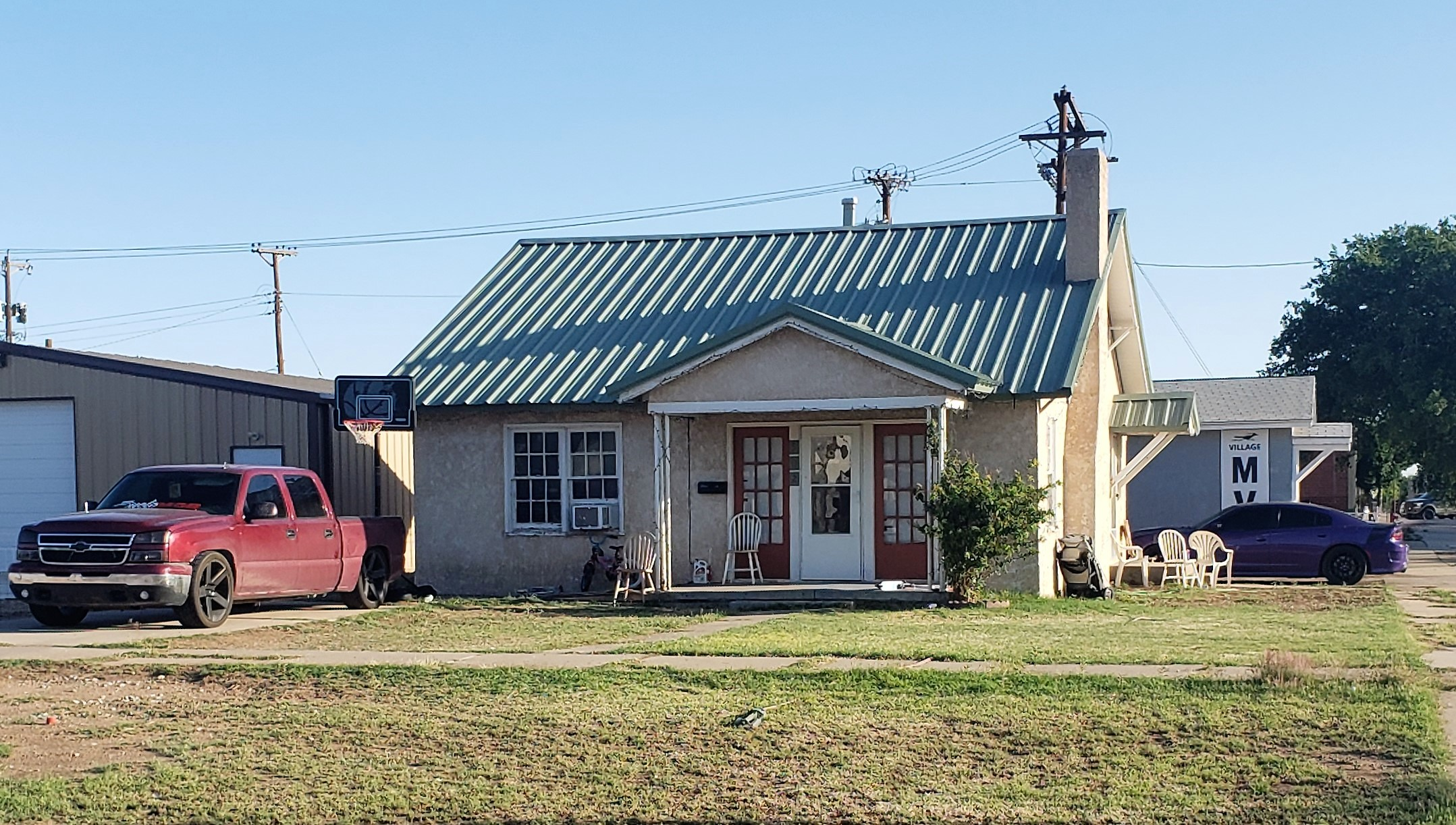

- Location within New Mexico
- Location: 504 West Quay Avenue, Artesia, New Mexico
- Coordinates: 32°50′29″N 104°24′09″W
- Area: less than one acre
- Built: 1904
- MPS: Artificial Stone Houses of Artesia TR
- NRHP reference No.: 84002925
- Added to NRHP: March 2, 1984

The Hodges-Runyan-Brainard House is a historic house in Artesia, New Mexico. It was built in 1904 for John Hodges, a real estate developer who used artificial stone to build many houses in Artesia. The house was purchased by rancher David W. Runyan in 1916. Two years later, his daughter Mary moved in with her husband, Reed Brainard. It has been listed on the National Register of Historic Places since March 2, 1984.

The Hodges-Sipple House, another listed house in Artesia, was also built for John Hodges.
