= Carlsbad Irrigation District =

Historic district in New Mexico, United States

- U.S. National Register of Historic Places
- U.S. National Historic Landmark District
- NM State Register of Cultural Properties
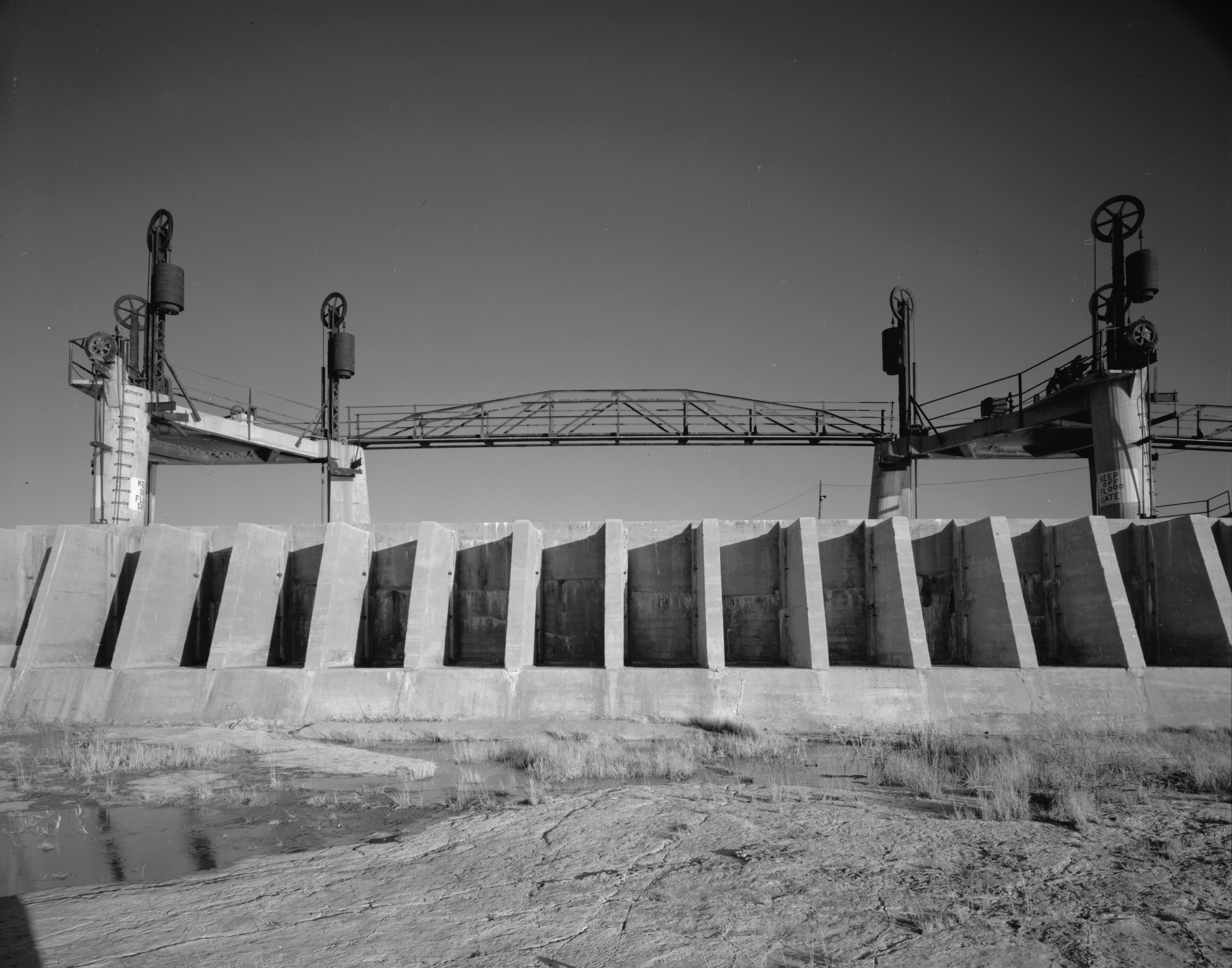
- Avalon Dam on the Pecos River

- Location within New Mexico Location within the United States
- Nearest city: Carlsbad, New Mexico
- Coordinates: 32.4919°N 104.2524°W
- Area: 5,464 acres (22.11 km^{2})
- Built: 1887
- NRHP reference No.: 66000476
- NMSRCP No.: 7

Significant dates
- Added to NRHP: October 15, 1966
- Designated NHLD: July 19, 1964

The Carlsbad Irrigation District, also known as Carlsbad Reclamation Project or Irrigation system of the Pecos Irrigation and Improvement Company, is a major early water reclamation project located near Carlsbad in southeastern New Mexico. Begun in the 1880s, it is now managed by the United States Bureau of Reclamation, and provides irrigation water to a large area around Carlsbad, diverted from the Pecos River and the Black River. The late 19th and early 20th-century elements of the project were designated a National Historic Landmark District in 1964.

== History and description ==
The city of Carlsbad is located in the northern reaches of the Chihuahuan Desert. In order to work this area agriculturally settlers arriving in the late 19th century turned to irrigation to provide water for their crops. By the late 1880s, this resulted in a patchwork of private canals irrigating small patches of land. Charles B. Eddy and Pat Garrett, two local ranchers and businessmen, hatched the idea of a larger and more organized corporate-run irrigation system to serve the entire lower Pecos River valley. The project got underway in 1889, when construction began on the Avalon Dam, which now serves as a diversion and regulation point for the system. In 1893 the Avalon Dam had to be rebuilt after its destruction in a flash flood, and the McMillan Dam was built further upriver as a major storage facility. The Avalon Dam was once again destroyed by flooding in 1903, sending the system into effective bankruptcy. It was then taken over by the United States Bureau of Reclamation, which completed reconstruction of the Avalon Dam in 1907, and has overseen the project since. The Carlsbad Irrigation District was founded in 1932 and assumed operations of the project in 1949. The system has since then been augmented by the Brantley Dam, which now serves as its primary storage, and a dam on the Black River near Malaga that provides additional capacity in that area.

In addition to the two major dams, the district manages the major canals that distribute water to users, and the various gatehouses that control water flow. Its offices are located in the First Bank of Eddy building in downtown Carlsbad.

== See also ==
- National Register of Historic Places listings in Eddy County, New Mexico
- List of National Historic Landmarks in New Mexico
