= Robert Weems and Mary E. Tansill House =

Historic house in New Mexico, United States

- Rober Weems and Mary E. Tansill House
- U.S. National Register of Historic Places
- Location within New Mexico
- Location: 1612 North Guadalupe Street, Carlsbad, New Mexico
- Coordinates: 32°26′57″N 104°13′53″W
- Area: 1.8 acres (0.73 ha)
- Built: 1898
- Built by: William H. Ellice and Ernest H. Every
- NRHP reference No.: 02001111
- Added to NRHP: October 10, 2002

The Robert Weems and Mary E. Tansill House is a historic house in La Huerta, a suburb of Carlsbad, New Mexico. It was built in 1898 for Robert Weems Tansill and his wife, Mary Elizabeth Motter. Tansill was the son of Colonel Robert Tansill, a veteran of the Mexican–American War who had served in the Confederate States Army during the American Civil War. He founded Tansill's Punch 5 Cent Cigar in Chicago, and he became a multi-millionaire. He eventually moved to Eddy County, New Mexico, where he invested heavily in the area. He died on the morning of December 29, 1902 in his home. His widow sold the house to John Green Ussery in 1906, and she died in Chicago in 1939. The house has been listed on the National Register of Historic Places since October 10, 2002.
