= Hodges-Sipple House =

Historic house in New Mexico, United States

- U.S. National Register of Historic Places
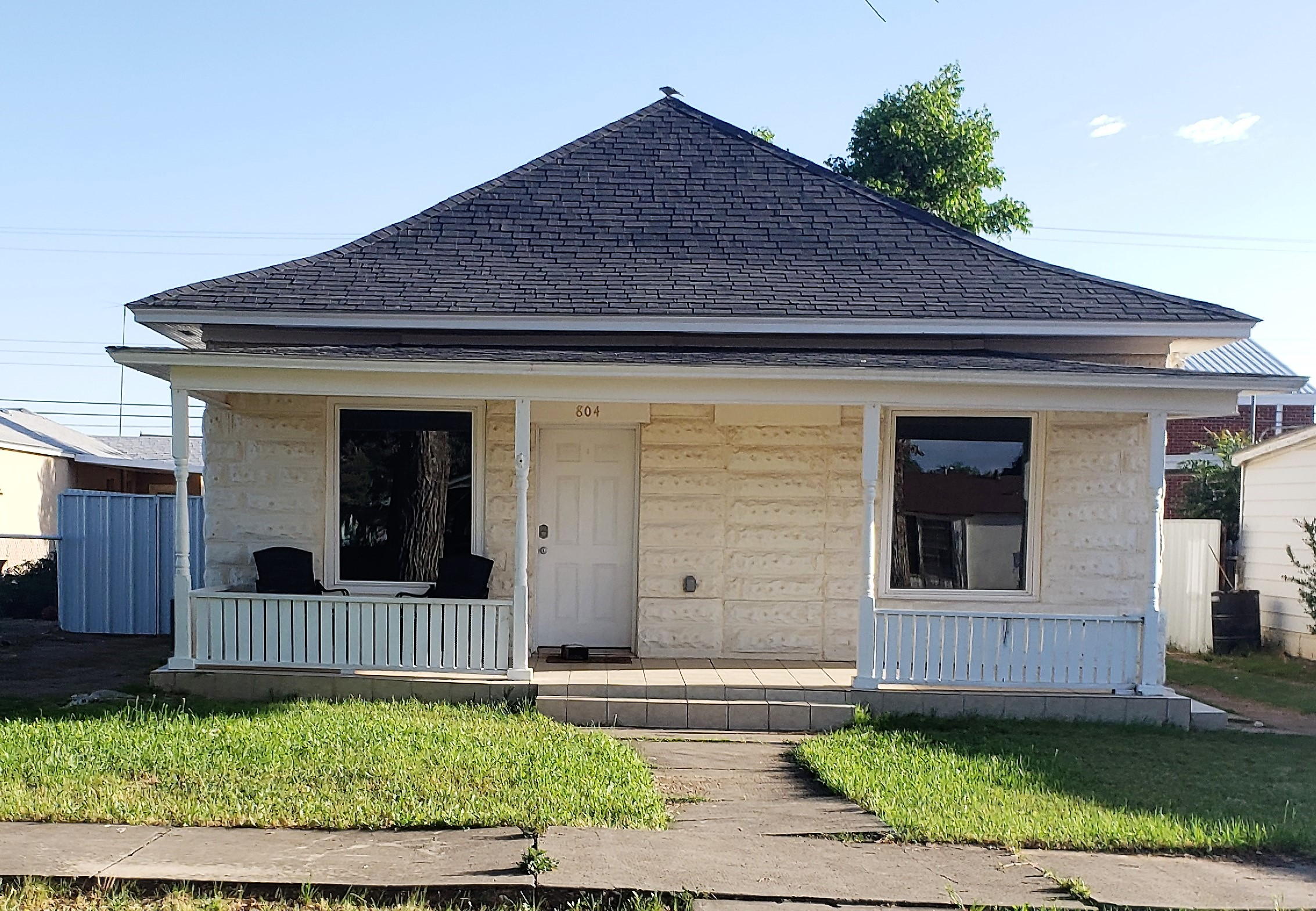

- Location within New Mexico
- Location: 804 West Missouri Avenue, Artesia, New Mexico
- Coordinates: 32°50′17″N 104°24′22″W
- Area: less than one acre
- Built: 1905
- MPS: Artificial Stone Houses of Artesia TR
- NRHP reference No.: 84002926
- Added to NRHP: March 2, 1984

The Hodges-Sipple House is a historic house in Artesia, New Mexico. It was built in 1905 for John R. Hodges, the secretary and treasurer of the Artesia Improvement Company, a real estate development company, and the head of the Hollow Stone Manufacturing Company, an artificial stone company. The house was purchased by William Sipple, a real estate developer, in 1909. It has been listed on the National Register of Historic Places since March 2, 1984.

The Hodges-Runyan-Brainard House, another listed house in Artesia, was also built for John Hodges.
