= John Acord House =

- U.S. National Register of Historic Places
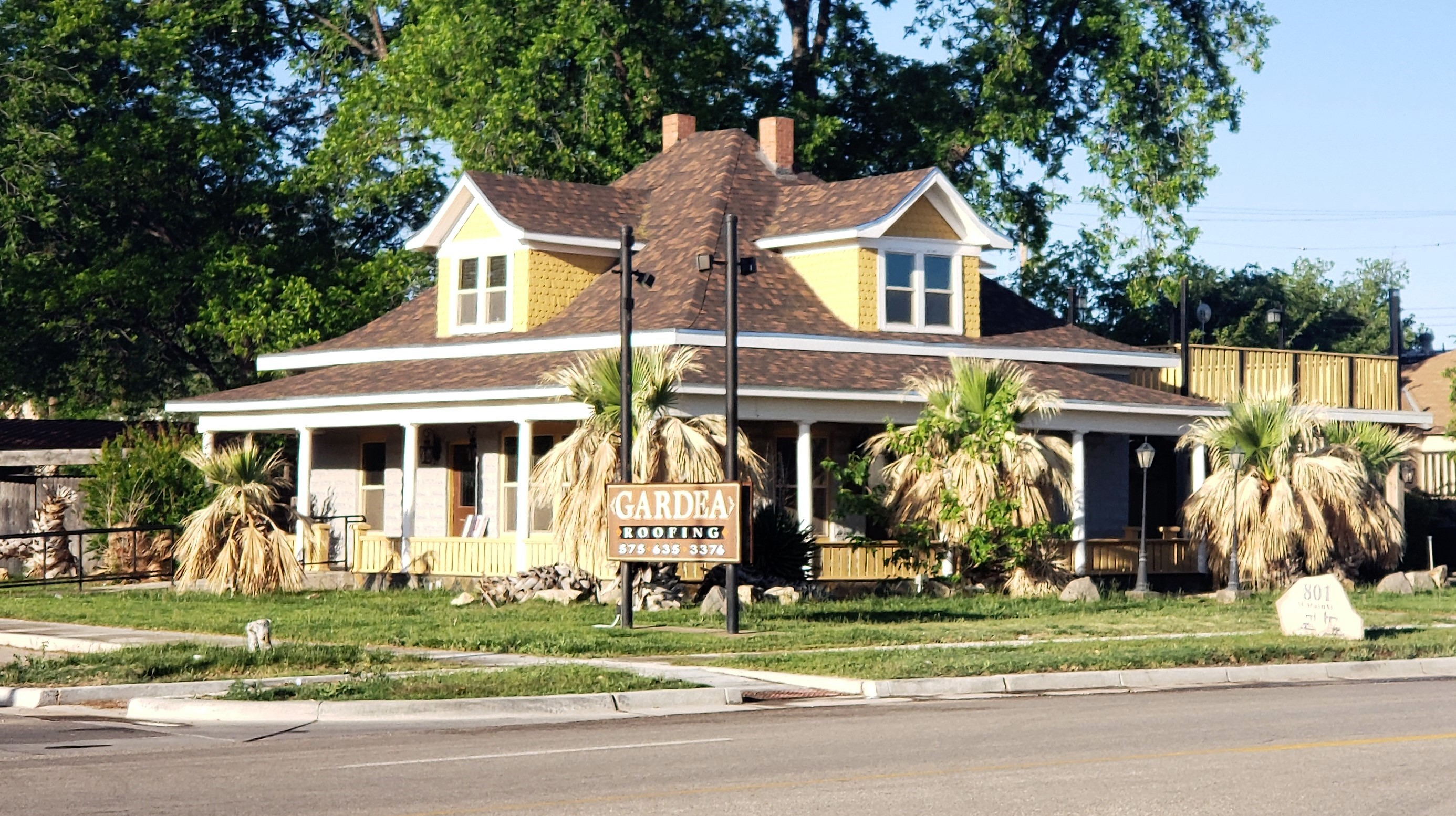

- Location within New Mexico
- Location: W. Main St., Artesia, New Mexico
- Coordinates: 32°50′31″N 104°24′21″W
- Area: less than one acre
- Built: 1908
- Architectural style: Queen Anne
- MPS: Artificial Stone Houses of Artesia TR
- NRHP reference No.: 84002891
- Added to NRHP: March 2, 1984

The John Acord House, on W. Main St. in Artesia, New Mexico, was built in 1908. It was listed on the National Register of Historic Places in 1984.

It is one of ten houses of cast-stone construction which were together listed on the National Register in 1983.

It is Queen Anne in style.
