= Hodgson House =

Hodgson House may refer to:

in the United States

(sorted by state, then city/town)

- Richard and Geraldine Hodgson House, New Canaan, Connecticut, listed on the National Register of Historic Places (NRHP) in Fairfield County
- W. B. Hodgson Hall, Savannah, Georgia, listed on the NRHP in Chatham County
- Asbury and Sallie Hodgson House, Dillard, Georgia, listed on the NRHP in Rabun County
- William Hodgson Two-Family House, Southbridge, Massachusetts, listed on the NRHP in Worcester County, Massachusetts
- Hodgson House (Kalispell, Montana), listed on the NRHP in Flathead County
- E. F. Hodgson Company Early US manufacturer of "kit" Pre-fab houses

== See also ==
- Hodgson-Aid Mill, Sycamore, Missouri, listed on the NRHP in Ozark County, Missouri
