= Baskin Building =

- U.S. National Register of Historic Places
- Location within New Mexico
- Location: 332 W. Main St., Artesia, New Mexico
- Coordinates: 32°50′33″N 104°24′01″W
- Area: less than one acre
- Built: 1904-05
- Built by: Denning, S.P.
- Architectural style: Early Commercial
- NRHP reference No.: 90000599
- Added to NRHP: July 18, 1990

The Baskin Building, at 332 W. Main St. in Artesia, New Mexico, was built in 1904–05. It was listed on the National Register of Historic Places in 1990.

It is a two-story building which was designed to serve as a combination of functions, including as a hotel.
