= William Hodgson Two-Family House =

Historic house in Massachusetts, United States

- U.S. National Register of Historic Places
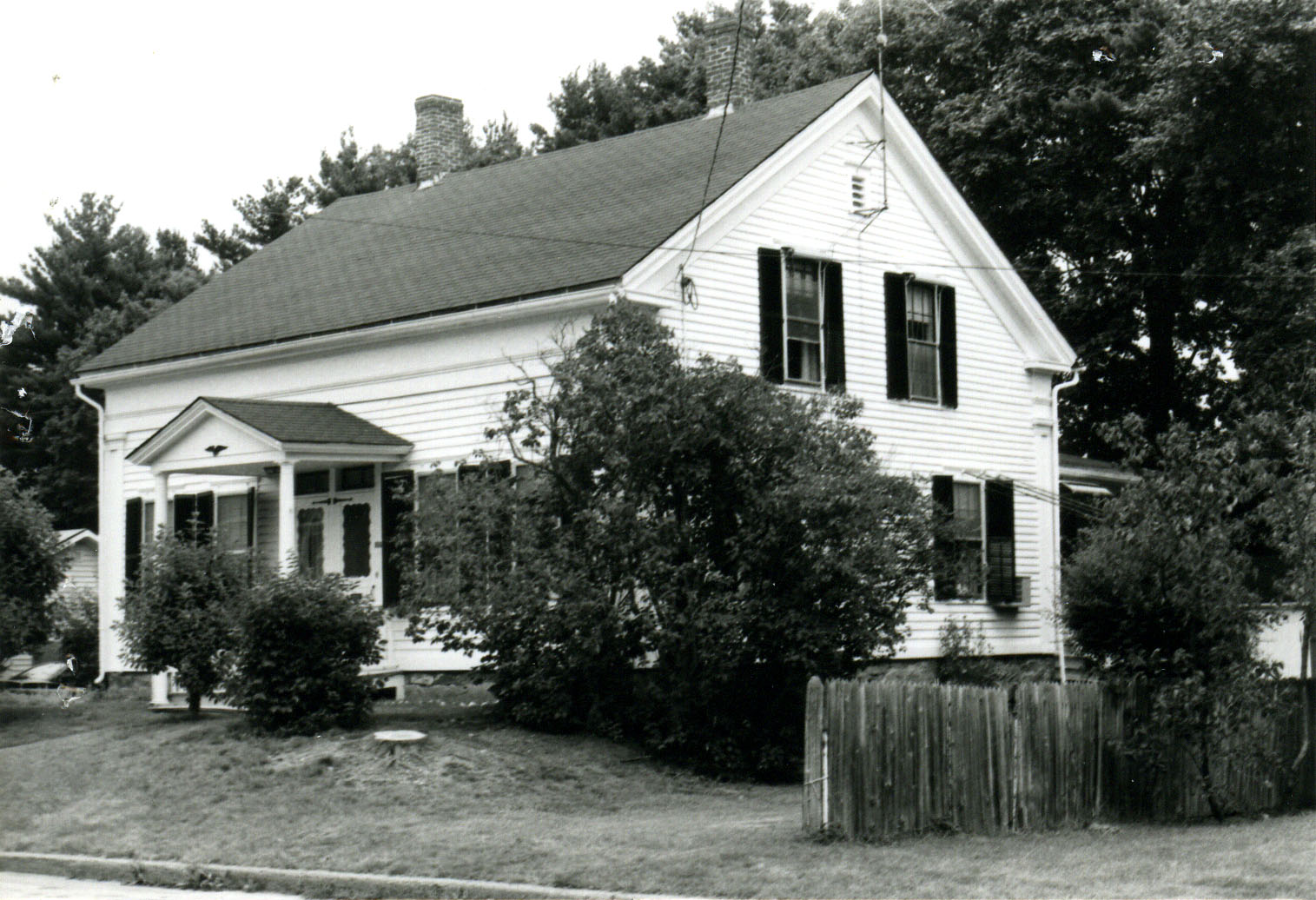
- c. 1986 photo

- Location within Massachusetts Location within the United States
- Location: 103-105 Sayles St., Southbridge, Massachusetts
- Coordinates: 42°4′38″N 72°2′38″W
- Area: less than one acre
- Built: 1855
- Architectural style: Greek Revival
- MPS: Southbridge MRA
- NRHP reference No.: 89000578
- Added to NRHP: June 22, 1989

The William Hodgson Two-Family House is or was a historic house at 103-105 Sayles Street in Southbridge, Massachusetts. The 1 1/2-story Greek Revival duplex was built sometime between 1855 and 1870. At the time of its listing on the National Register of Historic Places in 1989, it was one of two well-preserved multifamily houses of the period on Sayles Street. It had a five-bay front facade with projecting gabled porch sheltering the two entrances, corner pilasters, and a frieze across the top of the front, below the gabled roof. It appears to have been demolished to make way for expansion of the nearby hospital grounds.

== See also ==
- National Register of Historic Places listings in Southbridge, Massachusetts
- National Register of Historic Places listings in Worcester County, Massachusetts
