= Queen, New Mexico =

Unincorporated community in New Mexico, United States

- Unincorporated community
- Location within the state of New Mexico Queen (the United States)
- Coordinates: 32°11′27″N 104°44′45″W
- Country: United States
- State: New Mexico
- County: Eddy
- Elevation: 5,843 ft (1,781 m)
- Time zone: UTC-7 (Mountain (MST))
  - Summer (DST): UTC-6 (MDT)
- ZIP codes: 88220
- Area code: 575
- GNIS feature ID: 909922

Queen is an unincorporated community in Eddy County in southeastern New Mexico, in the southwestern United States. Although it currently has a population of around 50, it was formerly considered a ghost town. Located in the foothills on the east side of the Guadalupe Mountains, in the southern Lincoln National Forest, it flourished in the early 20th century as a ranching center. Queen is located alongside NM Route 137, about 27 mi (50 mi by road) southwest of Carlsbad.

== History ==
The area was originally settled by the agricultural and hunter gatherer Jornada Mogollon people about 200 CE whose suzerainty ended with the influx of the Apache and other plains raiders around 1450. Two Mogollon archaeological sites are located in Queen, Archeological Site No. AR 03-08-03-195 and Archeological Site No. AR-03-08-03-232.

The recent community was founded in 1905 by entrepreneur J. W. Tulk who contracted with the local Queen Ranch (now Womack ranch) for water and land, and built a store and negotiated for a post office. As part of the bargain, the town was named Queen. The post office lasted from 1905 until 1920, when ranching in the area had declined. For a while the only landmark was a single chimney, but the community began to repopulate in the late 20th century.

== Attractions ==
Near the center of the community is the ten foot stone memorial to Frank A. Kindel, The Flying Paper Boy Of The Guadalupes, a pilot who crashed here in 1964. Nearby is the Last Chance Canyon Apache/Cavalry Battle Site, a New Mexico Registered Cultural Property. Sitting Bull Falls is a popular day hike and an attractive picnic spot.

Dog Canyon Campground, a part of Guadalupe Mountains National Park, is 20 miles southwest at the end of NM Highway 137.

== Economy ==
As of 2008 there is no gas station in Queen.
