= First National Bank of Eddy =

- U.S. National Register of Historic Places
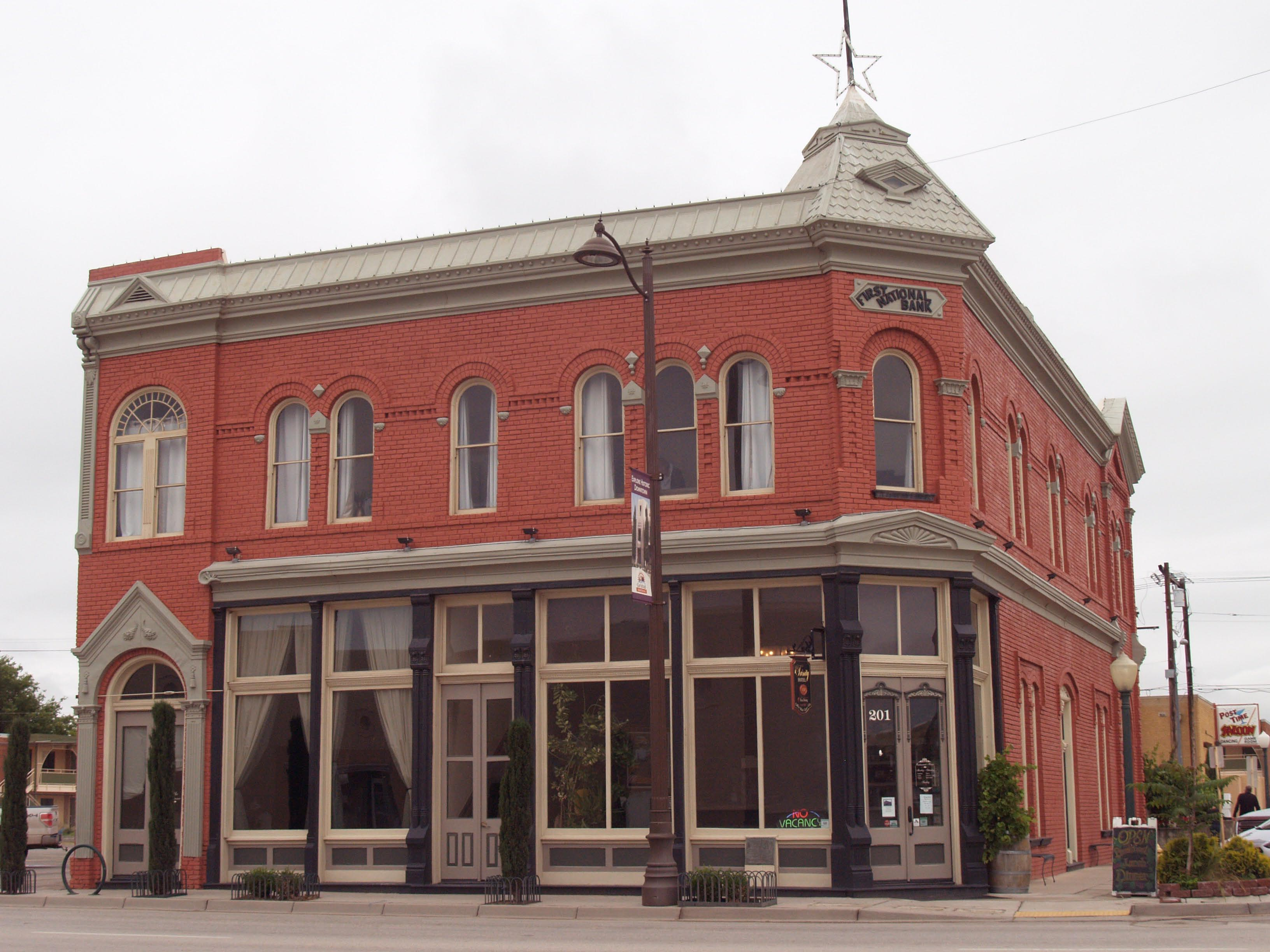
- The building in 2015

- Location within New Mexico
- Location: 303 West Fox Street, Carlsbad, New Mexico
- Coordinates: 32°25′08″N 104°13′44″W
- Area: 0.2 acres (0.081 ha)
- Built: 1890
- Built by: Caples & Hammer
- Architect: Ernest Krause
- Architectural style: Late Victorian
- NRHP reference No.: 76001196
- Added to NRHP: December 12, 1976

The First National Bank of Eddy is a historic building in Carlsbad, New Mexico. It was built by Caples and Hammer, a construction firm from El Paso, Texas, for the First National Bank of Eddy in 1890. Its chairman, Charles B. Eddy, was the town's namesake until it was changed to Carlsbad. The building was designed in the Late Victorian style by Ernest Krause, an architect from El Paso, Texas. It has been listed on the National Register of Historic Places since December 12, 1976.
