= Eugene Wilson Hodges Farm =

Historic house in North Carolina, United States

- U.S. National Register of Historic Places
- U.S. Historic district
- Location within North Carolina Location within the United States
- Location: 3900 Rocky River Church Rd., near Charlotte, North Carolina
- Coordinates: 35°16′21″N 80°42′17″W
- Area: 187 acres (76 ha)
- Built: 1908
- Built by: Hodges, Eugene Wilson
- Architectural style: Colonial Revival, Vernacular Colonial Revival
- MPS: Rural Mecklenburg County MPS
- NRHP reference No.: 91000077
- Added to NRHP: February 21, 1991

Eugene Wilson Hodges Farm is a historic home, farm, and national historic district located near Charlotte, Mecklenburg County, North Carolina. The district encompasses four contributing buildings, one contributing site, and five contributing structures in rural Mecklenburg County. The Eugene Wilson Hodges House was built about 1908, and is a two-story, three-bay I-house with two parallel one-story rear ells. It has a slate triple-A roof and two exterior, stuccoed-brick chimneys. It features a vernacular Colonial Revival hip roofed wraparound front porch with Doric order columns. Other contributing resources include two chicken coops (c. 1930), a wellhouse (c. 1908), barn (c. 1935), two granaries (c. 1930), two silos (c. 1935), and the agricultural landscape.

It was added to the National Register of Historic Places in 1991.
