= Indian agency police =

US policemen enforcing federal laws on natives

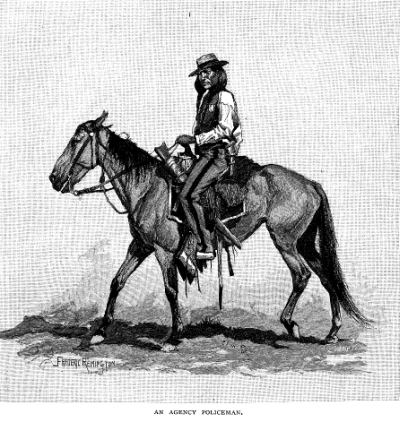
A Southern Cheyenne Indian policeman, c. 1889

The Indian agency police was a group of non-Indigenous people responsible for the implementation of government policy on Indigenous reserves. They operated in various parts of the United States of America and Canada.

== Historical context ==
Throughout American history there has been great mistreatment of Indigenous people in the country. This mistreatment has taken a variety of forms, including neglect, government control and anti-Indigenous legislation. Forced removal from ancestral lands onto reserves has also been a major part of Indigenous history in America, along with fighting and killing that stemmed from resistance of oppressive forces. Assimilation has also been extremely impactful for Indigenous peoples and the Indian agency police was one way the American government enforced and aided assimilation.

== About ==
The Indian agency police was one extremely significant example of attempted assimilation in American history. The Indian agency police spanned across multiple centuries and was carried out by Indian agents both in the United States of America and in Canada. Their role first came into existence in the 1930’s when they were placed in Cherokee land and over the years over fifty different police agencies were formed. At first the agency was not greatly funded by the federal government, but as they progressed they received more funding for uniforms and weapons for their agents. However, the roles of agents in the two nations varied greatly. In the United States agents were placed on reserves to enforce and represent the government policies regarding Indigenous peoples. Every group of Indian agents had a superintendent who was essentially a supervisor of all the officers and some of the agents in groups were able to carry firearms. They were supposed to be responsible for fostering wellbeing for Indigenous people through security and other various methods that integrated with daily life. However, agents were also placed on reserve in an effort to “acculturate,” or assimilate, Indigenous people to the growing American culture. Not all of the assimilation attempts were inherently mal-intended with some agents believing what they were doing was truly the right thing, believing that Indigenous people could only survive by “becoming Christian farmers who made a living on their own pieces of private property.” This was not the case for all agents, though and many attempts of assimilation were intentional and targeted at the various aspects of Indigenous life.

== Political implications ==
One major part of Indigenous life that was affected by the Indian agency police was the political systems of Indigenous people. For many years Indigenous groups in North America chose self-governance as their political system, but as American continued to grow the push for assimilation debated whether or not this was the way that Indigenous people should continue to live. The Indian agency police seemed to have thought that self-governance was perhaps not the correct way to govern, and through their assimilation attempts suppressed the traditional political systems of Indigenous people in America, trying to lead it towards mainstream American politics. In addition, to the assimilation of traditional Indigenous governance, the Indian agency police also murdered crucial leaders in Indigenous communities.

=== Sitting Bull ===
Sitting Bull was a highly influential Indigenous leader who was greatly opposed to assimilation and the erasure of Indigenous self-governance, and he was murdered by the Indian agency police at his home following his attempted arrest for his actions against government interest. Sitting Bull was supposed to be arrested due to his involvement in religious practices the government did not approve of, but Major James McLaughlin, part of the Indian agency police, stated in a letter that agents "must not let him escape under any circumstances." Knowing that Sitting Bull was a great enemy of McLaughlin and that McLaughlin was looking for a way to justify Sitting Bull’s arrest, makes the justification given an interesting added perspective to this narrative. In addition to the political impact that the Indian agency police had on Indigenous people, many social impacts followed.

== Relationship between groups ==
At the time that the Indian agency police existed, attitudes towards Indigenous people were quite negative and they were often portrayed as uncivilized and lesser. This obviously reflected in the actions of the Indian agency police, but the actions were not truly necessary to have happened. Valentine T. McGillycuddy was an Indian agent at Pine Ridge Reservation in 1879, and contrary to many of his peers McGillycuddly was able to be “highly thought of by both whites and Indians during his administration of the Pine Ridge agency,” showcasing that Indigenous people were indeed not difficult to get along with it was rather the agents and government policy that thought of them that way.

== Social implications ==
=== Residential schools ===
Assimilation has been a present issue for many groups throughout American history, but it has been highly prevalent in Indigenous history and the Indian agency police and Indian agents played a major part in this forced assimilation. The United States of America had Native American Boarding Schools for many years that were used to attempt to assimilate Indigenous children into mainstream American culture. These schools were also intended to convert children to Christianity and had a mandatory attendance for all Indigenous children. Punishment and discipline within the schools was extremely rigid and abuse was common in the schools, which resulted in many deaths within the system. Agents were responsible for removing children from their communities and placing them in boarding schools to fill the system. Many Indigenous communities resisted sending their children off through a variety of forms but were ultimately met with pushback from the Indian agency police. As a result of resisting the boarding school system, Indian agents would restrict the rations and supplies that Indigenous communities were receiving. Within the schools that children were eventually taken to they were stripped of their culture, which was also happening within reserves themselves due to the Indian agency police.

=== Additional assimilation ===
The agents of the Indian agency police impacted the religious practices and social roles of Indigenous people. In the residential schools, agents forced children into traditional western gender roles with male students learning manual labour skills and female students learning house-keeping skills. Even when the Indian agency police system ended other professionals, such as doctors and teachers replaced them to continue to make assimilation attempts towards Indigenous people. Overall, the existence of the Indian agency police has had a major impact on the social wellbeing of Indigenous people through the erasure and rewriting of their cultures.

In general the Indian agency police had major impacts on the social, political and cultural wellbeing of Indigenous people through the enforcement of assimilative and inequitable government made policies.

== See also ==
- Cultural assimilation of Native Americans
- Indian agent
- American Indian boarding schools
- Sitting Bull
- Native American civil rights
- Bureau of Indian Affairs Police
