= Bureau of Indian Affairs Police =

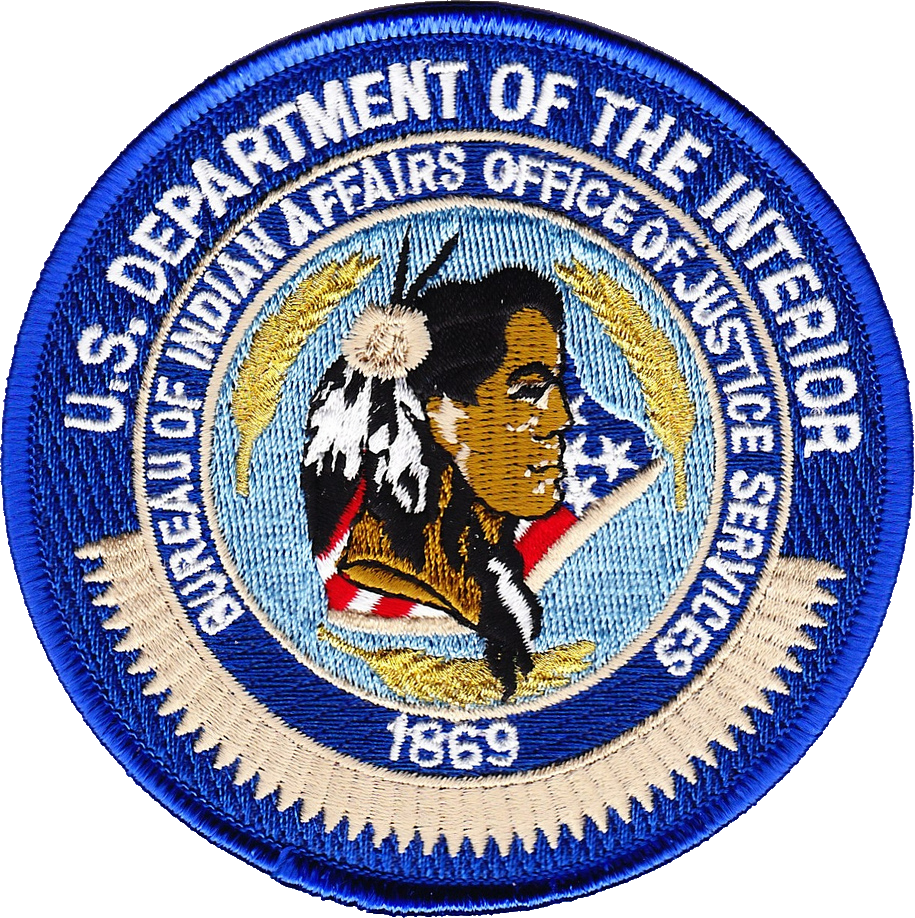
- BIA Police patch

- Seal of the BIA

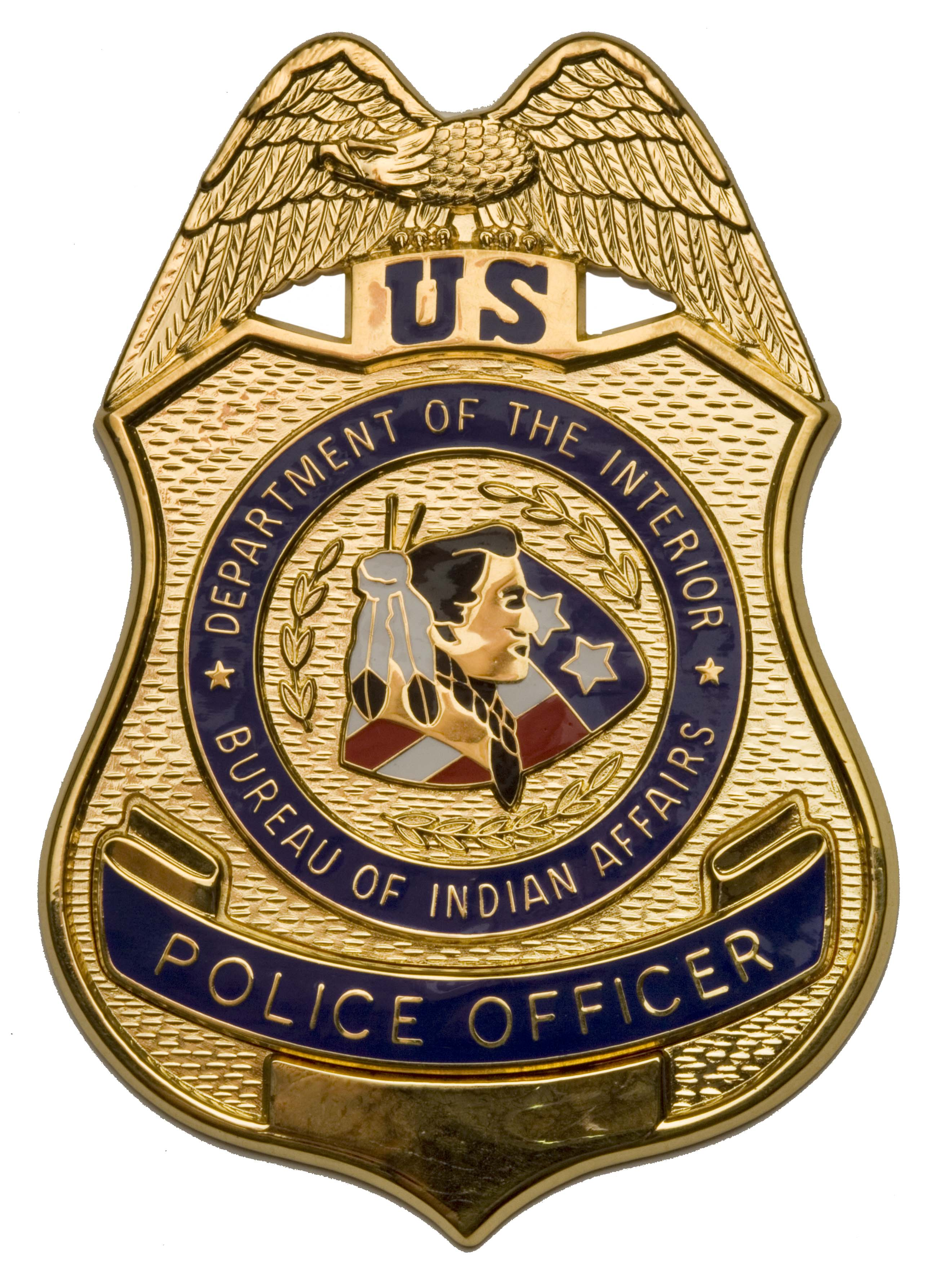
- BIA Police badge

- Flag of the BIA
- Common name: BIA Police
- Abbreviation: BIAP

Jurisdictional structure
- Operations jurisdiction: U.S.

The Bureau of Indian Affairs Police, Office of Justice Services (BIA or BIA-OJS), also known as BIA Police, is the law enforcement arm of the United States Bureau of Indian Affairs. The BIA's official mission is to "uphold the constitutional sovereignty of the federally recognized tribes and preserve peace within Indian country". It provides police, investigative, corrections, technical assistance, and court services across the over 567 registered Indian tribes and reservations, especially those lacking their own police force; additionally, it oversees tribal police organizations. BIA services are provided through the Office of Justice Services Division of Law Enforcement.

In 2004 the agency employed 320 officers.

BIA Police are federal police officers who enforce all federal laws relating to Indian country, including Title 16 (conservation) Title 18 (criminal law and procedure) and Title 21 (food and drugs) of the United States Code, as well as the Code of Federal Regulations. The BIA has nationwide jurisdiction over crimes committed within or involving Indian Country, and its officers are usually based near Indian reservations. BIA Police officers may enforce tribal law if deputized by the tribe or provided for by tribal ordinance or statute. They may also be granted authority to enforce state laws by state statute.

The BIA has hiring preferences for Native Americans, but will hire non members who have the proper qualifications or educational requirements.

== Operations ==
The Division of Operations consists of six regional districts with 208 bureau and tribal law enforcement programs employing 3,000 police officers. Of the 208 programs, 43 are operated by the Bureau of Indian Affairs.

The Operations Division consists of telecommunications, uniformed police, corrections and criminal investigations. Headquartered in Albuquerque, New Mexico, the district offices are located in Aberdeen, South Dakota (District I); Oklahoma City, Oklahoma (District II); Phoenix, Arizona (District III); Albuquerque, New Mexico (District IV); Billings, Montana (District V); and Nashville, Tennessee (District VI). All districts are headed by a Special Agent in Charge (SAC) and all Indian Agency and tribal police chiefs must be special agents.

Along with providing direct oversight of bureau programs, the operations division also provides technical assistance and some oversight to law enforcement programs contracted or compacted by tribes under the Self-Determination and Self-Government Policy.

== Duties ==
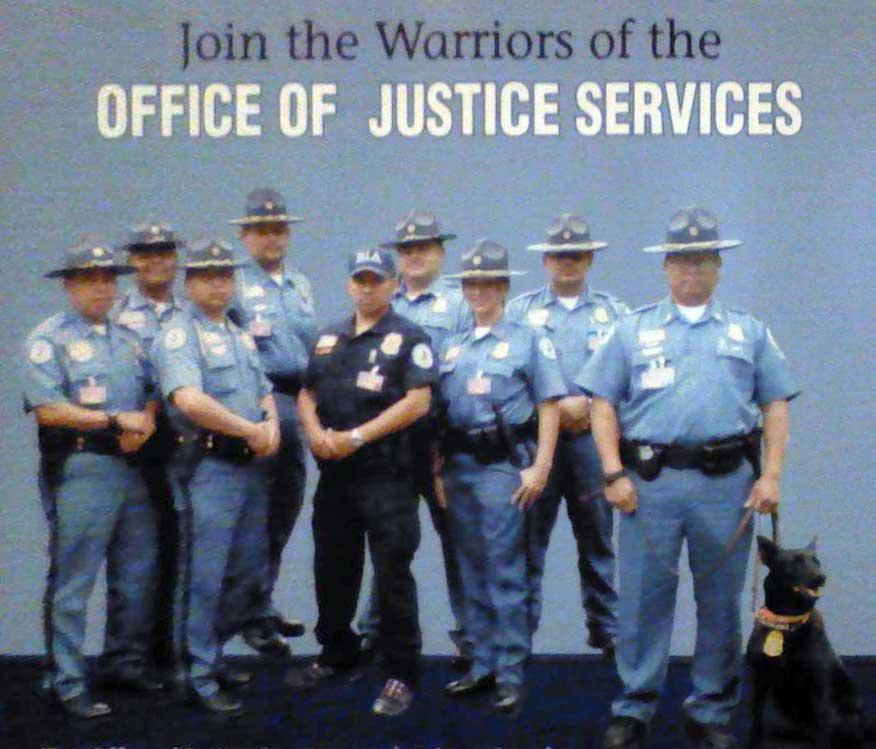
BIA Police Recruiting poster

=== Police Officers ===
The BIA Police Officers (Series 1801 as of April 2023) respond to calls concerning felonies and misdemeanors under Federal, State, local and tribal laws, they Investigate, apprehend, arrest, and detain all persons charged with violation of Title 18 of the United States Code. Career progression starts at 5/7/9/11.

They respond to calls concerning emergencies such as traffic accidents, domestic violence and disorderly conduct. They maintain law and order within the area of assignments by patrolling in a patrol vehicle, investigating suspicious situations, and taking action as appropriate. They perform such assignments as working radar on busy highways, participating in night surveillance in high crime areas, and participating in traffic and crowd control activities. They make arrests in cases of crime or misdemeanors which they personally witnessed; they take persons arrested to appropriate authorities for booking or formal charging.

BIA Officers also enforce all laws and regulations within his/her authority related to possession, use, distribution, trafficking and manufacturing of controlled substances.

BIA Police serve federal, state, or local or tribal warrants, subpoenas and other court papers; testifies at hearings and trials as an expert witness in federal, state, local or tribal courts as required; and prepares and submits reports of incidents or traffic accidents, daily and weekly activities, and narratives and statistical reports as required.

BIA Police officers also conduct, usually independently, investigative work.

=== Correctional Officers ===
The BIA Correctional Officers (Series 0007) are federal law enforcement officers responsible for the operation of BIA Correctional facilities. Most BIA run facilities fall under the supervision of the local BIA Police Chief. BIA Correction facilities house adults and juveniles depending on configuration. Inmates consist of sentenced individuals and individuals that have been arrested and await trial. Daily duties consist of maintaining order and security in their own facilities as well as transports to and from court, other BIA facilities, and tribal jail facilities. Correctional Officers on occasion have supported direct law enforcement with BIA Police but is up to the discretion of local officials .

=== Special Agents ===
BIA Police Special Agents/Criminal Investigators (Series 1811) investigate a wide range of criminal activity including homicide, rape, sexual abuse, and assaults. These types of investigations may include activities such as surveillance, undercover operations, affecting arrests, evidence collection, search warrant execution, interviewing, Grand Jury appearances, case preparation, and trials involving criminal defendants in both federal and tribal court. Special Agents are also involved in various activities, such as special task forces combating illegal drugs, emergency operations task forces, and providing disaster relief and support to other agencies and departments.

== Training and career advancement ==
=== Police Officer ===
BIA Police Officers begin their career with 13 weeks of formal training in police and criminal investigative techniques at the Federal Law Enforcement Training Center site in Artesia, New Mexico. Or a 3 week abbreviated academy based on active law enforcement lateral transfer who meet or exceed the requirements. This training includes courses in criminal law, use of force, rules of evidence, surveillance, arrest procedures, search warrant procedures, detention and arrest, use of firearms, vehicle operations, courtroom demeanor, and Indian Country law.

This classroom study is augmented with hands-on training in photography, crime scene investigation, foot and vehicle patrol, conducting raids, interviewing suspects and witnesses, searching for evidence, and collecting evidence.

Salaries for Police Officers begin at the GL-5/7/9/11 level. After gaining experience in the field, some Police Officers may decide to advance their careers and apply for management/Special Agent positions. These positions are located in various Agency Offices, and would include Chief of Police positions. The management/Special Agent/Chief of Police selection process is competitive and can provide advancement to the GS-9 through GS-12 levels.

=== Correctional Officers ===
BIA Correctional Officers begin their career on the jobs training period lasting up to one year prior to formal Indian Police Academy at Federal Law Enforcement Training Center. Indian Police Academy consists of 6 weeks of formal training in Corrections and Basic Law Enforcement. This training includes courses in correctional code, use of force, rules of evidence, arrest procedures, detention and arrest, vehicle operations, courtroom demeanor, and Indian Country law.

This classroom study is augmented with hands-on training in vehicle driving techniques, use of force training, searching of individuals and searching of cells.

Salaries for Correctional Officers begin at the GL-3/4/5/6/7. These levels consist of the main line officers responsible for day-to-day operations of facilities the GL-8 level is normally reserved for Sergeant responsible for the shift. Supervisory levels are GL-9/10 these consist of Lieutenants and Captains. Lieutenants and Captains are still operational officers but are often found in administrative duties. When there is a local BIA Police Chief Lieutenant will be the highest designated rank for corrections personnel. In the absence of local BIA Police and thus a BIA Police Chief the highest ranked Corrections Officer will be designated a Captain.

=== Special Agent ===
OJS Special Agents begin their career with 12 weeks of formal training in criminal investigative techniques at the Federal Law Enforcement Training Center. This training includes courses in criminal law, use of force, rules of evidence, surveillance, arrest procedures, search warrant procedures, detention and arrest, use of firearms, vehicle operations, and courtroom demeanor.

This classroom study is augmented with hands-on training in photography, crime scene investigation, foot and vehicle surveillance, conducting raids, interviewing suspects and witnesses, searching for evidence, and collecting evidence.

Salaries for Special Agents can begin at the GL-7/9/11 level, or the GL-9/11/12 level, depending upon which positions are available. Special Agents receive an additional 25% in availability pay. After gaining experience in the field, some Special Agents may decide to advance their careers and apply for management positions. These positions are located in various District Offices, Central Office, and in some cases, at the agency level. The management selection process is competitive and can provide advancement to the GS-13, GS-14, and GS-15 levels.

== Line of duty deaths ==
Total line of duty deaths: 52

- Aircraft accident: 1
- Assault: 2
- Automobile accident: 4
- Drowned: 1
- Gunfire: 40
- Gunfire (accidental): 1
- Stabbed: 2
- Vehicular assault: 1

== See also ==
- Outline of United States federal Indian law and policy
- Indian Country Crimes Unit
- United States Indian Police
- Indian agency police
- Indian tribal police
- Law enforcement in the United States
- United States Park Police
