= Artesia, New Mexico =

- City
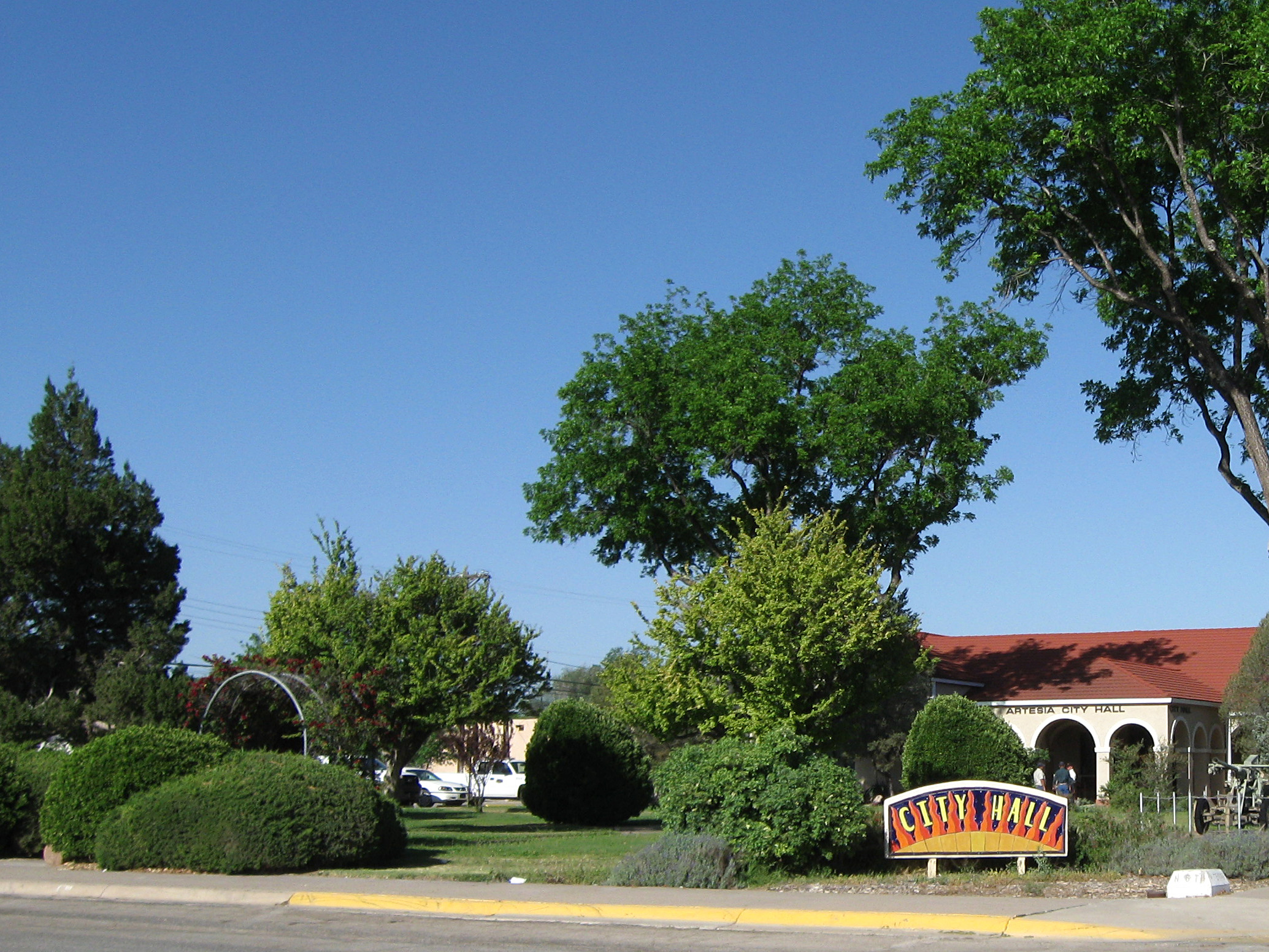
- Artesia City Hall

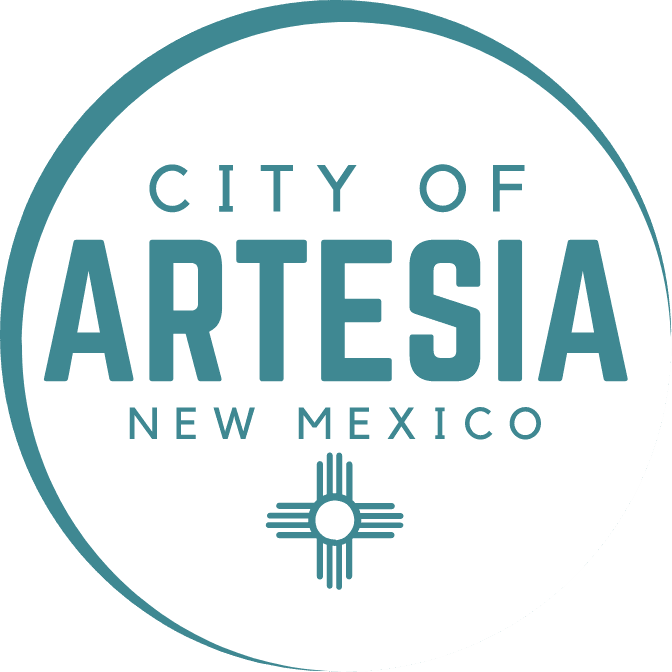
- Seal
- Nickname: City of Champions
- Location in the state of New Mexico
- Coordinates: 32°50′32″N 104°24′12″W
- Country: United States
- State: New Mexico
- County: Eddy
- Founded: 1905

Government
  - Mayor: Jonathan Henry

Area
  - Total: 11.36 sq mi (29.43 km^{2})
  - Land: 11.33 sq mi (29.35 km^{2})
  - Water: 0.035 sq mi (0.09 km^{2})
- Elevation: 3,379 ft (1,030 m)

Population (2020)
  - Total: 12,875
  - Density: 1,136.3/sq mi (438.73/km^{2})
- Time zone: UTC−7 (MST)
  - Summer (DST): UTC−6 (MDT)
- ZIP codes: 88210-88211
- Area code: 575
- FIPS code: 35-05220
- GNIS feature ID: 0885911
- Website: artesianm.gov

Artesia is a city in Eddy County, New Mexico, United States, centered at the intersection of U.S. routes 82 and 285; the two highways serve as the city's Main Street and First Street, respectively. As of the 2020 census, the city population was 12,875.

== History ==
In 1890, it was a route stop (named Miller) between Roswell and Carlsbad. As a livestock-shipping point on the Pecos Valley Southern Railway, it was later named Stegman.

The town assumed its present name in 1903, after the discovery of an artesian aquifer in the area; artesian wells for agriculture flourished in the area until the aquifer became significantly depleted in the 1920s. The city was officially incorporated in 1905. It is home to one of the two Strangite meeting places in the world.

== Geography ==
Artesia is located in northern Eddy County. US 82 leads east 64 miles (103 km) to Lovington and west 110 miles (180 km) to Alamogordo, while US 285 leads north 40 miles (64 km) to Roswell and south 36 miles (58 km) to Carlsbad, the Eddy County seat.

According to the United States Census Bureau, Artesia has a total area of 9.9 square miles (25.7 km^{2}), of which 0.02 square miles (0.05 km^{2}), or 0.21%, is covered by water.

The Pecos River is approximately 4 miles (6 km) east of Artesia.

=== Climate ===
According to the Köppen Climate Classification system, Artesia has a cold semi-arid climate, abbreviated "BSk" on climate maps. The hottest temperature recorded in Artesia was 116 °F (46.7 °C) on June 29, 1918, while the coldest temperature recorded was −20 °F (−28.9 °C) on January 11, 1962.

Climate data for Artesia, New Mexico, 1991–2020 normals, extremes 1905–present
Month	Jan	Feb	Mar	Apr	May	Jun	Jul	Aug	Sep	Oct	Nov	Dec	Year
Record high °F (°C)	85 (29)	89 (32)	100 (38)	104 (40)	106 (41)	116 (47)	111 (44)	110 (43)	106 (41)	100 (38)	90 (32)	86 (30)	116 (47)
Mean maximum °F (°C)	76.0 (24.4)	80.6 (27.0)	87.2 (30.7)	92.2 (33.4)	99.1 (37.3)	104.9 (40.5)	103.6 (39.8)	101.4 (38.6)	97.8 (36.6)	92.0 (33.3)	82.5 (28.1)	75.4 (24.1)	106.5 (41.4)
Mean daily maximum °F (°C)	57.5 (14.2)	62.8 (17.1)	70.5 (21.4)	78.5 (25.8)	86.9 (30.5)	95.2 (35.1)	95.1 (35.1)	93.9 (34.4)	86.8 (30.4)	77.7 (25.4)	65.9 (18.8)	57.1 (13.9)	77.3 (25.2)
Daily mean °F (°C)	40.4 (4.7)	45.1 (7.3)	52.5 (11.4)	60.1 (15.6)	69.6 (20.9)	78.5 (25.8)	80.5 (26.9)	79.1 (26.2)	71.7 (22.1)	60.7 (15.9)	48.7 (9.3)	40.5 (4.7)	60.6 (15.9)
Mean daily minimum °F (°C)	23.3 (−4.8)	27.4 (−2.6)	34.5 (1.4)	41.6 (5.3)	52.3 (11.3)	61.9 (16.6)	65.9 (18.8)	64.3 (17.9)	56.5 (13.6)	43.8 (6.6)	31.6 (−0.2)	23.8 (−4.6)	43.9 (6.6)
Mean minimum °F (°C)	12.0 (−11.1)	15.3 (−9.3)	21.0 (−6.1)	29.1 (−1.6)	39.7 (4.3)	52.2 (11.2)	60.0 (15.6)	57.9 (14.4)	45.3 (7.4)	29.4 (−1.4)	17.3 (−8.2)	10.6 (−11.9)	7.9 (−13.4)
Record low °F (°C)	−20 (−29)	−9 (−23)	−6 (−21)	16 (−9)	26 (−3)	40 (4)	36 (2)	45 (7)	32 (0)	14 (−10)	−10 (−23)	−13 (−25)	−20 (−29)
Average precipitation inches (mm)	0.48 (12)	0.38 (9.7)	0.44 (11)	0.51 (13)	1.18 (30)	1.33 (34)	1.67 (42)	1.63 (41)	1.89 (48)	1.23 (31)	0.81 (21)	0.55 (14)	12.10 (307)
Average snowfall inches (cm)	1.4 (3.6)	0.3 (0.76)	0.1 (0.25)	0.0 (0.0)	0.0 (0.0)	0.0 (0.0)	0.0 (0.0)	0.0 (0.0)	0.0 (0.0)	0.1 (0.25)	0.7 (1.8)	1.2 (3.0)	3.8 (9.66)
Average precipitation days (≥ 0.01 in)	3.2	2.5	3.2	2.4	3.5	4.3	6.2	6.0	5.9	5.3	3.3	2.9	48.7
Average snowy days (≥ 0.1 in)	0.8	0.4	0.1	0.0	0.0	0.0	0.0	0.0	0.0	0.0	0.3	0.7	2.3
Source 1: NOAA
Source 2: National Weather Service

== Demographics ==
Historical population
Census	Pop.	Note	%±
1910	1,883		—
1920	1,115		−40.8%
1930	2,427		117.7%
1940	4,071		67.7%
1950	8,244		102.5%
1960	12,000		45.6%
1970	10,315		−14.0%
1980	10,385		0.7%
1990	10,610		2.2%
2000	10,692		0.8%
2010	11,301		5.7%
2020	12,875		13.9%
U.S. Decennial Census

=== 2020 census ===
As of the 2020 census, Artesia had a population of 12,875. The median age was 34.2 years. 28.6% of residents were under the age of 18 and 13.5% of residents were 65 years of age or older. For every 100 females there were 95.8 males, and for every 100 females age 18 and over there were 94.2 males age 18 and over.

98.9% of residents lived in urban areas, while 1.1% lived in rural areas.

There were 4,869 households in Artesia, of which 37.7% had children under the age of 18 living in them. Of all households, 45.0% were married-couple households, 20.2% were households with a male householder and no spouse or partner present, and 27.1% were households with a female householder and no spouse or partner present. About 27.2% of all households were made up of individuals and 10.6% had someone living alone who was 65 years of age or older.

There were 5,512 housing units, of which 11.7% were vacant. The homeowner vacancy rate was 1.5% and the rental vacancy rate was 13.6%.

Racial composition as of the 2020 census
Race	Number	Percent
White	7,193	55.9%
Black or African American	159	1.2%
American Indian and Alaska Native	241	1.9%
Asian	105	0.8%
Native Hawaiian and Other Pacific Islander	10	0.1%
Some other race	2,451	19.0%
Two or more races	2,716	21.1%
Hispanic or Latino (of any race)	7,135	55.4%

=== 2000 census ===
As of the 2000 census, 10,692 people, 4,080 households, and 2,896 families resided in the city. The population density was 1,341.3 inhabitants per square mile (517.9/km^{2}). The 4,593 housing units averaged 576.2 per square mile (222.5/km^{2}). The racial makeup of the city was 72.25% White, 1.54% Native American, 1.44% African American, 0.20% Asian, 0.15% Pacific Islander, 21.56% from other races, and 2.86% from two or more races. Hispanics or Latinos of any race were 44.98% of the population.

Of the 4,080 households, 36.7% had children under the age of 18 living with them, 52.8% were married couples living together, 14.2% had a female householder with no husband present, and 29.0% were not families. About 26.6% of all households were made up of individuals, and 13.0% had someone living alone who was 65 years of age or older. The average household size was 2.61 and the average family size was 3.15.

In the city, the population was distributed as 30.3% under the age of 18, 9.0% from 18 to 24, 25.5% from 25 to 44, 20.1% from 45 to 64, and 15.1% who were 65 years of age or older. The median age was 35 years. For every 100 females, there were 92.0 males. For every 100 females age 18 and over, there were 87.6 males.

The median income for a household in the city was $29,529, and for a family was $34,598. Males had a median income of $30,085 versus $19,566 for females. The per capita income for the city was $13,911. About 15.7% of families and 20.1% of the population were below the poverty line, including 24.8% of those under age 18 and 20.0% of those age 65 or over.

== Economy ==
The principal economic activities that support Artesia are the oil and gas industry, agriculture, and dairy. Prominent local oil and gas businesses include Wilbanks Trucking Services, EOG Resources, Mack Energy Corporation, and Marbob Energy Corp. In the fall of 2010, Concho Resources acquired most of Marbob Energy Corp's assets for nearly $1.6 billion. HFSinclair Corporation also operates the Navajo Refinery, the largest refinery in New Mexico, at the corner of 1st and Main Street.

Artesia is home to the former Abo Elementary School, identified by One Nation Underground (ISBN 0-8147-7522-5) as the first and most likely only public school which is entirely underground and equipped to function as a fallout shelter. The school, completed in 1962, had a concrete slab roof which served as the school's playground. It contained a large storage facility with room for supplies for 2000 people in the event of nuclear warfare. The building was listed on the National Register of Historic Places in 1999 and is located at 1802 W Centre Ave.

The city has one of the few residential training sites of the Federal Law Enforcement Training Centers, mostly for the United States Border Patrol, BIA Police, and the US Air Marshals. The center is located on the former campus of the College of Artesia, which operated from 1966 to 1971.

Artesia has a high-voltage direct current back-to-back station which connects the eastern and western electric grids in Eddy County. This tie, built by General Electric in 1983, can transfer a maximum power of 200 megawatts. The used voltage is 82 kV.

The Artesia Restaurant and Hotel is prominently featured as a location in the film The Man Who Fell to Earth starring David Bowie.

=== Immigration ===
Artesia was the site of the Artesia Detention Center, which was responsible for individuals entering the US illegally and going through proper dockets that are in compliance with current US immigration laws. This location had incidents of humanitarian issues, for example a US citizen child was detained and legal issues due to its remoteness and the extent of this immigration issue. It was closed in December 2014.

== Education ==
Artesia is served by the Artesia Public School District with these schools:

- Artesia High School (grades 10–12)
- Artesia Junior High School (grades 8–9)
- Artesia Intermediate School (grades 6–7)
- Central Elementary School (grades 1–5)
- Hermosa Elementary School (grades 1–5)
- Roselawn Elementary School (grades 1–5)
- Yeso Elementary School (grades 1–5)
- Yucca Elementary School (grades 1–5)
- Grand Heights Early Child Ctr. (kindergarten)

The Artesia Bulldogs play in the 5A football division and have won 33 state titles. Former Head Coach and Athletic Director Cooper Henderson led the Bulldogs to 14 titles.

== Notable people ==
- Vernon Asbill (born 1945), educator and former member of the New Mexico Senate
- Mack C. Chase (born 1931), oil and natural gas tycoon
- Candy Ezzell (born 1953), member of the New Mexico House of Representatives
- Tanner Gray (born 1999), racing driver
- Taylor Gray (born 2005), racing driver
- Ray Handley (born 1944), former New York Giants head coach
- Alexa Havins (born 1980), Daytime Emmy Award-winning television actress
- Jonathan Henry, mayor and state legislator
- Landry Jones (born 1989), quarterback for Oklahoma Sooners and NFL's Pittsburgh Steelers
- Steve Jones (born 1958), professional golfer
- Cody Lambert (born 1961), professional rodeo cowboy
- Edgar Mitchell (born 1930), Astronaut who walked on the Moon during the 1971 Apollo 14 mission
- Terry Lee Williams (born 1950), first African American to serve in the Utah State Senate
