= James White =

James or Jim White may refer to:

== Politics ==
=== Australian politics ===
- James White (South Australian politician) (1820–1892), land agent and MHA
- James White (New South Wales politician) (1828–1890), member of Legislative Assembly, then Council; racehorse owner
- James Cobb White (1855–1927), New South Wales politician, member of Legislative Council, nephew of the above
- James Wharton White (1857–1930), MHA in South Australia

=== Canadian politics ===
- James George White, MPP in Ontario

=== UK politics ===
- James White (English politician) (1809–1883), MP for Plymouth and Brighton
- Martin White (politician) (James Martin White, 1857–1928), businessman and Member of Parliament for Forfar
- J. D. White (James Dundas White, 1866–1951), Member of Parliament for Dunbartonshire and Glasgow Tradeston
- James White (Scottish politician) (1922–2009), MP for Glasgow Pollok
- James White (Irish politician) (1938–2014), Irish businessman, hotelier and politician

=== US politics ===
- James White (North Carolina politician, died c. 1789) (c. 1742–c. 1789) member of the North Carolina House of Burgesses
- James White (general) (1747–1821), Franklin, North Carolina, and Tennessee politician, founder of Knoxville, Tennessee
- James White (Southwest Territory politician) (1749–1809), delegate to the Congress of the Confederation from North Carolina and to the U.S. House of Representatives from the Southwest Territory
- James Bunbury White (1774–1819), North Carolina politician, founder of Whiteville, North Carolina
- James White (Maine politician) (1792–1870), Maine state treasurer, 1842–1846
- James Bain White (1835–1897), congressman from Indiana
- James T. White (politician) (1837–1892), African-American Baptist minister and Arkansas politician
- James Stephen White (1838–1908), Wisconsin politician
- James Bamford White (1842–1931), congressman from Kentucky
- James F. White (1935–2026), Minnesota politician
- James White (New Mexico politician) (1942–2021)
- Jim White (politician) (born 1944), former member of the South Dakota Senate
- James Lee White, member of the Maine House of Representatives
- James White (Texas politician) (born 1964), former member of Texas House of Representatives

== Religion ==
- James White (archdeacon of Armagh) (died 1530)
- James S. White (1821–1881), husband of Ellen G. White and co-founder of the Seventh-day Adventist Church
- James Edson White (1849–1928), adventist and author, son of James Springer White and Ellen G. White
- James Rowland White (c. 1851–1885), self-proclaimed prophet
- James Emery White (born 1961), president of Gordon-Conwell Theological Seminary
- James White (theologian) (born 1962), American theologian

== Sports ==
=== American football ===
- Jim White (New York Giants) (1920–1987), American football tackle for the New York Giants
- Jim White (defensive end) (1948–1981), American football defensive end
- James White (defensive tackle) (born 1953), former NFL defensive/nose tackle for the Minnesota Vikings
- James White (running back) (born 1992), former NFL running back for the New England Patriots

=== Association football ===
- James White (Scottish footballer) (1899–1983)
- Jimmy White (Irish footballer) (fl. 1923–1969), Irish international football (soccer) player
- Jimmy White (footballer, born 1942) (1942–2017), English football (soccer) player

=== Australian rules football ===
- Jim White (footballer, born 1878) (1878–1956), Australian rules footballer for Essendon in 1897
- Jim White (footballer, born 1922) (1922–2006), Australian rules footballer
- James White (Australian footballer) (born 1980), Australian rules footballer for Richmond

=== Basketball ===
- Jim White (basketball) (fl. 1940s), American basketball player
- James White (basketball) (born 1982), American basketball player

=== Rugby union ===
- James White (rugby union) (born 2003), New Zealand rugby union player
- Jim White (rugby union) (c. 1883–1995), Australian rugby union player
- Jimmy White (rugby union) (1911–1997), South African rugby union player

=== Other sports ===
- James White, known as Deacon White (1847–1939), baseball player
- James L. White (coach) (1893–1949), American college baseball, basketball and football head coach
- Jim White (cricketer) (1901–1964), Australian cricketer
- James White (baseball), American Negro league baseball player
- James White (cross-country) (born 1941), American high school cross country coach
- Jim White (wrestler) (1942–2010), in the Southern United States
- Jimmy White (born 1962), English snooker player
- Jay White (born 1992), New Zealand professional wrestler
- Jimmy White (Gaelic footballer), Gaelic football referee, manager and player

== Arts and media ==
=== Writers ===
- James White (writer and translator) (1759–1799), historical novelist
- James White (author) (1928–1999), writer of science fiction novellas, short stories, and novels
- James L. White (poet) (1936–1981), poet and author
- James P. White (writer) (born 1940), author and editor

=== Musicians ===
- Jimmy White (singer) (born 1955), American singer-songwriter and record producer
- Jim White (drummer) (born 1962), Australian drummer for Dirty Three
- James Chance or James White (1953-2024), American musician
- James White (rapper), American rapper with German hip-hop group C-Block
- Jim White (guitarist) (born 1957), American southern singer/songwriter

=== Film ===
- James H. White (1872–1944), Canadian film pioneer
- James L. White (screenwriter) (1947–2015), American screenwriter
- James Gordon White, screenwriter

=== Other people in arts and media ===
- James White (sculptor) (1861–1918), English-born sculptor who emigrated to Australia
- James C. White (1937–2009), American radio talk show host
- Jim White (journalist) (1957), British sports television announcer and journalist, now with STV
- Jim White (presenter) (born 1957) Scottish sports television announcer and journalist

== Other people ==
- James White (inventor) (1762–1825), English engineer and inventor
- James White (1775–1820), advertising agent and author
- James White (1812–1884), Scottish lawyer and chemicals manufacturer
- James Terry White (1845–1920), editor of The National Cyclopaedia of American Biography
- James Landrum White (1847–1925), shape note singing teacher and composer
- James White (geographer) (1863–1928), Canadian geographer
- James White (financier) (1877–1927), English property speculator
- James Larkin White (1882–1946), discoverer and explorer of Carlsbad Caverns
- James White (RAF officer) (1893–1972), World War I fighter ace
- James White (art expert) (1913–2003), Irish art expert and author
- James Boyd White (born 1938), American law professor, literary critic, scholar and philosopher
- James J. White (born 1934), law professor, legal scholar
- James White (engineer) (1938–2009), American polymer scientist
- James Clarke White (dermatologist) (1833–1916), American dermatologist and professor at Harvard Medical School
- James Clarke White (neurosurgeon) (died 1981), American neurosurgeon and professor at Harvard Medical School
- Jimmy White, a member of the gang that committed the Great Train Robbery

== Other uses ==
- James White (film), a 2015 drama

== See also ==
- James Whyte (disambiguation)
