= James Clarke White =

James Clarke White may refer to:

- James Clarke White (dermatologist) (1833–1916), American dermatologist and professor at Harvard Medical School
- James Clarke White (neurosurgeon) (died 1981), American neurosurgeon and professor at Harvard Medical School
