= Aspergillus carlsbadensis =

Scientific classification
- Kingdom: Fungi
- Division: Ascomycota
- Class: Eurotiomycetes
- Order: Eurotiales
- Family: Aspergillaceae
- Genus: Aspergillus
- Species: A. carlsbadensis

Binomial name
- Aspergillus carlsbadensis Frisvad, Varga & Samson, 2011

Type strain
- IBT 14493, CBS 12389

Species of fungus

Aspergillus carlsbadensis is a species of fungus in the genus Aspergillus which has been isolated from the Carlsbad Caverns National Park in New Mexico in the United States. It is from the Usti section.

== Growth and morphology ==
A. carlsbadensis has been cultivated on both Czapek yeast extract agar (CYA) plates and Malt Extract Agar Oxoid® (MEAOX) plates. The growth morphology of the colonies can be seen in the pictures below.

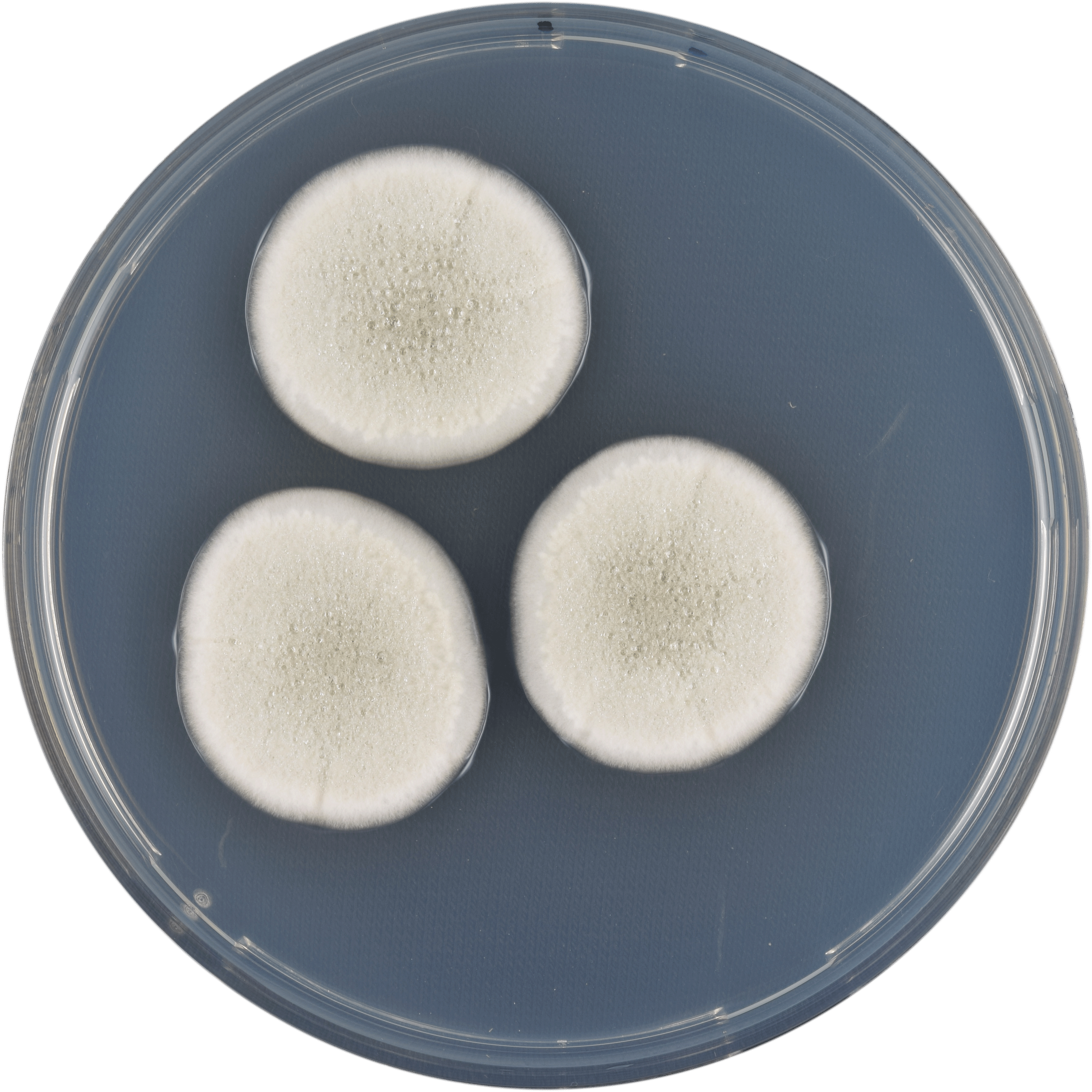
Aspergillus carlsbadensis growing on CYA plate

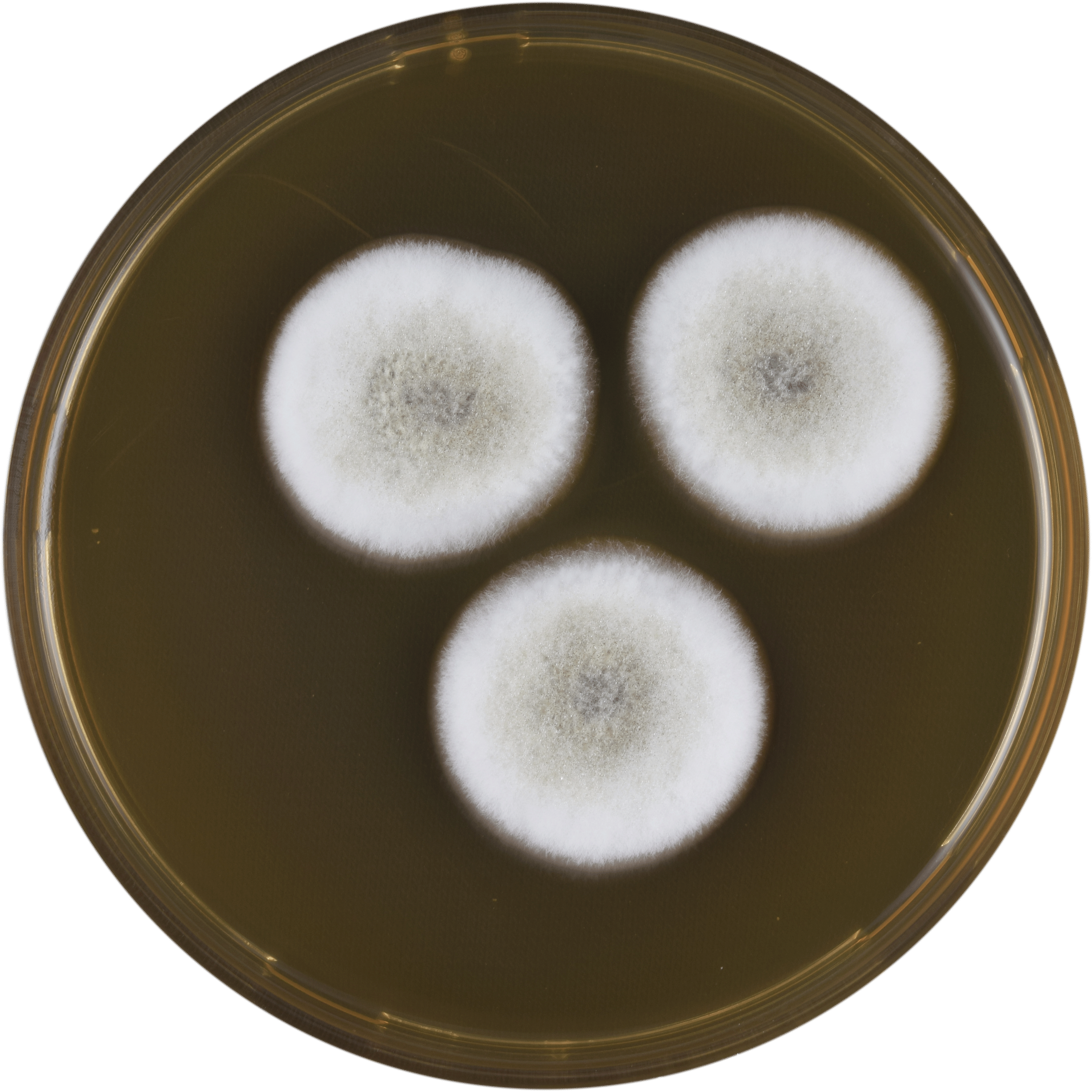
Aspergillus carlsbadensis growing on MEAOX plate
