= James Whyte =

James Whyte may refer to:

- James Whyte (Australian politician) (1820–1882), Scottish-born Australian politician
- James Whyte (bishop) (1868–1957), Roman Catholic bishop of Dunedin, 1920–1957
- James A. Whyte (1920–2005), Scottish theologian
- James Matthew Whyte (died 1843), Scottish-born soldier, land owner and bank president in Upper Canada
- James P. Whyte Jr. (1921–2007), American legal scholar
- Jamie Whyte, New Zealand-born, UK philosopher
- James Whyte, co-founder of Scottish Whisky Company Whyte & Mackay
- James Whyte, rally driver from Zimbabwe, winner of 2009 and 2010 ARC titles
- Jim Whyte (footballer) (born 1944), Scottish footballer

== See also ==
- James White (disambiguation)
