= Oak Spring (Eddy County, New Mexico) =

Spring in Eddy County, New Mexico, USA

Coordinates: 32°10′49″N 104°26′53″W

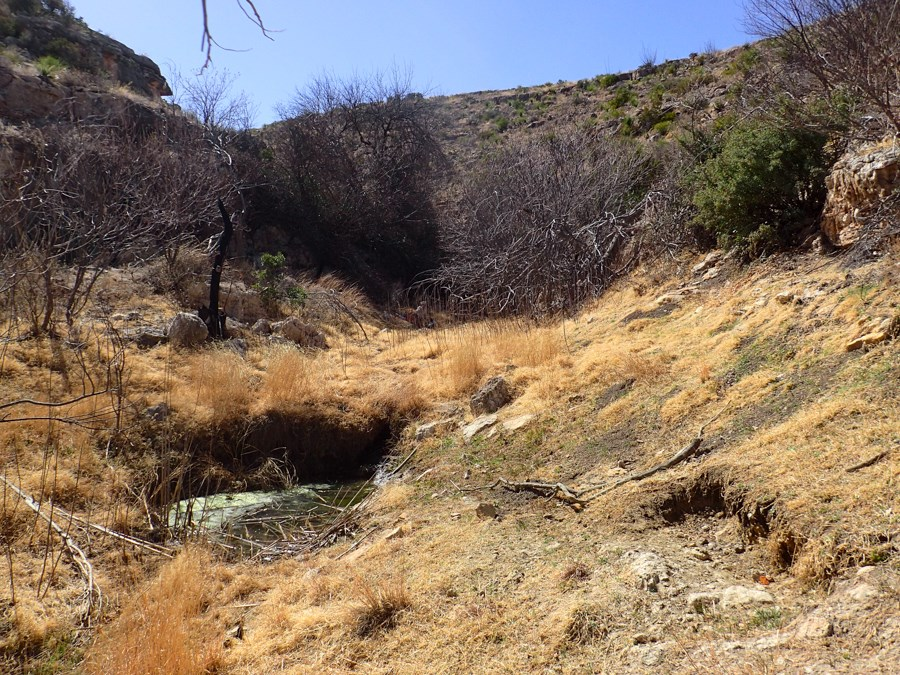
- An image of the main opening of Oak Spring, in Carlsbad Caverns National Park, and the Bermuda grass dominating the area. Photographed in 2022.
- Interactive map of Oak Spring
- Elevation: 1.29 km (0.80 mi)
- Discharge: 0.16 gal. per minute

Oak Spring is a spring in Lechuguilla Canyon, New Mexico. Oak Spring is one of many springs in Carlsbad Caverns National Park, and is located about 0.62 miles (1.00 km) northwest of the Carlsbad Caverns Visitor Center. The spring has been documented as early as 1961. It has shrunk significantly between 2016 and 2022.

== Description ==
=== Water ===
==== Flow ====
Oak Spring is classified as a complex rheocrene spring and has multiple openings at the end of an underground drainage. It is a 7th magnitude spring and the main opening has a discharge rate of 0.16 gallons per minute. Oak Spring's water leaks from a complex system of fissures in the surrounding limestone canyon walls, feeding into a stream channel at the bottom of the canyon. The water flows through the channel and a crescent-shaped pool, then flows into two smaller channels beneath compacted mud and Bermuda grass. The two channels eventually merge into a pool which flows into gravel. The main channel is ~3.3 feet wide on average and there is an average depth of 0.4 inches.

==== Water quality ====
The water is cool and is not polluted but there is evidence of litter. The pH, minerals, and oxygen levels in the water are within the expected ranges for the springs in that region. The water is clear but there is algae in the water.

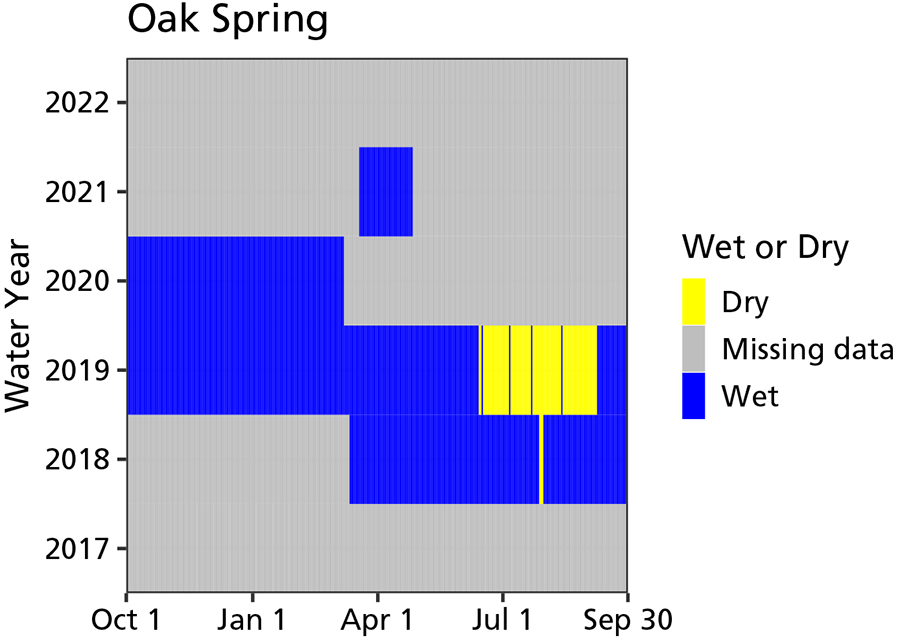
A graph showing the water persistence in Oak Spring, from 2017 to 2022.

=== Human activity ===
A few dilapidated structures, such as several concrete dams, one of which is ~3 feet thick, have altered the water's flow. There is evidence of rack, man-made depressions, man-made berms, tracks, game trails, cow dung, and wooden debris. The history and purpose of these structures is unknown. In 2016, burned snags indicated some form of a fire had once been in the area.

=== Vegetation ===
Nearby native flora includes sedge, cattail, maidenhair ferns, and bush croton. Oak Spring has one of the highest densities of invasive plants of all the perennial springs in the Sonoran Desert and Chihuahuan Desert. The ground cover is made up of invasive Bermuda grass, and invasive horehound. There is also non-native Johnson grass in the vicinity.
