= Rattlesnake Springs Historic District =

Historic district in New Mexico, United States

- U.S. National Register of Historic Places
- U.S. Historic district
- NM State Register of Cultural Properties
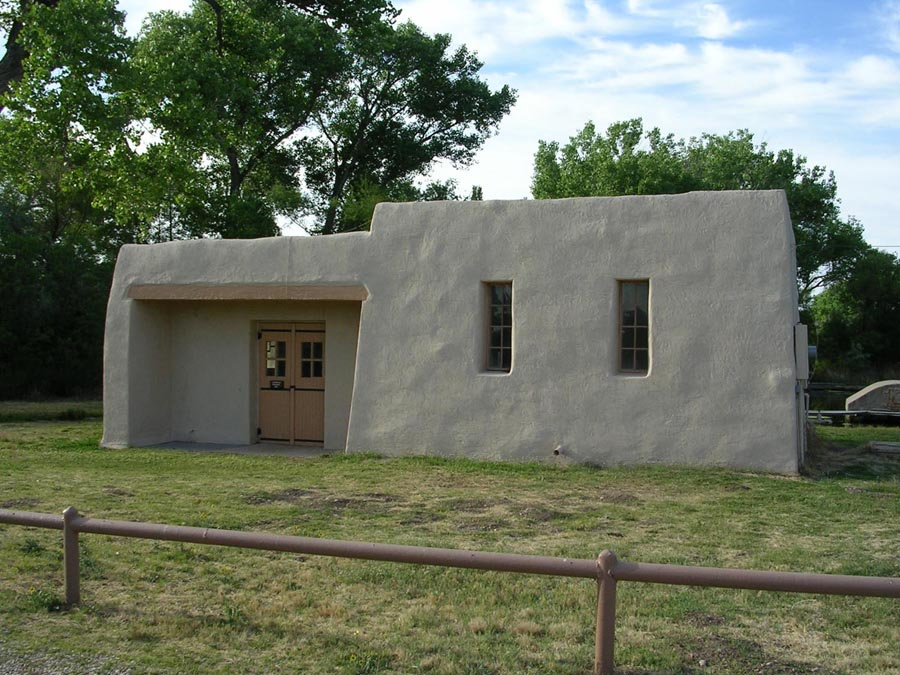
- Pump House

- Location within New Mexico Location within the United States
- Nearest city: Carlsbad, New Mexico
- Coordinates: 32°06′36″N 104°28′04″W
- Area: 24 acres (9.7 ha)
- Architect: Harvey Cornell
- Architectural style: Late 19th And 20th Century Revivals, Pueblo, New Mexico Territorial
- NRHP reference No.: 88001130
- NMSRCP No.: 1496

Significant dates
- Added to NRHP: July 14, 1988
- Designated NMSRCP: January 13, 1989

The Rattlesnake Springs Historic District is part of an isolated unit of Carlsbad Caverns National Park, surrounding a spring that creates an oasis in the Chihuahuan Desert. The area was homesteaded and farmed in 1880 by William Henry Harrison. Harrison, who claimed kinship with U.S. President William Henry Harrison, established the Harrison ditch system to irrigate the lands, which remains in existence, and which is responsible for the landscaped appearance of the area today. Harrison died in 1930, and the National Park Service acquired the property as a source of water for the national park, 6 miles (9.7 km) to the north and west. The Park Service built a number of structures in the Territorial Revival style.

The Park Service, with assistance from Civilian Conservation Corps (CCC) laborers, removed most of the homestead structures and continued to landscape the area. A CCC camp was established at Rattlesnake Springs. During the latter part of World War II, the now-abandoned CCC camp was used as a recreation center for military personnel from a nearby airfield, but was demolished by the 1950s.

Later Park Service structures were designed by Ken Saunders and Del Jones at the Park Service Branch of Plans and Designs in Santa Fe. Notable structures include the 1940 Ranger's Residence and the 1933 Pump House designed by William G. Carnes in the Pueblo Revival style. A fruit orchard established by Harrison and landscaping created by the Park Service also are considered contributing elements to the historic district.

The Rattlesnake Springs district was placed on the National Register of Historic Places on July 14, 1988. The area is noted for the number of bird species it supports in the otherwise arid region.

== See also ==
- National Register of Historic Places listings in Carlsbad Caverns National Park
- National Register of Historic Places listings in Eddy County, New Mexico
