= The Caverns Historic District =

Historic district in New Mexico, United States

- U.S. National Register of Historic Places
- U.S. Historic district
- NM State Register of Cultural Properties
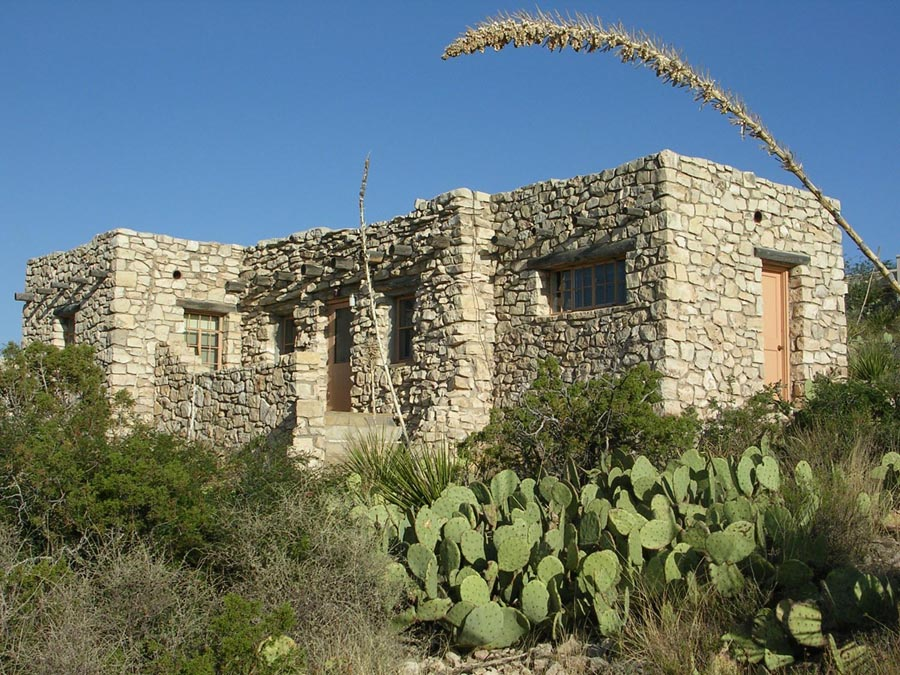
- Pueblo Revival style residence

- Location within New Mexico Location within the United States
- Nearest city: Carlsbad, New Mexico
- Coordinates: 32°10′37″N 104°26′31″W
- Area: 13 acres (5.3 ha)
- Built: 1927
- Architect: Thomas Chalmers Vint; Et al.
- Architectural style: Pueblo, New Mexican Territorial
- NRHP reference No.: 88001173
- NMSRCP No.: 269

Significant dates
- Added to NRHP: August 18, 1988
- Designated NMSRCP: February 9, 1973

The Caverns Historic District comprises the central developed area of Carlsbad Caverns National Park. The complex was built between the early 1920s and 1942, initially in Pueblo Revival style, and later in New Mexico Territorial Revival style in the area around the natural entrance to Carlsbad Caverns. The earlier structures are built of local limestone, the later buildings in adobe. Thirteen buildings in the district are considered contributing structures. Buildings built between 1940 and 1942 were constructed with labor provided by the Civilian Conservation Corps.

== Design ==
Early planning for the development of the park started with work by Daniel Ray Hull of the National Park Service Landscape Engineering Division in Los Angeles, who established the Pueblo Revival style in the park. Thomas Chalmers Vint continued Hull's work from the division's new location in San Francisco, renamed the NPS Western Field Office, as its chief. During survey work in the caverns, Vint slipped and fell, breaking his leg. A cowboy named Jim White was sent for help, which arrived after several hours. Vint had to make a long train ride to El Paso, Texas to have his leg set. The incident highlighted the need for safe, well-planned visitor accommodations in the park.

The rustic designs proved popular with park visitors and became a feature of the park. A similar structure was built in the town of Carlsbad as a residence for the park superintendent.

== Description ==
Bunk House and Mess Hall, NPS Building 16 The Pueblo style building was designed by Thomas Chalmers Vint of the National Park Service and was built in 1932 by Armstrong and Armstrong contractors of Roswell, New Mexico. The building incorporates a 1927 residence designed by park superintendent Thomas Boles. The one-story building is on several levels following the contour of its hillside site, with eleven original rooms. A lounge space, now known as the "chapel," featured a higher level of finish.

Employee Residence, NPS Building 6 was designed in 1927 by Thomas Boles as a residence for cave guides. Buildings 7, 8 and 9 are substantially similar, all in Pueblo Revival style. They were enlarged under the direction of Thomas Vint in 1932.

Employee Residence, NPS Building 13 was designed by Vint in 1931, enlarged to a duplex in 1932 and eventually converted to a men's dormitory.

Employee Residence Duplex, NPS Building 14A/B was designed as two connected residences by Vint in 1932.

Employee Residence, NPS Building 15 was designed by Vint in 1932. Like Buildings 13 and 14, it was built by Armstrong and Armstrong. All of these buildings are in matching stone Pueblo Revival style.

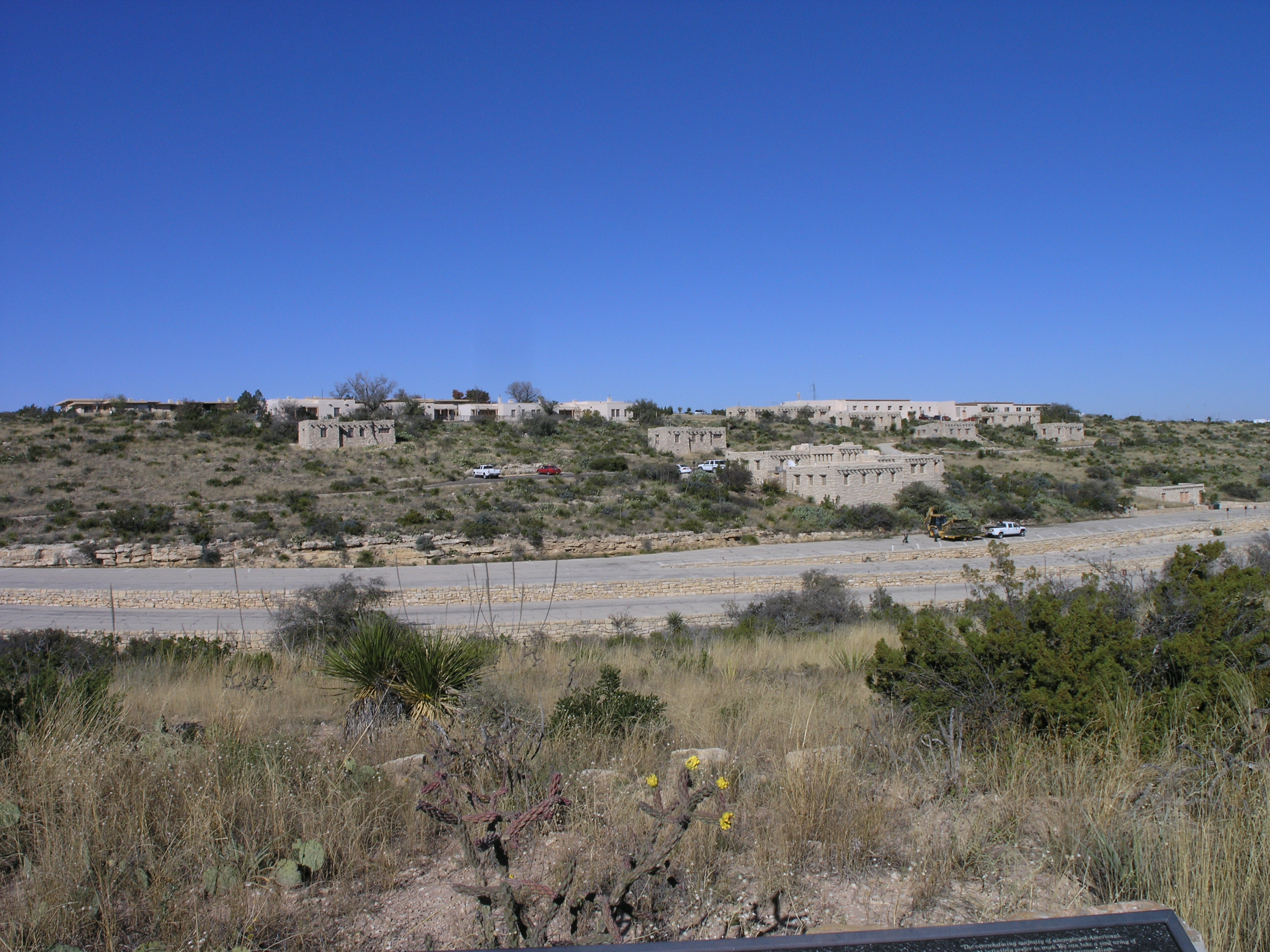
Overview of the historic district structures

Powerhouse: The center portion was designed in 1928 by Vint, with wings added for shops in 1931, in Pueblo GRevival style. The building was converted to a maintenance shop and storage area.

Multiple Dwelling Unit 1 and 2, NPS Buildings 25-A/B/C and 28-A/B/C These triplex residences were designed by architect Ken Saunders of the NPS Santa Fe office and revised by Lyle E. Bennett in Territorial Revival style in from 1940 to 1942, in a landscape designed by J.C. Miller, and were built by the Civilian Conservation Corps.

Warehouse, NPS Building 26 was designed by Saunders in 1941 in Territorial Revival style and built by CCC labor. Building 27, a garage, was also probably designed by Saunders

An elevator building for access to the caverns was completely enclosed by the 1957 park visitor center. Other buildings, now demolished, included a concessions building, built in 1928, and operated by the park concessioner, the Caverns Supply Company.

== Bat flight amphitheater ==
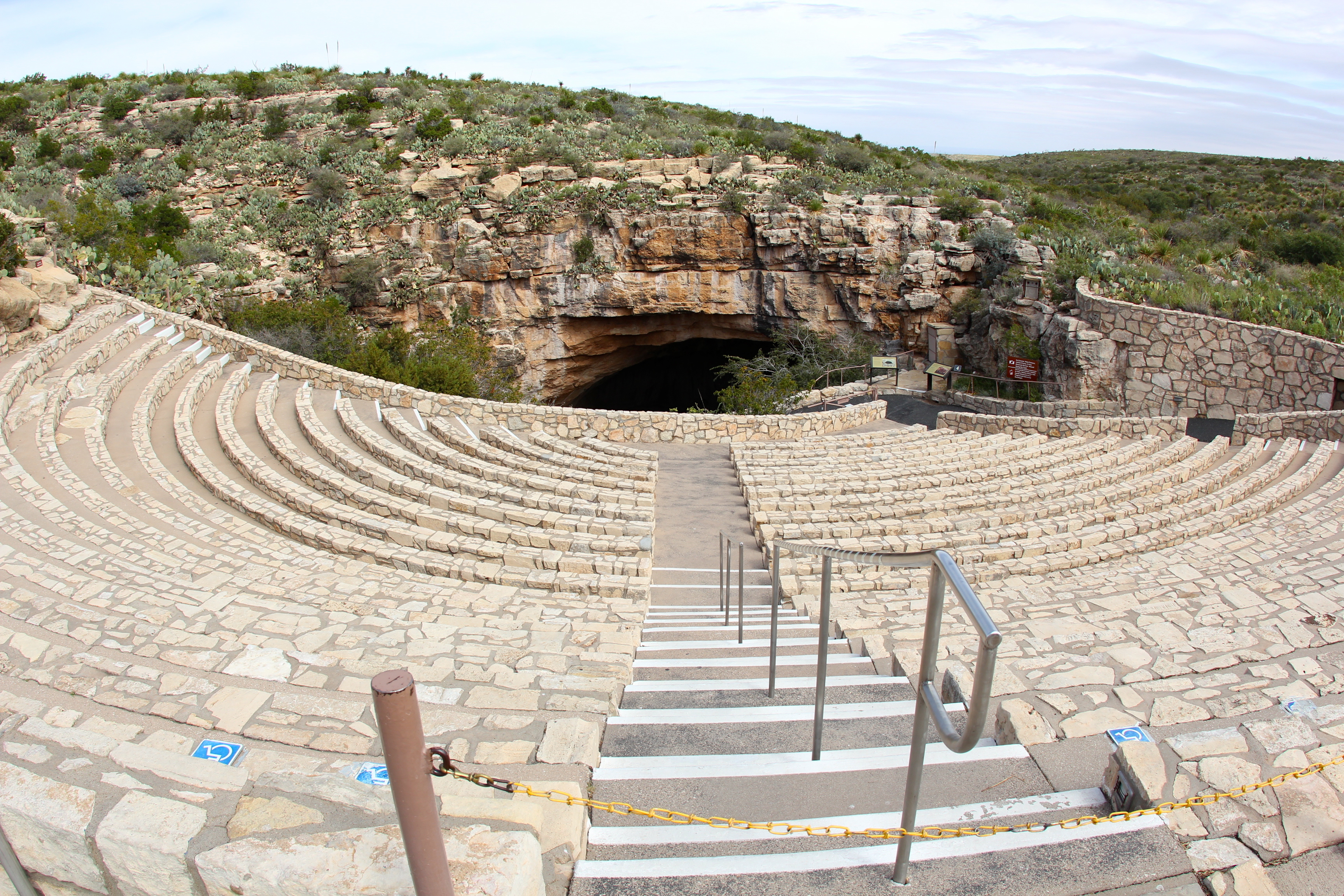

From the end of May to October, the National Park Service hosts visitors in the Bat Flight Amphitheater to view Mexican free-tailed bats leaving the Carlsbad Cavern in large numbers at nightfall through its main entrance.

Built between 1963 and 1966, the amphitheater is made of limestone. It is about 100 feet (30 m) wide and made up of 22 rows of seating arranged in tiered arches and separated by a central aisle with a staircase. Overall, it drops down about 75 feet (23 m).

The amphitheater is a contributing property to the Caverns Historic District, which mainly houses administrative buildings northwest of the amphitheater and is listed on the National Register of Historic Places.

The upper part of the amphitheater is reached by the Carlsbad Caverns Trail, a hiking trail leading from the park's tourist office in the southwest, which then sinks into the cavern in the northeast. The trail has also been listed as a National Recreation Trail since 1983.

== Landscaping ==
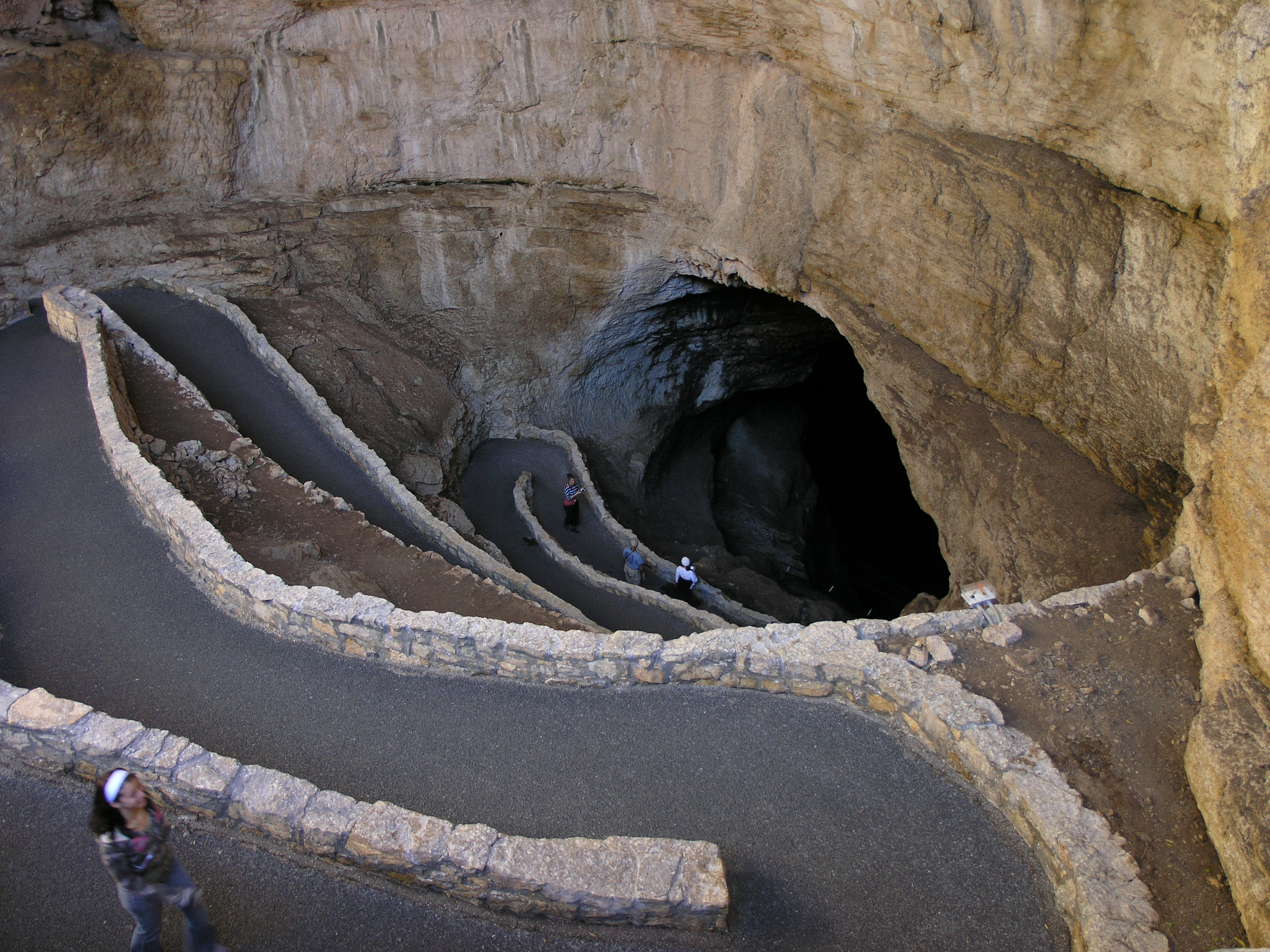
Switchback trail to the natural cave entrance

The parking terraces were designed by A.W. Burney of Yellowstone National Park's engineering division. Construction was supervised by park superintendent Boles, who was also an engineer. The terraces are designed to fit the local environment with rustic stone walls and landscaping with native plants. A cactus garden was established at the end of the parking area, designed by Park Service architect W.G. Carnes, incorporating a prehistoric mescal pit. A switchback trail leads to the natural cave entrance, with other footpaths and terraces to the residences and the administration building.

An amphitheater, built from 1963 to 1966 to allow visitors to view evening bat flights, continues the design tradition, blending with earlier construction.

== Civilian Conservation Corps ==
A Civilian Conservation Corps camp was established at the separate Rattlesnake Springs unit of Carlsbad Caverns National Park in 1938. The arrival of the CCC coincided with a shift to Territorial Revival style architecture in the park, incorporating adobe construction. The camp remained until 1942, when it was disbanded.

== Recent history ==
The ticket office, chief ranger's house, concessions building-comfort station, original powerhouse and the nursery-kennel building were demolished between 1959 and 1974 as intrusions in the area of the natural cave entrance. By 1984 the removal of toilet facilities was regretted, and a rustic stone structure was built near the bat flight amphitheater.

The Caverns Historic District was listed on the National Register of Historic Places on August 18, 1988.

== See also ==
- National Register of Historic Places listings in Carlsbad Caverns National Park
- National Register of Historic Places listings in Eddy County, New Mexico
