= Jim White (cricketer) =

Australian cricketer

Personal information
- Born: 18 October 1901; Scone, New South Wales, Australia
- Died: 6 March 1964 (aged 62); Sydney, Australia
- Source: ESPNcricinfo, 6 February 2017

Jim White (18 October 1901 – 6 March 1964) was an Australian cricketer. He played twenty first-class matches for Cambridge University and New South Wales between 1922 and 1926.

== See also ==
- List of New South Wales representative cricketers
