= Jim White (footballer, born 1922) =

Australian rules footballer

Personal information
- Full name: Jim White
- Born: 25 April 1922
- Died: 25 May 2006 (aged 84)
- Original team: Surrey Hills
- Height: 183 cm (6 ft 0 in)
- Weight: 86 kg (190 lb)

Playing career^{1}
Years	Club	Games (Goals)
1942	Hawthorn	2 (0)
- ^{1} Playing statistics correct to the end of 1942.

Jim White (25 April 1922 – 25 May 2006) was an Australian rules footballer who played with Hawthorn in the Victorian Football League (VFL).
