= James Larkin White =

Discoverer of Carlsbad Caverns

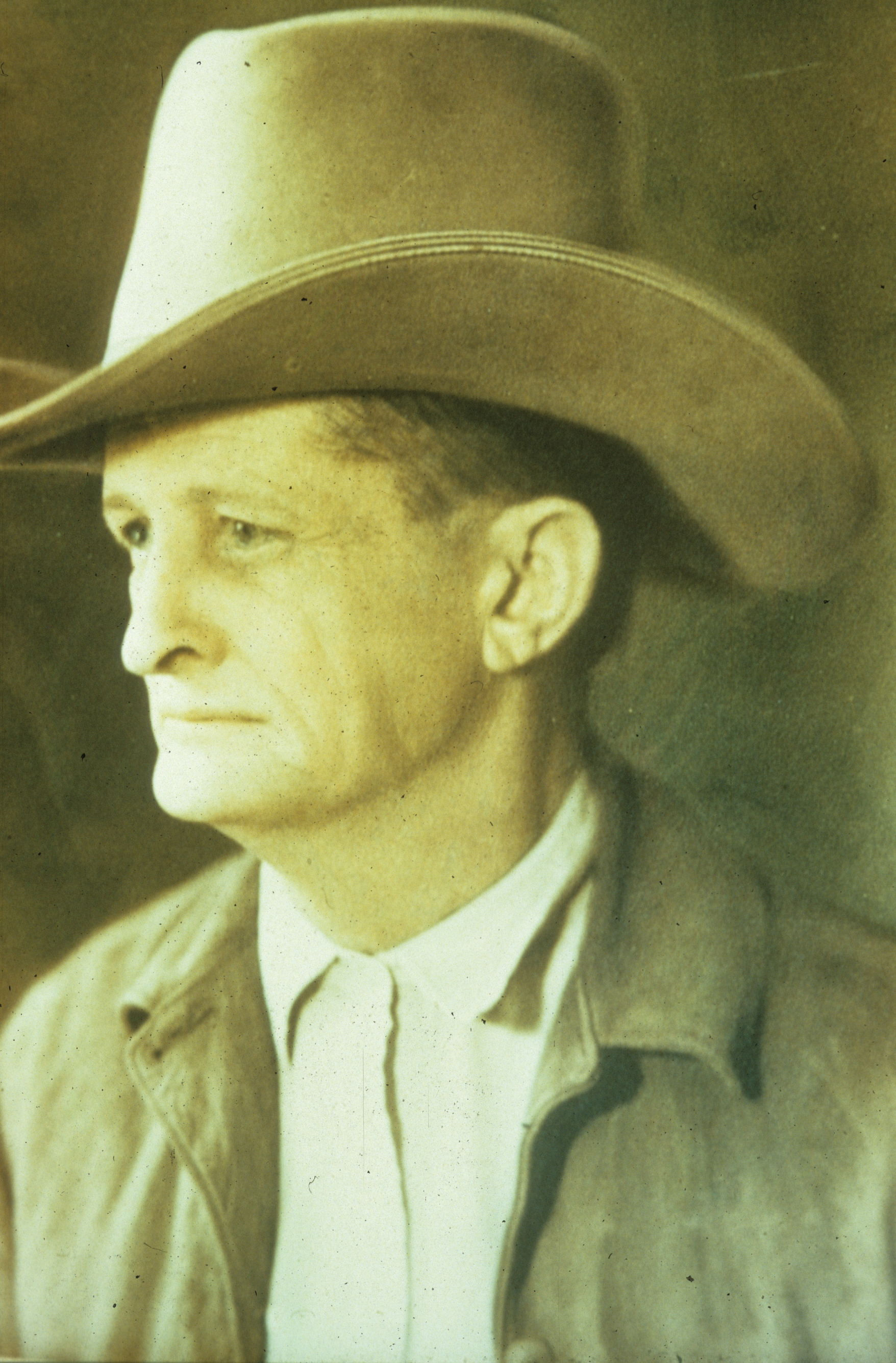
- Jim White
- Born: July 11, 1882; Mason County, Texas
- Died: April 26, 1946 (aged 63); Carlsbad, New Mexico
- Occupation: Cave promoter/explorer

James Larkin White (July 11, 1882– April 26, 1946) was a cowboy, guano miner, cave explorer, and park ranger for the National Park Service. He is best remembered as the discoverer, early promoter and explorer of what is known today as Carlsbad Caverns in Carlsbad Caverns National Park, New Mexico.

== Birth ==
I want to be a cowboy.

— Jim White, One Man's Dream

Jim White was born on July 11, 1882, on a ranch in Mason County, Texas. He started working in the cattle business at a very early age and preferred it to the school his father forced him to attend. He preferred "bustin' broncos to books and blackboards". One day, when Jim had had enough of school, he begged his father to let him do something else. "I want to be a cowboy", he said. So, when he was 10 years old, his father agreed to take him to the southeastern corner of the New Mexico Territory. He left him at the ranch of John and Dan Lucas (XXX Ranch). His father bought land at Lonetree, just west of the developing town of Eddy (Carlsbad today), and moved the rest of the family there three years later. Jim occasionally stayed at his family's small horse farm, but mostly lived and worked at the Lucas ranch.

== Discovery ==
... any hole in the ground which could house such a gigantic army of bats must be a whale of a big cave.

— Jim White, Jim White's Own Story

An inscription reading "J White 1898" was discovered deep within Carlsbad Caverns in the 1980s. It provides witness to the presence of a 15- or 16-year-old Jim White.

While riding his horse through the Chihuahuan Desert looking for stray cattle with a fence mending crew for the Lucas brothers, Jim saw a plume of bats rising from the desert hills. It appeared to be a volcano, or a whirlwind but did not behave quite like either. He tied his horse to a nearby tree and worked his way through the brush to the edge of a large opening in the ground. Jim described the moment by saying, "I found myself gazing into the biggest and blackest hole I had ever seen, out of which the bats seemed literally to boil".

== First exploration ==
Standing at the entrance of the tunnel I could see ahead of me a darkness so absolutely black it seemed a solid.

— Jim White, Jim White's Own Story

A few days later, (Note: Cave History Update; April 27, 2005 paraphrases Jim White Jr. in saying that his father "... probably took about a month getting ready to go into the cave the first time".) he returned to the cave with some rope, fence wire and a hatchet. He cut wood from some nearby shrubs and assembled a makeshift ladder. He lowered the ladder into the opening and using a homemade kerosene lantern, descended approximately 50 feet (15 m) to the first serviceable ledge. He climbed down an additional 20 feet (6.1 m) to a floor. Using the "sickly glow" of his lantern, he made his way into the cave. He felt as if he "... was wandering into the very core of the Guadalupe Mountains."

After reaching a chamber, he noted two tunnels leading off in opposite directions, one downward and to the right and one, more level, to the left. He decided to go left first and discovered the Bat Cave. He explored it for a while then proceeded down the other tunnel.

I followed on until I found myself in a wilderness of mighty stalagmites. It was the first cave I was ever in, and the first stalagmites I had ever seen, but instinctively I knew, for some intuitive reason, that there was no other scene in the world which could be justly compared with my surroundings.

By the time he reached the first formations, he had "... crept cat-like across a dozen dangerous ledges and past many tremendous openings ...". He saw more stalagmites, "... each seemingly larger and more beautifully formed than the ones I'd passed". He encountered chandeliers, stalactites, soda straws, flowstone, pools of water, rimstone dams and other formations. He dropped rocks into pits to determine their depth. He rolled one boulder into a pit and it fell for a couple of seconds and then "... kept rolling and rolling until its sound became an echo".

Then the light from his homemade kerosene lantern went out. The darkness seemed to smother him. Jim described the incident by saying, "It seemed as though a million tons of black wool descended upon me."

After refilling his lantern from a spare canteen of oil, he made his way back to the surface.

== The kid ==
... it would be impossible to even exaggerate our experiences during those three days.

— Jim White, Jim White's Own Story

Jim returned to the cave with a 15-year-old Mexican boy. His real name is unknown—he was known only as Muchacho, The Kid, or Pothead.

Five days after Jim's first trip into the cave, he and Pothead made an exploration. Carrying food, water, fuel and homemade torches, they began an exploration which lasted three days. They took a large ball of string to use to ensure their exit.

They explored approximately the same areas of the cave that the modern tourist trails cover including the Big Room, and the King's Palace and Queen's Chamber.

== Jim White's Own Story ==
The original record of the early events surrounding Jim White and Carlsbad Caverns comes from a booklet, self-published in 1932, titled Jim White's Own Story. The booklet was ghost written by Frank Ernest Nicholson in exchange for payment of a boarding bill. Nicholson was a journalist and led the ill-fated Nicholson Expedition to Carlsbad Caverns in 1929 sponsored by The New York Times.

Jim White had a permit with the National Park Service to sell the booklet from the Underground Lunchroom. Dennis Chavez, a U.S. Senator, helped obtain the permit by putting pressure on the park. At first, the agreement was oral but later, it became more formal. Sales of the booklet ceased two months after Jim White's death.

== The guano bucket ==
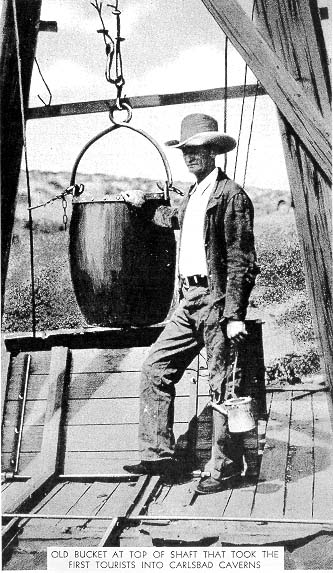
Jim White standing next to a guano bucket atop the guano shaft at Carlsbad Caverns. The bucket was used to carry the first tourists into the caverns. He is holding one of his homemade kerosene lanterns.

One of the early guano companies dug a shaft making a more direct route to the guano deposits in the Bat Cave. It was serviced by a large iron bucket operated by a gasoline winch. This system was used to haul bags of guano out of the cave for use as fertilizer in places like the California fruit orchards. The guano was sold for 90 dollars a ton (2,000 pounds (910 kg)). Jim White used the guano bucket to transport hundreds of tourists into and out of the cave.

The original guano bucket was used as the stand in the Underground Lunchroom from which Jim White sold his booklets. Jim White Jr. later gave it to a man named Charlie Dugger and it was stored in his garage.

== Family ==
Jim White married Fannie Hill on January 1, 1912. She was eighteen and a longtime friend from the town of Lonetree. Their first house was provided by the guano company. It was a "... two room shack, set practically on top of the small bat cave, which was several hundred yards from the main cavern entrance." Jim and Fannie had a son named James Larkin White, Jr., on March 23, 1919. Jim moved his family into a four-room house provided by the guano company when Jim Jr. was about two years old. It was a few hundred feet farther from the cave entrance. They did not have running water at the house; instead, Jim would take a burro to Oak Springs and let it loose to find its way home with two cans of water on its back. Fannie would empty the water into a barrel when the burro returned. They did not get electricity until 1929 or 1930 and it was only on during the day.

== Death ==
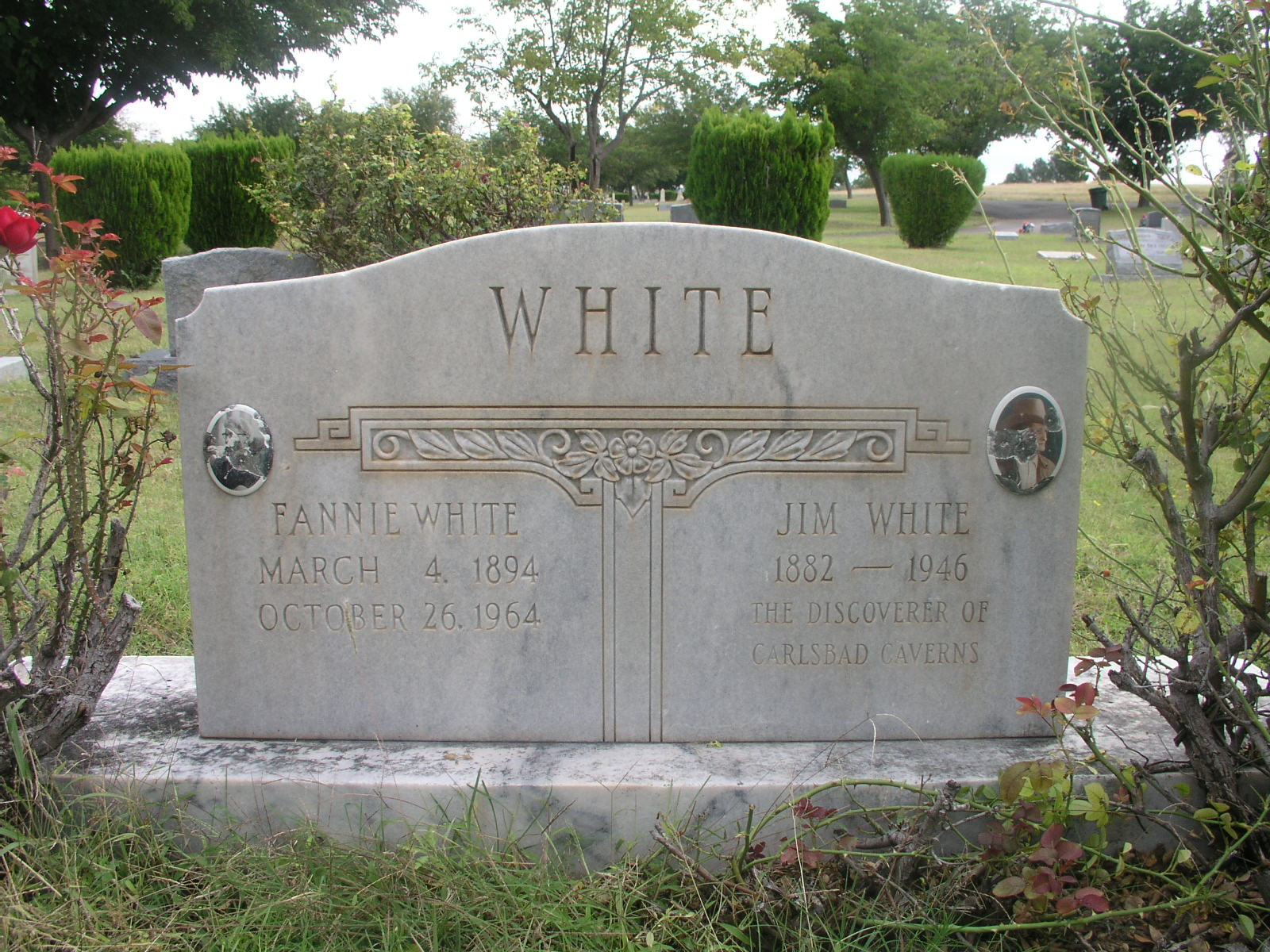
Headstone of Jim and Fannie White from Carlsbad Municipal Cemetery, Carlsbad, New Mexico, October 12, 2008.

He discovered the Caverns in the good old American way of adventuring.

— Senator Dennis Chavez of New Mexico, One Man's Dream

Jim White died on April 26, 1946, in a hospital in Carlsbad, New Mexico, at the age of 63. He suffered from Bright's disease and died of coronary thrombosis. He told a reporter for the Carlsbad Current-Argus, two days before his death, that he felt well but was not ready to ride a horse to California, again. He is buried alongside his wife, Fannie, at Carlsbad Municipal Cemetery in Carlsbad. The epitaph on his tombstone reads "The Discoverer of Carlsbad Caverns".

After his death, a movement was started to have a statue of Jim White erected at the cavern entrance. Instead, a bronze plaque was placed in the lobby at the park visitor center which reads:

JAMES L. WHITE
1882-1946
Beginning in 1901, Jim White made the first known
extensive explorations of the Carlsbad Caverns.
He was chiefly responsible for bringing the attention
of the public, scientific groups and the federal
government to the importance and significance
of the caverns.

In 2011, a large, bronze statue of Jim White descending a wire ladder was unveiled at the National Cave and Karst Research Institute (NCKRI) building in Carlsbad, New Mexico.

== Chronology ==
- 1882 (July 11): Jim White is born in Mason County, Texas.
- 1888: development of the town of Eddy (Carlsbad today) begins.
- 1892: Jim White moves to New Mexico Territory just a few miles from Eddy.
- 1893: the town of Eddy is incorporated.
- 1895: Jim White's family moves to join him in New Mexico. (Note: Cavern's Chronology says that Jim White moved with his family to the New Mexico Territory in 1892. One Man's Dream says that his father took him to the territory and left him in 1892 and the family came to join him three years later.)
- 1898: Jim White first enters the cave. (Note: Jim White's Own Story and One Man's Dream say the date of first entry into the cave was 1901; but, Jim admits that he is not certain. Caverns Chronology puts the date at 1898 based on an inscription found in the cave in the 1980s which reads "1898 J. White".)
- 1899: the citizens of Eddy vote to rename the town to Carlsbad.
- 1912 (January 6): New Mexico becomes a state.
- 1915 – 1918: Ray V. Davis takes the first photographs from inside the caverns.
- 1918: New Mexico Governor W. E. Lindsay incorporated the town of Carlsbad.
- 1923: Ray V. Davis caverns photographs are first published in the New York Times.
- 1923 (April 6 – May 8): Jim White guides Robert Holley of the United States General Land Office and Ray V. Davis (photographer) to survey and map the caverns. Holley recommends the establishment of a National Monument.
- 1923 (October 25): Carlsbad Cave National Monument is established.
- 1923 – 1927: W. F. McIlvain supervises Jim White and Willis T. Lee in the construction of the first trails, stairs and the installation of the first lights.
- 1924 (March 20 – September 15): the National Geographic Society sponsors Willis T. Lee, guided by Jim White, to explore the caverns.
- 1925: entrance staircase is installed replacing the guano bucket as the means to enter the cave.
- 1926 (May 1): Jim White becomes Chief Ranger of Carlsbad Cave National Monument.
- 1928 (September): Amelia Earhart visits the caverns.
- 1929 (May 5): Jim White resigns as Chief Ranger.
- 1930 (May 14): Congress establishes Carlsbad Caverns National Park.
- 1937 (February 9): Jim White begins selling Jim White's Own Story in the cave.
- 1946 (April 26): Jim White dies in Carlsbad.
