= James White (archdeacon of Armagh) =

Irish Roman Catholic cleric

James White was Archdeacon of Armagh from 1497 until his death in 1530: he was also Prebendary of Kene in Armagh cathedral.
