= Jim White (footballer, born 1878) =

Australian rules footballer

Personal information
- Full name: James Augustine White
- Born: 27 January 1878; Bungaree, Victoria
- Died: 19 January 1956 (aged 77); Ballarat, Victoria
- Original team: Preston
- Height: 170 cm (5 ft 7 in)

Playing career^{1}
| Years | Club | Games (Goals) |
| 1897 | Essendon | 1 (1) |
- ^{1} Playing statistics correct to the end of 1897.

James Augustine White (27 January 1878 – 19 January 1956) was an Australian rules footballer who played with Essendon in the Victorian Football League (VFL).
