= James Clarke White (neurosurgeon) =

American surgeon

- Died: 1981
- Education: Harvard Medical School
- Medical career
- Profession: Doctor
- Field: Neurosurgery

James Clarke White (died 1981) was an American neurosurgeon, specialist in the surgical control of pain, and professor at Harvard Medical School.

White graduated from Harvard Medical School in 1923. His grandfather, James Clarke White (dermatologist), was also a professor at Harvard Medical School, where he founded the dermatology department, and his father, James J. White, had been chairman of that department.
