= James Clarke White (dermatologist) =

American physician

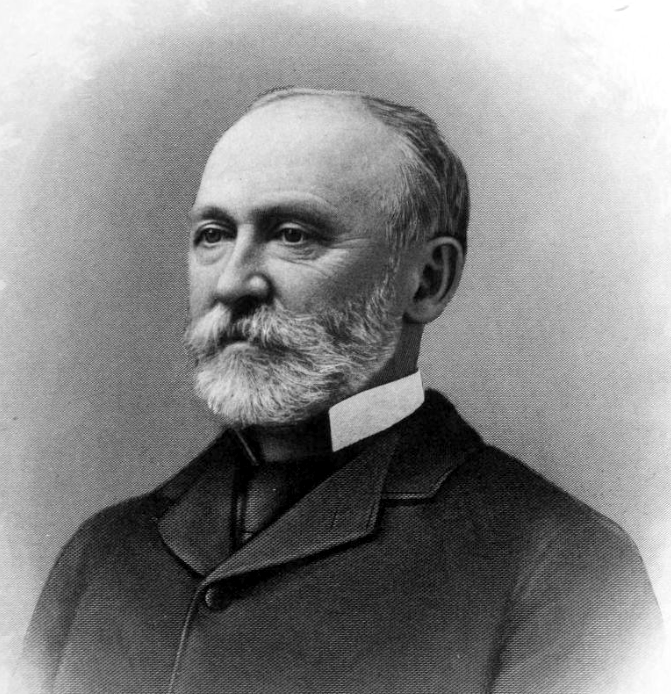
- Born: July 7, 1833; Belfast, Maine
- Died: January 6, 1916 (aged 82); Boston, Massachusetts
- Education: Harvard Medical School
- Occupations: Dermatologist, professor
- Spouse: Martha Anna Ellis (m. 1862)

Signature
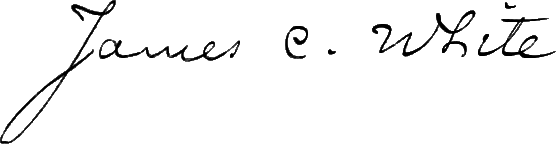

James Clarke White (1833–1916) was an American dermatologist and professor at Harvard Medical School. He was the first professor of dermatology in the United States.

== Contributions ==
White is one of the namesakes of Darier–White disease, having discovered it independently of Ferdinand-Jean Darier. He also wrote a book, Dermatitis Venenata, published in 1887.

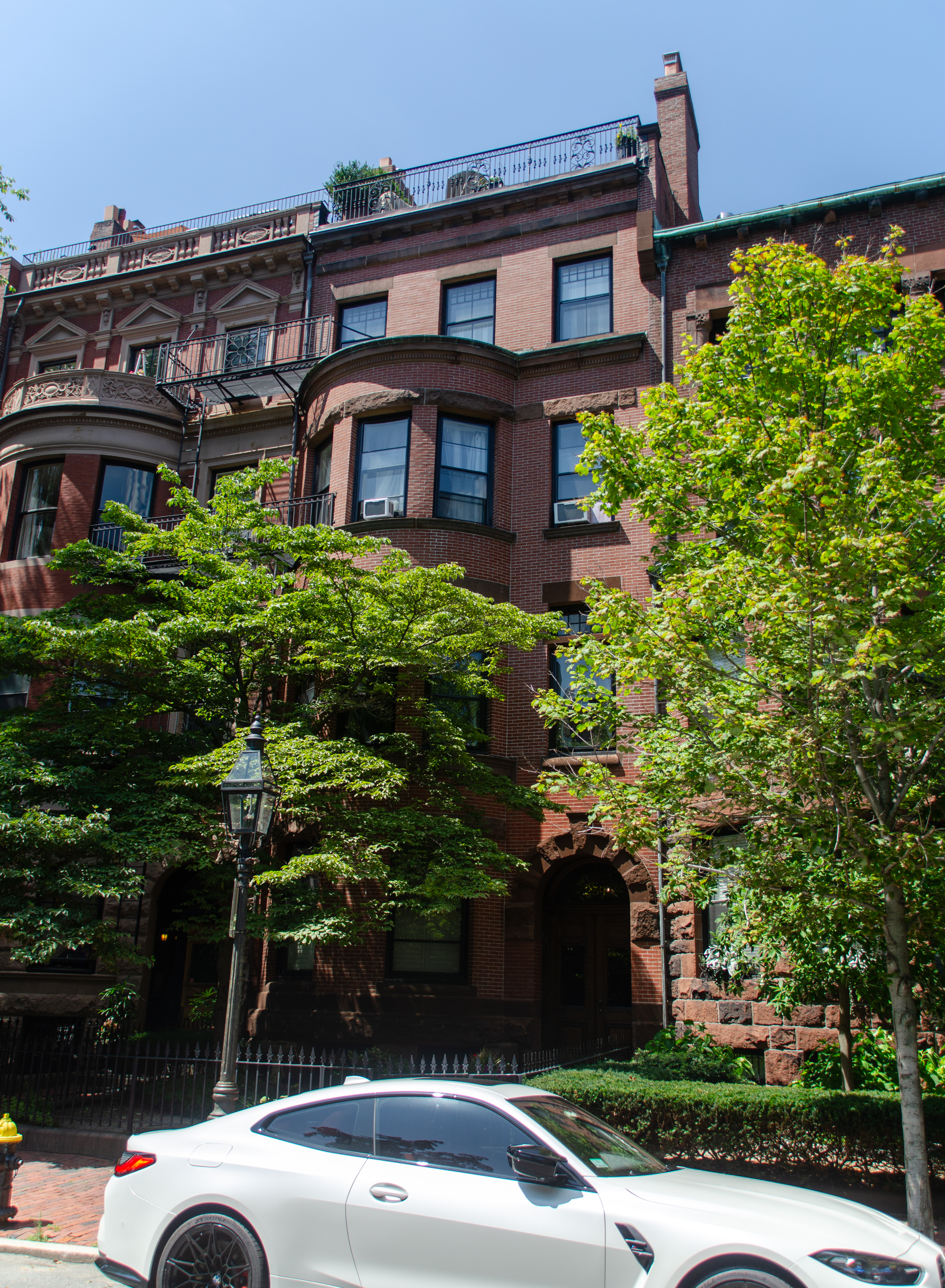
White's Back Bay residence, designed by Peabody & Stearns

== Personal life ==
White was born on July 7, 1833, in Belfast, Maine; his father was a shipbuilder, banker and a father of seven. Although his family was mostly of Scotch-Irish descent, one of his great-grandmothers came to the US from Vienna. He was a Unitarian, for most of his life attending the First Church in Boston.

He married Martha Anna Ellis in 1862; they had three sons. His son Charles J. White took over his medical practice in 1914, and became Edivard Wigylesicorth Professor of Dermatology at Harvard and chair of the Harvard dermatology department. His grandson, James Clarke White, was also a professor at Harvard Medical School.

He died at his home in Boston on January 6, 1916.

== Education and career ==
White entered Harvard College in 1849, at age 16, and graduated in 1853, then studied medicine at Harvard Medical School; this was followed by a further year of medical study in Vienna in 1856–57.

While operating a private medical practice and visiting at Massachusetts General Hospital, he became an instructor at Harvard in 1858, and an adjunct professor in 1866. In 1871 he was given a chair as professor of dermatology, the first such position in the US. He retired as a professor emeritus in 1902.

== Recognition and service ==
He was elected as a fellow of the American Academy of Arts and Sciences in 1866, became the founding president of the American Dermatological Association in 1877, and was re-elected as president two more times, in 1897 and 1907. He was also one of the founder of the Boston Society of Natural History and acted as its anatomy curator.

He was a corresponding or honorary member of the dermatological societies of Argentina, France, Italy, Berlin, London, New York, and Vienna.
