= Small Beer Press =

Fiction publisher

- Founded: 2000
- Founder: Gavin Grant and Kelly Link
- Country of origin: United States
- Headquarters location: Northampton, Massachusetts
- Distribution: Consortium
- Imprints: Big Mouth House, Peapod Classics
- Official website: www.smallbeerpress.com

Small Beer Press is a publisher of fantasy and literary fiction, based in Northampton, Massachusetts. It was founded by Gavin Grant and Kelly Link in 2000 and publishes novels, collections, and anthologies. It also publishes the zine Lady Churchill's Rosebud Wristlet, chapbooks, the Peapod Classics line of classic reprints, and limited edition printings of certain titles. The Press has been acknowledged for its children and young-adult publications, and as a leading small-publisher of literary science-fiction and fantasy.

Authors published to date include Kate Wilhelm, John Crowley, Sean Stewart, Maureen F. McHugh, Benjamin Rosenbaum, Kelly Link, Carol Emshwiller, Ray Vukcevich, Joan Aiken, Howard Waldrop, Ellen Kushner, John Kessel, and Alan DeNiro.

In March 2023, Small Beer Press closed to book submissions, due to health complications Grant experienced as a result of COVID-19. The Press's website announced in February 2024 that it is "unlikely" that submissions will reopen.

== Imprints ==
Big Mouth House – Created in 2008 to publish works of fiction for all ages. The imprint first began publishing with the appearance of a complete collection of celebrated English novelist Joan Aiken's Armitage Family short stories, originally published separately between 1953 and 1984.

Peapod Classics – Created in 2004 to reprint classic works of fiction. To date the imprint has published three volumes, debuting with the influential first novel of Carol Emshwiller, Carmen Dog, a feminist work first published by Mercury House in 1990, and out of print since then.

== Small Beer Press publications ==
=== 2000 ===
- 4 Stories, Kelly Link
- Five Forbidden Things, by Dora Knez

=== 2001 ===
- Stranger Things Happen, by Kelly Link

=== 2002 ===
- Lord Stink & Other Stories, by Judith Berman
- The Mount, by Carol Emshwiller
- Report to the Men's Club and Other Stories, by Carol Emshwiller
- Rossetti Song: Four Stories, by Alex Irvine
- Meet Me in the Moon Room, by Ray Vukcevich

=== 2003 ===
- Howard Waldrop Interview (CD Recording), Conducted by Ellen Datrow
- Kalpa Imperial: The Great Empire That Never Was, by Angélica Gorodischer
- Trampoline: An Anthology, Edited by Kelly Link
- Foreigners and Other Faces, by Mark Rich
- Other Cities, by Benjamin Rosenbaum
- Bittersweet Creek, by Christopher Rowe

=== 2004 ===
- Horses Blow Up Dog City & Other Stories, by Richard Butner
- Carmen Dog, by Carol Emshwiller
- Trash Sex Magic, by Jennifer Stevenson
- Perfect Circle, by Sean Stewart

=== 2005 ===
- Magic for Beginners, by Kelly Link
- Travel Light, by Naomi Mitchison
- Mockingbird, by Sean Stewart
- Storyteller: Writing Lessons and More from 27 Years of the Clarion Writers' Workshop, by Kate Wilhelm

=== 2006 ===
- Skinny Dipping in the Lake of the Dead, by Alan DeNiro
- The Privilege of the Sword, by Ellen Kushner
- Mothers & Other Monsters, by Maureen F. McHugh
- Howard Who?, by Howard Waldrop

=== 2007 ===
- Generation Loss, by Elizabeth Hand
- Water Logic, by Laurie J. Marks
- Interfictions: An Anthology of Interstitial Writing, Edited by Delia Sherman and Theodora Goss

=== 2008 ===
- The Serial Garden: The Complete Armitage Family Stories, by Joan Aiken
- Endless Things: An Ægypt Novel, by John Crowley
- The Baum Plan for Financial Independence and Other Stories, by John Kessel
- The Ant King and Other Stories, by Benjamin Rosenbaum
- The King's Last Song, by Geoff Ryman

=== 2009 ===
- Clouds & Ashes, by Greer Gilman
- Couch, by Benjamin Parzybok
- Interfictions II: The Second Anthology of Interstitial Writing, Edited by Delia Sherman and Christopher Barzak
- A Working Writer's Daily Planner 2010: Your Year in Writing, by Small Beer Press

=== 2012 ===
- Fountain of Age Stories by Nancy Kress, a collection of nine stories, including Fountain of Age
- At the Mouth of the River of Bees Stories by Kij Johnson, a collection of 16 stories, including 26 Monkeys, Also the Abyss, Spar, The Man Who Bridged the Mist, Ponies and The Evolution of Trickster Stories Among the Dogs of North Park After the Change

== Creative Commons Licensed Works ==
Small Beer Press maintains a collection of Creative Commons Licensed audiobooks, ebooks, and stories, in a variety of formats.
