= Diversicon =

Science fiction convention in Minneapolis, Minnesota

- Status: Active
- Genre: Speculative fiction
- Venue: Best Western Bandana Square
- Location: Saint Paul, Minnesota
- Country: United States
- Inaugurated: 1992
- Organizer: SF Minnesota
- Filing status: Non-profit
- Website: http://www.diversicon.org

Diversicon is an annual speculative fiction (science fiction and fantasy, or SF) convention held in July or August in the Minneapolis-Saint Paul, Minnesota area. Diversicon provides programming and social opportunities to encourage the multicultural, multimedia exploration and celebration of SF by those within and outside of the traditional SF community. Diversicon includes both live and posthumous guests. It is sponsored by SF Minnesota.

== Programming ==
Diversicon's programming—typically three simultaneous tracks—focuses on literature but also includes items related to film, TV, comics, art, science, and other subjects. Science fiction, fantasy, horror, and slipstream/magic realism genres are all represented.

Programming topics are solicited from preregistered attendees. Programming items often focus on authors and/or fictional characters from underrepresented groups; how work deals with themes of race, ethnicity, class, gender, religion, sexual orientation, dis/ability, and other definitions of "difference"; and how contemporary issues around diversity influence the reading and writing of SF.

Most programming items are panel discussions. In addition, guests of honor are interviewed and participate in Q&A with the audience. Other formats include roundtable discussions, film screenings, informational presentations/workshops, and concerts.

The convention includes an Art Show; displaying artists are encouraged to attend and be available to discuss their work with attendees. It also includes a Dealers' Room where various jewelry, books, magazines, clothing/accessories, and other items are for sale. The ConSuite is a room with comfortable, informal seating and light food and drink. Parties are held each evening.

In addition, there is an auction of speculative fiction books, collectibles, and other items to raise money for SF Minnesota.

== History ==
Diversicon is sponsored by SF Minnesota, a nonprofit organization. SF Minnesota was founded in February 1992 by a group that wanted to create a Twin Cities speculative fiction convention with a different tone and focus from what already existed. They decided that Diversicon would celebrate and explore the connections between speculative fiction (SF) and diversity, particularly in three areas:

- Cultural diversity. Slightly more than two thirds of Diversicon's guest professionals have been women. A number of guests have been persons of color. A number of guests have been openly gay, lesbian, or bisexual and/or have written SF that explores issues of alternate sexuality.
- Diversity of fan groups. Diversicon would be openly welcoming, friendly, and respectful to the wide range of SF-related organizations in the area, ranging from book clubs to writing groups, Star Trek and anime clubs, creative anachronists and futurist organizations, and anyone else who shared an interest in diversity and the imagination.
- Diversity in media. Recognizing that different people come to SF through different paths, Diversicon would be inclusive of all media. In addition to a strong core of literary programming—including items for both writers and readers—the convention also includes a rich sampling of panels and discussions related to SF in film, TV, graphic arts, and other media as well as speculative science.

Diversicon 1 premiered in June 1993 and subsequently settled on August as its regular month. The convention hosted the James Tiptree, Jr. Award in 2000.

== Guest authors, artists, editors, and fans ==
Diversicon 32 (2025)

- Lyda Morehouse Writer
- Naomi Kritzer Writer

Diversicon 31 (2024, in conjunction with Mythcon 53)

- Eleanor Arnason Writer
- Brian Attebery Myth and Fantasy Scholar

Diversicon 30 (2023)

- Steven Barnes Writer
- Mark Rich Poet, Writer

Diversicon 29 (2022)

- T. Aaron Cisco Writer
- Sybil Smith Fan

Diversicon 28 (postponed from 2020 to 2021)

- Michael Merriam Writer
- Abra Staffin-Wiebe Writer

Diversicon 27 (2019)

- Nisi Shawl Writer
- Ben Huset Space evangelist

Diversicon 26 (2018)

- Charlie Jane Anders Writer
- Bryan Thao Worra Poet and writer
- Ursula Murray Husted Artist

Diversicon 25 (2017)

- Melissa Scott Writer
- Eleanor Arnason Writer

Diversicon 24 (2016)

- Jessica Amanda Salmonson Writer
- Naomi Kritzer Writer

Diversicon 23 (2015)

- Ytasha L. Womack SF writer and filmmaker
- Rob Callahan SF writer and journalist

Diversicon 22 (2014)

- Carolyn Ives Gilman SF writer
- Terry A. Garey SF writer and editor

Diversicon 21 (2013)

- Roy C. Booth SF writer, http://www.salgado-reyes.com/roy-c-booth/
- Jack McDevitt SF writer, https://www.jackmcdevitt.com
- Catherine Lundoff Fantasy writer, http://www.catherinelundoff.com

Diversicon 20 (2012)

- Steven Barnes SF writer, http://diamondhour.com/
- Tananarive Due Writer, http://www.tananarivedue.com/

Diversicon 19 (2011)

- David Hartwell SF editor, https://www.davidghartwell.com/
- John Calvin Rezmerski Poet and writer, http://authors.wizards.pro/authors/writers/john-calvin-rezmerski
- Lyda Morehouse SF writer and mystery writer "Tate Hallaway", http://www.lydamorehouse.com/
- Joan Slonczewski Scientist and writer, https://biology.kenyon.edu/slonc/slonc.htm

Diversicon 18 (2010)

- William F. Wu short story and science fiction writer, https://www.williamfwu.com
- Rob Chilson science fiction writer, http://www.robshilson.com

Diversicon 17 (2009)

- Kay Kenyon- novelist in science fiction genre
- Michael Levy college professor and SF/fantasy reviewer
- Sandra Lindow SF poet

Diversicon 16 (2008)

- Anne Frasier—feminist novelist in science fiction, horror, mystery, and romance genres
- Nnedi Okorafor—Nigerian-American (Igbo) author, playwright, journalist, and teacher

Diversicon 15 (2007)

- Andrea Hairston—feminist, African-American novelist and playwright; professor of Afro-American studies and theater at Smith College in Northampton, Massachusetts
- Christopher Jones—comics and graphic novels artist
- Melissa S. Kaercher—comics and graphic novels artist

Diversicon 14 (2006)

- Kelly Link—feminist author of slipstream/interstitial work, editor, and teacher; winner of the World Fantasy Award, Nebula Award, and James Tiptree, Jr. Award among other honors
- Bryan Thao Worra—Laotian American author, journalist, and community activist

Diversicon 13 (2005)

- Sheree R. Thomas—African-American author and journalist, editor, artist, and teacher; winner of two World Fantasy Awards among other honors
- Minister Faust (a.k.a. Malcolm Azania)—Black Canadian author whose work includes a novel making in-depth use of African mythology, broadcaster, actor, teacher, and community activist

Diversicon 12 (2004)

- S. P. Somtow (a.k.a. Somtow Papinian Sucharitkul)—Thai author, filmmaker, composer, and artistic director of the Bangkok Opera and the Siam Philharmonic Orchestra; past president of the Horror Writers Association
- Mark Rich—Asian-American author, journalist, artist, and musician; numerous Rhysling Award nominations for speculative poetry

Diversicon 11 (2003)

- Melissa Scott—lesbian, feminist author and teacher; winner of the John W. Campbell and several Lambda Literary Awards
- Martha A. Hood— feminist author and longtime Diversicon panel participant

Diversicon 10 (2002)

- Steven Barnes—African-American bestselling novelist and TV writer, martial artist, and Lifewriting teacher
- Tananarive Due—African-American novelist and teacher; musician and a member of Stephen King's author band; winner of the American Book Award and New Voice in Literature Award among other honors

Diversicon 9 (2001)

- Stephen Pagel—founder and editor of Meisha Merlin Publishing and co-editor of the GLBT Bending the Landscape anthology series with Nicola Griffith; winner of Lambda Literary Award and World Fantasy Award among other honors
- Keith Hartman—author of fiction and nonfiction exploring GLBT themes including "gay, multi-species SF-horror- detective novels," choreographer, and actor; winner of two Gaylactic Spectrum Awards among other honors

Diversicon 8 (2000)

- Lois McMaster Bujold—bestselling author; winner of the Locus, Nebula, Hugo, and Mythopoeic Awards among other honors
- Laurel Winter—feminist author, speaker, and energy medicine practitioner; winner of the World Fantasy and Rhysling Awards and recipient of a McKnight Artist Fellowship among other honors
- Suzy McKee Charnas—feminist author and teacher; winner of the Nebula, Hugo, and James Tiptree, Jr. Awards and a James Tiptree Jr. Retrospective Award among other honors; inducted into the Gaylactic Spectrum Hall of Fame

Diversicon 7 (1999)

- L. A. Graf (a.k.a. Julia Ecklar and Karen Rose Cercone)—Julia Ecklar is an author and musician and winner of the John W. Campbell Award for Best New Writer; Karen Rose Cercone is an author and a professor of geoscience.
- Nalo Hopkinson—queer Caribbean-Canadian author, editor, and teacher; winner of the Prix Aurora, Sunburst, John W. Campbell, Locus, and Gaylactic Spectrum Awards among other honors.

Diversicon 6 (1998)

- Karen Joy Fowler—feminist author and teacher; winner of the Nebula Award, World Fantasy Award, John W. Campbell Award for Best New Writer, and Commonwealth Award for Best First Novel among other honors; co-founder with Pat Murphy of the James Tiptree, Jr. Award
- Pat Murphy—feminist author and teacher; winner of the Nebula, World Fantasy, Philip K. Dick Award, and Theodore Sturgeon Memorial Awards; co-founder with Karen Joy Fowler of the James Tiptree, Jr. Award

Diversicon 5 (1997)

- Tanya Huff—prolific lesbian, feminist Canadian author, some of whose novels are the basis for the TV series Blood Ties
- Pam Keesey—lesbian, feminist author, editor, technical writer, and horror scholar and founder of MonsterZine.com

Diversicon 4 (1996)

- Maureen F. McHugh—feminist author and teacher; winner of the Hugo, Locus, Lambda Literary, and James Tiptree, Jr. Awards
- Doug Friauf (July 8, 1955 – April 25, 2007)—A longtime avid SF fan, film and book reviewer, Shockwave Radio Theater performer, and "Minneapolis fandom's rolling ambassador" to the international SF community, Doug Friauf died due to complications from muscular dystrophy.
- Rodger Gerberding—artist, longtime art director for Tales of the Unanticipated, and disabled artists activist

Diversicon 3 (1995)

- L. A. Taylor, a.k.a. Laurie Aylama Taylor Sparer (September 3, 1939 – May 29, 1996)—Canadian author and world traveler
- Joan Slonczewski—author and professor of biology
- Earl C. Joseph—technical computing expert, coiner of terms computer architecture and smart machines, holder of three patents, and professional futurist

Diversicon 2 (1994)

- Paul Park—trailblazing author of "humanist" SF and teacher
- Bruce Hyde—actor, including role of Lt. Kevin Riley in the original Star Trek, and chair of the Theater, Film Studies, and Dance department at St. Cloud State University
- Sybil M. Smith—African-American fan with a special interest in slash; 2007 president of SF Minnesota

Diversicon 1 (1993)

- Eleanor Arnason—feminist author; winner of the James Tiptree, Jr. Award, Mythopoeic Fantasy, and Minnesota Book Awards
- A. C. Crispin—bestselling author, teacher, and past vice president of Science Fiction and Fantasy Writers of America (SFWA) and founder of SFWA's Committee on Writing Scams; recipient of the 2004 Service to SFWA Award
- Ruth Berman—author, editor, teacher, and translator and founding member of The Rivendell Group and the Minnesota Science Fiction Society (Minn-StF); winner of the Rhysling Award

== See also ==
- Carl Brandon Society
- GalactiCon
- Gaylaxicon
- James Tiptree, Jr. Award
- WisCon
