= Nebula Awards Showcase 2013 =

2013 anthology of science fiction short works

- Cover of first edition
- Editor: Catherine Asaro
- Cover artist: Julie Dillon
- Language: English
- Series: Nebula Awards Showcase
- Genre: Science fiction
- Publisher: Pyr
- Publication date: 2013
- Publication place: United States
- Media type: Print (paperback)
- Pages: 428
- ISBN: 978-1-61614-783-9
- OCLC: 818738083
- Preceded by: Nebula Awards Showcase 2012
- Followed by: Nebula Awards Showcase 2014

Nebula Awards Showcase 2013 is an anthology of science fiction short works edited by Catherine Asaro. It was first published in trade paperback by Pyr in May 2013.

== Summary ==
The book collects pieces that won or were nominated for the Nebula Awards for best novel, novella, novelette and short story for the year 2011 (presented in 2012), as well as the novel that won the Andre Norton Award for that year, an early story by 2011 Damon Knight Memorial Grand Master Award winner Connie Willis, nonfiction pieces related to the awards, and the two Rhysling Award-winning poems for 2011, together with an introduction by the editor. The pieces winning the Best Novel and Andre Norton awards are represented by excerpts. Not all nominees for the various awards are included.

== Contents ==
- "A Harmony of Thoughts" [introduction] (Catherine Asaro)
- "The Paper Menagerie" [Best Short Story winner, 2011] (Ken Liu)
- "The Ice Owl" [Best Novella nominee, 2011] (Carolyn Ives Gilman)
- "Ado" [short story] (Connie Willis)
- "The Migratory Pattern of Dancers" [Best Novelette nominee, 2011] (Katherine Sparrow)
- "Peach-Creamed Honey" [Rhysling Award for Short Poem, 2011] (Amal El-Mohtar)
- "The Axiom of Choice" [Best Short Story nominee, 2011] (David W. Goldman)
- "Club Story" [essay] (John Clute)
- "What We Found" [Best Novelette winner, 2011] (Geoff Ryman)
- Among Others (excerpt) [Best Novel winner, 2011] (Jo Walton)
- "Movement" [Best Short Story nominee, 2011] (Nancy Fulda)
- "Sauerkraut Station" [Best Novelette nominee, 2011] (Ferrett Steinmetz)
- "The Cartographer Wasps and the Anarchist Bees" [Best Short Story nominee, 2011] (E. Lily Yu)
- "Ray of Light" [Best Novelette nominee, 2011] (Brad R. Torgersen)
- The Freedom Maze (excerpt) [Andre Norton Award winner, 2011] (Delia Sherman)
- "The Sea King's Second Bride" [Rhysling Award for Long Poem, 2011] (C. S. E. Cooney)
- "The Man Who Bridged the Mist" [Best Novella winner, 2011] (Kij Johnson)
- "2012 Nebula Awards Winners, Nominees, and Honorees"
- "Past Nebula Awards Winners"
- "About the Cover Artist"
- "About the Editor"

== Reception ==
Kirkus Reviews calls the collection "[e]ssential fare for short story aficionados, even though some of the contents have appeared in other collections." It goes on to discuss several of the included pieces briefly, singling out those of Liu, Johnson, Ryman, Willis, and Yu for particular praise.

Ryder Miller in the Portland Book Review writes that "The Nebula, despite the recent proliferation of new awards, has remained a stalwart guide to what the field aspires to be. One can also get a sense of how the field has changed with recent works veering off into the fantastic in this Showcase." While regretting the dearth of such traditional themes as "interstellar travel, journeys in time and encounters with extraterrestrials [and] the dream of a clear cut divide between good and evil," he notes the emergence in the anthology of "new directions and genre hybrids [and] some interesting literary stories requiring a close or second reading [that] seem more appropriate for more mature audiences, but maybe one should not underestimate the young." He notes the presence of "[s]ome big names" along with "new writers and disparate voices" and finds some of the pieces "oceanic, rather than cosmic." He concludes that while "[o]ne is not likely to enjoy everything, ... there is a fair bit to be impressed by."

The anthology was also reviewed by Wendy Bousfield in SFRA Review no. 305 Summer 2013, Don Sakers in Analog Science Fiction and Fact, October 2013, and Cherith Baldry in Vector 274, Winter 2013.
