= SF Minnesota =

American nonprofit organization

SF Minnesota logo

SF Minnesota (not to be confused with SF-Finn) is a nonprofit organization dedicated to speculative fiction (science fiction and fantasy, or SF) education. Founded in February 1992 in Minneapolis/St. Paul, Minnesota, it describes itself as "a multicultural, multimedia organization".

== Projects ==
SF Minnesota sponsors several projects:

- Diversicon—an annual convention with programming exploring the diversity of humanity and the diversity of artistic expression within the realm of speculative fiction.
- Arcana- an annual convention of dark fantasy.
- Annual Classic Horror Films Party—a screening of about a half-dozen horror films with liner notes; free and open to the public.
- Speculations Reading Series at DreamHaven Books in Minneapolis—part of S.A.S.E.: The Write Place's Carol Connolly Readings.
- Gordon R. Dickson Fund for Clarion West students—SF Minnesota makes donations to this fund.
- Tales of the Unanticipated—SF Minnesota makes donations to this literary speculative fiction magazine/anthology.

== Officers ==
2009 officers: Sybil Smith, President; Scott Lohman; and Bryan Thao Worra.
