= Fudoki (novel) =

2003 novel by Kij Johnson

- Author: Kij Johnson
- Publisher: Tor Books
- Publication date: October 2003
- ISBN: 0-7653-0390-6

Fudoki is a 2003 novel by American writer Kij Johnson, a (stand-alone) sequel to The Fox Woman.

== Plot ==
Set in 12th-century Japan, it is narrated by Harueme, an unmarried dying princess in the Court of Emperor Sutoku, who gives her life story constrained as it has been by the privileges of her position. Interleaved with her own life account is a nested story drawing on elements of Japanese mythology she has written as escapism to her own frustrations. This is about the cat Kagaya-hime whose Fudoki of the title is taken to be the common narrative of cat clans which defines their shared reality. When Kagaya-hime's home, relatives and hence Fudoki are destroyed by a fire, she sets out on a journey into the unknown. She is transformed into a woman by gods to allow her to complete the journey, yet maintains cat-like behaviours and attitudes throughout. Finally reaching the end of Japan, she transforms back and becomes "The Cat Who Walked a Thousand Miles" to start a Fudoki of her own.

== Reviews ==
Publishers Weekly declared Fudoki one of the best science fiction/fantasy novels of 2003. It was a finalist for the 2003 James Tiptree Jr Memorial Award, the 2004 Mythopoeic Fantasy Award, and the 2004 World Fantasy Award—Novel.
