= Artesia High School =

Artesia High School may refer to:

- Artesia High School (New Mexico), Artesia, New Mexico
- Artesia High School (California), Lakewood, California
