= Peñasco Elementary School =

Peñasco Elementary School may refer to:

- Peñasco Elementary School - Chaves County (near Hope), New Mexico - Artesia Public Schools
- Peñasco Elementary School - Peñasco, New Mexico - Peñasco Independent School District
