= Street Books =

Mobile library in Portland, Oregon, United States

- Location: Portland, Oregon, United States
- Type: Mobile library
- Established: 2011

Other information
- Website: streetbooks.org

Street Books is a mobile library utilizing customized tricycles that serves homeless people in Portland, Oregon. It also serves low-income residents of the community, including those who are day laborers and immigrants. It was founded in June 2011 by Laura Moulton, an artist, writer, and writing teacher from Portland.

== History ==
Conceived as a time-bound art project, Street Books was initially funded with a $4,963, three-month "social practice" grant from Portland's Regional Arts & Culture Council. According to Moulton, the initial idea underlying the project was "that books and conversation about books, could be enriching and enlightening, and could transform time, especially for people living outside". Its mission is twofold: to "empower people on the streets through access to literature" and to "create a community of support for people living outside, through a shared love of books".

In 2011, Moulton began Street Books by taking 40–50 books to the Skidmore Fountain on Wednesdays and the South Park Blocks on Saturdays. Other locations ultimately frequented by the mobile library include Bud Clark Commons, the Right 2 Dream Too homeless camp, St. Francis Park, and the Willamette River waterfront. By 2014, Street Books had become a registered nonprofit organization with a board of directors, hosted its first fundraising event, and counted three salaried "street librarians" (including Moulton) in addition to regular volunteers. According to Moulton, Street Books "wasn't a service that could be suspended because an art project had come to an end". By June 2016, it employed six paid librarians and utilized two tricycles. Additional sources of funding for the mobile library have included a 2011 Kickstarter campaign, a $1,000 grant from the Awesome Foundation in 2014, and a grant from the Meyer Memorial Trust.

== Operation ==
Street Books uses library cards and traditional library pockets to keep track of its books, although it does not set or enforce due dates; patrons simply return the books at their leisure. According to Moulton, "people living outside might have bigger things to worry about than returning their books to the street library". Nevertheless, patrons do regularly return the books they check out. Additionally, patrons do not need to provide any form of identification or an address to loan books; all that is required to obtain a Street Books library card is to give one's name. In contrast, patrons of Portland's Multnomah County Library need to provide an address in order to acquire a library card.

Street Books serves the community from June to October of each year. By 2016, it had served more than 5,000 patrons. Moulton also invites patrons to be photographed with the books they check out, and then posts these images on a blog that documents the mobile library since its foundation.

Street Books curates and provides access to a diverse collection of books that span a wide range of genres. In August 2011, Moulton noted that Western fiction and the works of countercultural authors like Jack Kerouac and Ken Kesey were especially popular. In July 2016, fellow street librarian Diana Rempe observed that escapist and spiritual literature were also popular among patrons. Another strength of the collection is its coverage of regional authors, including Jim Lynch, Benjamin Parzybok, and Kevin Sampsell. The collection, which Moulton organizes during the winter, consists largely of paperback books donated by community members. Street Books will occasionally buy used books that are specifically requested by patrons, often from Powell's Books.
