= Ferrett Steinmetz =

Science fiction author

- Born: Norwalk, CT
- Occupation: Author
- Writing career
- Genre: speculative fiction
- Website: www.theferrett.com

Ferrett Steinmetz is the pen name of author William Steinmetz, who writes science fiction and urban fantasy and has been active since 2004.

== Biography ==
Steinmetz lives in Cleveland with his wife and dog.

== Literary career ==
Although he's been writing since about 1988, Steinmetz's literary career was "rebooted" by attending the 2008 Clarion Workshop, which "transformed [it] into something with intense focus ... and the ability to scale previously impossible publishing walls."

His work has appeared in various periodicals, webzines, podcasts and anthologies, including Andromeda Spaceways Inflight Magazine, Apex Magazine, Asimov's Science Fiction, Beneath Ceaseless Skies, Escape Pod, GUD, Nebula Awards Showcase 2013, Orson Scott Card's InterGalactic Medicine Show, PodCastle, Pseudopod, Shimmer, Three-lobed Burning Eye, and Uncanny Magazine.

His debut novel, Flex, appeared in March 2015 from Angry Robot Books. SFF World said of it "“Flex is an urban fantasy with a number of unique elements that should make it flare brightly in a crowded subgenre.” The book was followed by two sequels, The Flux, also in 2015, and Fix in 2016.

His 2019 novel The Sol Majestic was reviewed in The Wall Street Journal as an example of the sub-genre "hopepunk", and in the Washington Post as "science fiction for foodies." Reviewer Martin Cahill remarked "Steinmetz’s mastery of character is especially evident," and continued "The Sol Majestic reminds us, crucially, that science fiction doesn’t always have to be about spaceships or explosions, (though there are a few within these pages)."

=== Awards ===
Steinmetz's story “Sauerkraut Station” (Giganotosaurus, Nov. 2011) was nominated for the 2011 Nebula Award for best novelette.

== Bibliography ==
=== 'Mancer trilogy ===
- Flex (Angry Robot, 2015)
- The Flux (Angry Robot, 2015)
- Fix (Angry Robot, 2016)

=== Dragon Kings of Oklahoma ===
- Dragon Kings Of Oklahoma: A Backwoods Adventure (Kindle 2024)
- Fae Lords of Oklahoma: A Deep Woods Adventure (Kindle 2024)
- The Hippogriff Riders Of Oklahoma: A Creepy Woods Adventure (Kindle 2024)

=== Other novels ===
- The Uploaded (Angry Robot, 2017)
- The Sol Majestic (Tor Books, 2019)
- Automatic Reload (Tor Books, 2020)

=== Short fiction ===
- "More Than Human" (2004)
- "Listen" (2006) (as William Steinmetz)
- "The Sound of Gears" (2009)
- "Camera Obscured" (2009)
- "At the Unicorn Factory" (2009)
- "Suicide Notes, Written by an Alien Mind" (2009)
- "In the Land of the Deaf" (2009)
- "The Elderly Cyborg" (2009)
- "The Backdated Romance" (2010)
- "Home Despot" (2010)
- "In the Garden of Rust and Salt" (2010)
- "Under the Thumb of the Brain Patrol" (2010)
- "As Below, So Above" (2010)
- "Dead Prophecies" (2011)
- "A Window, Clear as a Mirror" (2011)
- "My Father's Wounds" (2011)
- "iTime" (2011)
- "Sauerkraut Station" (2011)
- "'Run,' Bakri Says" (2011)
- "Devour" (2012)
- "In the Unlikely Event" (2012)
- "Dead Merchandise" (2012)
- "Riding Atlas" (2012)
- "One-Hand Tantra" (2012)
- "Shoebox Heaven" (2013)
- "Shadow Transit" (2013)
- "Hollow as the World" (2013)
- "Black Swan Oracle" (2013)
- "The Sturdy Bookshelves of Pawel Oliszewski" (2013)
- "In Extremis" (2014)
- "The Bliss Machine" (2014)
- "The Cultist's Son" (2014)
- "Four Scenes from Wieczniak's Whisk-U-Away, and One Not" (2014)
- "Flex" (excerpt) (2015)
- "The Flux" (excerpt) (2015)
- "Rooms Formed of Neurons and Sex" (2016)
- "The Tangled Web" (2016)
- "Madness Is a Skill" (2019)
