= Ron Nelson (basketball) =

American basketball player (born 1946)

Personal information
- Born: October 7, 1946 (age 80)
- Listed height: 6 ft 2 in (1.88 m)
- Listed weight: 175 lb (79 kg)

Career information
- High school: Artesia (Artesia, New Mexico)
- College: New Mexico Military Institute (1964–1966); New Mexico (1966–1968)
- NBA draft: 1968: 3rd round, 26th overall pick
- Drafted by: Baltimore Bullets
- Position: Shooting guard
- Number: 11

Career history
- 1970–1971: The Floridians

Career highlights
- First-team All-WAC (1968)
- Stats at Basketball Reference

Ron Nelson (born October 7, 1946) is an American former basketball player who played briefly in the original American Basketball Association (ABA). He was drafted 26th overall in the 1968 NBA draft by the Baltimore Bullets, yet decided to return the University of New Mexico for a year to complete his degree and act as an assistant coach.

Nelson played college basketball at New Mexico Military Institute in Roswell, New Mexico and the University of New Mexico. For the two years that Nelson played at New Mexico, they were coined "two of the best teams in school history." In his first season the 1966-67 Lobos rose to third ranked in the nation. Nelson and the late ABA two-time ABA league MVP Mel Daniels made an unbeatable combo.

Nelson's senior season at UNM began with a 17–0 run and resulted in a WAC title and advancing to the NCAA Tournament for the first time in UNM history. He led the team averaging 19.5 points/game. He was then selected as a Helms All-American in addition to being first team All-WAC.He later went on to play for The Floridians of the ABA. He appeared in 59 games during the 1970–71 season, averaging 3.2 points per game.
