= Mantis Wives =

2012 weird fiction short story by Kij Johnson

"Mantis Wives" is a 2012 weird fiction short story by Kij Johnson. It was first published in Clarkesworld.

== Synopsis ==
Rather than a narrative, "Mantis Wives" is presented as various excerpts from a Kama Sutra-equivalent for a race of sapient praying mantises, where the females practice sexual cannibalism. Despite it no longer serving the purpose of supplying essential nutrition to the females for producing eggs, females and males still feel driven to kill and be killed in elaborate variations termed "arts".

== Reception ==
"Mantis Wives" was a finalist for the 2013 Hugo Award for Best Short Story. Rachel Swirsky described it as being "about the viciousness of love gone wrong". Cheryl Morgan noted that it is one of Johnson's stories of which there is "no way" that it can "be said to be in the real world, even when they are so obviously about it". Lois Tilton called it "memorably disturbing", and noted that, while the mantis males and females are able to communicate with each other, explicit informed consent does not play a part.
