= Anne Frasier =

American novelist

- Born: 1954 (age 71–72); Burlington, Iowa, U.S.
- Education: Artesia High School
- Occupation: Novelist
- Writing career
- Period: 1988–present
- Genres: Thriller, suspense, mystery, crime fiction, paranormal, horror, romance, memoir
- Website: www.annefrasier.com

Theresa Weir (born 1954), better known by her pen name Anne Frasier, is an American author of numerous genres.

== Biography ==
Anne Frasier was born in Burlington, Iowa and attended Artesia High School in Artesia, New Mexico. Her parents divorced when she was six years old. The next twelve years of her life were spent in poverty, moving to and from Florida, Iowa, California, Illinois, and New Mexico. After graduating she worked as a waitress, a factory worker at Albuquerque's Levi Strauss where she sewed the Levi's logo on the back pockets of jeans, followed by a secretarial position at Wally's LP Gas in Santa Fe, New Mexico. She has started writing in her early twenties.

At age 21 she married her late husband whom she had met while working at her uncle's bar in Illinois. After marrying, she and her husband, who had a background in agriculture, moved to an apple farm. In an interview with Huffpost Frasier stated how "[she] had this idealized notion of getting back to nature and the land. I imagined myself barefoot with a baby on my hip, raising crops and canning organic vegetables." However, she soon grew dispirited due to the ill effects of pesticides and the helplessness she experienced because of her inability to "[...] do anything about it".

Frasier credits these negative feelings, as well as general isolation, as the spark that prompted her to start writing genre fiction. As an unpublished author without college education, she did not know anything about submitting manuscripts. According to Frasier, she began mailing manuscripts to publishing house addresses she found in books. Her first sale was to the American publishing company Simon & Schuster; The Forever Man was published on April 28, 1988, by the Silhouette Book Publishing Division of Simon & Schuster, which specialised in romance novels. The Forever Man, which was published under the name Theresa Weir, is now out-of-print and has been removed from her bibliography on her official website, annefrasier.com.

After writing fiction spanning numerous genres for over 20 decades, she textualised her experience of American farm life during the 1980s in her memoir The Orchard. Additionally, her second memoir The Man Who Left chronicles her strained relationship to her father, who had left the family when she was five years old and later developed Alzheimers.

As of 2022, Frasier lives in Southern California with her dog and frequently shares insights into her personal life as well as her stance on environmentalism via Instagram. She has previously stated that she is "addicted" to Facebook and Instagram.

== Career ==
Since the publication of her first novel, The Forever Man in 1988, Frasier has written over 40 novels, novellas, short stories, and anthologies under both her real name, Theresa Weir, as well as her more commonly used pseudonym Anne Frasier. During her early career Frasier wrote exclusively under the name Theresa Weir and specialised in romance novels, such as her 1988 novel Amazon Lily, which won the Romantic Times Best New Adventure Writer Award and was a RITA finalist.

In the year 2002 her novel Hush was published. This was the first instance of her using the pen name Anne Frasier.

In 2014, Frasier stated in an interview that she has written so many different genres that her "[...] brand was diluted." In an earlier interview from 1998, she had already talked about taking an unconventional approach to writing romance fiction. This was due to the fact that, while writing, she did not adhere to the conventions of the romance genre but rather wrote what she thought herself and a potential reader would enjoy. According to Frasier this had led to a lack of success in finding a publisher for her book, Amazon Lily. According to publishers, her main hero was "unlikable" and therefore would not fare well on the market.

Even after the success of Amazon Lily, Frasier still was met with hostility from editors and publishers when querying her books. Her characterisation of dark subject matters such as traumatic experiences, eating disorders or phobias led to her publishers eventually asking her to "[...] remove the blood and bodies" from her books. Instead she decided to take the opposite approach and removed the romance elements. Her first psychological suspense novel Before I Wake was published on January 1, 2005, under the name Anne Frasier. She has continued to write romance novels under her real name, Theresa Weir, but has stated in 2016 that she considers herself a crime fiction writer first and foremost.

Frasier is a member of Sisters in Crime and International Thriller writers. She served as a hardcover judge for the Thriller category presented by International Thriller writers, and was a guest of honour at the Diversicon 16 mystery and science fiction conference held in Minneapolis in 2008. Additionally, she was a judge in the International Thriller Writer's 2005 Best Novel contest.

Her titles have been translated in over 20 languages.

She credits Dr. Seuss, Night of the Living Dead, Texas Chainsaw Massacre, Nosferatu, as well as the works of Alfred Hitchcock and other black and white horror movies as influences on her career as an author.

Her next novel Found Object is set to be released on October 18, 2022.

== Bibliography ==
as Theresa Weir

| Year | Title | Series | Publisher | Notes and Awards |
|---|---|---|---|---|
| 1988 | The Forever Man | | Silhouette Publishing | out-of-print |
| 1988 | Amazon Lily | | Pocket Books | RITA finalist, Romantic Times Best New Adventure Writer award |
| 1989 | Loving Jenny | | Silhouette Publishing | |
| 1990 | Pictures of Emily | | Silhouette Publishing | |
| 1990 | Iguana Bay | | Silhouette Publishing | |
| 1991 | Forever | Molly Series | Fanfare Publishing | |
| 1992 | Last Summer | | Bantam | |
| 1994 | One Fine Day | Molly Series | Fanfare Publishing | |
| 1995 | Long Night Moon | | Fanfare Publishing | Romantic Times Reviewer's Choice Award |
| 1997 | American Dreamer | | HarperCollins Publishers | |
| 1998 | Some Kind of Magic | | HarperCollins Publishers | |
| 1998 | Cool Shade | | HarperCollins Publishers | RITA winner in the category romantic suspense |
| 1999 | Bad Karma | | HarperCollins Publishers | Daphne du Maurier award in the category paranormal |
| 2010 | Max Under the Stars | | self-published | Short story published as an e-book |
| 2011 | The Orchard - a memoir | | Grand Central Publishing | Oprah Magazine Fall Pick, received a B+ review in Entertainment Weekly, and was one of the Librarians' Best Books of 2011. |
| 2012 | The Man who Left - a memoir | | Belfry Press | New York Times bestseller, Barnes & Noble bestseller, Amazon.com bestseller |
| 2012 | The Girl with the Cat Tattoo | Cool Cats series | Belfry Press | |
| 2013 | Come As You Are | City of Lakes series | Belfry Press | |
| 2011 | The Geek with the Cat Tattoo | Cool Cats series | Belfry Press | |
| 2012 | He's Come Undone | City of Lakes series | Belfry Press | |

as Anne Frasier

| Year | Title | Series | Notes and Awards |
|---|---|---|---|
| 2002 | Hush | | USA Today bestseller, Daphne du Maurier award finalist, RITA finalist |
| 2003 | Sleep Tight | | USA Today bestseller |
| 2004 | Play Dead | Elise Sandburg Mysteries series | USA Today bestseller |
| 2005 | Before I Wake | | |
| 2006 | Pale Immortal | Land of the Dead series | |
| 2007 | Garden of Darkness | Land of the Dead series | RITA finalist |
| 2009 | Once Upon a Crime Anthology - Santa's little helper | | Short story |
| 2010 | The Lineup: Poems on Crime - Home | | |
| 2010 | Discount Noir Anthology - Crack House | | Short story |
| 2011 | Deadly Treats Halloween Anthology - The Replacement | | Short story, Frasier additionally was an editor of the anthology |
| 2012 | Once upon a Crime Anthology - Red Cadillac | | Short story |
| 2012 | Woman in a Black Veil | | |
| 2012 | Dark: Volume 1 | | Collection of short stories |
| 2012 | Dark: Volume 2 | | Collection of short stories |
| 2012 | Black Tupelo | | Collection of short stories |
| 2012 | Girls from the North Country | | Short story |
| 2012 | Made of Stars | | Short story |
| 2014 | Stay Dead | Elise Sandburg Mysteries series | |
| 2014 | From the Indie Side | | Anthology |
| 2015 | Pretty Dead | Elise Sandburg Mysteries series | |
| 2016 | The Body Reader | Detective Jude Fontaine Mysteries series | The first draft of the crime thriller was originally set in a post-apocalyptic world |
| 2017 | Truly Dead | Elise Sandburg Mysteries series | |
| 2018 | The Body Counter | Detective Jude Fontaine Mysteries series | |
| 2019 | The Body Keeper | Detective Jude Fontaine Mysteries series | |
| 2020 | Find Me | Inland Empire series | Amazon.com bestseller |
| 2021 | Tell Me | Inland Empire series | |
