= Mack C. Chase =

American petroleum businessman (1931–2023)

- Born: April 29, 1931; Texas, U.S.
- Died: October 2, 2023 (aged 92); Artesia, New Mexico, U.S.
- Occupation: Businessman
- Known for: Richest person in New Mexico
- Spouse: Marilyn Yvonne Stack (m. 1953; died 2016)
- Children: 3

Mack C. Chase (April 29, 1931 – October 2, 2023) was an American oil and natural gas businessman, who made his fortune in the oilfields of the Permian Basin in Texas and New Mexico.

== Early life ==
Mack C. Chase was born in Texas on April 29, 1931, the fourth of eight children of Edgar and Marie Chase. He started work in the oil industry at age 14, and after graduating from Artesia High School in 1950, went to work for Nash, Winfor and Brown. He served in the US Army from 1951 to 1953 as an A&E mechanic during the Korean War.

== Career ==
Chase worked on oilwells with his father and brother George, before starting his own business in 1968.

In 1979, he went into partnership with John R. Gray and started the pumping services company Marbob Energy, before expanding into drilling, but they split soon after 1991. Chase started Mack Energy, which in 2007 sold much of its property to Concho Resources.

At the time of his death in 2023, Chase was still active in oil and owned ex Chase Farms and Deerhorn Aviation. As of June 2017, Chase was the richest person in New Mexico.

== Personal life and death ==
In 1953, Chase, aged 22, married Marilyn Yvonne Stack, who was 18. They have three children, Robert, Richard and Gerene. She died in 2016, shortly after their 63rd wedding anniversary. He lived in Artesia, New Mexico.

Chase died in Artesia on October 2, 2023, at the age of 92.
