= The J. R. R. Tolkien Lecture on Fantasy Literature =

Annual lecture commemorating J R R Tolkien

The J.R.R. Tolkien Lecture on Fantasy Literature
- Status: Active
- Genre: Fantasy literature, Science fiction, Horror
- Frequency: Annually
- Venue: Pembroke College, Oxford
- Locations: Oxford, United Kingdom
- Years active: 2013–present
- Organiser: Pembroke College Middle Common Room
- Website: tolkienlecture.org

The J.R.R. Tolkien Lecture on Fantasy Literature is a free public lecture delivered annually at Pembroke College, Oxford.

The series was founded by Pembroke postgraduate students Will Badger and Gabriel Schenk in memory of J.R.R. Tolkien, who was Rawlinson and Bosworth Professor of Anglo-Saxon at Pembroke from 1925 until 1945. During this time he wrote The Hobbit and the majority of The Lord of the Rings. The aim of the lecture series is to stimulate more serious study of fantasy literature at Oxford University and beyond. The lecture can be on any subject dealing with fantasy, science fiction, horror, or related speculative genres.

The Pembroke College Middle Common Room announced the series in 2012, and the first lecture was delivered on 18 January 2013 by fantasy writer Kij Johnson.

R. F. Kuang was scheduled to deliver the eighth-annual lecture in April 2020, but because of the COVID-19 pandemic, her lecture was postponed. On 16 May 2020, in lieu of a lecture, past speakers Kij Johnson, Adam Roberts, Lev Grossman, Terri Windling, and Victoria 'V.E.' Schwab joined forthcoming lecturer Kuang for an online symposium on 'Fantasy in Times of Crisis'. The organizers invited donations to the Society of Authors' emergency fund to support British writers whose livelihoods had been affected by the pandemic.

Guy Gavriel Kay delivered the 2021 lecture on 11 May. It was held digitally via Zoom and streamed live to YouTube. In 2022, the Tolkien Lecture was held in person again, with R. F. Kuang delivering the lecture at Pembroke on 23 May.

Science fiction critic, writer, and publisher Cheryl Morgan regularly blogs about the lecture series on her website. Fantasy author Juliet E. McKenna has also written about the series.

== History ==
Date	Lecturer	Title
18 January 2013	Kij Johnson	Inaugural Pembroke Lecture on Fantasy Literature in Honour of J.R.R. Tolkien
2 May 2014	Adam Roberts	Tolkien and Women
13 May 2015	Lev Grossman	Fear and Loathing in Aslan's Land
26 May 2016	Terri Windling	Tolkien's Long Shadow: Reflections on Fantasy Literature in the Post-Tolkien Era
27 April 2017	Susan Cooper	A Catch of the Breath
1 May 2018	V. E. Schwab	In Search of Doors
26 February 2019	Marlon James	Our Myths, Our Selves
16 May 2020	Panel Discussion: Kij Johnson; Adam Roberts; Lev Grossman; Terri Windling; V. E. Schwab; R. F. Kuang	Fantasy in Times of Crisis
11 May 2021	Guy Gavriel Kay	Just Enough Light: Some Thoughts on Fantasy and Literature
23 May 2022	R. F. Kuang	Goodness, Beauty, and Truth: The Value of Art in Times of Crisis
16 May 2023	Maria Dahvana Headley	Tell Me a Story: How Fantastical Literature Has Been Shaped by Storytellers and Audiences
12 June 2024	Neil Gaiman	Hand Grenade Pins: On Libraries and the Fantastic
19 May 2025	Zen Cho	The Uses of Fantasy
19 May 2026	Brandon Sanderson	On Fantasy
