= Morningside, New Mexico =

- Census-designated place
- Location within New Mexico
- Coordinates: 32°51′40″N 104°23′49″W
- Country: United States
- State: New Mexico
- County: Eddy

Area
  - Total: 0.093 sq mi (0.24 km^{2})
  - Land: 0.093 sq mi (0.24 km^{2})
  - Water: 0 sq mi (0.00 km^{2})
- Elevation: 3,373 ft (1,028 m)

Population (2020)
  - Total: 302
  - Density: 3,218.1/sq mi (1,242.53/km^{2})
- Time zone: UTC-7 (Mountain (MST))
  - Summer (DST): UTC-6 (MDT)
- Area code: 575
- GNIS feature ID: 2584157

Morningside is an unincorporated community and census-designated place in Eddy County, New Mexico, United States. As of the 2020 census, Morningside had a population of 302. The community is located on the northern border of Artesia west of U.S. Route 285.

== Geography ==
Morningside is located along US Route 285 just north of Artesia. According to the U.S. Census Bureau, the community has an area of 0.090 square miles (0.23 km^{2}), all land.

== Demographics ==
Historical population
Census	Pop.	Note	%±
2020	302		—
U.S. Decennial Census

== Education ==
It is within the Artesia Public Schools school district. Artesia High School is the school district's sole comprehensive high school.
