= Hope, New Mexico =

- Village
- Location of Hope, New Mexico

- Location in the United States
- Coordinates: 32°48′57″N 104°44′09″W
- Country: United States
- State: New Mexico
- County: Eddy

Area
  - Total: 1.22 sq mi (3.17 km^{2})
  - Land: 1.22 sq mi (3.17 km^{2})
  - Water: 0 sq mi (0.00 km^{2})
- Elevation: 4,095 ft (1,248 m)

Population (2020)
  - Total: 113
  - Density: 92.4/sq mi (35.66/km^{2})
- Time zone: UTC-07:00 (MST)
  - Summer (DST): UTC-06:00 (MDT)
- ZIP code: 88250
- Area code: 575
- FIPS code: 35-33290
- GNIS feature ID: 2413559

Hope is a village in Eddy County, New Mexico, United States. It is located approximately 20 miles (32 km) west of Artesia on U.S. Route 82. It has had a post office since 1890. As of the 2020 census, the population was 113.

== Geography ==
Hope is located in northwestern Eddy County at 32°48′43″N 104°44′01″W. US 82 passes through the center of the village, leading east 20 miles (32 km) to Artesia and west 90 miles (140 km) over the Sacramento Mountains to Alamogordo.

According to the United States Census Bureau, the village has a total area of 1.22 square miles (3.17 km^{2}), all land.

=== Climate ===
Climate data for Hope, New Mexico (1991–2020 normals, extremes 1919–1946, 1966–1995, 2000–present)
Month	Jan	Feb	Mar	Apr	May	Jun	Jul	Aug	Sep	Oct	Nov	Dec	Year
Record high °F (°C)	81 (27)	87 (31)	97 (36)	100 (38)	109 (43)	115 (46)	111 (44)	106 (41)	104 (40)	97 (36)	88 (31)	81 (27)	115 (46)
Mean daily maximum °F (°C)	56.5 (13.6)	60.5 (15.8)	68.2 (20.1)	76.6 (24.8)	85.1 (29.5)	93.9 (34.4)	93.1 (33.9)	91.6 (33.1)	85.5 (29.7)	76.7 (24.8)	65.1 (18.4)	56.7 (13.7)	75.8 (24.3)
Daily mean °F (°C)	43.2 (6.2)	46.5 (8.1)	53.6 (12.0)	61.4 (16.3)	70.1 (21.2)	78.4 (25.8)	80.2 (26.8)	79.3 (26.3)	72.5 (22.5)	62.8 (17.1)	51.5 (10.8)	43.7 (6.5)	61.9 (16.6)
Mean daily minimum °F (°C)	29.9 (−1.2)	32.5 (0.3)	38.9 (3.8)	46.1 (7.8)	55.1 (12.8)	63.0 (17.2)	67.4 (19.7)	67.0 (19.4)	59.5 (15.3)	49.0 (9.4)	38.0 (3.3)	30.7 (−0.7)	48.1 (8.9)
Record low °F (°C)	−5 (−21)	−5 (−21)	2 (−17)	15 (−9)	28 (−2)	41 (5)	48 (9)	48 (9)	35 (2)	13 (−11)	−4 (−20)	−10 (−23)	−10 (−23)
Average precipitation inches (mm)	0.41 (10)	0.36 (9.1)	0.55 (14)	0.58 (15)	1.03 (26)	0.89 (23)	1.97 (50)	1.88 (48)	2.82 (72)	1.13 (29)	0.67 (17)	0.57 (14)	12.86 (327)
Average snowfall inches (cm)	0.5 (1.3)	0.7 (1.8)	0.1 (0.25)	0.0 (0.0)	0.0 (0.0)	0.0 (0.0)	0.0 (0.0)	0.0 (0.0)	0.0 (0.0)	0.1 (0.25)	0.3 (0.76)	1.7 (4.3)	3.4 (8.6)
Average precipitation days (≥ 0.01 in)	2.5	2.6	2.3	2.1	3.7	3.6	5.9	7.1	6.3	4.3	2.6	3.0	46.0
Average snowy days (≥ 0.1 in)	0.4	0.3	0.1	0.0	0.0	0.0	0.0	0.0	0.0	0.0	0.3	0.6	1.7
Source: NOAA

== History ==
Founded in 1884 as "Badgerville", the name was changed in 1890 for post office purposes.

The town was featured in Life magazine on May 29, 1950, with an account of the newly elected Petticoat City Government under Mayor Ethel Altman.

== Demographics ==
Historical population
Census	Pop.	Note	%±
1910	417		—
1920	430		3.1%
1930	275		−36.0%
1940	289		5.1%
1950	186		−35.6%
1960	108		−41.9%
1970	90		−16.7%
1980	111		23.3%
1990	101		−9.0%
2000	107		5.9%
2010	105		−1.9%
2020	113		7.6%
U.S. Decennial Census

As of the census of 2000, there were 107 people, 45 households, and 27 families residing in the village. The population density was 92.3 inhabitants per square mile (35.6/km^{2}). There were 58 housing units at an average density of 50.0 per square mile (19.3/km^{2}). The racial makeup of the village was 77.57% White, 0.93% African American, 4.67% from other races, and 16.82% from two or more races. Hispanic or Latino of any race were 16.82% of the population.

There were 45 households, out of which 26.7% had children under the age of 18 living with them, 48.9% were married couples living together, 11.1% had a female householder with no husband present, and 40.0% were non-families. 31.1% of all households were made up of individuals, and 26.7% had someone living alone who was 65 years of age or older. The average household size was 2.38 and the average family size was 3.00.

In the village, the population was spread out, with 25.2% under the age of 18, 6.5% from 18 to 24, 22.4% from 25 to 44, 18.7% from 45 to 64, and 27.1% who were 65 years of age or older. The median age was 42 years. For every 100 females, there were 109.8 males. For every 100 females age 18 and over, there were 105.1 males.

The median income for a household in the village was $17,639, and the median income for a family was $28,750. Males had a median income of $19,583 versus $43,750 for females. The per capita income for the village was $12,867. There were 10.7% of families and 20.2% of the population living below the poverty line, including no under eighteens and 7.9% of those over 64.

== Education ==
It is within the Artesia Public Schools school district. The K-8 school Peñasco Elementary School is west of Hope, and serves the Hope community. Artesia Park Junior High School is the district's sole school for grade 9, and Artesia High School is the school district's sole comprehensive high school, for grades 10-12.
