= Roy C. Booth =

American author (born 1965)

- Born: August 26, 1965 (age 61); Bemidji, Minnesota, U.S.
- Education: Pillager High School; Central Lakes College (MN); Bemidji State University (BA, MA)
- Spouse: Cynthia Booth
- Writing career
- Genres: Speculative Fiction, Science fiction, fantasy, horror

Roy C. Booth (born August 26, 1965) is an American speculative fiction, fantasy and horror author. He has written many novels and short stories, many of them co-written with others including Theater of the Macabre, The Flesh of Fallen Angels: A Horror Western Novella (part of the Gibson Blount series co-written with R. Thomas Riley) and Sherlock Holmes And the Case of the Man-Made Vacuum (co-written with Nicholas Johnson). Booth has a credit on IMDb for The Day Lufberry Won It All. and a credit with Doollee, the Playwrights database.

Booth is also a poet, journalist, essayist, and screenwriter. He is married to published playwright Cynthia Booth, and is owner/manager of Roy's Comics & Games of Bemidji, Minnesota.

The author appeared Diversicon 21.

== Biography ==
Born on August 26, 1965, in Bemidji, Minnesota, Booth became involved in regional theater with his wife, Cynthia Booth. From the age of six, Booth became aware that he wanted to be a writer. He had difficulty reading until he realised that he read in blocks, not line-by-line as most people do, after picking up a comic. A 1983 graduate of Pillager High School and a 2011 Hall of Fame inductee, Booth has college degrees from Central Lakes College (MN in Associate Arts) and Bemidji State University (BA in English/Speech-Theater and an MA in English with a Creative Writing Emphasis). On June 21, 2014, Central Lakes College honored 75 outstanding alumni at its special recognition event for its 75th anniversary including Booth. Central Lakes College stated, "This honorary award was established to recognize alumni who are noteworthy for their significant professional achievements and/or exemplary leadership in community activities." He has an extensive theater background having worked on over 200 professional and amateur productions as an actor, director, stage manager, scenic designer, make-up/FX designer, and fight choreographer.

In March 2012, Booth was interviewed by Lakeland Public Television on his views on comics and his novels. Booth considers writing to be a craft, albeit sometimes an invisible one. He has often revised theater and motion picture scripts written by others.

== Bibliography ==
- Altered States: a cyberpunk sci-fi anthology ISBN 978-0957113053
- A Forest of Dreams (Indie Authors Press) ISBN 978-0957113077
- Terminal: The Play with Brian Keene, Bloodletting Press
