= Loco Hills, New Mexico =

- Census-designated place
- Location within New Mexico
- Coordinates: 32°49′11″N 103°58′42″W
- Country: United States
- State: New Mexico
- County: Eddy

Area
  - Total: 0.86 sq mi (2.22 km^{2})
  - Land: 0.86 sq mi (2.22 km^{2})
  - Water: 0 sq mi (0.00 km^{2})
- Elevation: 3,652 ft (1,113 m)

Population (2020)
  - Total: 68
  - Density: 79.3/sq mi (30.62/km^{2})
- Time zone: UTC-7 (Mountain (MST))
  - Summer (DST): UTC-6 (MDT)
- ZIP code: 88255
- Area code: 575
- GNIS feature ID: 2584143

Loco Hills is a census-designated place and unincorporated community in Eddy County, New Mexico, United States. As of the 2020 census, Loco Hills had a population of 68. Loco Hills has a post office with ZIP code 88255. U.S. Route 82 passes through the community.

It is within the Artesia Public Schools school district. Artesia High School is the school district's sole comprehensive high school.

== Demographics ==
Historical population
Census	Pop.	Note	%±
2020	68		—
U.S. Decennial Census
