= The Fox Woman =

1999 novel by Kij Johnson

- First edition cover
- Author: Kij Johnson
- Publisher: Tor Books
- Publication date: January 1, 2000
- ISBN: 0-312-85429-3

The Fox Woman is a fantasy novel by American writer Kij Johnson, published in 1999 by Tor Books. The lead characters are an ambitious human named Kaya no Yoshifuji and a fox woman named Kitsune. The story follows Johnson's Theodore Sturgeon Award-winning story "Fox Magic", and precedes her novel Fudoki in the "Love/War/Death" trilogy.

Charles de Lint praised The Fox Woman as "a wonderfully evocative and gripping novel".
