= Tales of the Unanticipated =

Science fiction magazine

First issue cover

Tales of the Unanticipated, known as TOTU, is a semiprozine that was founded under the auspices of the Minnesota Science Fiction Society (known as Mn-STF or Minn-STF), and has since become independent. Like contemporaries such as Crank! and Century, Tales of the Unanticipated strove from its inception to showcase fiction, poetry and articles that are ostensibly speculative fiction.

== History ==
The first issue of Tales of the Unanticipated was launched in August 1986.b Writers who had their first published short stories premiere in TOTU include Peg Kerr, Jason Sanford, Kij Johnson, Carolyn Ives Gilman, and others who had important early appearances of their work in the magazine include Lyda Morehouse.

TOTU has published interviews with speculative fiction authors.

== See also ==
- Science fiction magazine
- Fantasy fiction magazine
- Horror fiction magazine
