= Glorifying Terrorism =

2007 anthology

- Editor: Farah Mendlesohn
- Cover artist: Haylee Fields and Mike Harwood
- Language: English
- Genre: science fiction anthology
- Publisher: Rackstraw Press
- Publication date: 2007
- Publication place: United Kingdom
- Media type: Print and ebook
- Pages: 261
- ISBN: 0-9554688-0-9

Glorifying Terrorism is a 2007 science fiction anthology edited by Farah Mendlesohn, which was compiled in direct response to the Terrorism Act 2006. Every story in the anthology has been specifically designed to be illegal under the Act's prohibition on any publication "indirectly encouraging the commission or preparation of acts of terrorism," including "every statement which glorifies the commission or preparation (whether in the past, in the future or generally) of such acts," and the anthology's introduction begins with the explicit statement that "(t)he purpose of the stories and poems in this book is to glorify terrorism."

== Critical response ==
The Morning Star offers the anthology a "rousing cheer", declaring its contributors to be "top-notch" and stating that it has "too many highlights to list"; it also states that the authors will not be prosecuted, because they are "too respectable and, mostly, too white".

== Contributors ==
- Kathryn Allen
- Chaz Brenchley
- Marie Brennan
- Hal Duncan
- Suzette Haden Elgin
- Kira Franz
- Van Aaron Hughes
- Davin Ireland
- Gwyneth Jones
- Vylar Kaftan
- Lucy Kemnitzer
- H. H. Løyche
- Ken MacLeod
- Una McCormack
- Adam Roberts
- Elizabeth Sourbut
- Katherine Sparrow
- Kari Sperring
- Charlie Stross
- Rachel Swirsky
- Lavie Tidhar
- James Trimarco
- Jo Walton
- Ian Watson
- Ian Whates
