= Halfway Human =

1998 novel by Carolyn Ives Gilman

- Author: Carolyn Ives Gilman
- Cover artist: J.K. Potter
- Language: English
- Genre: Science fiction novel
- Publisher: Avon Books
- Publication date: 1998
- Publication place: United States
- Media type: Print (paperback)
- ISBN: 0-380-79799-2
- OCLC: 38198333

Halfway Human (1998) is a science fiction novel written by Carolyn Ives Gilman. It was nominated for the 1998 Tiptree Award and placed second on the Locus Readers Poll for Best First Novel in 1999.

== Plot ==
The novel follows the life of Tedla, an asexual being from an evolutionary offshoot of humanity. It is neither male nor female and refers to itself as a “bland.” On their home planet blands are kept at a near-slave class, considered to be not human and much less important than either male or female. Blands are mentally, physically and sexually abused by their human masters, normally called guardians.

Tedla is found by a social worker named Val Endrada on the planet Capella, light-years away from its home planet of Gammadis, just after trying to kill itself. The existence of the bland off-planet sets into motion a political confrontation between the powers on both planets.

== Reception ==
The work was generally praised by critics at the time of publication and has since been called "groundbreaking." Fellow writer Lisa DuMond reviewed the book in 1998 and suggested that it would likely be included on the Hugo and Nebula ballots for that year.

== Themes ==
=== Gender and sexuality ===
Patricia Wheeler compares Gilman's treatment of gender and sexuality, and particularly her attempt to create a character that exhibits neither male nor female characteristics, to Left Hand of Darkness by Ursula Le Guin. Wheeler mentions that many criticized Le Guin for ultimately failing to create characters that did not exhibit gendered traits, and suggests that this failure could possibly be evident in Halfway Human as well, depending on how the reader chooses to imagine Tedla. Wheeler wonders "Is it possible to see it [Tedla] as completely without gender attributes?" Wheeler remarks on Gilman's use of the juxtaposition of Capellan and Gammadian societies in her story as a way to examine how gender is treated in our society.
