= The Dream-Quest of Vellitt Boe =

2016 fantasy novella by Kij Johnson

- Cover of first edition
- Author: Kij Johnson
- Cover artist: Victo Ngai
- Language: English
- Genre: Fantasy
- Publisher: Tor.com
- Publication date: 2016
- Publication place: United States
- Media type: Paperback, ebook
- Pages: 165 pages
- ISBN: 978-0-7653-9141-4

The Dream-Quest of Vellitt Boe is a 2016 fantasy novella by American writer Kij Johnson, revisiting H. P. Lovecraft's The Dream-Quest of Unknown Kadath from the viewpoint of a woman. It was first published in trade paperback and ebook format by Tor.com.

== Synopsis ==
When a student at Ulthar Women's College runs off with a man from the Waking World, professor Vellitt Boe — a retired adventurer — must track her down and convince her to return.

== Reception ==
The Dream-Quest of Vellitt Boe won the 2017 World Fantasy Award—Long Fiction, and was a finalist for the Nebula Award for Best Novella of 2016, the 2017 Hugo Award for Best Novella, and the 2017 Locus Award for Best Novella.

Publishers Weekly called it "absorbing" and "utterly irresistible", lauding Johnson for "(s)uperb worldbuilding and gorgeous prose".

At National Public Radio, Amal El-Mohtar noted that the story is "perfectly self-contained", and can be appreciated without any knowledge of the source material on which it is based.
