= The Privilege of the Happy Ending =

The Privilege of the Happy Ending is a 2018 metafictional dark fantasy story by Kij Johnson. It was first published in Clarkesworld Magazine.

== Synopsis ==
In medieval England, 6-year-old Ada and her talking chicken Blanche defeat a plague of reptilian wastoures, as the author provides commentary on the backstory and future of minor characters.

== Reception ==
The Privilege of the Happy Ending won the 2019 World Fantasy Award—Novella.

Tangent Online praised it as "darkly delightful" and "beautifully written", with Johnson's frequent authorial interjections initially being "jarring", but eventually "eagerly anticipated".
