= Jennifer Stevenson =

- Born: Jennifer Stevenson; October 6, 1955 Waukegan, Illinois, U.S.
- Occupation: Fantasy writer; Romance novelist; Short story writer
- Education: University of Iowa; Southern Connecticut State University
- Alma mater: University of Iowa (BA); Southern Connecticut State University (MA, MA)
- Genre: Urban fantasy; Romantic fantasy; Paranormal romance; Magical realism
- Literary movement: Feminist speculative fiction
- Years active: 2004–present
- Notable works: Trash Sex Magic (2004); Hinky Chicago series Slacker Demons series

Jennifer Stevenson (born October 6, 1955, in Waukegan, Illinois) is a Chicago-based American fantasy and romance author who mixes romantic comedy with magical realist, regional (usually Chicago-set), working-class, and sex-positive storytelling. She is an active member of the American feminist speculative fiction community.

== Works ==
Stevenson has published both short stories and several novel series, most of them blending urban fantasy with other popular storytelling genres.

Her debut novel, Trash Sex Magic (published in 2004 by Small Beer Press), earned a place on science-fiction industry journal Locus magazine's short list for its First Fantasy Short Novel Award in 2005, and on the Science Fiction Writers of America's long list for its Nebula Award in both 2005 and 2006. Trash Sex Magic was praised by American critic Jessica Crispin, founder of the literary-publishing newsblog Bookslut, for its non-patronizing portrayal of poor characters and of the lives of lower-class Chicagoans. "What was the last book with main characters living in trailers below the poverty line who were not belittled or pitied by the author? Stevenson does not judge her characters, and that counts for a lot," Crispin wrote, noting Stevenson's refusal to use classist caricature in her depiction of the American underclass.

Stevenson has created three series of fantasy novels, loosely set within the same universe: "Hinky Chicago" (romantic fantasy, featuring female heroes Jewel Heiss, a fraud cop/investigator, and Hel, an energy vampire); "Slacker Demons" (paranormal romance, about retired gods now slumming it as incubi); and the upcoming "Coed Demon Sluts" (fantasy paired with "women's fiction", in ways that recover the conventionally sexist, dark fantasy/horror trope of the succubus to explore female lives). Stevenson also writes "Backstage Boys," a non-magical novel series about the comic adventures of sexy stagehands, turning men who typically perform working-class labor and own union cards, into romantic leading characters.

== Other contributions ==
Stevenson donated her personal papers to the SWFA's Science Fiction and Fantasy archives within the Rare Books and Special Collections section of the University Libraries of Northern Illinois University. With speculative-fiction storytelling becoming legitimized by academic institutions and scholars, creating university-based centers for science-fiction studies, Northern Illinois University's collection signifies a growing number of American research-university libraries that archive print-literary (and new-media) works by science fiction, fantasy, horror, and other fantastic-genre writers, filmmakers, and artists. Stevenson's papers, dated from 2004 to 2010, reflect her story development process, including novel drafts, research and revision notes, and publishing-industry correspondence and critiques.

Stevenson mentors published and new authors as part of her feminist writing pedagogy. A teacher of the art of writing erotic fiction, she created and frequently hosts a popular, sex-positive, reading series of science fiction/fantasy/fairytale erotica, "Smut and Nothing But", performed by various writers of fantastic literature, at speculative fiction conventions such as WisCon and ReaderCon, as well as at the International Conference of the Fantastic in the Arts (ICFA). At ICFA and other fantastic storytelling community venues, she frequently organizes panels on how the current state of the publishing industry might inform practical strategies for working writers. Additionally, she co-founded and belongs to the publishing cooperative of Book View Cafe alongside other science fiction/fantasy authors with traditional publishing experience, such as Gregory Frost, Vonda McIntyre, Mary Anne Mohanraj, and Sarah Zettel. She is a regular contributor to the coop's "BVC Eats" blog of recipes and food-related advice.

Stevenson also teaches writing workshops, including her "Finding Your Voice: Fan Mail From the Future" set of creative prompts, which she's also offered at different author venues.

== Personal ==
Stevenson cites P.G. Wodehouse, Georgette Heyer, and Terry Pratchett as her influences. She has a bachelor's degree from the University of Iowa in English and Music, as well as double master's degrees in both General Counseling and Structural Family Theory from Southern Connecticut State University. Her non-writing skill sets include cooking, gardening, biking, speed skates, feminist ecological and spiritual practice, and the occasional feeding of crows.
