= Katherine Sparrow =

American author (born 1976)

- Born: April 15, 1976 (age 50); Seattle, Washington, USA
- Occupation: Author
- Writing career
- Genre: speculative fiction
- Website: katherinesparrow.net

Katherine H. Sparrow is an author of middle-grade, young adult and adult speculative fiction active since 2006. She writes as Katherine Sparrow, and, on one occasion, Katharine Sparrow.

== Biography ==
Sparrow is a native of Seattle, Washington, where she currently resides. She has two children and enjoys gardening.

== Literary career ==
Sparrow attended the Clarion West Writers Workshop and organizes workshops for writers in Seattle. She is represented by Linda Epstein with the Emerald City Literary Agency. Sparrow has been nominated for a Nebula Award. Her work has appeared in various periodicals, webzines, podcasts and anthologies, including Aeon, Andromeda Spaceways Inflight Magazine, Apex Science Fiction and Horror Digest, At Year's End: Holiday SFF Stories, Beyond Binary, Bull Spec, Cast of Wonders, Coffee: 14 Caffeinated Tales of the Fantastic, Descended From Darkness, Destination: Future, Escape Pod, Fantasy Magazine, Fast Ships, Black Sails, Giganotosaurus, Glorifying Terrorism, Interzone, Nebula Awards Showcase 2013, PodCastle, Shimmer, Shiny, Son and Foe, Strange Bedfellows: An Anthology of Political Science Fiction, and Toasted Cake. One collaborative short story written with Rachel Swirsky has also appeared in the Rachel Swirsky collection Through the Drowsy Dark (2010).

== Bibliography ==
=== Novels ===
==== The Fay Morgan Chronicles ====
- The Witch's Secret (2017)
- The Demon's Hunger (2017)
- The Angel's Folly (2017)
- The Wolf and the King (2017)

==== Standalone novels ====
- Little Apocalypse (2019)

=== Short fiction ===
- "Believe" (2006)
- "The Petrified Girl" (2006)
- "The Future Is Already Seen" (2007)
- "Be the Bomb You Throw" (2007)
- "The End of Crazy" (2007)
- "Welcome to Oceanopia!" (2007) (as Katharine Sparrow)
- "Pirate Solutions" (2008)
- "These Days" (2008)
- "Hello, I Love You" (2008)
- "Red and Road" (2009)
- "Chemical Magic" (2009)
- "Rotations and Consequences" (2009)
- "No Longer You" (2009) (with Rachel Swirsky)
- "The Jacob Miracle" (2010)
- "Alienation" (2010)
- "Like Parchment in the Fire" (2010)
- "Before the Uprising" (2011)
- "The Migratory Pattern of Dancers" (2011)
- "New Year's Revolution" (2012)
- "The Mostly True Adventures of Assman & Foxy" (2013)
- "Sexiest Fun Time Drug" (2013)
- "Why Lily Left" (2014)

== Awards ==
"The Migratory Pattern of Dancers" was nominated for the 2012 Nebula Award for Best Novelette.
