= Ponies (short story) =

2010 short story by Kij Johnson

"Ponies" is a 2010 fantasy story by American writer Kij Johnson. It was first published on Tor.com.

== Plot summary ==
Barbara, like all little girls, has a magic talking pony with wings and a horn. She and her pony, Sunny, are invited to a "cutting-out party" by a group of girls called TheOtherGirls and their leader, TopGirl, where she must remove two of Sunny's special features. Sunny is enthusiastic about the party at first, although admits that she will miss flying and having a horn, as she is keeping her voice. Barbara cuts away the horn and wings of Sunny, but TopGirl tells her that in order for Sunny to be accepted by the rest of the ponies, she must also take out her voice. Barbara is initially reluctant, but when Sunny realizes that Barbara intends to remove her voice, she attempts to flee and is pursued by the other ponies. Sunny can't defend herself without her horn, or fly away without her wings, so the ponies kill Sunny. TheOtherGirls leave to continue playing party games, and TopGirl tells Barbara that she is unwelcome because she doesn't have a pony.

== Reception ==
"Ponies" won the 2010 Nebula Award for Best Short Story, (tied with "How Interesting: A Tiny Man" by Harlan Ellison), and was nominated for the Hugo Award for Best Short Story and the World Fantasy Award for Best Short Story.

Strange Horizons called the story a "grotesque". Lois Tilton considered the story to be "Highly Unsubtle." Chad Orzel described the story as "just dreadful", based on a central idea that was "preposterously contrived" and "a gigantic and unsubtle literalized metaphor", and with "essentially no plot."
