= Benjamin Parzybok =

American novelist

Benjamin I Parzybok (born 1970) is an American novelist. His debut novel, Couch, written in a six-month period while the author was living in Ecuador, was published in 2008 by Small Beer Press.

Benjamin Parzybok is the creator of Gumball Poetry, a (now defunct) journal published through gumball machines, the Psychic Book Project and the Black Magic Insurance Agency, a citywide mystery/treasure hunt. His projects have twice been selected as Best of Portland for the Willamette Week: "Best Guy Who Walks His Talk" and "Best Quarter's Worth of Culture."

Besides freelancing, his most recent start up is Walker Tracker, a walking community for pedometer enthusiasts.

He received a BA in creative writing from the Evergreen State College, Olympia, WA. He has lived in Brooklyn, Central America, Taiwan, R.O.C., Ecuador, up and down the Pacific Northwest, and now lives in Portland, Oregon, with the writer Laura Moulton and their two children. He is also the cousin of Lucas Parzybok, who has also successfully published a book.

Parzybok has cited influences including Haruki Murakami, Ursula Le Guin, and David Eddings.
