= Artesia Public Schools =

School district in New Mexico, United States

Address
- 1106 West Quay Ave Artesia, New Mexico, 88210; United States

District information
- Grades: PK–12
- Schools: 10
- NCES District ID: 3500120

Students and staff
- Students: 3,701 (2019–20)
- Teachers: 243.91 (FTE)
- Student–teacher ratio: 15.71

Artesia Public Schools (APS) is a school district headquartered in Artesia, New Mexico.

In Eddy County the district includes: Artesia, Atoka, Hope, Loco Hills, and Morningside. The district also has a portion in Chaves County.

== History ==
Crit Caton announced she would retire as superintendent in 2019. John Ross Null became the superintendent at that time.

In October 2020, during the COVID-19 pandemic in New Mexico, the school still had all virtual classes and a suspension of all athletic activities. A group of students advocated for in person classes and activities.

The former Abo Elementary School, now on the National Register of Historic Places, is located in the district.

== Schools ==
=== Secondary ===
- Artesia High School
- Artesia Junior High School

=== Primary ===
- Artesia Intermediate School
- Elementary schools:
  - Central Elementary School
  - Hermosa Elementary School
  - Peñasco Elementary School (Unincorporated area, Hope postal address)
  - Roselawn Elementary School
  - Yeso Elementary School
  - Yucca Elementary School

=== Preschool ===
- Grand Heights Early Childhood Center
