= Artesia High School (New Mexico) =

Coordinates: 32.8406°N 104.4092°W

Location
- 1006 West Richardson Ave. Artesia, New Mexico 88210; United States

Information
- Type: Public high school
- School district: Artesia Public Schools
- Principal: Halee Goff
- Teaching staff: 50.35 (FTE)
- Grades: 10-12
- Enrollment: 778 (2023–2024)
- Student to teacher ratio: 15.45
- Campus: Suburban
- Colors: Orange and White
- Athletics conference: NMAA, AAAAA Dist. 4
- Mascot: Bulldog
- Rival: Carlsbad High School
- Website: www.bulldogs.org/o/ahs/

Artesia High School (AHS) is the public senior high school of Artesia, New Mexico, United States. It is a part of the Artesia Public Schools. The colors of AHS are orange, black and white, and the school's mascot is a Bulldog. Enrollment currently stands at 751.

The school district, of which Artesia High is the sole comprehensive high school, includes: Artesia, Atoka, Hope, Loco Hills, and Morningside.

== Academics ==
=== Student body statistics ===
Ethnicity	Artesia High School	State average
Hispanic (of any race)	53%	56%
White (non-Hispanic)	47%	29%
American Indian/Alaskan Native	<1%	11%
African American	<1%	3%
Pacific Islander	<1%	1%

== Athletics ==
AHS competes in the New Mexico Activities Association, and is a AAAAA school in District 4.

State championships
Season	Sport	Number of championships	Year
Fall	Volleyball	4	2011, 2010, 1978, 1977
Fall	Football	33	2025 2023, 2022, 2017, 2015, 2014, 2010, 2007, 2006, 2004, 2003, 2001, 1998, 1997, 1996, 1994, 1993, 1992, 1987, 1984, 1983, 1982, 1980, 1978, 1976, 1975, 1974, 1969, 1968, 1967, 1966, 1964, 1957
Winter	Basketball, boys'	2	1995, 1997
Winter	Basketball, girls'	1	1977
Spring	Baseball, boys'	7	2025,2000, 1996, 1994, 1993, 1987, 1976
Spring	Golf, boys'	3	2007, 2002, 1998
Spring	Softball	6	2019, 2018, 2001, 1999, 1995, 1988
Spring	Track and field, boys'	5	2011, 1999, 1998, 1997, 1976
Spring	Cheerleading	4	2009, 2008, 2007, 2006
Total		59	

== Notable alumni ==
- Mack C. Chase (born 1931), oil and natural gas tycoon
- Anne Frasier, author
- Charles W. Henderson, author
- Landry Jones, NFL quarterback formerly for the Pittsburgh Steelers, currently with the Dallas Renegades
- Edgar Mitchell, astronaut, during the 1971 Apollo 14 mission became the sixth man to walk on the Moon
- Ron Nelson, professional basketball player
- Michael Rogers, Oklahoma Secretary of State
