= The Man Who Bridged the Mist =

2011 science fiction/fantasy novella by Kij Johnson

The Man Who Bridged the Mist is a science fiction/fantasy novella by Kij Johnson. It was first published in Isaac Asimov's Science Fiction Magazine in October/November 2011, and subsequently republished in The Year's Best Science Fiction: Twenty-Ninth Annual Collection, in The Best Science Fiction and Fantasy of the Year: Volume 6, in The Year's Best Science Fiction & Fantasy 2012, in Nebula Awards Showcase 2013, in Johnson's collection At the Mouth of the River of Bees, and as a chapbook from Phoenix Pick. In 2013, a Persian version was published by Parian Publications.

== Synopsis ==
A vast Empire is split by an enormous river filled with a semisolid corrosive mist that is home to monsters... until Kit Meinem arrives to build a suspension bridge.

== Reception ==
"Bridged" won the 2012 Hugo Award for Best Novella and the 2011 Nebula Award for Best Novella. As well, it was a finalist for the 2011 Theodore Sturgeon Award; however, Johnson withdrew it from consideration, as she was a Sturgeon juror.

Ken Liu describes the story as "hover(ing) half way between science fiction and fantasy," stating that he likes "the way the precise nature of the mist is never made clear".
