= 26 Monkeys, Also the Abyss =

- Short story by Kij Johnson
- Language: English
- Genre: Fantasy

Publication
- Published in: Asimov's Science Fiction
- Publication type: Magazine
- Publication date: July 2008

"26 Monkeys, Also the Abyss" is a fantasy short story by American writer Kij Johnson, published in 2008 in the American magazine Asimov's Science Fiction. It was nominated for the 2009 Nebula Award for Best Short Story and the 2009 Hugo Award for Best Short Story. It won the 2009 World Fantasy Award for Best Short Fiction and the Asimov's Readers' Award for Best Short Story.

== Plot summary ==
Aimee has bought a travelling monkey show, wherein 26 monkeys do a variety of tricks and then vanish. She tries to figure out how the vanishing happens.

Preceded by Theodora Goss	World Fantasy Award—Short Fiction winner 2009	Succeeded by Karen Joy Fowler
