= Spar (short story) =

Short story by Kij Johnson

"Spar" is a science fiction short story by American writer Kij Johnson, first published in Clarkesworld Magazine. It won the 2009 Nebula Award for Best Short Story, and was a finalist for the 2010 Hugo Award for Best Short Story.

== Plot summary ==
A survivor of a space shipwreck is trapped in a raft with an alien, and is pitted against it in a sexual competition for survival and dominance.

The story is written in a third-person perspective with a nameless female survivor of a spaceship wreck. A tentacled alien has made it into the escape pod with her and tries to assert its dominance. The female spacer tries to make sense of what the alien is using her for, and what she is to it. She also tries to make a connection to the alien by teaching it about her body parts and how to pleasure her, rather than to assault her. All the while, the spacer has flashbacks to a man, Gary, lost in the accident, who tried to make an emotional connection to her when all she wanted was a physical connection. In the end, the female spacer is rescued and now has to face being around human beings again.

== The Bacon Remix ==
Johnson contributed an alternate version to Baconthology edited by John J. Ordover featuring "baconized" stories for Bacon-Palooza II, a 2013 charity event benefiting autistic children.

Clarkesworld Magazine published "Spar (The Bacon Remix)" as text and audio in Issue 79, April 2013.
