= The Evolution of Trickster Stories Among the Dogs of North Park After the Change =

2007 short story by Kij Johnson

"The Evolution of Trickster Stories Among the Dogs of North Park After the Change" is a 2007 science fiction/fantasy short story by American writer Kij Johnson.

It was originally published in The Coyote Road: Trickster Tales, from Viking Press, and subsequently republished in The Year's Best Fantasy and Horror: 21st Annual Collection.

== Synopsis ==
The story depicts a world in the aftermath of "the Change", a mysterious event whereby all domesticated mammals spontaneously gain near-human intelligence and the ability to speak. Terrified pet owners evict their dogs, and the bewildered animals cluster together in packs.

Linna, a student, interacts with the abandoned dogs as they become feral, and notices that they tell each other stories about "One Dog", a trickster figure.

== Reception ==
It was shortlisted for the 2007 Nebula Award for Best Novelette. and the 2008 World Fantasy Award—Short Fiction.

Steven H Silver, writing at Black Gate, called it "excellent", describing it as a "fable" — a term he also applies to the stories the dogs tell each other.
