= Lyda Morehouse =

American novelist

Lyda Ann Morehouse
- Born: November 18, 1967 (age 58); Sacramento, California, U.S.
- Occupation: Writer
- Writing career
- Pen name: Tate Hallaway
- Genres: fantasy, science fiction
- Website: lydamorehouse.com

Lyda Morehouse (born November 18, 1967) is an American science fiction and fantasy author.

Her first four books, the AngeLINK series (Archangel Protocol, Fallen Host, Messiah Node, and Apocalypse Array), blend cyberpunk technology with unconventional religious themes. She is the winner of multiple national awards, including the Philip K. Dick Award's Special Citation of Excellence (2005), Shamus Award for Original Paperback featuring a Private Investigator (2001), and the Barnes & Noble Maiden Voyage Award for debut science fiction novel (2001).

Under the name Tate Hallaway, Morehouse also wrote the Garnet Lacey series (Tall, Dark and Dead, Dead Sexy, Romancing the Dead, Dead If I Do, and Honeymoon of the Dead), the Vampire Princess of St. Paul young adult series (Almost to Die For, Almost Final Curtain, and Almost Everything); the paranormal mystery Precinct 13 and its web serial sequel Unjust Cause; and (with Rachel Calish) the young adult novel Song of Secrets (The School for Wayward Demons, Bk. 1). She also wrote the short story "Fire and Ice and Linguini for Two", appearing in the anthology Many Bloody Returns.

In 2009, she donated her archive to the department of Rare Books and Special Collections at Northern Illinois University.

== Biblio ==
=== Earth's Shadow Trilogy ===
- Welcome to Boy.Net (2024)

=== AngeLink Universe ===
- Archangel Protocol (2001)
- Fallen Host (2002)
- Messiah Node (2003)
- Apocalypse Array (2004)
- Resurrection Code (2011)

=== Garnet Lacey, as by Tate Hallaway ===
- Tall, Dark & Dead (2006)
- Dead Sexy (2007)
- Romancing the Dead (2008)
- Dead If I Do (2009)
- Honeymoon of the Dead (2010)

=== Vampire Princess of St. Paul, as by Tate Hallaway ===
- Almost to Die For (2010)
- Almost Final Curtain (2011)
- Almost Everything (2012)

=== Alex Conner, as by Tate Hallaway ===
1. Precinct 13 (2012)
2. Unjust Cause (2020)

=== The School for Wayward Demons, as by Tate Hallaway ===
- Song of Secrets (2015) with Rachel Calish

=== Short Fiction ===
- Irish Blood (1997)
- Every Thing in Its Place (1998)
- Twelve Traditions (1999)
- The Case of the Missing Devil Child (2003)
- The Long Walk (2005) with Naomi Kritzer (2006)
- Fire and Ice and Linguine for Two (2007)
- Ishtartu (2008)
- The VanBulyen Effect (2008)
- Jawbone of an Ass (2010)
- Jerome (2012)
- God Box (2014)
- Only Gossamer, My Gown (2019)
- Fate and Your Average Supervillain (2020)
- Sincerely Yours (2022)
- Go Ask A.L.I.C.E. (2023)
