= Carolyn Ives Gilman =

American novelist

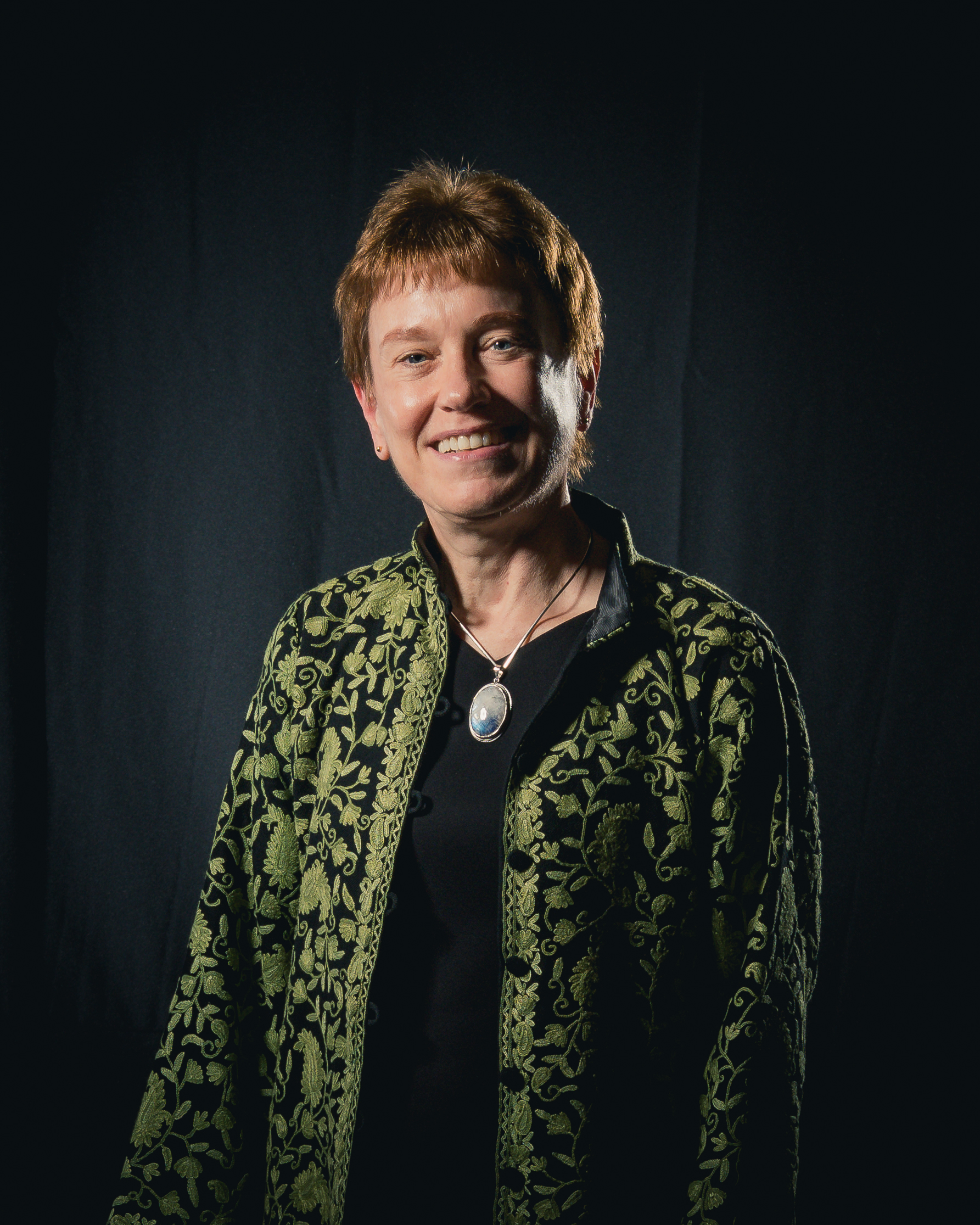
- Gilman at the 75th World Science Fiction Convention in Helsinki, 2017
- Born: 1954 (age 71–72)
- Occupations: Historian; author
- Writing career
- Genres: Science fiction; fantasy

Carolyn Ives Gilman (born 1954) is an American historian and author of science fiction and fantasy. She has been nominated for the Nebula Award three times, and the Hugo Award twice. Her short fiction has been published in a number of magazines and publications, including Fantasy and Science Fiction, Interzone, Realms of Fantasy and Full Spectrum, along with a number of "year's best" anthologies. She is also the author of science fiction novels such as Halfway Human (1998), which is noted for its "groundbreaking" exploration of gender.

== Historian ==
Gilman currently lives in Washington, D.C. where she works as a historian at the National Museum of the American Indian, specializing in 18th- and early 19th-century North American history. She previously worked as a historian at the Missouri Historical Society.

== Writing ==
Her first novel, Halfway Human, was a new entry into the genre of Gender Science Fiction, portraying a world in which humans have three genders: male, female, and neuter. It has been called "one of the most compelling explorations of gender and power in recent SF" and compared favorably to the work of Ursula K. Le Guin. The book placed 2nd in the 1999 Locus Award for Best First Novel, and was nominated for the James Tiptree Jr. Award. Her work is known for vivid portrayals and deconstructions of the culture of the peoples in her stories.

== Bibliography ==
=== Novels ===
Twenty Planets series

- Halfway Human (New York: Avon Books, 1998)
- Arkfall (Rockville, Maryland: Phoenix Pick, 2010)
- The Ice Owl (Rockville, Maryland: Phoenix Pick, 2012)
- Dark Orbit (New York: Tor Books, 2016)

Isles of the Forsaken series

- Isles of the Forsaken (Toronto, Ontario: ChiZine Publications, 2011)
- Ison of the Isles (Toronto, Ontario: ChiZine Publications, 2012)

=== Collections ===
- —— (2007). Aliens of the Heart (paperback 1st ed.). Aqueduct Press. pp. 1–124. ISBN 9781933500171.

=== Short fiction ===
Title	Year	First published	Reprinted/collected	Notes
Candle in a bottle	1996	Gilman, Carolyn Ives (Oct 1996). "Candle in a bottle". F&SF.		
Dreamseed	2000	Gilman, Carolyn Ives (Oct–Nov 2000). "Dreamseed". F&SF. 99 (4&5): 8–31.		Novelette
Okanoggan Falls	2006	Gilman, Carolyn Ives (2006). "Okanoggan Falls". F&SF.		
Arkfall	2008	Gilman, Carolyn Ives (Sep 2008). "Arkfall". F&SF. 115 (3): 62–117.	Gilman, Carolyn Ives (2010). Arkfall. Rockville, Maryland: Phoenix Pick.	Novella
Touring with the alien	2016	Gilman, Carolyn Ives (Apr 2016). "Touring with the alien". Clarkesworld Magazine. 115.		Novelette
Exile's End	2020	Gilman, Carolyn Ives (Aug 2020). "Exile's End". Tor.com.	Clarke, Neil (2022). The Best Science Fiction of the Year: Volume 6. Night Shade Books.	Novelette

=== Non-fiction ===
- Lewis and Clark: Across the Divide (Smithsonian Books, 2003)

== Critical studies and reviews of Gilman's work ==
- Sakers, Don (September 2015). "The Reference Library". Analog Science Fiction and Fact. 135 (9): 105–108.
