= U.S. Route 70 in New Mexico =

Part of the U.S. Highway System

U.S. Highway 70
- US 70 highlighted in red

Route information
- Maintained by NMDOT
- Length: 448.264 mi (721.411 km)
- Existed: 1926–present

Major junctions
- West end: US 70 at the Arizona state line near Virden
- I-10 in Lordsburg; US 180 in Deming; I-10 / US 180 in Las Cruces; I-25 / US 85 in Las Cruces; US 54 from Alamogordo to Tularosa; US 82 in Alamogordo; US 380 from Hondo to Roswell; US 285 in Roswell; US 60 / US 84 in Clovis; US 60 in Texico
- East end: US 70 / US 84 at the Texas state line in Texico

Location
- Country: United States
- State: New Mexico
- Counties: Hidalgo, Grant, Luna, Doña Ana, Otero, Lincoln, Chaves, Roosevelt, Curry

Highway system
- United States Numbered Highway System; List; Special; Divided; New Mexico State Highway System; Interstate; US; State; Scenic
← NM 68	→ NM 72

U.S. Route 70 (US 70) is a part of the U.S. Highway System that travels from Globe, Arizona, east to Atlantic, North Carolina. In the U.S. state of New Mexico, US 70 extends from the Arizona state line south of Virden and ends at the Texas state line in Texico.

== Route description ==
After entering the state of New Mexico, US 70 heads southeast signed as the Duncan Highway. Five miles (8.0 km) after crossing the state line, it serves as the southern terminus for New Mexico State Road 92 (NM-92). US 70 does not have another highway junction for 21 miles (34 km), where it meets New Mexico State Road 464 (NM-464) and New Mexico State Road 90 (NM-90) three miles (4.8 km) north of Lordsburg. At Lordsburg, US 70 joins Business Loop 10 and Motel Drive heading east, and joins Interstate 10 eastbound just outside the city. US 70 and I-10 will run concurrently for the next 114 miles (183 km) before splitting off in Las Cruces at exit 135. Signed as Picacho Avenue, US 70 passes through the unincorporated community of Fairacres and crosses the Rio Grande before meeting Main Street, where it follows it northbound. US 70 then junctions Interstate 25, signed as the Bataan Memorial Highway, and continues as a controlled-access highway until the town of Organ, before entering the foothills of the Organ Mountains.

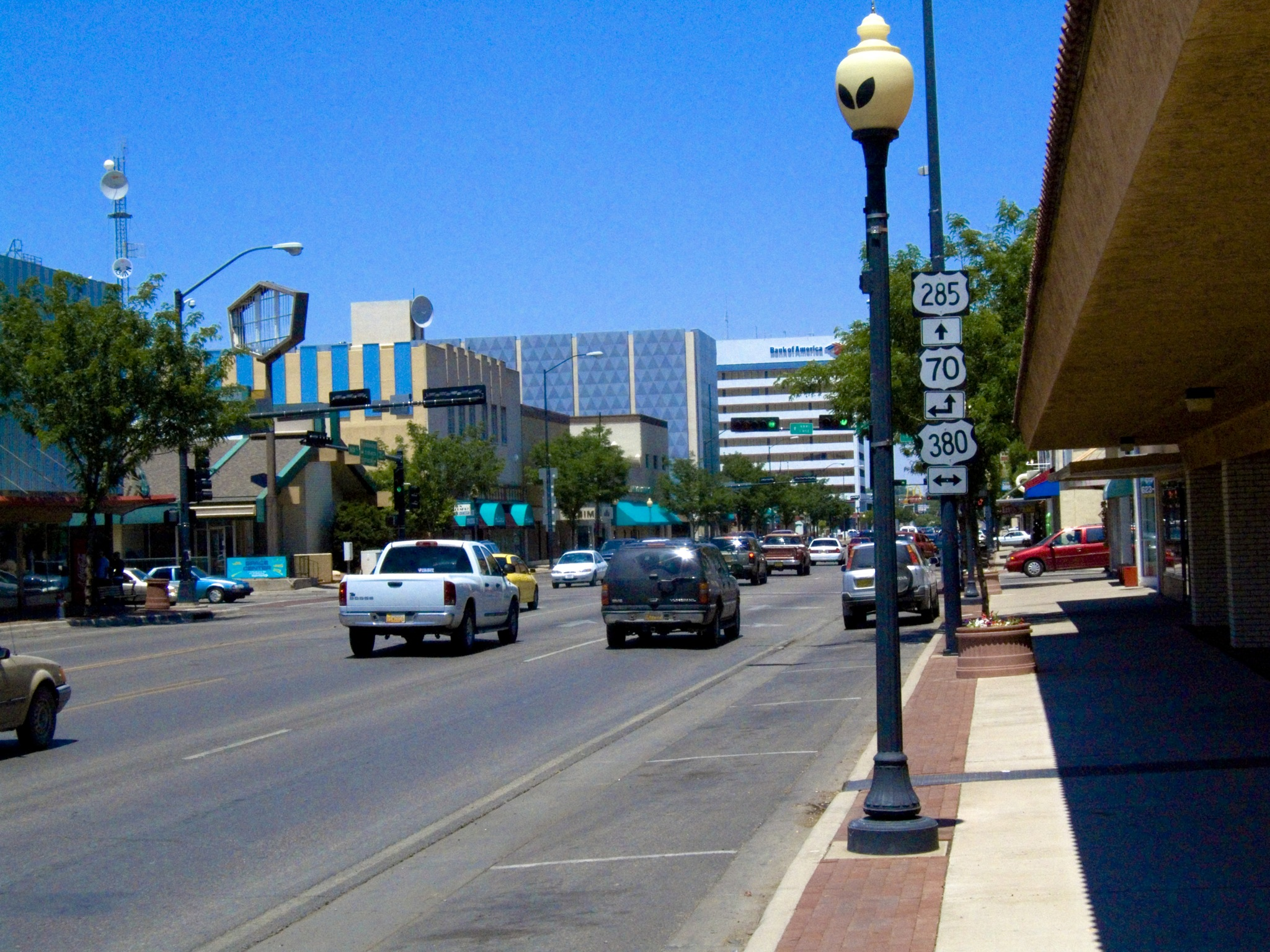
US 70 at the intersection of US 285 and US 380 in Roswell.

As a divided highway, US 70 crosses the Organ Mountains via the San Augustin Pass and descends to the valley floor of the Tularosa Basin, crossing the White Sands Missile Range. Overhead missile tests can close the highway for a few hours; this generally happens once or twice a week, and typically only for an hour at a time. Shortly after the interchange with New Mexico State Highway 213 (NM-213), the speed limit raises to 75 miles per hour (121 km/h) and will continue until a border control checkpoint 1 mile (1.6 km) south of the entrance to White Sands National Park. The road then passes the entrance to White Sands National Park, and shortly after that passes the southern end of Holloman Air Force Base. It then turns northbound, and picks up a concurrency with US 54 upon entering Alamogordo, and continues north on the Charlie Lee Memorial Relief Route, a bypass west of the city. On the north end of Alamogordo, US 54/US 70 intersects the western terminus of US 82 near La Luz, and US 54/US 70 continues north. The concurrency with US 54 lasts until Tularosa, and the highway remains divided until US 70 and US 54 diverge. Continuing northeast, US 70 begins the ascent into the Sacramento Mountains and enters the Lincoln National Forest. The road then runs across the Mescalero Apache Indian Reservation and into the resort towns of Ruidoso and neighboring Ruidoso Downs. In Hondo, US 380 joins for a concurrency. US 70/US 380 then enters Roswell, signed as 2nd Street, with a bypass heading northeast with the US 70/US 285 Truck Route as part of the Roswell Relief Route. US 70 then meets US 285 at Main Street, and joins it northbound for a short concurrency. US 70 then heads northeast at the northern interchange with the Relief Route, continuing as a divided highway. Signed as 2nd Street, US 70 enters Portales, and splits into two one way roads in downtown before rejoining at Boston Avenue. US 70 then turns northeast towards Clovis. Signed as Prince Street, US 70 enters Clovis from the south. Once downtown, US 70 joins US 60/US 84 heading east, and will run concurrently with all three highways until Texico, where US 60 leaves just before the state line, and US 70/US 84 enter Texas.

== History ==
When commissioned in 1926, ran from present day US 70 in Clovis, New Mexico through Vaughn, Willard all the way to Holbrook, Arizona. In 1932, US 70 was rerouted to El Paso, Texas, and the old routing was transferred to US 60 and US 260. In 1934, the routing of US 70 was changed again, to Las Cruces; the old route was transferred to US 54.

On July 12, 2021, US 70 between NASA Road and the entrance of White Sands Missile Range was closed to traffic. The night before, heavy rain from thunderstorms caused about 4 feet (1.2 m) of mud to close the 7-mile (11 km) section. The highway was reopened the next day.

== Junction list ==
County	Location	mi	km	Exit	Destinations	Notes
Arizona state line		0.000	0.000		US 70 west – Duncan, Safford	Continuation into Arizona
Hidalgo		4.200	6.759		NM 92 – Virden	
Hidalgo		25.600	41.199		NM 464 – Redrock	
Hidalgo		27.194	43.765		NM 90 – White Signal, Silver City	
Hidalgo	Lordsburg	29.184 2.067	46.967 3.327		I-10 BL west (Historic US 80 west) to I-10 – Road Forks	Interchange; western end of I-10 Bus. concurrency; former US 80 west; mileposts change to reflect I-10 Bus.
Hidalgo	Lordsburg	2.135	3.436		East Bound Trucks (NM 494 south)	Northern terminus of NM 494
Hidalgo	Lordsburg	4.370	7.033		I-10 BL ends / I-10 – Lordsburg	Eastern end of I-10 Bus. concurrency; western end of I-10 concurrency; I-10 exit 24
See I-10
Doña Ana		141.435	227.618		I-10 east (US 180 east) – Las Cruces, El Paso	Eastern end of I-10 and US 180 concurrencies; I-10 exit 135
Doña Ana	Bridge over the Rio Grande					
Doña Ana	Las Cruces	147.246	236.969		NM 185 / NM 188 – Radium Springs, Mesilla	
Doña Ana	Las Cruces	147.246	236.969		NM 478 south (Main Street) – Anthony	Northern terminus of NM 478; former US 80 east/US 85 south
Doña Ana	Las Cruces	150.699– 150.706	242.527– 242.538	—	I-25 (US 85) – El Paso, Albuquerque	Partial interchange; west end of freeway; I-25 exit 6
Doña Ana	Las Cruces	151.083	243.145	—	Del Rey Boulevard / Telshor Boulevard	Direct eastbound exit and westbound entrance
Doña Ana	Las Cruces	151.700	244.137	—	Roadrunner Parkway	No direct eastbound entrance
Doña Ana	Las Cruces	152.322	245.138	—	Rinconada Boulevard	No direct westbound entrance
Doña Ana	Las Cruces	153.103	246.395	—	Sonoma Ranch Boulevard	
Doña Ana	Las Cruces	154.716	248.991	—	Mesa Grande Drive	
Doña Ana	Las Cruces	155.792	250.723	—	Porter Drive	
Doña Ana	Las Cruces	156.870	252.458	—	Holman Road / Dunn Drive	
Doña Ana		158.493	255.070	—	Weisner Road / Balsam Road	
Doña Ana		160.122	257.691	—	Brahman Road	
Doña Ana	Organ	161.260	259.523	—	NASA Road / Baylor Canyon Road	East end of freeway
Doña Ana		169.946	273.502		Missile Range Headquarters / HTA	Interchange
Otero	Holloman AFB	206.428	332.214		Holloman AFB Main Gate	Partial interchange
Otero	Alamogordo	210.939	339.473		Airport Road - Alamogordo-White Sands Regional Airport	
Otero	Alamogordo	212.789– 213.108	342.451– 342.964		US 54 south / White Sands Boulevard – El Paso, Alamogordo	Interchange; western end of US 54 concurrency; White Sands Boulevard not signed westbound
Otero	Alamogordo	218.211	351.177		US 82 – Artesia, Lubbock	Western terminus of US 82
Otero		220.528	354.905		NM 545 – La Luz	
Otero	Tularosa	228.271– 229.131	367.367– 368.751		US 54 north – Carrizozo	Eastern end of US 54 concurrency
Otero	Mescalero	247.022	397.543		Eagle Drive – Hospital, Bureau of Indian Affairs	Interchange; serves Mescalero Indian Hospital
Otero		251.486	404.727		NM 244 – Cloudcroft	
Lincoln	Ruidoso Downs	261.260	420.457		NM 48 – Capitan	
Lincoln	Hondo	285.031	458.713		US 380 – Capitan	Western end of US 380 concurrency
See US 380
Chaves	Roswell	328.409	528.523		US 285 south (Main Street south) / US 380 east (2nd Street east) – Artesia, Brownfield	Eastern end of US 380 concurrency; western end of US 285 concurrency
Chaves	Roswell	333.432	536.607		NM 246 – Capitan	
Chaves	Roswell	335.533– 335.794	539.988– 540.408	B	US 70 Truck west / US 285 Truck south (Relief Route) / US 285 north – Vaughn, Ruidoso	Interchange; eastern end of US 285 concurrency; exit number is for US 285; no exit number eastbound; US 70 Truck exit A
Roosevelt	Elida	397.526	639.756		NM 114 / NM 330 – Dora, Floyd	
Roosevelt		415.151	668.121		NM 480	
Roosevelt	Portales	417.161	671.356		Airport Road – Portales Municipal Airport	
Roosevelt	Portales	421.447	678.253		NM 206 east (Avenue C) – Dora, Tatum	Western terminus of NM 206
Roosevelt	Portales	421.512	678.358		NM 267 west (Avenue B) – Floyd, Melrose	Eastern terminus of NM 267
Roosevelt	Portales	421.731	678.710		NM 88 east (Abilene Avenue) – Arch	Western terminus of NM 88
Roosevelt	Portales	423.173	681.031		To NM 236 / Spruce Street	
Roosevelt	Portales	423.762	681.979		NM 467 – Clovis	
Roosevelt		426.431	686.274		NM 202	
Curry	Clovis	439.823	707.827		US 60 / US 84 west (1st Street west) / NM 209 north (Prince Street) – Fort Sumner, Vaughn, Santa Rosa	Western end of US 60 and US 84 concurrencies
Curry	See US 60					
Curry	Texico	448.188	721.289		US 60 east (State Street) – Hereford	Eastern end of US 60 concurrency
Texas state line		448.264	721.411		US 70 east / US 84 east – Farwell	Continuation into Farwell, Texas
1.000 mi = 1.609 km; 1.000 km = 0.621 mi: Concurrency terminus; Incomplete access

== Roswell truck route ==
U.S. Highway 70 Truck
- Location: Roswell, New Mexico
- Length: 7.5 mi (12.1 km)

U.S. Route 70 Truck (US 70 Truck) runs for seven and a half miles (12.1 km) around the northwest side of Roswell. For its entire length, it is multiplexed with Roswell's Relief Route ( US 285 Truck).

The entire route is in Chaves County.

Location	mi	km	Exit	Destinations	Notes
Roswell	0.00	0.00		US 285 Truck south (Relief Route south) / US 70 / US 380 (2nd Street) – Artesia, Ruidoso, Roswell	Western terminus; western end of US 285 Truck concurrency; road continues south as US 285 Truck (Relief Route)
	5.0	8.0		NM 246 (Pine Lodge Road) – Bitter Lake National Wildlife Refuge	
	7.1	11.4	A	US 70 west / US 285 south to US 380 junction – Clovis	Interchange; no exit number eastbound
	7.4– 7.5	11.9– 12.1		US 285 Truck end / US 70 east (Clovis Highway) / US 285 north	Interchange; eastern terminus; eastern end of US 285 Truck concurrency; northern terminus of US 285 Truck
1.000 mi = 1.609 km; 1.000 km = 0.621 mi: Concurrency terminus

U.S. Route 70
Previous state: Arizona	New Mexico	Next state: Texas
