= U.S. Route 70 =

Highway in the United States

U.S. Route 70
- US 70 highlighted in red

Route information
- Length: 2,381 mi (3,832 km)
- Existed: 11 November 1926–present
- History: Re-routed several times west of New Mexico between 1926 and 1969.

Major junctions
- West end: US 60 / SR 77 at Globe, AZ
- I-10 at Lordsburg, NM; I-25 / US 85 at Las Cruces, NM; I-27 / US 87 in Plainview, TX; I-35 at Ardmore, OK; I-30 at Little Rock, AR; I-40 / I-55 at Memphis, TN; I-40 / I-65 at Nashville, TN; I-75 at Lenoir City, TN; I-77 at Statesville, NC; I-85 (Numerous times in NC); I-95 at Selma, NC
- East end: Seashore Drive / School Drive in Atlantic, NC

Location
- Country: United States
- States: Arizona, New Mexico, Texas, Oklahoma, Arkansas, Tennessee, North Carolina

Highway system
- United States Numbered Highway System; List; Special; Divided
← US 69	→ US 71

U.S. Route 70 or U.S. Highway 70 (US 70) is an east–west United States highway that runs for 2,381 miles (3,832 km) from eastern North Carolina to east-central Arizona. It is a major east–west highway of the Southeastern, Southern and Southwestern United States. Established as one of the original highways of 1926, it originally ran only to Holbrook, Arizona, then was extended in 1934 as a coast to coast route, with the current eastern terminus near the Atlantic Ocean in Atlantic, North Carolina, and the former western terminus near the Pacific Ocean in Los Angeles, California. Its western end was truncated to Blythe, California in 1963, and was again truncated to US 60 / SR 77 in Globe, Arizona in 1969. Before the completion of the Interstate Highway system, U.S. Highway 70 was sometimes referred to as the "Broadway of America", due to its status as one of the main east–west thoroughfares in the nation. It was also promoted as the "Treasure Trail" by the U.S. Highway 70 Association as of 1951.

In the early years, US 70 had a different route between Clovis, New Mexico and eastern Arizona, taking the route of current US 60 and US 180 to an endpoint in Holbrook. US 70 was later re-routed to El Paso, Texas, when US 60 was extended to California. US 70 was later re-routed again west of Alamogordo, New Mexico along its current route to Globe, as well as being concurrent with US 60 to a common terminus in Los Angeles, California.

== Route description ==
Lengths
	mi	km
AZ	122	196
NM	448	721
TX	255	410
OK	290	467
AR	291	468
TN	480	773
NC	495	797
Total	2,381	3,382

=== Arizona ===
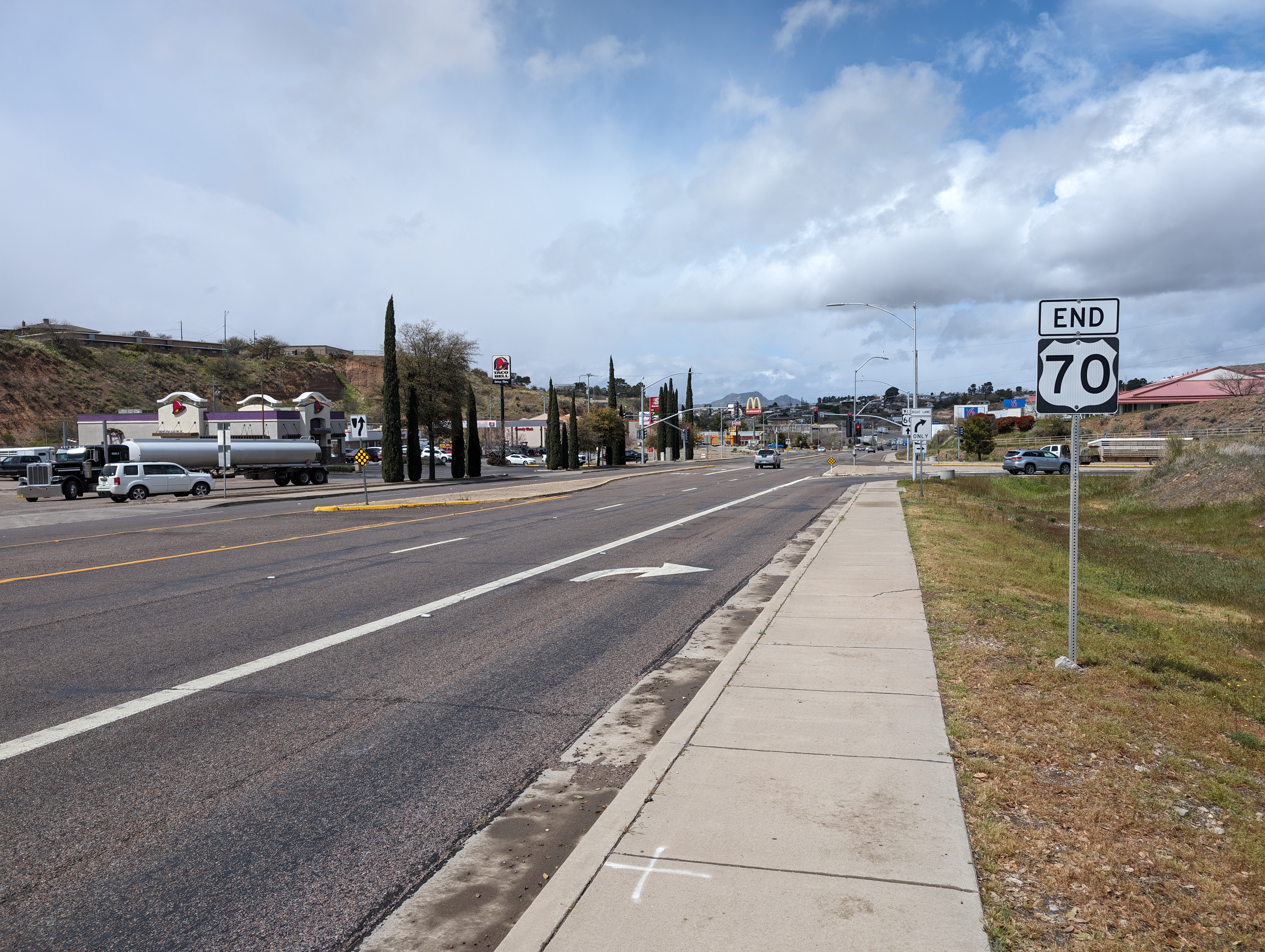
Western terminus at US 60 in Globe, Arizona

U.S. 70 begins in Globe at a junction with U.S. Route 60, concurrent with State Route 77. SR 77 splits off east of town. U.S. 70 then enters the San Carlos Apache Indian Reservation and runs southeast for 17 miles (27 km) to Peridot, where it crosses Indian Route 9. It has no other highway junctions until Safford, where it begins a ten-mile (16 km) overlap with U.S. 191. U.S. 70 then runs an additional 37 mi (60 km). (59 km) before crossing into New Mexico east of Franklin.

=== New Mexico ===
After entering the state of New Mexico, U.S. 70 heads southeast. Five miles (8 km) after crossing the state line, it serves as the southern terminus for New Mexico State Road 92. U.S. 70 does not have another highway junction for 21 mi (34 km), where it meets State Roads 464 and 90 three miles (5 km) north of Lordsburg. At Lordsburg, U.S. 70 joins with Interstate 10 eastbound, splitting off in Las Cruces, and becoming Picacho Avenue in Las Cruces. When Picacho Avenue meets Main Street, US 70 follows Main Street northbound. U.S. 70 then crosses Interstate 25, and has been upgraded at this point to a controlled access highway until entering the foothills of the Organ Mountains.

As a divided highway, U.S. 70 then crosses the Organ Mountains via San Augustin Pass, descends to the valley floor of the Tularosa Basin, and next crosses the White Sands Missile Range. Overhead missile tests can close the highway for a few hours; this generally happens once or twice a week, and typically only for an hour at a time. The road then passes the entrance to White Sands National Park, and shortly after that passes the southern end of Holloman Air Force Base. It then turns northbound, and picks up a concurrency with U.S. 54 upon entering Alamogordo. On the north end of Alamogordo, US54/US70 intersects the beginning of U.S. Route 82 near La Luz. The concurrency with US 54 lasts until Tularosa, and the highway remains divided until US 70 and US 54 diverge. After splitting off to the northeast, U.S. 70 begins an ascent into the Sacramento Mountains and enters the Lincoln National Forest. The road then runs across the Mescalero Apache Indian Reservation and near the resort town of Ruidoso. In Hondo, it begins another concurrency, this time with U.S. 380. U.S. 70 then bypasses Roswell to the northwest, together with U.S. 285. U.S. 70 then heads off to the northeast, running through Portales and Clovis before entering Texas at Texico. From mile 170.6 to mile 197.25 on US 70 the speed limit is posted at 75 mph (120 km/h) across White Sands Missile Range. (26.6-mile stretch) just slightly longer than a standard marathon. US 70 is one of only two non-interstate roadways in New Mexico to receive a speed limit of 75 miles per hour (U.S. 285 between Roswell and Vaughn is also posted at 75 miles per hour).

=== Texas ===
U.S. 70 enters Texas joins with U.S. 60 and U.S. 84. U.S. 60 splits off to the northeast in Farwell, just over the state line. U.S. 70/84 then angle southeast to Muleshoe, where the two routes split. U.S. 70 heads due east, meeting U.S. 385 at Springlake, and having an interchange with Interstate 27 in Plainview. U.S. 70 then arcs toward the south to begin a concurrency with US 62 in Floydada. The two routes head east to Paducah, where US 62 splits off to the north to join with U.S. 83. U.S. 70 then proceeds to Vernon, where it overlaps U.S. 287 and U.S. 183 (and has a junction with U.S. 283). Near Oklaunion, U.S. 70/183 split off to the north to cross the Red River into Oklahoma. The route through Texas was cosigned with Texas State Highway 28 before 1939. SH 28 was designated in 1919 as a route from Muleshoe to Olney with a spur, SH 28A, from SH 28 at Crowell east to the Oklahoma border. In 1922, the route split in Benjamin, going south to Sagerton and east to Olney. In 1926, The portion from Crowell to Sagerton became SH 51, while the portion from Benjamin to Olney became SH 24. SH 28 was instead rerouted over SH 28A to end at the Oklahoma border. By 1939, the route was cancelled due to US 70.

=== Oklahoma ===
U.S. 183 splits away from U.S. 70 three miles (4.8 km) north of the state line, in the town of Davidson. It then has an interchange (Exit 5) with I-44, serving as the southern terminus of the H.E. Bailey Turnpike, one mile (1.6 km) west of the town of Randlett. U.S. 70 then passes south of Waurika. U.S. 70 then becomes a four-lane divided highway near Wilson and runs through Lone Grove before entering the city of Ardmore, where it briefly heads south on Interstate 35, bypassing the central business district. US-70 serves as the southern terminus of U.S. 177 in Madill. U.S. 70 then heads to Durant, where it has an interchange with the U.S. 69/75 freeway.

East of Soper, U.S.70 joins with U.S.271. The two routes then approach Hugo, where they serve as the southern terminus of the Indian Nation Turnpike. U.S. 271 also splits off at this interchange, continuing the freeway southbound from the turnpike. U.S. 70 then heads through downtown Hugo. It then bypasses Idabel to the north (with Bypass U.S. 70 providing a western and southern bypass). It then meets U.S. 259 and State Highway 3 northeast of town and overlaps them into Broken Bow, forming a wrong-way concurrency with SH-3. U.S. 70 then splits off to the east in Broken Bow before leaving the state.

=== Arkansas ===
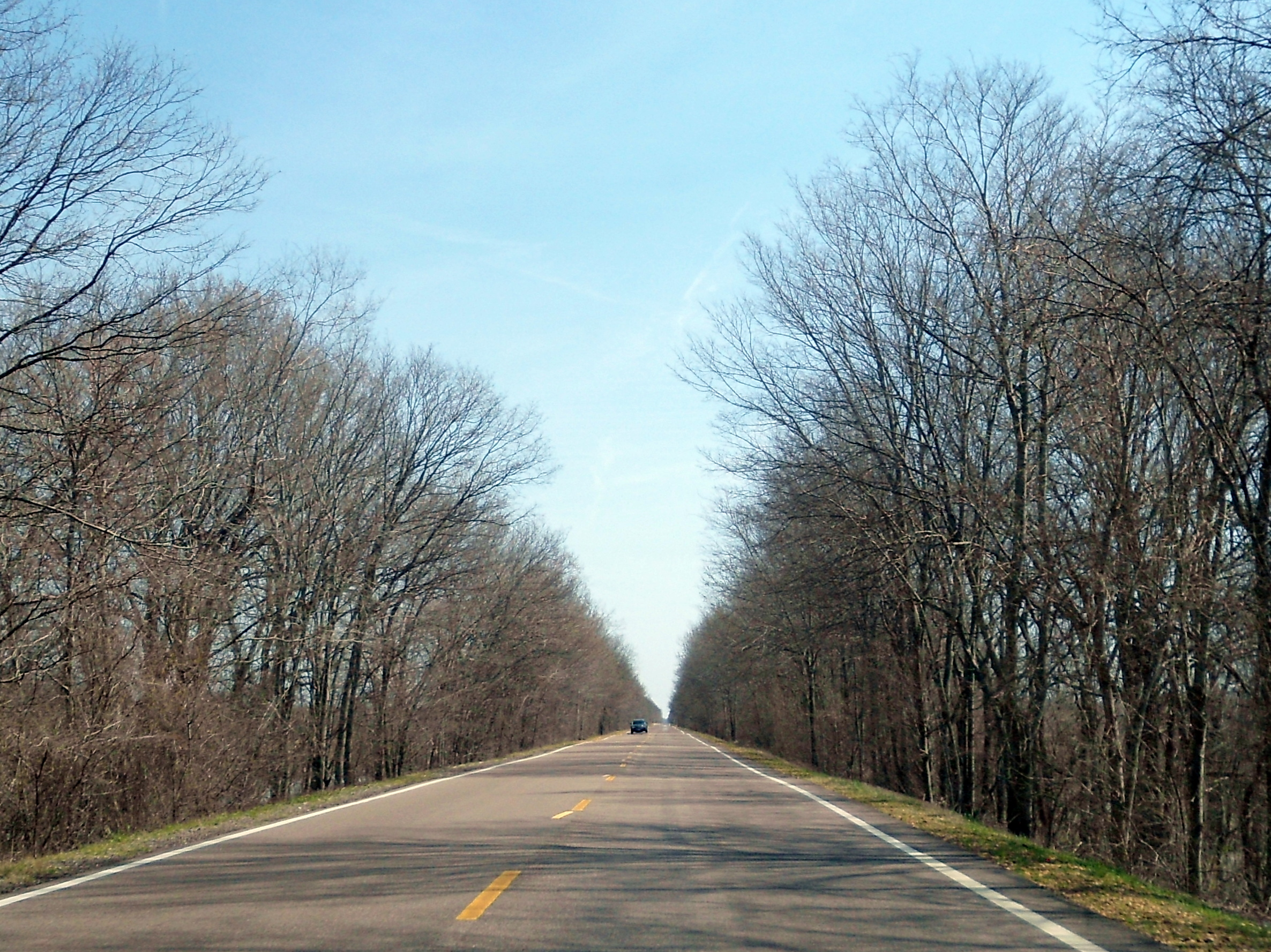
US 70 near Sheffield Nelson Dagmar Wildlife Management Area, Monroe County, Arkansas

U.S. 70 enters Arkansas eight miles (13 km) west of De Queen, and crosses through the north part of the town where it meets the combined U.S. 71/U.S. 59 and overlaps with it for 8 mi (13 km). It then heads northeast to Dierks, where it begins a concurrency with U.S. 278. U.S. 70 then heads east-northeast to Hot Springs, which it bypasses to the south on a freeway alignment shared with U.S. 270. U.S. 70 then heads east to join with Interstate 30 at Exit 111 south of Benton. The two highways run concurrently to the state capital, Little Rock, where U.S. 70 splits off from I-30 at Interstate 430 at Exit 129. U.S. 70 follows Interstate Highway 430 for 1 mile to Exit 1 (Stagecoach Road), where it overlaps Arkansas Highway 5 heading northeast into Little Rock, becoming Colonel Glenn Rd at the intersection with Arkansas Highway 300. Continuing northeast through Little Rock, U.S. 70 turns east again at Roosevelt Road, before turning north through downtown Little Rock as Broadway Street, with during which it crosses Interstate 630 before crossing the Arkansas River into North Little Rock. It then crosses Interstate Highway 30, and serves as the northern terminus of U.S. Route 165. U.S. 70 then crosses Interstate 440 and leaves the Little Rock area, paralleled by I-40.

U.S. 70 continues its alignment near I-40 throughout eastern Arkansas, generally about two or three miles (5 km) apart. I-40 bypasses Forrest City to the north, while U.S. 70 serves the city center. The two routes remain close through West Memphis, Arkansas, where U.S. 70 runs along Broadway Blvd. Finally, U.S. 70 joins with I-55 to cross the Mississippi River into Tennessee.

=== Tennessee ===
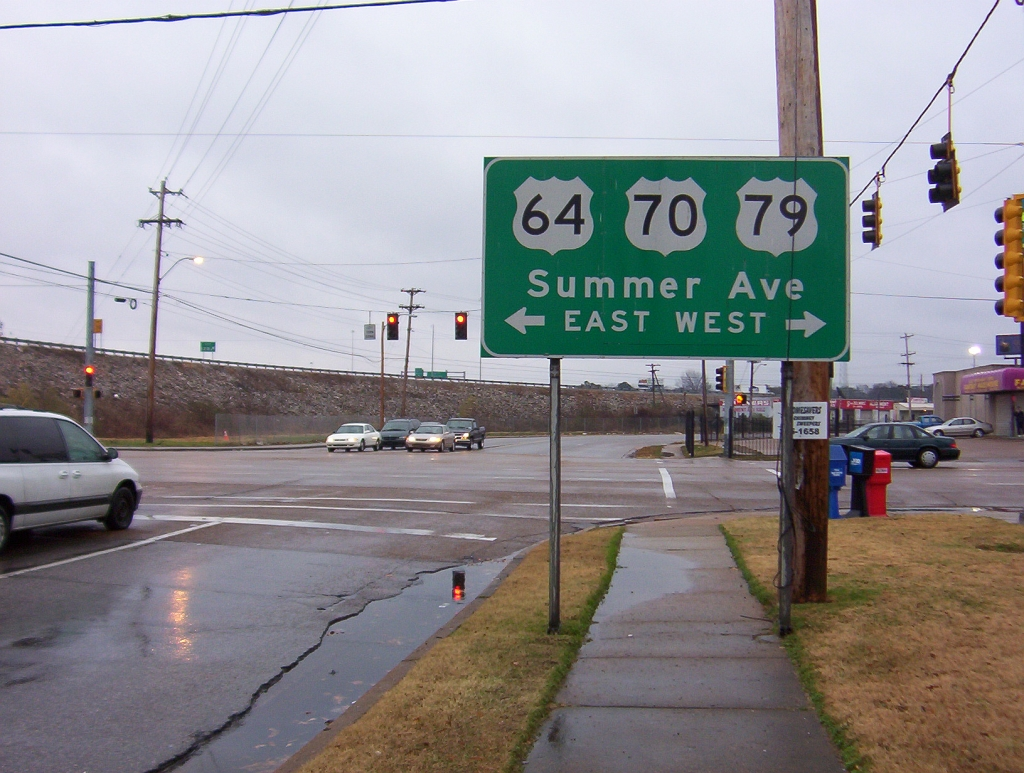
US 64/US 70/US 79 overlap on Summer Avenue in Memphis, Tennessee. (2008)

US 70 enters Tennessee, as well as the city of Memphis, concurrent with Interstate 55, US 61, US 64, and US 79. At exit 12, the northernmost exit on I-55 in the state, I-55 turns south; however, the four US routes continue east onto the at-grade Crump Boulevard. US 61 splits from the concurrency soon afterward, heading south along 3rd Street to exit the city for Walls, Mississippi and points south. US 64, 70 and 79, however, remain overlapped through downtown Memphis, following Danny Thomas Boulevard north to Union Avenue, Union east to East Parkway (briefly overlapping with U.S. Route 51 along the western portion of Union), then East Parkway north to Summer Avenue, where the triple concurrency turns east. Near the city line, US 64/70/79 interchanges with Interstate 40 at exit 12A.

Past the Memphis city limits in the suburb of Bartlett, U.S. 64 separates from U.S. 70/79, taking a more southerly routing through the state. U.S. 70 and US 79, meanwhile, head to the northeast, paralleling I-40 to Brownsville. East of the city, U.S. 79 breaks from U.S. 70, following U.S. 70 Alternate out of the city to the northeast. U.S. 70, now concurrent with only its unsigned designation of State Route 1, heads east, interchanging with I-40 at exit 66 before entering Jackson. The route continues northeastward from the city, meeting I-40 once more at exit 87 just outside the city limits. At Huntingdon, U.S. 70 Alternate rejoins US 70 as the main route turns to the east toward New Johnsonville, where it crosses the Tennessee River.

From the river, U.S. 70 continues eastward through Waverly and Dickson to the Nashville area. Southwest of the city near Pegram, U.S. Route 70S splits off from U.S. 70; however, U.S. 70 now continues to be signed as U.S. 70 instead of U.S. 70N, as it was formerly. U.S. 70 follows I-40 into Nashville, meeting the concurrent I-40/I-65 immediately west of the city center. The route turns south, acting as collector/distributor roads for I-40/I-65 for two blocks before joining U.S. 431 and U.S. 70S on a brief overlap. At an intersection with the concurrent U.S. 31/U.S. 41, U.S. 431 and U.S. 70S split from U.S. 70. U.S. 70 progresses eastward, roughly paralleling the Cumberland River to an interchange with State Route 155 east of downtown. U.S. 70, now paired with State Route 24, heads east out of Nashville to Lebanon, where U.S. Route 70N breaks from the main US 70. US 70 heads southeast, passing through Smithville before rejoining U.S. 70S in Sparta and U.S. 70N to the east in Crossville.

From Crossville eastward to the North Carolina state line, U.S. 70 closely parallels I-40, passing through the Roane County cities of Rockwood and Kingston. At Dixie Lee Junction in eastern Loudon County U.S. 70 intersects U.S. 11 (also known as the Lee Highway), and the two highways are concurrent from the junction intersection eastward through Farragut and into Knoxville. In Farragut and west of downtown Knoxville U.S. 70 carries the name Kingston Pike. Neyland Drive carries U.S. 70 along the Tennessee River to a junction with Hall of Fame Drive. On the east side of Knoxville it becomes concurrent with U.S. 25W and U.S. 11E and carries the name Asheville Highway from Knoxville to the community of Trentville in eastern Knox County. At Trentville, U.S. 11E separates from the concurrency. U.S. 25W remains overlapped with U.S. 70 to Newport, where U.S. 70 is joined by U.S. 25E, which becomes US 25. U.S. 25 and U.S. 70 remain concurrent into North Carolina.

=== North Carolina ===
US 70 enters North Carolina as a two-lane road in concurrency with US 25. Going southeast, it widens to four-lane near Marshall, merging farther down with I-26/US 19/US 23 going into Asheville. In the downtown area, it breaks from the US 19/23 freeway onto city streets and through Beaucatcher Tunnel as it goes east; paralleling north of I-40, going through the cities Marion, Morganton, Hickory, Conover and Statesville. From there, it goes southeast to Salisbury, where it starts to parallel I-85 north through Lexington, Thomasville, High Point and Greensboro, in concurrency with US 29.

After some time in concurrency with US 29 through Thomasville , it exits off with NC 68 and goes north from there. After about 11 miles in concurrency with NC 68, it exits off at an intersection with Wendover Avenue. Now using the name Wendover Avenue, it heads in a northeasterly direction towards central Greensboro and becomes a freeway. After intersecting Westover Terrace, it becomes a partial expressway, intersects US 29 and US 220, and heads east towards Burlington. It downgrades to a two lane rural road heading out of Greensboro, and again parallels north of I-40/I-85. Entering Alamance County, it expands to a four-lane expressway through the city of Burlington, then returns to 2 lanes through Mebane, Efland and Hillsborough. It joins I-85 briefly in Eno, then veers southeast through the downtown areas of both Durham and Raleigh.

Eastern terminus in Atlantic, North Carolina

After a brief overlap with I-40 near Garner, it continues in a southeasterly direction, briefly concurrent with Interstate 42, as it goes through or bypasses the cities of Clayton, Smithfield, Selma, Goldsboro and Kinston. Near and through New Bern, US 70 briefly becomes a freeway but returns to expressway grade after it bypasses Havelock. After passing through Morehead City and Beaufort, it drops back to a two-lane rural road as it travels close along the Core Sound. After passing the southern terminus of NC 12 (which connects to the Outer Banks), near Sealevel, US 70 ends its seven state tour in the community of Atlantic.

== History ==
Most or all of the present route designated as U.S. Route 70 (or U.S. Highway 70 depending on the state) was earlier known as Lee Highway. During the earliest days of the automobile, and earlier, American highways were disorganized affairs of widely varying quality. Highways were known by a bewildering variety of names which typically changed at each town. And they were only named, not numbered.

During the 1910s the first national highway was conceived: the Lincoln Highway, named in honor of Abraham Lincoln, stretching across the northern United States from coast to coast. A companion effort was launched to create a transcontinental highway stretching across the southern half of the country, this one named in honor of Confederate States of America general Robert E. Lee. The two highways were a revolution of sorts, in that a driver could follow a single road from coast to coast bearing the same designation. Much of today's U.S. 70 was formerly the Lee Highway, although that was later removed.

Shield for US 70 in California.

When originally commissioned on 11 November 1926, U.S. Route 70 ran between Beaufort, North Carolina and U.S. Route 66 in Holbrook, Arizona. This older route ran from present day US 70 in Clovis, New Mexico through Vaughn, Willard (where former child route U.S. Route 470 branched off to Albuquerque) and Springerville, Arizona before finally reaching US 66 in Holbrook. In 1932, US 70 was rerouted to El Paso, Texas from Clovis along what is today U.S. Route 54. The re-routing temporarily removed US 70 entirely from Arizona. The old route to Holbrook was replaced by U.S. Route 60 and U.S. Route 260. That same year, the eastern terminus of US 70 was extended to Atlantic, North Carolina, where it remains to this day (albeit in a slightly different location). In 1934, the routing was changed yet again and US 70 was rerouted to California through Las Cruces, New Mexico, Deming, Globe, Arizona and Phoenix to a junction with U.S. Route 99 around Mecca. Between Globe and its new western end in California, US 70 was paired with US 60. A year later, US 70 was extended along Valley Boulevard and reached downtown Los Angeles at U.S. Route 101 running concurrent with US 99 and/or US 60 throughout its course west of Globe. Beginning in 1964 it was decommissioned in favor of Interstate 10 or US 60. After being removed from California, US 70 ended at the California/Arizona state line in Ehrenberg until 1969, when it was further truncated to its current endpoint in Globe. US 70, unlike many other decommissioned US Highways in California, doesn't have a state route that was numbered after it and taking over its path (unlike US 60, which had State Route 60 to replace it), due to the fact that it was replaced in its entirety by I-10. Therefore, the current State Route 70 bears no relation to this highway.

Robert Mitchum and Don Raye's song, "The Ballad of Thunder Road" immortalized in the 1958 film of the same name, follows a family of anarchistic moonshiners who engage in run-ins with the police. The Mitchum film is based on a real life incident in which a moonshiner perishes on the road on the Kingston Pike stretch of Highway 70 in Knoxville while on the run from the police, although the actual filming did not take place on Highway 70.

=== Historic alignments ===
Old and bypassed sections of US 70 exist, and at least one such road section has been listed on the National Register of Historic Places. It is located in Lonoke County, Arkansas, between Young Road and point east of the present US 70's junction with Arkansas Highway 15. About 4 miles (6.4 km) long, it runs mostly parallel to, and just north of, the present alignment, jogging a bit farther around the AR 15 junction. It was built about 1913, and some of its original bituminous pavement survives. It was replaced by the present alignment in 1930–31. Between Florence, Arizona and Wickenburg, Arizona, US 70 ran concurrently with both US 60 and US 89.

== Major intersections ==
Arizona
US 60 in Globe
US 191 in Safford. The highways travel concurrently to southeast of San Jose.
New Mexico
I-10 in Lordsburg. The highways travel concurrently to Las Cruces.
US 180 in Deming. The highways travel concurrently to Las Cruces.
I-25 / US 85 in Las Cruces
US 54 in Alamogordo. The highways travel concurrently to Tularosa.
US 82 in Alamogordo
US 380 in Hondo. The highways travel concurrently to Roswell.
US 285 / US 380 in Roswell. US 70/US 285 travels concurrently to north of Roswell.
US 60 / US 84 in Clovis. US 60/US 70 travels concurrently to Texico. US 70/US 84 travels concurrently to Muleshoe, Texas.
Texas
US 385 in Springlake
I-27 / US 87 in Plainview
US 62 in Floydada. The highways travel concurrently to Paducah.
US 62 / US 83 in Paducah
US 287 in Vernon. The highways travel concurrently to Oklaunion.
US 183 / US 283 in Vernon. US 70/US 183 travels concurrently to Davidson, Oklahoma.
Oklahoma
I-44 / US 277 / US 281 west-southwest of Randlett. US 70/US 277/US 281 travels concurrently to Randlett.
US 81 in Waurika
I-35 in Ardmore. The highways travel concurrently through Ardmore.
US 77 in Ardmore
US 377 in Madill. The highways travel concurrently through Madill.
US 69 / US 75 in Durant
US 271 east-northeast of Soper. The highways travel concurrently to south of Hugo.
US 259 in Idabel. The highways travel concurrently to Broken Bow.
Arkansas
US 59 / US 71 / US 371 in De Queen. The highways travel concurrently to north-northwest of Lockesburg.
US 278 in Dierks. The highways travel concurrently to north-northeast of Dierks.
US 270 in Hot Springs. The highways travel concurrently through Hot Springs.
I-30 northwest of Haskell. The highways travel concurrently to Little Rock.
US 67 southwest of Benton. The highways travel concurrently to Little Rock.
I-430 in Little Rock
I-630 in Little Rock
I-30 / US 65 / US 67 / US 167 in Little Rock
US 165 in North Little Rock
I-440 in North Little Rock
US 63 in Hazen. The highways travel concurrently through Hazen.
US 49 in Brinkley. The highways travel concurrently through Brinkley.
US 79 south of Jennette
I-55 / US 61 / US 64 / US 79 in West Memphis. I-55/US 61/US 70 travels concurrently to Memphis, Tennessee. US 64/US 70 travels concurrently to the Memphis–Bartlett, Tennessee city line. US 70/US 79 travels concurrently to Brownsville, Tennessee.
Tennessee
US 78 in Memphis
US 51 in Memphis. The highways travel concurrently through Memphis.
I-240 in Memphis
US 72 in Memphis
I-40 in Memphis
I-269 in Arlington
I-40 east of Brownsville
US 45 in Jackson
US 412 northeast of Jackson. The highways travel concurrently for approximately 0.5 miles (0.80 km).
I-40 / US 412 northeast of Jackson
US 641 south of Camden
US 70S in Nashville
I-40 in Nashville
I-40 / I-65 in Nashville. The highways travel concurrently, but on different lanes, through Nashville.
US 70S / US 431 in Nashville. The highways travel concurrently through Nashville.
US 231 in Lebanon
US 70N in Lebanon
I-40 in Lebanon
US 70N in Crossville
US 127 in Crossville
US 27 south-southwest of Rockwood. The highways travel concurrently to Rockwood.
US 321 in Lenoir City
US 11 southwest of Farragut. The highways travel concurrently to Knoxville.
I-140 in Knoxville.
I-40 / I-75 in Knoxville
US 129 in Knoxville
US 441 in Knoxville. The highways travel concurrently through Knoxville.
I-40 / I-275 in Knoxville
US 11 / US 11E / US 11W in Knoxville. US 11E/US 70 travels concurrently to south-southeast of Mascot.
I-40 / US 25W in Knoxville. US 25W/US 70 travels concurrently to Newport.
I-40 west of Dandridge
US 411 in Newport. The highways travel concurrently through Newport
I-40 / US 411 in Newport
US 25 / US 25E / US 25W in Newport. US 25/US 70 travels concurrently to Woodfin, North Carolina.
US 321 in Newport. The highways travel concurrently through Newport.
North Carolina
Future I-26 / US 19 / US 23. The highways travel concurrently to Asheville.
US 25 in Asheville
Future I-26 / I-240 / US 19 / US 23 in Asheville. I-240/US 70 travels concurrently through Asheville.
I-240 in Asheville
I-40 in Black Mountain. The highways travel concurrently to southwest of Old Fort.
US 221 in Marion
US 64 in Morganton. The highways travel concurrently through Morganton.
US 321 in Hickory
US 64 in Statesville
US 21 in Statesville
I-77 in Statesville
US 601 in Salisbury. The highways travel concurrently through Salisbury.
US 29 / US 601 in Salisbury. US 29/US 70 travels concurrently to Greensboro.
I-85 / US 52 northeast of Spencer. I-85/US 70 travels concurrently to southwest of Lexington. US 52/US 70 travels concurrently to west of Lexington.
I-85 / I-285 southwest of Lexington. I-285/US 70 travel concurrently to west of Lexington.
US 64 in Lexington. The highways travel concurrently through Lexington.
I-74 in High Point
I-73 / US 421 in Greensboro.
US 220 in Greensboro. The highways travel concurrently through Greensboro.
US 29 / US 220 in Greensboro.
I-840 in Greensboro
I-85 in Eno. The highways travel concurrently to Durham.
US 15 / US 501 in Durham. The highways travel concurrently through Durham.
I-540 in Raleigh
I-440 / US 1 in Raleigh
US 401 in Raleigh. The highways travel concurrently through Raleigh.
I-40 / US 64 in Raleigh
I-40 near Garner
I-42 near Clayton
US 301 in Selma
I-95 in Selma
I-795 in Goldsboro
US 13 / US 117 in Goldsboro. The highways travel concurrently through Goldsboro.
US 258 in Kinston. The highways travel concurrently through Kinston.
US 17 west of New Bern. The highways travel concurrently to the New Bern–James City city line.
Seashore Drive/School Drive in Atlantic

== Special routes ==
=== Branch routes ===
In Tennessee, US-70 has two additional branches: US-70N and US-70S. This split is unique for two reasons. First, it is the only existing instance of a N/S split of a U.S. Route (all the others are E/W splits). Second, US-70 does not "disappear" at these splits, allowing the two branch highways to both co-exist with and serve as alternates to the main route. US-70N begins in Lebanon, just east of Nashville, and ends in Crossville; US-70S begins in the Bellevue neighborhood of southwest Nashville, and ends in Sparta (a few miles west of Crossville). Historically, both split routes began in Pegram and ended in Crossville. The original designation for US-70 between Lebanon and Sparta was TN-26.

=== Alternate routes ===
There are currently two active alternate routes, all signed and marked on maps as US 70A.

- Brownville-Huntingdon, Tennessee
- Pine Level, North Carolina

=== Business routes ===
- Pomona, California Decommissioned
- Alamogordo, New Mexico
- Ruidoso, New Mexico
- Portales, New Mexico
- Hugo, Oklahoma
- De Queen, Arkansas
- Glenwood, Arkansas
- Hot Springs, Arkansas
- Little Rock, Arkansas
- Huntingdon, Tennessee
- Camden, Tennessee
- Dickson, Tennessee
- Lebanon, Tennessee
- Marshall, North Carolina
- Morganton, North Carolina
- Lexington, North Carolina
- Hillsborough, North Carolina
- Durham, North Carolina
- Clayton, North Carolina
- Smithfield, North Carolina
- Goldsboro, North Carolina
- Kinston, North Carolina
- Newport, North Carolina
- New Bern, North Carolina

=== Bypass routes ===
- Durant, Oklahoma Bypass construction begin 2008
- Idabel, Oklahoma
- Selma, North Carolina
- Clayton, North Carolina
- Goldsboro, North Carolina

== See also ==
- Interstate 40
- National Register of Historic Places listings in Lonoke County, Arkansas

=== Related routes ===
- U.S. Route 170
- U.S. Route 270
- U.S. Route 370
- U.S. Route 470

Browse numbered routes
← SR 68	CA	→ SR 70
← SR 69	AZ	→ SR 71
← SH 69	TX	→ SH 70
← US 69	OK	→ SH-71
← AR 69	AR	→ US 71
← SR 69	TN	→ SR 70
← NC 69	NC	→ NC 71
