= New Mexico State Road 267 =

State highway in New Mexico, United States

State Road 267
- NM 267 highlighted in red

Route information
- Maintained by NMDOT
- Length: 32.389 mi (52.125 km)
- Existed: 1988–present

Major junctions
- South end: US 70 in Portales
- NM 236 in Portales; NM 330 near Floyd
- North end: US 60 / US 84 in Melrose

Location
- Country: United States
- State: New Mexico
- Counties: Roosevelt, Curry

Highway system
- New Mexico State Highway System; Interstate; US; State; Scenic
← NM 266	→ NM 268

State Road 267 (NM 267) is a 32.389-mile-long (52.125 km) state highway in the U.S. state of New Mexico. NM 267's southern terminus is at U.S. Route 70 (US 70) in Portales, and the northern terminus is at US 60 and US 84 just east of the village of Melrose.

== Route description ==
NM 267 begins at US 70 in Portales. Before leaving the city of Portales it serves the western terminus of NM 236. NM 267 then passes through the village of Floyd. After leaving Floyd it serves the eastern terminus of NM 330 then the western terminus of NM 236. It then crosses from Roosevelt County to Curry County. It then ends at US 60 and US 84 just east of the village of Melrose.

== History ==
Created in 1988 during the New Mexico 1988 Highway Renumbering as a former part of NM 88.

== Major intersections ==
County	Location	mi	km	Destinations	Notes
Roosevelt	Portales	0.000	0.000	US 70 (Second Street) – Roswell, Clovis	Southern terminus
Roosevelt	Portales	0.285	0.459	NM 236 west (First Street) – Bethel	Eastern terminus of NM 236
Roosevelt		18.165	29.234	NM 330 south (South Roosevelt Road 3) – Elida	Northern terminus of NM 330
Roosevelt		21.000	33.796	NM 236 east (Base Line Road) – Bethel	Western terminus of NM 236
Curry	Melrose	32.389	52.125	US 60 / US 84 (Denby Avenue) – Fort Sumner, Clovis	Northern terminus
1.000 mi = 1.609 km; 1.000 km = 0.621 mi
