= List of municipalities in New Mexico =

Cities in New Mexico

Map of the United States with New Mexico highlighted

New Mexico is a state located in the Western United States. According to the 2020 United States census, New Mexico is the 15th least-populous state with 2,117,522 inhabitants but the 5th-largest by land area, spanning 121,298.15 square miles (314,160.8 km^{2}). New Mexico is divided into 33 counties and contains 106 municipalities consisting of cities, towns, villages and an incorporated county. New Mexico's municipalities cover only 1% of the state's land mass but are home to 65.4% of its population.

All municipalities are granted local government powers including the collection of property tax, funding of fire protection and public transit, providing and maintaining public parks, cemeteries, hospitals, libraries, and museums, building and zoning regulations, and the maintenance of municipal water, sewer, electric, natural gas and solid waste utilities. Municipalities in New Mexico may adopt one of five forms of municipal government including Mayor-Council, Mayor-Council with Manager, Council-Manager, Commission-Manager, or City-County Council-Manager. All municipalities over 10,000 people must elect their representatives by district, with those under 10,000 having option to do so. Citizens in a Mayor-Council form of government elect a mayor (who only votes to break a tie, and does not have veto power), and a council of 4 to 10 councilors or trustees. Any municipality with a population over 1,000 with a Mayor/Council form of government may establish the office of manager who is not elected and administers the hiring and firing of municipal employees, enforces ordinances, prepares the budget, but cannot vote on council. The manager in a Commission/Manager municipality has identical powers to the manager in the Mayor/Council form of government. Mayor-Council system can be changed to a Commission/Manager municipality by popular vote if the population exceeds 3,000. Citizens in a Commission/Manager municipality may also vote on initiatives, referendums and recalls and the mayor has the right to vote on council issues. Only one municipality, Los Alamos, is an incorporated City-County with a Council-Manager system through the Los Alamos County Charter. Municipalities may also adopt a home rule charter which gives local municipalities powers not specifically authorized for municipalities by the state statutes. Twelve municipalities have adopted home rule or a charter in New Mexico.

The largest municipality by population in New Mexico is Albuquerque with 564,559 residents or approximately 26.7% of the state population. The smallest municipality by population is Grenville with 22 residents. The largest municipality by land area is also Albuquerque which spans 187.73 mi^{2} (486.2 km^{2}), while Virden is the smallest at 0.22 mi^{2} (0.57 km^{2}).

== List of municipalities ==
Largest municipalities in New Mexico by population

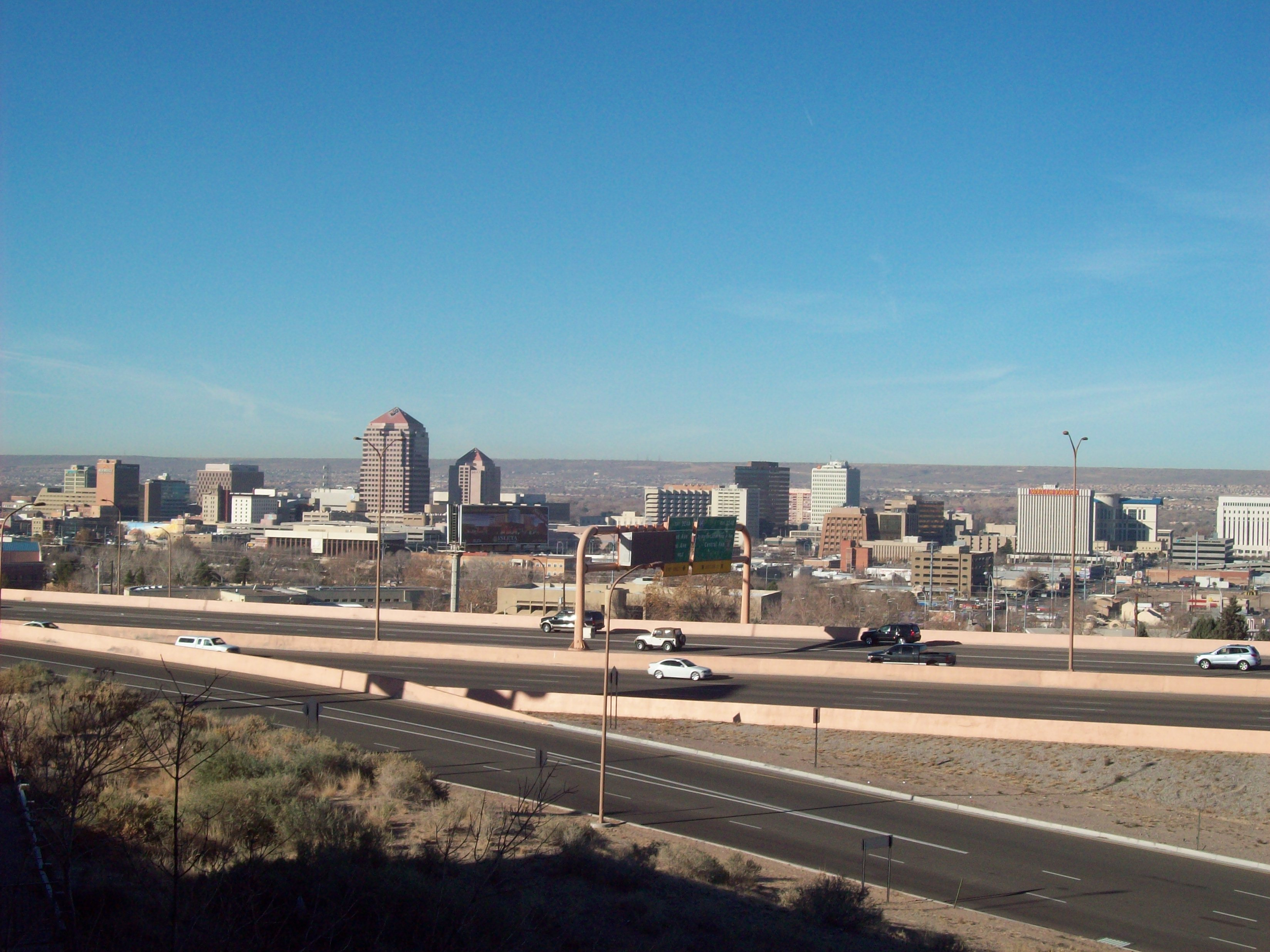
Skyline of Albuquerque, largest municipality in New Mexico

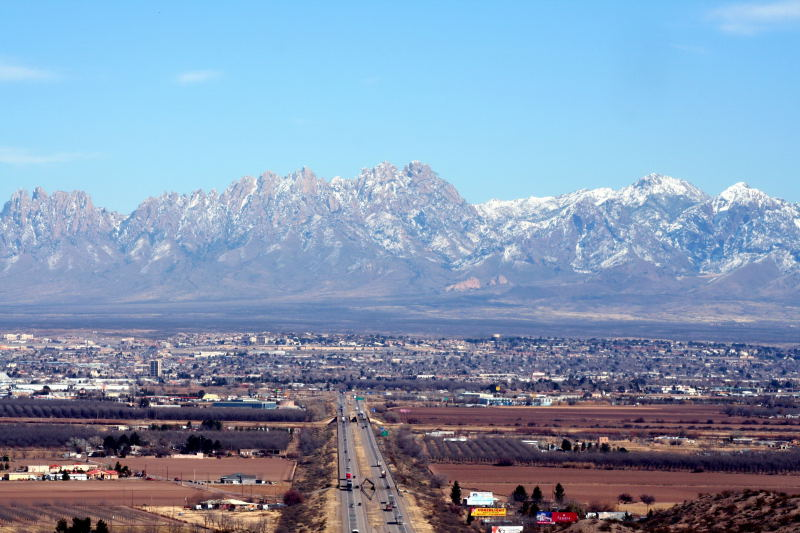
Las Cruces, second largest municipality in New Mexico

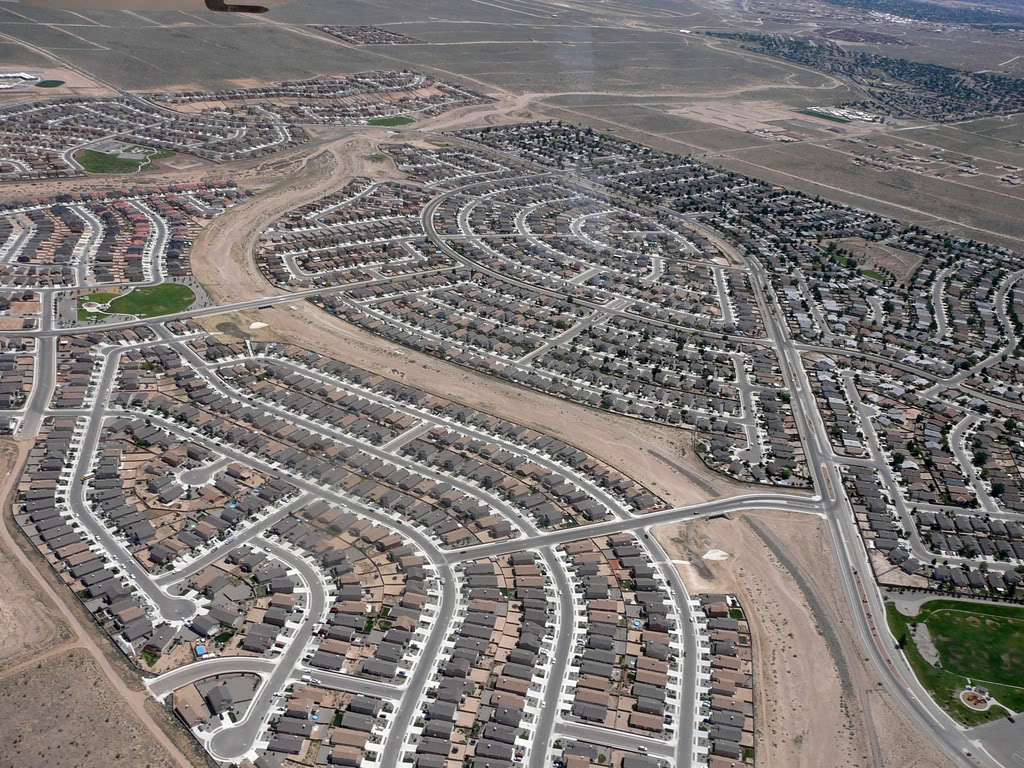
Aerial view of suburban Rio Rancho, New Mexico's third largest municipality

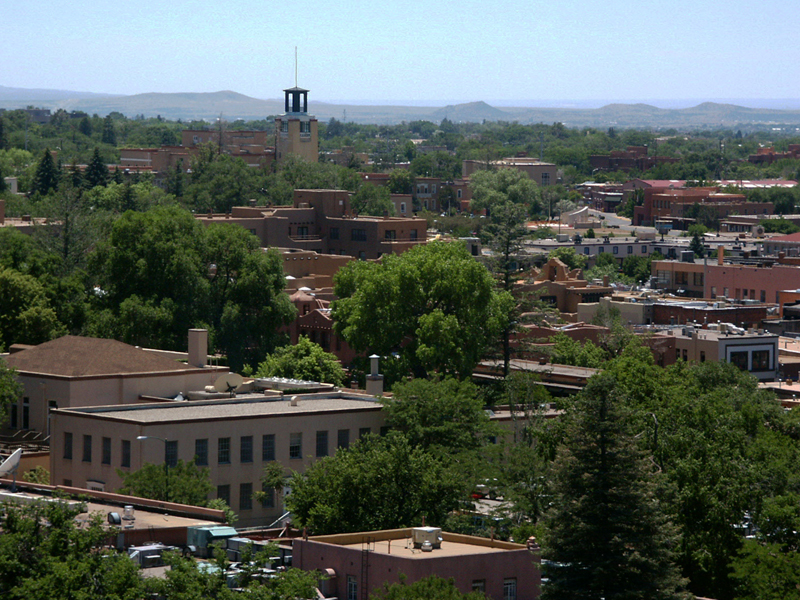
Santa Fe, capital and fourth largest municipality of New Mexico

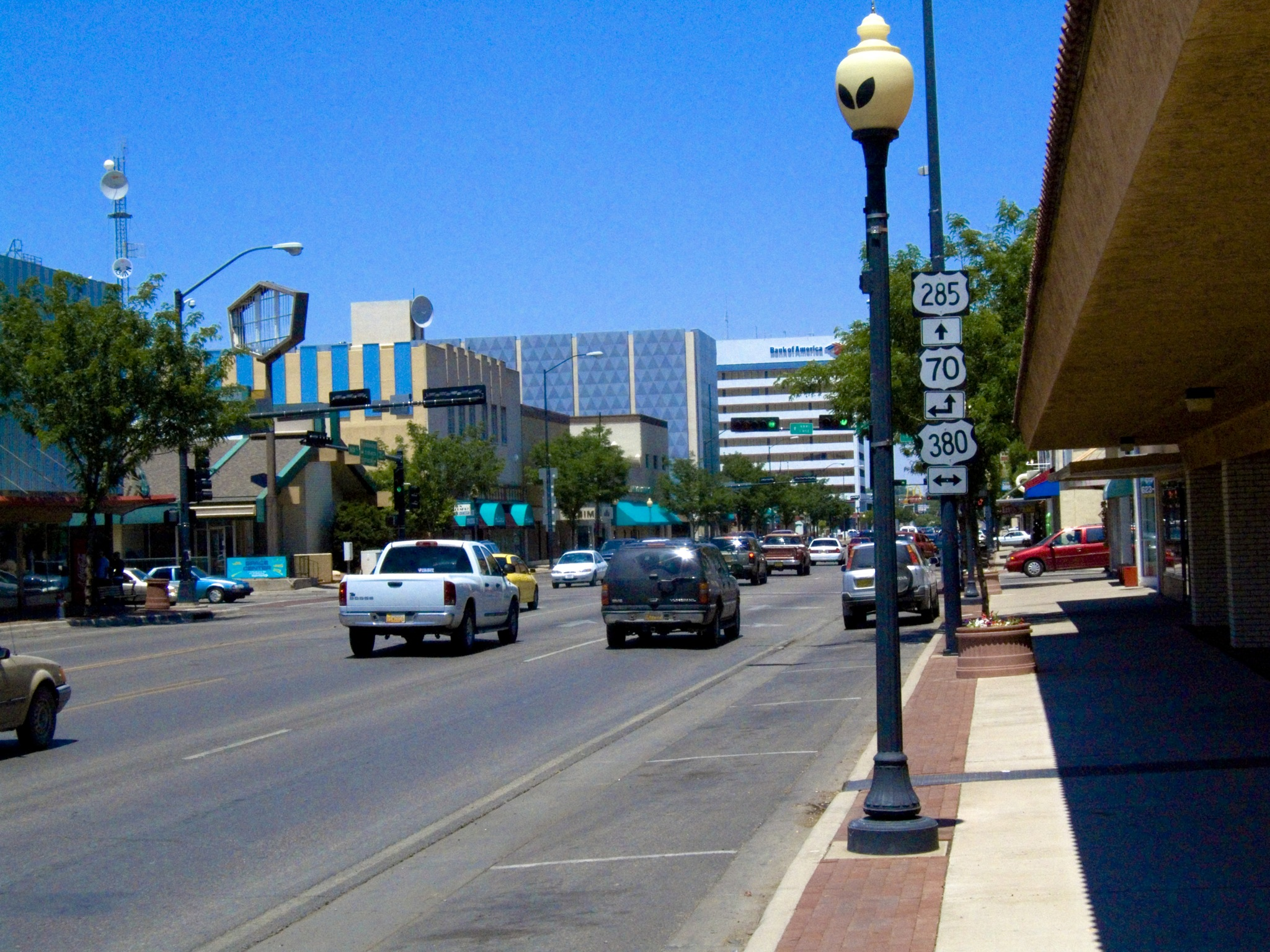
Downtown Roswell, New Mexico's fifth largest municipality

‡ State capital and county seat

† County seat

§ Home rule or chartered

Name	Type	Government type	County(ies)	Population (2020)	Population (2010)	Change	Land area (2020)		Population density
Name	Type	Government type	County(ies)	Population (2020)	Population (2010)	Change	sq mi	km^{2}	Population density
Alamogordo†	City	Commission–Manager §	Otero	30,898	30,403	+1.6%	21.39	55.4	1,444.5/sq mi (557.7/km^{2})
Albuquerque†	City	Mayor–Council §	Bernalillo	564,559	545,852	+3.4%	187.27	485.0	3,014.7/sq mi (1,164.0/km^{2})
Angel Fire	Village	Mayor–Council	Colfax	1,192	1,216	−2.0%	28.81	74.6	41.4/sq mi (16.0/km^{2})
Anthony (Note: The city incorporated on July 1, 2010, and is thus not represented in the 2010 census as a city, but only as a census designated place. The populations and area for the Anthony CDP is included here, but not in the totals.)	City	Mayor–Council	Doña Ana	8,693	9,360	−7.1%	2.70	7.0	3,219.6/sq mi (1,243.1/km^{2})
Artesia	City	Mayor–Council	Eddy	12,875	11,301	+13.9%	11.33	29.3	1,136.4/sq mi (438.8/km^{2})
Aztec†	City	Commission–Manager	San Juan	6,201	6,763	−8.3%	17.06	44.2	363.5/sq mi (140.3/km^{2})
Bayard	City	Mayor–Council	Grant	2,116	2,328	−9.1%	0.95	2.5	2,227.4/sq mi (860.0/km^{2})
Belen	City	Mayor–Council with Manager	Valencia	7,360	7,269	+1.3%	18.96	49.1	388.2/sq mi (149.9/km^{2})
Bernalillo†	Town	Mayor–Council	Sandoval	8,977	8,320	+7.9%	4.89	12.7	1,835.8/sq mi (708.8/km^{2})
Bloomfield	City	Mayor–Council	San Juan	7,421	8,112	−8.5%	18.55	48.0	400.1/sq mi (154.5/km^{2})
Bosque Farms	Village	Mayor–Council	Valencia	4,020	3,904	+3.0%	3.94	10.2	1,020.3/sq mi (393.9/km^{2})
Capitan	Village	Mayor–Council	Lincoln	1,391	1,489	−6.6%	3.26	8.4	405.2/sq mi (156.5/km^{2})
Carlsbad†	City	Mayor–Council with Manager	Eddy	32,238	26,138	+23.3%	31.52	81.6	1,022.8/sq mi (394.9/km^{2})
Carrizozo†	Town	Mayor–Council	Lincoln	972	996	−2.4%	8.36	21.7	116.3/sq mi (44.9/km^{2})
Causey	Village	Mayor–Council	Roosevelt	68	104	−34.6%	3.75	9.7	18.1/sq mi (7.0/km^{2})
Chama	Village	Mayor–Council	Rio Arriba	917	1,022	−10.3%	2.59	6.7	354.1/sq mi (136.7/km^{2})
Cimarron	Village	Mayor–Council	Colfax	792	1,021	−22.4%	2.12	5.5	373.6/sq mi (144.2/km^{2})
Clayton†	Town	Mayor–Council with Manager	Union	2,643	2,980	−11.3%	7.77	20.1	340.2/sq mi (131.3/km^{2})
Cloudcroft	Village	Mayor–Council	Otero	750	674	+11.3%	1.64	4.2	457.3/sq mi (176.6/km^{2})
Clovis†	City	Commission–Manager §	Curry	38,567	37,775	+2.1%	23.63	61.2	1,632.1/sq mi (630.2/km^{2})
Columbus	Village	Mayor–Council	Luna	1,442	1,664	−13.3%	4.67	12.1	308.8/sq mi (119.2/km^{2})
Corona	Village	Mayor–Council	Lincoln	129	172	−25.0%	1.03	2.7	125.2/sq mi (48.4/km^{2})
Corrales	Village	Mayor–Council	Sandoval	8,493	8,329	+2.0%	10.79	27.9	787.1/sq mi (303.9/km^{2})
Cuba	Village	Mayor–Council	Sandoval	628	731	−14.1%	3.26	8.4	192.6/sq mi (74.4/km^{2})
Deming†	City	Mayor–Council with Manager	Luna	14,758	14,855	−0.7%	16.72	43.3	882.7/sq mi (340.8/km^{2})
Des Moines	Village	Mayor–Council	Union	117	143	−18.2%	0.87	2.3	134.5/sq mi (51.9/km^{2})
Dexter	Town	Mayor–Council	Chaves	1,074	1,266	−15.2%	0.73	1.9	1,471.2/sq mi (568.0/km^{2})
Dora	Village	Mayor–Council	Roosevelt	117	133	−12.0%	2.63	6.8	44.5/sq mi (17.2/km^{2})
Eagle Nest	Village	Mayor–Council	Colfax	315	290	+8.6%	4.48	11.6	70.3/sq mi (27.1/km^{2})
Edgewood	Town	Commission-Manager	Santa Fe	6,174	3,735	+65.3%	56.80	147.1	108.7/sq mi (42.0/km^{2})
Elephant Butte	City	Mayor–Council	Sierra	1,447	1,431	+1.1%	4.18	10.8	346.2/sq mi (133.7/km^{2})
Elida	Town	Mayor–Council	Roosevelt	166	197	−15.7%	1.02	2.6	162.7/sq mi (62.8/km^{2})
Encino	Village	Mayor–Council	Torrance	51	82	−37.8%	1.99	5.2	25.6/sq mi (9.9/km^{2})
Española	City	Mayor–Council with Manager	Rio Arriba; Santa Fe	10,526	10,224	+3.0%	8.22	21.3	1,280.5/sq mi (494.4/km^{2})
Estancia†	Town	Mayor–Council	Torrance	1,242	1,655	−25.0%	6.17	16.0	201.3/sq mi (77.7/km^{2})
Eunice	City	Mayor–Council	Lea	3,056	2,562	+19.3%	4.09	10.6	747.2/sq mi (288.5/km^{2})
Farmington	City	Mayor–Council with Manager	San Juan	46,624	45,877	+1.6%	34.46	89.3	1,353.0/sq mi (522.4/km^{2})
Floyd	Village	Mayor–Council	Roosevelt	86	133	−35.3%	3.05	7.9	28.2/sq mi (10.9/km^{2})
Folsom	Village	Mayor–Council	Union	51	56	−8.9%	0.65	1.7	78.5/sq mi (30.3/km^{2})
Fort Sumner†	Village	Mayor–Council	De Baca	889	1,031	−13.8%	3.32	8.6	267.8/sq mi (103.4/km^{2})
Gallup†	City	Mayor–Council with Manager §	McKinley	21,899	21,678	+1.0%	20.19	52.3	1,084.6/sq mi (418.8/km^{2})
Grady	Village	Mayor–Council	Curry	86	107	−19.6%	0.27	0.70	318.5/sq mi (123.0/km^{2})
Grants†	City	Mayor–Council with Manager §	Cibola	9,163	9,182	−0.2%	14.91	38.6	614.6/sq mi (237.3/km^{2})
Grenville	Village	Mayor–Council	Union	22	38	−42.1%	0.38	0.98	57.9/sq mi (22.4/km^{2})
Hagerman	Town	Mayor–Council	Chaves	975	1,257	−22.4%	1.36	3.5	716.9/sq mi (276.8/km^{2})
Hatch	Village	Mayor–Council	Doña Ana	1,539	1,648	−6.6%	3.01	7.8	511.3/sq mi (197.4/km^{2})
Hobbs	City	Commission–Manager §	Lea	40,508	34,122	+18.7%	26.40	68.4	1,534.4/sq mi (592.4/km^{2})
Hope	Village	Mayor–Council	Eddy	113	105	+7.6%	1.22	3.2	92.6/sq mi (35.8/km^{2})
House	Village	Mayor–Council	Quay	56	68	−17.6%	0.91	2.4	61.5/sq mi (23.8/km^{2})
Hurley	Town	Mayor–Council	Grant	1,256	1,297	−3.2%	1.02	2.6	1,231.4/sq mi (475.4/km^{2})
Jal	City	Mayor–Council	Lea	2,202	2,047	+7.6%	4.82	12.5	456.8/sq mi (176.4/km^{2})
Jemez Springs	Village	Mayor–Council	Sandoval	198	250	−20.8%	4.80	12.4	41.3/sq mi (15.9/km^{2})
Kirtland (Note: The town incorporated on January 6, 2015, and is thus not represented in the 2010 census.)	Town	Mayor–Council	San Juan	585			1.7	4.4	344.1/sq mi (132.9/km^{2})
Lake Arthur	Town	Mayor–Council	Chaves	378	436	−13.3%	0.53	1.4	713.2/sq mi (275.4/km^{2})
Las Cruces†	City	Council–Manager §	Doña Ana	111,385	97,618	+14.1%	76.93	199.2	1,447.9/sq mi (559.0/km^{2})
Las Vegas†	City	Mayor–Council with Manager §	San Miguel	13,166	13,753	−4.3%	7.82	20.3	1,683.6/sq mi (650.1/km^{2})
Logan	Village	Mayor–Council	Quay	970	1,042	−6.9%	10.60	27.5	91.5/sq mi (35.3/km^{2})
Lordsburg†	City	Mayor–Council	Hidalgo	2,335	2,797	−16.5%	8.43	21.8	277.0/sq mi (106.9/km^{2})
Los Alamos	County	City–County (Council–Manager) §	Los Alamos	19,419	17,950	+8.2%	109.17	282.7	177.9/sq mi (68.7/km^{2})
Los Lunas†	Village	Mayor–Council	Valencia	17,242	14,835	+16.2%	18.73	48.5	920.6/sq mi (355.4/km^{2})
Los Ranchos de Albuquerque	Village	Mayor–Council	Bernalillo	5,874	6,024	−2.5%	4.45	11.5	1,320.0/sq mi (509.7/km^{2})
Loving	Village	Mayor–Council	Eddy	1,390	1,413	−1.6%	1.21	3.1	1,148.8/sq mi (443.5/km^{2})
Lovington†	City	Commission–Manager	Lea	11,668	11,009	+6.0%	11.20	29.0	1,041.8/sq mi (402.2/km^{2})
Magdalena	Village	Mayor–Council	Socorro	806	938	−14.1%	6.22	16.1	129.6/sq mi (50.0/km^{2})
Maxwell	Village	Mayor–Council	Colfax	224	254	−11.8%	0.47	1.2	476.6/sq mi (184.0/km^{2})
Melrose	Village	Mayor–Council	Curry	622	651	−4.5%	1.69	4.4	368.0/sq mi (142.1/km^{2})
Mesilla	Town	Mayor–Council	Doña Ana	1,797	2,196	−18.2%	5.68	14.7	316.4/sq mi (122.2/km^{2})
Milan	Village	Mayor–Council	Cibola	2,456	3,245	−24.3%	4.34	11.2	565.9/sq mi (218.5/km^{2})
Moriarty	City	Mayor–Council	Torrance	1,946	1,910	+1.9%	6.94	18.0	280.4/sq mi (108.3/km^{2})
Mosquero†	Village	Mayor–Council	Harding; San Miguel	98	93	+5.4%	1.00	2.6	98.0/sq mi (37.8/km^{2})
Mountainair	Town	Mayor–Council	Torrance	884	928	−4.7%	1.58	4.1	559.5/sq mi (216.0/km^{2})
Pecos	Village	Mayor–Council	San Miguel	1,392	1,392	0.0%	1.78	4.6	782.0/sq mi (301.9/km^{2})
Peralta (Note: The town incorporated on July 1, 2007, and is thus not represented in the 2010 census.)	Town	Mayor–Council	Valencia	3,342	3,660	−8.7%	4.44	11.5	752.7/sq mi (290.6/km^{2})
Portales†	City	Mayor–Council with Manager	Roosevelt	12,137	12,280	−1.2%	7.95	20.6	1,526.7/sq mi (589.4/km^{2})
Questa	Village	Mayor–Council	Taos	1,742	1,770	−1.6%	5.11	13.2	340.9/sq mi (131.6/km^{2})
Raton†	City	Commission–Manager	Colfax	6,041	6,885	−12.3%	7.96	20.6	758.9/sq mi (293.0/km^{2})
Red River	Town	Mayor–Council	Taos	542	477	+13.6%	1.02	2.6	531.4/sq mi (205.2/km^{2})
Reserve†	Village	Mayor–Council	Catron	293	289	+1.4%	0.56	1.5	523.2/sq mi (202.0/km^{2})
Rio Communities (Note: The city incorporated May 16, 2013, and is thus not represented in the 2010 census.)	City	Mayor–Council	Valencia	4,926			7.7	20=	639.7/sq mi (247.0/km^{2})
Rio Rancho	City	Mayor–Council with Manager §	Bernalillo; Sandoval	104,026	87,521	+18.9%	103.36	267.7	1,006.4/sq mi (388.6/km^{2})
Roswell†	City	Mayor–Council with Manager	Chaves	48,422	48,366	+0.1%	29.72	77.0	1,629.3/sq mi (629.1/km^{2})
Roy	Village	Mayor–Council	Harding	193	234	−17.5%	2.04	5.3	94.6/sq mi (36.5/km^{2})
Ruidoso	Village	Mayor–Council with Manager	Lincoln	7,679	8,029	−4.4%	16.13	41.8	476.1/sq mi (183.8/km^{2})
Ruidoso Downs	City	Mayor–Council	Lincoln	2,620	2,815	−6.9%	3.79	9.8	691.3/sq mi (266.9/km^{2})
San Jon	Village	Mayor–Council	Quay	195	216	−9.7%	2.93	7.6	66.6/sq mi (25.7/km^{2})
San Ysidro	Village	Mayor–Council	Sandoval	166	193	−14.0%	2.34	6.1	70.9/sq mi (27.4/km^{2})
Santa Clara	Village	Mayor–Council	Grant	1,637	1,686	−2.9%	1.99	5.2	822.6/sq mi (317.6/km^{2})
Santa Fe‡	City	Mayor–Council with Manager §	Santa Fe	87,505	67,947	+28.8%	52.23	135.3	1,675.4/sq mi (646.9/km^{2})
Santa Rosa†	City	Mayor–Council	Guadalupe	2,850	2,848	+0.1%	5.00	12.9	570.0/sq mi (220.1/km^{2})
Silver City†	Town	Mayor–Council with Manager §	Grant	9,704	10,315	−5.9%	10.12	26.2	958.9/sq mi (370.2/km^{2})
Socorro†	City	Mayor–Council	Socorro	8,707	9,051	−3.8%	14.45	37.4	602.6/sq mi (232.6/km^{2})
Springer	Town	Mayor–Council	Colfax	931	1,047	−11.1%	2.20	5.7	423.2/sq mi (163.4/km^{2})
Sunland Park	City	Mayor–Council	Doña Ana	16,702	14,106	+18.4%	13.58	35.2	1,229.9/sq mi (474.9/km^{2})
Taos†	Town	Mayor–Council with Manager	Taos	6,474	5,716	+13.3%	6.02	15.6	1,075.4/sq mi (415.2/km^{2})
Taos Ski Valley	Village	Mayor–Council	Taos	77	69	+11.6%	2.85	7.4	27.0/sq mi (10.4/km^{2})
Tatum	Town	Mayor–Council	Lea	706	798	−11.5%	1.59	4.1	444.0/sq mi (171.4/km^{2})
Texico	City	Mayor–Council	Curry	956	1,130	−15.4%	0.83	2.1	1,151.8/sq mi (444.7/km^{2})
Tijeras	Village	Mayor–Council	Bernalillo	465	541	−14.0%	1.13	2.9	411.5/sq mi (158.9/km^{2})
Truth or Consequences†	City	Commission–Manager	Sierra	6,052	6,475	−6.5%	28.00	72.5	216.1/sq mi (83.5/km^{2})
Tucumcari†	City	Commission–Manager	Quay	5,278	5,363	−1.6%	9.51	24.6	555.0/sq mi (214.3/km^{2})
Tularosa	Village	Mayor–Council	Otero	2,553	2,842	−10.2%	2.82	7.3	905.3/sq mi (349.5/km^{2})
Vaughn	Town	Mayor–Council	Guadalupe	286	446	−35.9%	5.60	14.5	51.1/sq mi (19.7/km^{2})
Virden	Village	Mayor–Council	Hidalgo	126	152	−17.1%	0.21	0.54	600.0/sq mi (231.7/km^{2})
Wagon Mound	Village	Mayor–Council	Mora	266	314	−15.3%	1.01	2.6	263.4/sq mi (101.7/km^{2})
Willard	Village	Mayor–Council	Torrance	201	253	−20.6%	0.92	2.4	218.5/sq mi (84.4/km^{2})
Williamsburg	Village	Mayor–Council	Sierra	462	449	+2.9%	0.49	1.3	942.9/sq mi (364.0/km^{2})
Total municipalities	–	–	–	1,446,366	1,347,159	+7.4%	1,275.58	3,303.7	1,133.9/sq mi (437.8/km^{2})
New Mexico	–	–	–	2,117,522	2,059,179	+2.8%	121,298.15	314,160.8	17.5/sq mi (6.7/km^{2})

== See also ==
- List of census-designated places in New Mexico
