= New Mexico State Road 480 =

State highway in New Mexico, United States

State Road 480

Route information
- Maintained by NMDOT
- Length: 13.084 mi (21.057 km)

Major junctions
- West end: NM 330 near Elida
- East end: US 70 near Portales

Location
- Country: United States
- State: New Mexico
- Counties: Roosevelt

Highway system
- New Mexico State Highway System; Interstate; US; State; Scenic
← NM 479	→ NM 483

State Road 480 (NM 480) is a 13.084-mile-long (21.057 km) state highway in the US state of New Mexico. NM 480's western terminus is at NM 330 north of Elida, and the eastern terminus is at U.S. Route 70 (US 70) southwest of Portales.

== Major intersections ==
The entire route is in Roosevelt County.

Location	mi	km	Destinations	Notes
	0.000	0.000	NM 330	Western terminus
	13.084	21.057	US 70	Eastern terminus
1.000 mi = 1.609 km; 1.000 km = 0.621 mi
