= PRZ =

PRZ may refer to:

- Power Rangers Zeo, a US superhero action television series
- Prineville Airport in Prineville, Oregon (IATA code)
- prz - the ISO 639.3 language code for a unique sign language used by Providence Island inhabitants
- Portales Municipal Airport in Portales, New Mexico (IATA location identifier)
- Air Paradise International, an airline based in Denpasar, Bali, Indonesia (ICAO airline designator)
