= New Mexico State Road 330 =

State highway in New Mexico, United States

State Road 330

Route information
- Maintained by NMDOT
- Length: 20.363 mi (32.771 km)

Major junctions
- South end: US 70 / NM 114 in Elida
- North end: NM 267 near Floyd

Location
- Country: United States
- State: New Mexico
- Counties: Roosevelt

Highway system
- New Mexico State Highway System; Interstate; US; State; Scenic
← NM 329	→ NM 331

State Road 330 (NM 330) is a 20.3-mile-long (32.7 km) state highway in the US state of New Mexico. NM 330's southern terminus is at U.S. Route 70 (US 70) and NM 114 in Elida, and the eastern terminus is at NM 267 west of Floyd.

== Major intersections ==
The entire route is in Roosevelt County.

Location	mi	km	Destinations	Notes
Elida	0.000	0.000	US 70 / NM 114 east	Southern terminus, Western terminus of NM 114
	12.400	19.956	NM 480 east	Western terminus of NM 480
	20.363	32.771	NM 267	Northern terminus
1.000 mi = 1.609 km; 1.000 km = 0.621 mi
