= Tiny Reed =

American football coach

Coaching career (HC unless noted)

Football
- 1934: Eastern New Mexico

Basketball
- 1934–1936: Eastern New Mexico

Head coaching record
- Overall: 7–0–2 (football); 31–17 (basketball)

Deward Homan "Tiny" Reed was an American college football and college basketball coach. He was the first head football coach at Eastern New Mexico Junior College—now known as Eastern New Mexico University—in Portales, New Mexico, serving for one season, in 1934, and compiling a record of 7–0–2. Reed also coached the basketball team at 7–0–2 for two seasons, from 1934 to 1936, tallying a mark of 31–17.

== Head coaching record ==
=== Football ===
Year	Team	Overall	Conference	Standing	Bowl/playoffs
Eastern New Mexico Greyhounds (Independent) (1934)
1934	Eastern New Mexico	7–0–2			
Eastern New Mexico:		7–0–2			
Total:		7–0–2			
