= New Mexico State Road 236 =

State highway in New Mexico, United States

State Road 236
- NM 236 highlighted in red

Route information
- Maintained by NMDOT
- Length: 20.581 mi (33.122 km)

Major junctions
- West end: NM 267 near Melrose
- East end: NM 267 in Portales

Location
- Country: United States
- State: New Mexico
- Counties: Roosevelt

Highway system
- New Mexico State Highway System; Interstate; US; State; Scenic
← NM 235	→ NM 237

State Road 236 (NM 236) is a 20.581-mile-long (33.122 km) state highway in the US state of New Mexico. NM 236's western terminus is at NM 267 south of Melrose, and the eastern terminus is at NM 267 in Portales.

== Major intersections ==
The entire route is in Roosevelt County.

Location	mi	km	Destinations	Notes
	0.000	0.000	NM 267 – Floyd, Melrose	Western terminus
Portales	20.581	33.122	NM 267 (Fir Street)	Eastern terminus; road continues south as Main Avenue
1.000 mi = 1.609 km; 1.000 km = 0.621 mi
