= R. P. Terrell =

American football coach

Coaching career (HC unless noted)

Football
- 1938: Eastern New Mexico

Basketball
- 1938–1939: Eastern New Mexico

Head coaching record
- Overall: 3–5–2 (football); 9–9 (basketball)

R. P. Terrell was the fourth head football coach for Eastern New Mexico University in Portales, New Mexico and he held that position for the 1938 season. His overall coaching record at Eastern NMU was 3 wins, 5 losses, and 2 ties. This ranks him 13th at Eastern NMU in terms of total wins and 11th at Eastern NMU in terms of winning percentage.

Terrell also coached the basketball team for the 1938–39 season.

== Head coaching record ==
=== Football ===
Year	Team	Overall	Conference	Standing	Bowl/playoffs
Eastern New Mexico Greyhounds (Independent) (1938)
1938	Eastern New Mexico	3–5–2			
Eastern New Mexico:		3–5–2			
Total:		3–5–2			
