= Boyd Stockman =

American actor and stuntman

- Born: Ira D. Boyd Stockman; February 12, 1916; Redrock, New Mexico, U.S.
- Died: March 10, 1998 (aged 82); Silver City, New Mexico, U.S.
- Occupations: Actor, stuntman
- Years active: 1945–1974

Ira D. Boyd Stockman (February 12, 1916 – March 10, 1998) was an American actor and stuntman. He was best known for his appearances in the American western television series The Adventures of Kit Carson, and for playing the role of Spud Oxton in the 1955 film The Man from Laramie.

Stockman was born in Redrock, New Mexico, and raised in California. His television credits include Gunsmoke, State Trooper, The Guns of Will Sonnett, The Virginian, The Range Rider, Annie Oakley, Laramie, The Gene Autry Show, Sky King, The Adventures of Wild Bill Hickok, Cimarron City and Tales of Wells Fargo. His film credits include Gun Talk, The Duel at Silver Creek, Outlaw Brand, Beyond the Purple Hills, Texans Never Cry, Westward Ho the Wagons!, Night Passage, Hidden Danger, West of El Dorado and The Gambler Wore a Gun.

Stockman died in May 1998 in Silver City, New Mexico, at the age of 82.
