= New Mexico State Road 494 =

State highway in New Mexico, United States

State Road 494
- Main Street

Route information
- Maintained by NMDOT
- Length: 1.918 mi (3.087 km)

Major junctions
- South end: Banner Mine Road in Lordsburg
- I-10 in Lordsburg
- North end: US 70 / I-10 BL in Lordsburg

Location
- Country: United States
- State: New Mexico
- Counties: Hidalgo

Highway system
- New Mexico State Highway System; Interstate; US; State; Scenic
← US 491	→ NM 498

State Road 494 (NM 494) is a 1.9-mile-long (3.1 km) state highway in the US state of New Mexico. NM 494's southern terminus is a continuation of Banner Mine Road at the southern city border of Lordsburg, and the northern terminus is at U.S. Route 70 (US 70) and Interstate 10 Business (I-10 Bus.) in Lordsburg.

== Major intersections ==
The entire route is in Lordsburg, Hidalgo County.

mi	km	Destinations	Notes
0.000	0.000	US 70 / I-10 BL	Northern terminus
0.590	0.950	I-10	I-10 exit 22
1.918	3.087	Banner Mine Road	Southern terminus, continues south as Banner Mine Road at southern city line
1.000 mi = 1.609 km; 1.000 km = 0.621 mi
