= Ute Dam =

Dam in Quay County

Coordinates: 35°20′42″N 103°26′41″W

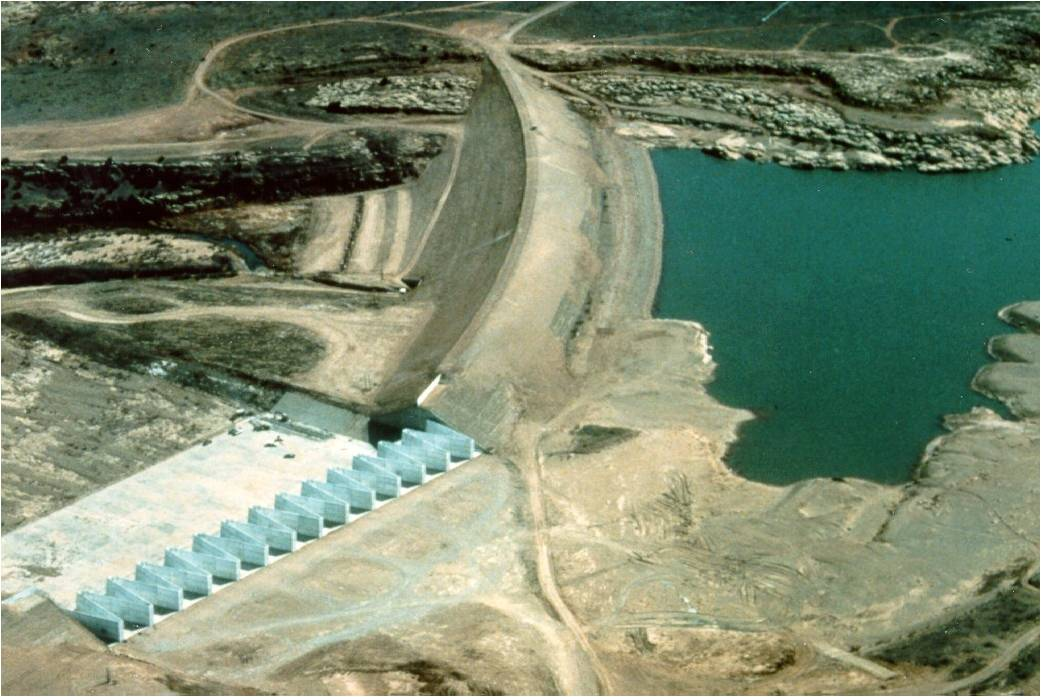
Ute Dam, with accordion spillway in foreground

Ute Dam (National ID # NM00293) is a dam at Logan, New Mexico in Quay County, about 20 miles (32 km) west of the Texas state line. The reservoir it creates, Ute Reservoir, has a water surface of 8,200 acres (3,300 ha) and has a maximum capacity of 403,000 acre-feet (497,000,000 m^{3}). Recreation includes fishing for largemouth bass, catfish, crappie and walleye, and the facilities at the adjacent Ute Lake State Park.

== History ==
The earthen dam was completed in 1963 by the New Mexico Interstate Stream Commission, without federal funding, and with a height of 132 feet (40 m) and a length of 6,530 feet (1,990 m) at its crest. It impounds the Canadian River for municipal water use. The dam is owned and operated by the Commission, which is authorized under state law to implement projects and negotiate with neighboring states on water issues. Ute Reservoir is the only large state-owned and operated reservoir in New Mexico.

Structurally the Ute Dam has the largest labyrinth weir spillway in the United States. It was a 1984 addition to the original structure, designed by the United States Bureau of Reclamation, which raised the height of the lake by 27 feet (8.2 m).

In 2023, the FW1 Ute Reservoir pipeline project started construction to provide potable water by 2030 for Cannon Air Force Base and the communities of Clovis, Portales, Elida, Texico.
