= New Mexico State Road 464 =

State highway in New Mexico, United States

State Road 464

Route information
- Maintained by NMDOT
- Length: 20.962 mi (33.735 km)

Major junctions
- Southern end: US 70 near Lordsburg
- Northern end: Conner Road in Redrock

Location
- Country: United States
- State: New Mexico
- Counties: Hidalgo, Grant

Highway system
- New Mexico State Highway System; Interstate; US; State; Scenic
← NM 463	→ NM 466

State Road 464 (NM 464) is a 21-mile-long (34 km) state highway in the US state of New Mexico. NM 464's southern terminus is at U.S. Route 70 (US 70) north-northwest of Lordsburg, and the northern terminus is a continuation as Conner Road at the end of state maintenance in Redrock.

== Major intersections ==
County	Location	mi	km	Destinations	Notes
Hidalgo		0.000	0.000	US 70	Southern terminus
Grant	Redrock	20.962	33.735	Conner Road	Northern terminus, continues north as Conner Road
1.000 mi = 1.609 km; 1.000 km = 0.621 mi
