= Portales Municipal Airport =

- IATA: none; ICAO: KPRZ; FAA LID: PRZ

Summary
- Airport type: Public
- Owner: City of Portales
- Serves: Portales, New Mexico
- Elevation AMSL: 4,078 ft (1,243 m)
- Coordinates: 34°08′44″N 103°24′37″W
- Interactive map of Portales Municipal Airport

Runways
| Direction | Length | | Surface |
| Direction | ft | m | Surface |
|---|---|---|---|
| 1/19 | 5,700 | 1,737 | Asphalt |
| 8/26 | 4,560 | 1,390 | Asphalt |

Statistics (2021)
- Aircraft operations (year ending 4/1/2021): 37,000
- Based aircraft: 31
- Source: Federal Aviation Administration

Portales Municipal Airport (ICAO: KPRZ, FAA LID: PRZ) is a city-owned, public-use airport located four nautical miles (7 km) southwest of the central business district of Portales, New Mexico, United States. According to the National Plan of Integrated Airport Systems for 2009–2013, it is classified as a general aviation airport.

Although many U.S. airports use the same three-letter location identifier for the Federal Aviation Administration (FIA) and International Air Transport Association (IATA), Portales is assigned PRZ by the FAA but has no designation from the IATA (which assigned PRZ to Prineville Airport in Oregon).

== Facilities and aircraft ==
Portales Municipal Airport covers an area of 502 acres (203 ha) at an elevation of 4,078 feet (1,243 m) above mean sea level. It has two asphalt paved runways: 1/19 is 5,700 by 60 feet (1,737 x 18 m) and 8/26 is 4,560 by 60 feet (1,390 x 18 m).

For the 12-month period ending April 1, 2021, the airport had 37,000 aircraft operations, an average of 101 per day: 92% general aviation and 8% military. At that time there were 31 aircraft based at this airport: 27 single-engine, 3 multi-engine and 1 helicopter.
