= New Mexico State Road 92 =

Highway in New Mexico

State Road 92

Route information
- Maintained by NMDOT
- Length: 11.168 mi (17.973 km)

Major junctions
- West end: Virden Highway at the Arizona–New Mexico state line
- East end: US 70 near Virden

Location
- Country: United States
- State: New Mexico
- Counties: Hidalgo

Highway system
- New Mexico State Highway System; Interstate; US; State; Scenic
← NM 91	→ NM 93

State Road 92 (NM 92) is a state highway in the US state of New Mexico. Its total length is approximately 11.2 miles (18.0 km). NM 92's western terminus is a continuation as Virden Highway at the Arizona–New Mexico state line, and the eastern terminus is at U.S. Route 70 (US 70) south of Virden.

== Major intersections ==
The entire route is in Hidalgo County.

Location	mi	km	Destinations	Notes
	0.000	0.000	Virden Highway to SR 75	Western terminus, at the Arizona/ New Mexico border
	11.168	17.973	US 70	Eastern terminus
1.000 mi = 1.609 km; 1.000 km = 0.621 mi
