= New Mexico State Road 88 =

State highway in Roosevelt County, New Mexico, United States

State Road 88

Route information
- Maintained by NMDOT
- Length: 21.486 mi (34.578 km)

Major junctions
- West end: US 70 in Portales
- East end: FM 746 at Texas border

Location
- Country: United States
- State: New Mexico
- Counties: Roosevelt

Highway system
- New Mexico State Highway System; Interstate; US; State; Scenic
← US 87	→ NM 89

State Road 88 (NM 88) is a 21.486-mile (34.578 km) state highway in Roosevelt County, New Mexico, United States, that connects U.S. Route 70 (US 70) in Portales with Farm to Market Road 746 (FM 746) at the Texas / New Mexico border.

== Major intersections ==
The entire route is in Roosevelt County.

Location	mi	km	Destinations	Notes
Portales	0.000	0.000	US 70	Western terminus
	21.486	34.578	FM 746	Eastern terminus
1.000 mi = 1.609 km; 1.000 km = 0.621 mi

== See also ==
- List of state highways in New Mexico
