= Virden, New Mexico =

- Village
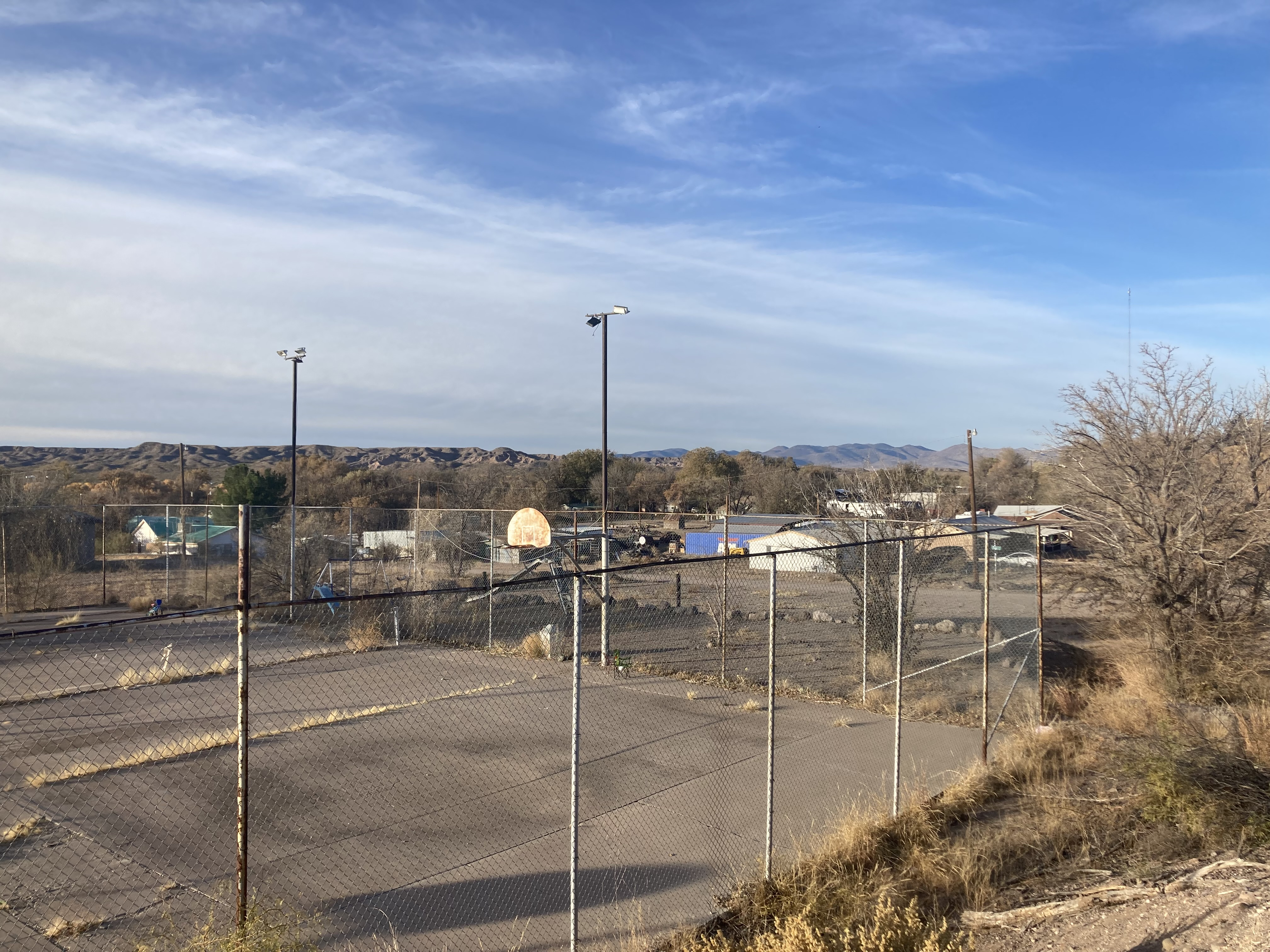

- Location of Virden, New Mexico

- Location in the United States
- Coordinates: 32°41′19″N 109°0′0″W
- Country: United States
- State: New Mexico
- County: Hidalgo

Area
  - Total: 0.21 sq mi (0.55 km^{2})
  - Land: 0.21 sq mi (0.55 km^{2})
  - Water: 0 sq mi (0.00 km^{2})
- Elevation: 3,773 ft (1,150 m)

Population (2020)
  - Total: 126
  - Density: 595.9/sq mi (230.07/km^{2})
- Time zone: UTC-7 (Mountain (MST))
  - Summer (DST): UTC-6 (MDT)
- ZIP Code: 88045
- Area code: 575
- FIPS code: 35-83200
- GNIS feature ID: 2413597
- Website: villageofvirden.com

Virden is a village in Hidalgo County, New Mexico, United States. As of the 2020 census, Virden had a population of 126.

== History ==
Known as Richmond prior to 1916, the area was originally owned by the New Mexico Mining Company, and was the location of a stamp mill for the silver ore mined in nearby Ralston. After the mine was closed, the site was sold in 1916 to Mormons who had left the Mormon Colonies in Chihuahua during the Mexican Revolution. The Mormons renamed the village after the rancher who sold them the land.

== Geography ==
Virden is located near the northern end of Hidalgo County on the north bank of the Gila River. New Mexico State Road 92 passes through the village, leading northwest 7 miles (11 km) to Duncan, Arizona, and south seven miles to its terminus at U.S. Route 70. Lordsburg, the Hidalgo County seat, is 32 miles (51 km) southeast of Virden via US 70.

According to the United States Census Bureau, Virden has a total area of 0.2 square miles (0.6 km^{2}), all land.

== Demographics ==
Historical population
| Census | Pop. | Note | %± |
|---|---|---|---|
| 1930 | 196 | | — |
| 1940 | 206 | | 5.1% |
| 1950 | 146 | | −29.1% |
| 1960 | 135 | | −7.5% |
| 1970 | 151 | | 11.9% |
| 1980 | 246 | | 62.9% |
| 1990 | 108 | | −56.1% |
| 2000 | 143 | | 32.4% |
| 2010 | 152 | | 6.3% |
| 2020 | 126 | | −17.1% |
U.S. Decennial Census

As of the census of 2000, there were 143 people, 48 households, and 38 families residing in the village. The population density was 640.1 inhabitants per square mile (247.1/km^{2}). There were 63 housing units at an average density of 282.0 per square mile (108.9/km^{2}). The racial makeup of the village was 95.10% White, 1.40% African American, 1.40% from other races, and 2.10% from two or more races. Hispanic or Latino of any race were 13.29% of the population.

There were 48 households, out of which 39.6% had children under the age of 18 living with them, 77.1% were married couples living together, 2.1% had a female householder with no husband present, and 20.8% were non-families. 20.8% of all households were made up of individuals, and 8.3% had someone living alone who was 65 years of age or older. The average household size was 2.98 and the average family size was 3.50.

In the village, the population was spread out, with 33.6% under the age of 18, 8.4% from 18 to 24, 18.2% from 25 to 44, 25.2% from 45 to 64, and 14.7% who were 65 years of age or older. The median age was 32 years. For every 100 females, there were 113.4 males. For every 100 females age 18 and over, there were 115.9 males.

The median income for a household in the village was $29,375, and the median income for a family was $46,250. Males had a median income of $33,750 versus $0 for females. The per capita income for the village was $23,184. There were 2.6% of families and 14.1% of the population living below the poverty line, including 26.1% of under eighteens and 6.7% of those over 64.
