= Prineville Airport =

Airport in Crook County, Oregon

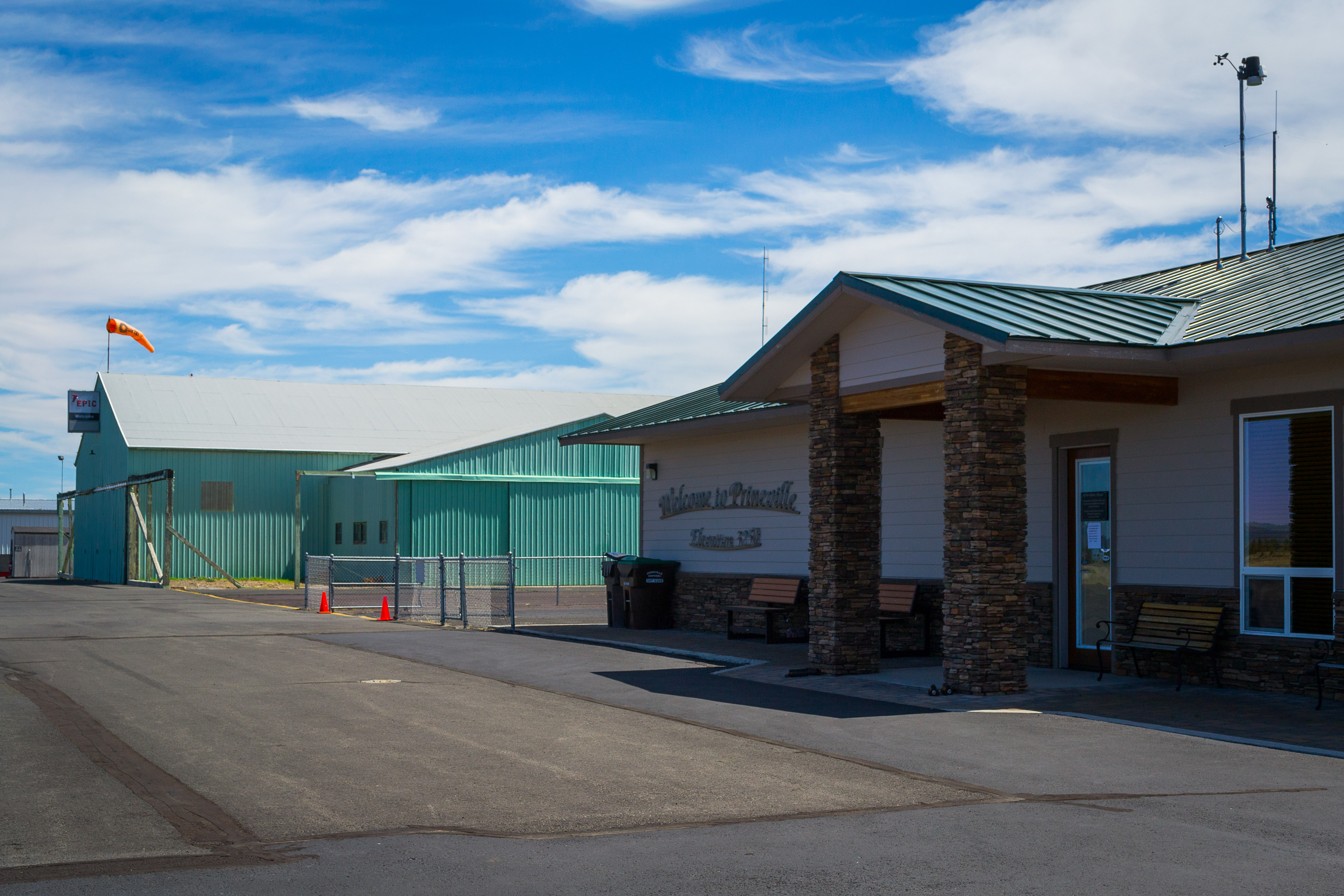
- IATA: PRZ; ICAO: none; FAA LID: S39

Summary
- Airport type: Public
- Owner: Prineville Airport Commission
- Serves: Prineville, Oregon
- Elevation AMSL: 3,251 ft / 991 m
- Coordinates: 44°17′13″N 120°54′14″W
- Interactive map of Prineville Airport

Runways
Direction	Length		Surface
Direction	ft	m	Surface
11/29	5,405	1,753	Asphalt
15/33	4,053	1,235	Asphalt

Statistics (2018)
- Aircraft operations (year ending 8/20/2018): 10,400
- Based aircraft: 116
- Source: Federal Aviation Administration

Prineville Airport (IATA: PRZ, FAA LID: S39) is a public use airport located three nautical miles (6 km) southwest of the central business district of Prineville, in Crook County, Oregon, United States. According to the FAA's National Plan of Integrated Airport Systems for 2009–2013, it is classified as a general aviation airport.

== Facilities and aircraft ==
Prineville Airport covers an area of 940 acres (380 ha) at an elevation of 3,251 feet (991 m) above mean sea level. It has two asphalt paved runways: 11/29 is 5,405 by 75 feet (1,647 x 23 m) and 15/33 is 4,053 by 40 feet (1,235 x 12 m).

For the 12-month period ending August 20, 2018, the airport had 10,400 aircraft operations, an average of 28 per day: 96% general aviation, 3% air taxi, and 1% military. At that time there were 116 aircraft based at this airport: 106 single-engine, 4 multi-engine, 2 jet, 2 helicopter, 1 glider, and 1 ultralight.
