= Texico, New Mexico =

- City
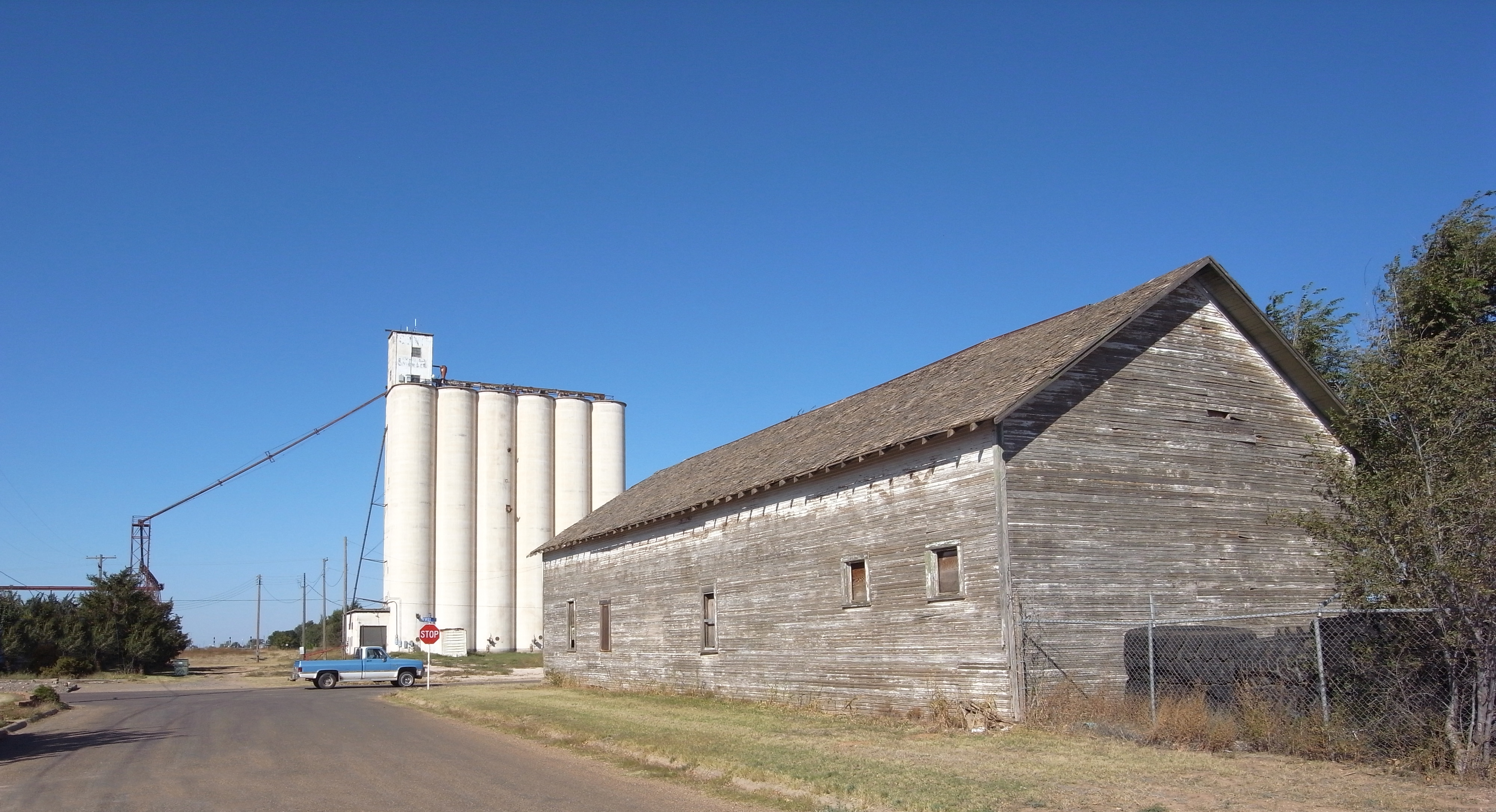
- Grain elevator in New Mexico, wooden building in Texas

- Location of Texico, New Mexico

- Location in the United States
- Coordinates: 34°23′23″N 103°03′05″W
- Country: United States
- State: New Mexico
- County: Curry

Area
  - Total: 0.83 sq mi (2.14 km^{2})
  - Land: 0.83 sq mi (2.14 km^{2})
  - Water: 0 sq mi (0.00 km^{2})
- Elevation: 4,144 ft (1,263 m)

Population (2020)
  - Total: 956
  - Density: 1,155.9/sq mi (446.31/km^{2})
- Time zone: UTC-7 (Mountain (MST))
  - Summer (DST): UTC-6 (MDT)
- ZIP code: 88135
- Area code: 575
- FIPS code: 35-77250
- GNIS feature ID: 2412057
- Website: www.texicocity.com

Texico is a city in Curry County, New Mexico, United States. As of the 2020 census, Texico had a population of 956. The city is located on the Texas-New Mexico border with the town of Farwell across the border.

== History ==
The name is a portmanteau of "Texas" and "New Mexico". Texico is located on the Texas-New Mexico border. The city of Farwell borders Texico on the Texas side of the border.

In 2023, the FW1 Ute Reservoir pipeline project started construction to provide potable water by 2030 for Cannon Air Force Base and the communities of Clovis, Portales, Elida, Texico.

== Geography ==
Texico is located on the high plains of Eastern New Mexico in a region known as the Llano Estacado. According to the United States Census Bureau, the city has a total area of 0.8 square miles (2.1 km^{2}), all land.

=== Climate ===
According to the Köppen climate classification, Texico has a semiarid climate, BSk on climate maps.

Climate data for Texico, New Mexico
Month	Jan	Feb	Mar	Apr	May	Jun	Jul	Aug	Sep	Oct	Nov	Dec	Year
Mean daily maximum °C (°F)	12 (53)	14 (57)	18 (65)	23 (73)	27 (81)	32 (90)	33 (91)	32 (89)	28 (83)	23 (74)	16 (61)	12 (53)	23 (73)
Mean daily minimum °C (°F)	−5 (23)	−3 (26)	−1 (31)	4 (39)	9 (48)	14 (57)	17 (62)	16 (60)	12 (53)	6 (43)	−1 (31)	−4 (24)	5 (41)
Average precipitation mm (inches)	10 (0.4)	10 (0.4)	20 (0.8)	20 (0.8)	51 (2)	61 (2.4)	71 (2.8)	79 (3.1)	46 (1.8)	43 (1.7)	13 (0.5)	13 (0.5)	430 (17.1)
Source: Weatherbase

== Demographics ==
Historical population
Census	Pop.	Note	%±
1910	409		—
1920	381		−6.8%
1930	569		49.3%
1940	478		−16.0%
1950	691		44.6%
1960	889		28.7%
1970	772		−13.2%
1980	958		24.1%
1990	966		0.8%
2000	1,065		10.2%
2010	1,130		6.1%
2020	956		−15.4%
U.S. Decennial Census

As of the census of 2000, 1,065 people, 381 households, and 278 families were residing in the city. The population density was 1,299 persons per square mile (502 persons/km^{2}). The 414 housing units averaged 504.9 per sq mi (194.9/km^{2}). The racial makeup of the city was 59.15% White, 4.60% African American, 1.22% Native American, 0.09% Asian, 0.09% Pacific Islander, 31.46% from other races, and 3.38% from two or more races. Hispanics or Latinos of any race were 47.32% of the population.

Of the 381 households, 37.3% had children under the age of 18 living with them, 55.4% were married couples living together, 11.8% had a female householder with no husband present, and 26.8% were not families. About 23.9% of all households were made up of individuals, and 12.3% had someone living alone who was 65 years of age or older. The average household size was 2.80, and the average family size was 3.34.

In the city, the age distribution was 30.8% under 18, 8.6% from 18 to 24, 28.1% from 25 to 44, 19.7% from 45 to 64, and 12.8% who were 65 or older. The median age was 34 years. For every 100 females, there were 97.2 males. For every 100 females aged 18 and over, there were 89.5 males.

The median income for a household in the city was $24,519, and for a family was $29,554. Males had a median income of $23,672 versus $15,250 for females. The per capita income for the city was $10,584. About 17.3% of families and 20.9% of the population were below the poverty line, including 18.8% of those under age 18 and 19.4% of those aged 65 or over.

== Education ==
Texico is within the Texico Municipal Schools school district.

== See also ==
- List of municipalities in New Mexico
- Texico, Illinois
