= Redrock, New Mexico =

Unincorporated community in New Mexico, United States

- Census-designated place
- Location within the state of New Mexico Redrock (the United States)
- Coordinates: 32°41′19″N 108°44′26″W
- Country: United States
- State: New Mexico
- County: Grant

Area
  - Total: 0.60 sq mi (1.55 km^{2})
  - Land: 0.60 sq mi (1.55 km^{2})
  - Water: 0 sq mi (0.00 km^{2})
- Elevation: 4,029 ft (1,228 m)

Population (2020)
  - Total: 3
  - Density: 5.0/sq mi (1.93/km^{2})
- Time zone: UTC-7 (Mountain (MST))
  - Summer (DST): UTC-6 (MDT)
- ZIP codes: 88055
- Area code: 575
- GNIS feature ID: 2806705

Redrock is an unincorporated community and Census-designated place located in Grant County, New Mexico, United States. The community is located on the Gila River and New Mexico State Road 464, 27.3 miles (43.9 km) west-southwest of Silver City. As of the 2020 census, Redrock had a population of 3.

== Demographics ==
Historical population
Census	Pop.	Note	%±
2020	3		—
U.S. Decennial Census

== Climate ==
Redrock has a cool semi-arid climate (Köppen BSk) with hot summers and mild winters.

Climate data for Redrock, New Mexico (1991–2020 normals, extremes 1958–present)
Month	Jan	Feb	Mar	Apr	May	Jun	Jul	Aug	Sep	Oct	Nov	Dec	Year
Record high °F (°C)	79 (26)	82 (28)	96 (36)	95 (35)	103 (39)	110 (43)	109 (43)	107 (42)	103 (39)	96 (36)	86 (30)	80 (27)	110 (43)
Mean maximum °F (°C)	68.5 (20.3)	73.8 (23.2)	81.1 (27.3)	87.1 (30.6)	95.1 (35.1)	102.2 (39.0)	102.0 (38.9)	98.4 (36.9)	95.2 (35.1)	88.6 (31.4)	78.7 (25.9)	69.3 (20.7)	103.8 (39.9)
Mean daily maximum °F (°C)	59.7 (15.4)	64.3 (17.9)	71.1 (21.7)	78.6 (25.9)	86.5 (30.3)	95.6 (35.3)	95.0 (35.0)	92.6 (33.7)	88.2 (31.2)	79.3 (26.3)	68.1 (20.1)	58.9 (14.9)	78.2 (25.7)
Daily mean °F (°C)	42.1 (5.6)	46.0 (7.8)	51.6 (10.9)	57.4 (14.1)	65.1 (18.4)	74.4 (23.6)	79.0 (26.1)	77.8 (25.4)	71.8 (22.1)	60.7 (15.9)	49.5 (9.7)	41.9 (5.5)	59.8 (15.4)
Mean daily minimum °F (°C)	24.5 (−4.2)	27.8 (−2.3)	32.1 (0.1)	36.3 (2.4)	43.8 (6.6)	53.2 (11.8)	63.1 (17.3)	62.9 (17.2)	55.4 (13.0)	42.1 (5.6)	30.9 (−0.6)	24.9 (−3.9)	41.4 (5.2)
Mean minimum °F (°C)	13.2 (−10.4)	16.8 (−8.4)	21.0 (−6.1)	26.4 (−3.1)	33.1 (0.6)	42.4 (5.8)	53.6 (12.0)	55.0 (12.8)	44.4 (6.9)	28.3 (−2.1)	18.1 (−7.7)	13.3 (−10.4)	10.5 (−11.9)
Record low °F (°C)	0 (−18)	−1 (−18)	10 (−12)	20 (−7)	24 (−4)	34 (1)	44 (7)	45 (7)	31 (−1)	13 (−11)	8 (−13)	−3 (−19)	−3 (−19)
Average precipitation inches (mm)	0.99 (25)	0.81 (21)	0.57 (14)	0.21 (5.3)	0.42 (11)	0.43 (11)	2.61 (66)	2.08 (53)	1.68 (43)	0.97 (25)	0.68 (17)	1.09 (28)	12.54 (319)
Average snowfall inches (cm)	0.5 (1.3)	0.0 (0.0)	0.0 (0.0)	0.0 (0.0)	0.0 (0.0)	0.0 (0.0)	0.0 (0.0)	0.0 (0.0)	0.0 (0.0)	0.0 (0.0)	0.0 (0.0)	0.5 (1.3)	1.0 (2.5)
Average precipitation days (≥ 0.01 inch)	5.2	5.3	3.4	1.7	2.5	3.5	10.8	10.4	7.1	4.2	3.4	5.3	62.8
Average snowy days (≥ 0.1 in)	0.3	0.0	0.0	0.0	0.0	0.0	0.0	0.0	0.0	0.0	0.0	0.3	0.6
Source: NOAA
