= Elida, New Mexico =

- Town
- Location of Elida, New Mexico

- Location in the United States
- Coordinates: 33°56′49″N 103°39′11″W
- Country: United States
- State: New Mexico
- County: Roosevelt

Area
  - Total: 1.02 sq mi (2.65 km^{2})
  - Land: 1.02 sq mi (2.65 km^{2})
  - Water: 0 sq mi (0.00 km^{2})
- Elevation: 4,364 ft (1,330 m)

Population (2020)
  - Total: 166
  - Density: 162.3/sq mi (62.68/km^{2})
- Time zone: UTC-7 (Mountain (MST))
  - Summer (DST): UTC-6 (MDT)
- ZIP codes: 88116, 88122
- Area code: 505
- FIPS code: 35-23000
- GNIS feature ID: 2412473

Elida is a town in Roosevelt County, New Mexico, United States. As of the 2020 census, Elida had a population of 166.

== History ==
In 2023, the FW1 Ute Reservoir pipeline project started construction to provide potable water by 2030 for Cannon Air Force Base and the communities of Clovis, Portales, Elida, and Texico.

== Geography ==
According to the United States Census Bureau, the town has a total area of 0.8 square miles (2.1 km^{2}), all land.

=== Climate ===
Climate data for Elida, New Mexico (1991–2020)
Month	Jan	Feb	Mar	Apr	May	Jun	Jul	Aug	Sep	Oct	Nov	Dec	Year
Mean daily maximum °F (°C)	54.3 (12.4)	59.4 (15.2)	67.7 (19.8)	76.0 (24.4)	83.7 (28.7)	92.0 (33.3)	91.8 (33.2)	90.5 (32.5)	84.3 (29.1)	75.8 (24.3)	62.3 (16.8)	54.1 (12.3)	74.3 (23.5)
Daily mean °F (°C)	39.5 (4.2)	43.6 (6.4)	51.0 (10.6)	58.4 (14.7)	67.2 (19.6)	76.1 (24.5)	77.9 (25.5)	76.5 (24.7)	69.9 (21.1)	60.0 (15.6)	47.6 (8.7)	40.0 (4.4)	59.0 (15.0)
Mean daily minimum °F (°C)	24.7 (−4.1)	27.7 (−2.4)	34.2 (1.2)	40.9 (4.9)	50.7 (10.4)	60.1 (15.6)	64.0 (17.8)	62.6 (17.0)	55.4 (13.0)	44.2 (6.8)	33.0 (0.6)	25.9 (−3.4)	43.6 (6.5)
Average precipitation inches (mm)	0.64 (16)	0.29 (7.4)	0.73 (19)	0.67 (17)	1.39 (35)	1.96 (50)	3.36 (85)	2.98 (76)	1.91 (49)	1.54 (39)	0.63 (16)	0.57 (14)	16.67 (423.4)
Average snowfall inches (cm)	3.2 (8.1)	1.4 (3.6)	1.1 (2.8)	0.2 (0.51)	0.0 (0.0)	0.0 (0.0)	0.0 (0.0)	0.0 (0.0)	0.0 (0.0)	0.6 (1.5)	1.5 (3.8)	4.6 (12)	12.6 (32.31)
Source: NOAA

== Demographics ==
Historical population
Census	Pop.	Note	%±
1910	327		—
1920	300		−8.3%
1930	325		8.3%
1940	330		1.5%
1950	430		30.3%
1960	534		24.2%
1970	233		−56.4%
1980	202		−13.3%
1990	201		−0.5%
2000	183		−9.0%
2010	197		7.7%
2020	166		−15.7%
U.S. Decennial Census

As of the census of 2000, there were 183 people, 76 households, and 50 families residing in the town. The population density was 227.9 inhabitants per square mile (88.0/km^{2}). There were 98 housing units at an average density of 122.0 per square mile (47.1/km^{2}). The racial makeup of the town was 90.71% White, 9.29% from other races. Hispanic or Latino of any race were 27.32% of the population.

There were 76 households, out of which 34.2% had children under the age of 18 living with them, 53.9% were married couples living together, 9.2% had a female householder with no husband present, and 32.9% were non-families. 30.3% of all households were made up of individuals, and 11.8% had someone living alone who was 65 years of age or older. The average household size was 2.41 and the average family size was 3.02.

In the town, the population was spread out, with 27.3% under the age of 18, 9.3% from 18 to 24, 19.1% from 25 to 44, 25.1% from 45 to 64, and 19.1% who were 65 years of age or older. The median age was 43 years. For every 100 females, there were 92.6 males. For every 100 females age 18 and over, there were 92.8 males.

The median income for a household in the town was $22,917, and the median income for a family was $25,250. Males had a median income of $21,607 versus $18,750 for females. The per capita income for the town was $11,328. About 15.6% of families and 22.7% of the population were below the poverty line, including 21.6% of those under the age of eighteen and 26.7% of those 65 or over.

== Notable people ==
- Larry Hays, Texas Tech Red Raiders baseball coach
