= Floyd, New Mexico =

- Village
- Location of Floyd, New Mexico

- Location in the United States
- Coordinates: 34°12′52″N 103°33′23″W
- Country: United States
- State: New Mexico
- County: Roosevelt

Area
  - Total: 3.08 sq mi (7.98 km^{2})
  - Land: 3.08 sq mi (7.98 km^{2})
  - Water: 0 sq mi (0.00 km^{2})
- Elevation: 4,124 ft (1,257 m)

Population (2020)
  - Total: 86
  - Density: 27.9/sq mi (10.78/km^{2})
- Time zone: UTC-7 (Mountain (MST))
  - Summer (DST): UTC-6 (MDT)
- ZIP code: 88118
- Area code: 505
- FIPS code: 35-26570
- GNIS feature ID: 2413551
- Website: villageoffloydnm.com

Floyd is a village in Roosevelt County, New Mexico, United States. As of the 2020 census, Floyd had a population of 86.

== Geography ==
According to the United States Census Bureau, the village has a total area of 3.1 square miles (8.0 km^{2}), all land.

== Demographics ==
Historical population
Census	Pop.	Note	%±
1960	423		—
1970	248		−41.4%
1980	146		−41.1%
1990	117		−19.9%
2000	78		−33.3%
2010	133		70.5%
2020	86		−35.3%
U.S. Decennial Census

As of the census of 2000, there were 78 people, 30 households, and 23 families residing in the village. The population density was 25.3 inhabitants per square mile (9.8/km^{2}). There were 33 housing units at an average density of 10.7 per square mile (4.1/km^{2}). The racial makeup of the village was 93.59% White, 5.13% from other races, and 1.28% from two or more races. Hispanic or Latino of any race were 15.38% of the population.

There were 30 households, out of which 23.3% had children under the age of 18 living with them, 70.0% were married couples living together, 6.7% had a female householder with no husband present, and 23.3% were non-families. 13.3% of all households were made up of individuals, and 10.0% had someone living alone who was 65 years of age or older. The average household size was 2.60 and the average family size was 2.87.

In the village, the population was spread out, with 23.1% under the age of 18, 11.5% from 18 to 24, 21.8% from 25 to 44, 25.6% from 45 to 64, and 17.9% who were 65 years of age or older. The median age was 43 years. For every 100 females, there were 85.7 males. For every 100 females age 18 and over, there were 81.8 males.

The median income for a household in the village was $27,083, and the median income for a family was $36,250. Males had a median income of $46,250 versus $14,375 for females. The per capita income for the village was $13,747. There were 19.2% of families and 41.8% of the population living below the poverty line, including 61.5% of under eighteens and 19.2% of those over 64.

== Climate ==
According to the Köppen Climate Classification system, Floyd has a semi-arid climate.
