= Portales, New Mexico =

- City
- Aerial view of downtown (2024)

- Flag

- Location of Portales, New Mexico

- Location in the United States Portales (the United States)
- Coordinates: 34°10′31″N 103°21′23″W
- Country: United States
- State: New Mexico
- County: Roosevelt

Area
  - Total: 8.01 sq mi (20.74 km^{2})
  - Land: 8.01 sq mi (20.74 km^{2})
  - Water: 0 sq mi (0.00 km^{2})
- Elevation: 4,013 ft (1,223 m)

Population (2020)
  - Total: 12,137
  - Density: 1,516/sq mi (585.2/km^{2})
- Time zone: UTC−07:00 (Mountain (MST))
  - Summer (DST): UTC−06:00 (MDT)
- ZIP Codes: 88123, 88130
- Area code: 575
- FIPS code: 35-59260
- GNIS feature ID: 2411469
- Website: portalesnm.gov

Portales (/pɔːrˈtælɪs/) is a city in and the county seat of Roosevelt County, New Mexico, United States. As of the 2020 census, Portales had a population of 12,137. Portales is located near the larger city of Clovis, and Cannon Air Force Base, a major contributor to the economy of the region.

Eastern New Mexico University opened in Portales in 1934 as Eastern New Mexico Junior College, and has since grown to become the third-largest university in the state. The area is one of the largest producers of Valencia peanuts in the United States and is the nation's top producer of certified organic peanut butter. Portales is home to about 40 dairies and a major US dairy solids plant, together producing and exporting hundreds of millions of dollars of local milk products each year. It is the principal city of the Portales micropolitan statistical area, which is part of the larger Clovis-Portales combined statistical area, including Clovis, 19 miles (31 km) away and Cannon Air Force Base, 13 miles (21 km) away.

== History ==
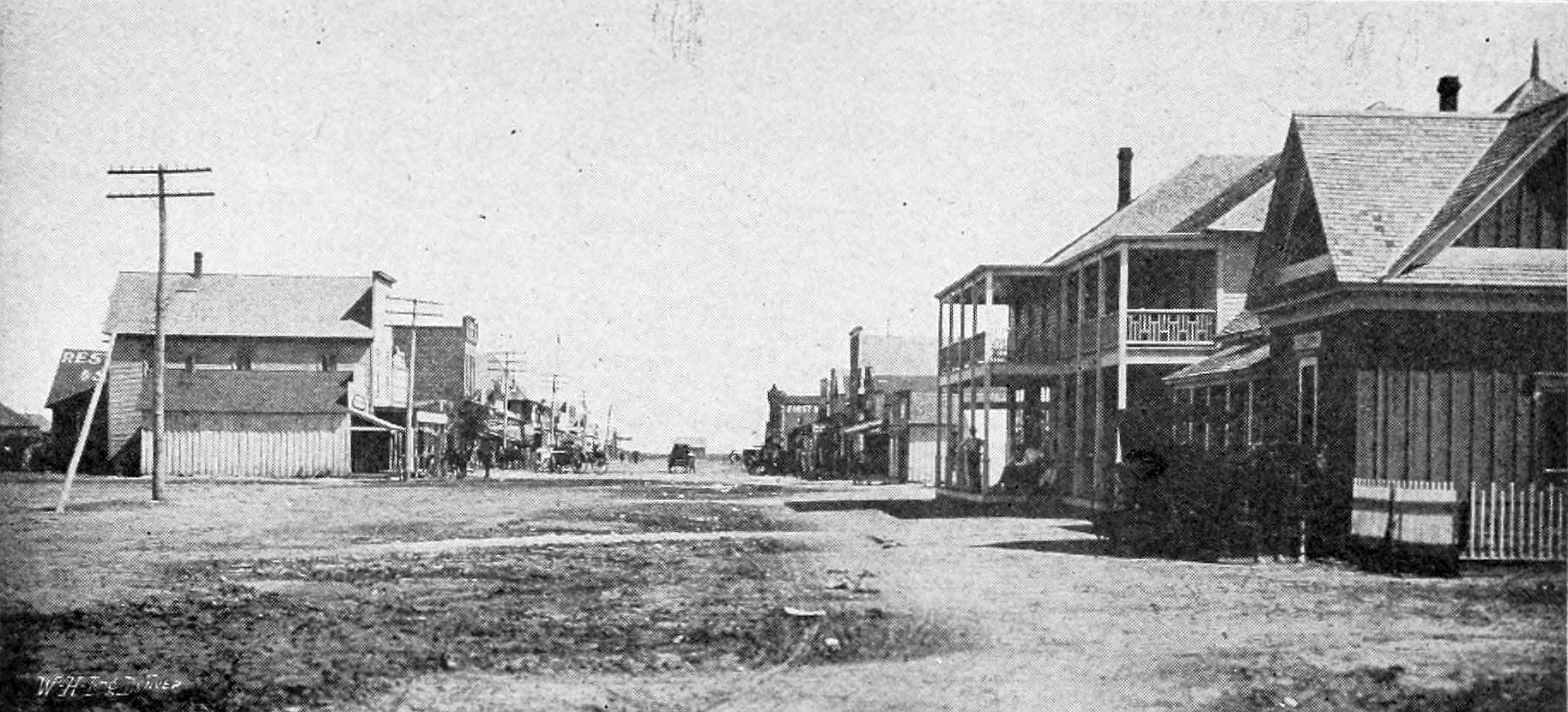
Portales, 1904

The US territorial settlement of Portales occurred in the late 19th century as cattle herders discovered a water source emanating from a rocky ledge resembling a Spanish porch. The local watering hole took on the name "Portales", and a few settlers began ranching nearby. The Pecos Valley and Northeastern Railroad arrived in 1899. The City of Portales was formally established in 1909. The first mayor of Portales was Washington Ellsworth Lindsey, who later became a governor of New Mexico.

The town developed in an orderly fashion through the early 20th century. In particular, given its access to the Ogallala Aquifer, improved surface irrigation techniques supported steady growth in agriculture.

Eastern New Mexico University was established in 1934 as a teacher's college. Originally a junior college, it became a four-year institution in the mid-20th century. The Great Depression brought several important Works Progress Administration construction projects, including the ENMU Administration Building, the downtown Portales Post Office, and the Roosevelt County Courthouse. All three buildings are listed on the National Register of Historic Places.

In 2023, the FW1 Ute Reservoir pipeline project started construction to provide potable water by 2030 for Cannon Air Force Base and the communities of Clovis, Portales, Elida, Texico.

== Geography ==
Portales is located in Eastern New Mexico. According to the United States Census Bureau, the city has a total area of 6.8 square miles (18 km^{2}), all land. The greater Portales area is about 20 square miles (52 km^{2}), completely surrounded by range and farmland.

=== Cityscape ===
The city's downtown area is centered around a traditional-style town square, based upon Spanish urban design. The center of the town square includes the 1930s WPA-style Roosevelt County Courthouse, including original architectural details from the era, as well as the adjacent 1930s post office. The Courthouse Square is ringed with retail shops. The Yam Theater, a historic theater located in the downtown area, has recently been renovated. Eastern New Mexico University (ENMU) forms a sizable district with its campus and surrounding residential stock catering largely to students. Arts and cultural offerings emanate from ENMU, the third-largest state university in New Mexico.

=== Climate ===
Portales has a semiarid climate (Köppen climate classification BSk) with hot summers featuring most of the year's rainfall from thunderstorms during the latter half of the season, plus dry winters with typically freezing mornings and mild, sunny afternoons.

Climate data for Portales, New Mexico, 1991–2020 normals, (Note: Mean monthly maxima and minima (i.e. the expected highest and lowest temperature readings at any point during the year or given month) calculated based on data at said location from 1991 to 2020.) extremes 1905–present
Month	Jan	Feb	Mar	Apr	May	Jun	Jul	Aug	Sep	Oct	Nov	Dec	Year
Record high °F (°C)	80 (27)	85 (29)	98 (37)	100 (38)	103 (39)	109 (43)	109 (43)	107 (42)	104 (40)	95 (35)	90 (32)	87 (31)	109 (43)
Mean daily maximum °F (°C)	55.0 (12.8)	60.6 (15.9)	68.7 (20.4)	76.9 (24.9)	84.8 (29.3)	92.9 (33.8)	93.3 (34.1)	91.3 (32.9)	85.2 (29.6)	75.8 (24.3)	63.4 (17.4)	54.6 (12.6)	75.2 (24.0)
Daily mean °F (°C)	40.2 (4.6)	44.6 (7.0)	51.9 (11.1)	59.7 (15.4)	68.7 (20.4)	77.6 (25.3)	79.8 (26.6)	78.1 (25.6)	71.3 (21.8)	60.4 (15.8)	48.3 (9.1)	40.3 (4.6)	60.1 (15.6)
Mean daily minimum °F (°C)	25.5 (−3.6)	28.7 (−1.8)	35.1 (1.7)	42.6 (5.9)	52.6 (11.4)	62.3 (16.8)	66.3 (19.1)	64.9 (18.3)	57.4 (14.1)	45.0 (7.2)	33.3 (0.7)	26.0 (−3.3)	45.0 (7.2)
Record low °F (°C)	−18 (−28)	−15 (−26)	−4 (−20)	11 (−12)	23 (−5)	33 (1)	50 (10)	40 (4)	29 (−2)	11 (−12)	0 (−18)	−12 (−24)	−18 (−28)
Average precipitation inches (mm)	0.50 (13)	0.37 (9.4)	0.74 (19)	0.68 (17)	1.51 (38)	2.14 (54)	2.29 (58)	2.91 (74)	1.92 (49)	1.82 (46)	0.56 (14)	0.66 (17)	16.1 (408.4)
Average snowfall inches (cm)	1.7 (4.3)	1.4 (3.6)	0.7 (1.8)	0.2 (0.51)	0.0 (0.0)	0.0 (0.0)	0.0 (0.0)	0.0 (0.0)	0.0 (0.0)	0.3 (0.76)	0.5 (1.3)	2.8 (7.1)	7.6 (19.37)
Source: NOAA

== Demographics ==
Historical population
Census	Pop.	Note	%±
1910	1,292		—
1920	1,154		−10.7%
1930	2,519		118.3%
1940	5,104		102.6%
1950	8,112		58.9%
1960	9,695		19.5%
1970	10,554		8.9%
1980	9,940		−5.8%
1990	10,690		7.5%
2000	11,131		4.1%
2010	12,280		10.3%
2020	12,137		−1.2%
U.S. Decennial Census

=== 2020 census ===
As of the 2020 census, Portales had a population of 12,137. The median age was 28.6 years. 24.1% of residents were under the age of 18 and 12.6% of residents were 65 years of age or older. For every 100 females there were 95.9 males, and for every 100 females age 18 and over there were 95.4 males age 18 and over.

98.3% of residents lived in urban areas, while 1.7% lived in rural areas.

There were 4,539 households in Portales, of which 32.3% had children under the age of 18 living in them. Of all households, 36.8% were married-couple households, 24.3% were households with a male householder and no spouse or partner present, and 31.1% were households with a female householder and no spouse or partner present. About 32.8% of all households were made up of individuals and 11.2% had someone living alone who was 65 years of age or older.

There were 5,375 housing units, of which 15.6% were vacant. The homeowner vacancy rate was 3.9% and the rental vacancy rate was 16.0%.

Racial composition as of the 2020 census
Race	Number	Percent
White	7,261	59.8%
Black or African American	429	3.5%
American Indian and Alaska Native	175	1.4%
Asian	164	1.4%
Native Hawaiian and Other Pacific Islander	18	0.1%
Some other race	2,192	18.1%
Two or more races	1,898	15.6%
Hispanic or Latino (of any race)	5,663	46.7%

=== 2000 census ===
As of the census of 2000, 11,131 people, 4,188 households, and 2,659 families were residing within the city limits of Portales.

The population density of the city of Portales in 2000 was 1,624.9 people per square mile (627.4/km^{2}). The 4,862 housing units had an average density of 709.7 per square mile (274.0/km^{2}). The racial makeup of the city was 68.80% White, 2.28% African American, 1.12% Native American, 0.96% Asian, 0.09% Pacific Islander, 23.39% from other races, and 3.35% from two or more races. Hispanics or Latinos of any race were 38.13% of the population.

Of the 4,188 households in Portales in 2000, 33.6% had children under 18 living with them, 45.3% were married couples living together, 14.2% had a female householder with no husband present, and 36.5% were not families. About 27.8% of all households were made up of individuals, and 10.0% had someone living alone who was 65 or older. The average household size was 2.49, and the average family size was 3.09.

In the city, the age distribution was 26.3% under 18, 20.1% from 18 to 24, 25.4% from 25 to 44, 15.9% from 45 to 64, and 12.2% who were 65 or older. The median age was 27 years in 2000. For every 100 females, there were 93.6 males. For every 100 females 18 and over, there were 89.8 males.

=== Income and poverty ===
The median income in 2000 for a household in the city was $24,658 and for a family was $30,462. Males had a median income of $27,080 versus $20,625 for females. The per capita income for the city was $12,935 in 2000. About 18.8% of families and 24.9% of the population were below the poverty line, including 25.5% of those under age 18 and 17.5% of those age 65 or over. By 2007, per capita income had risen significantly, while the poverty rate had dropped, in large part due to massive growth in the dairy industry. The creative class quotient for Portales was 21% in 2007.

=== Demographic estimates ===
Eastern New Mexico University had over 4,300 students and 700 faculty and staff in 2008.

== Economy ==
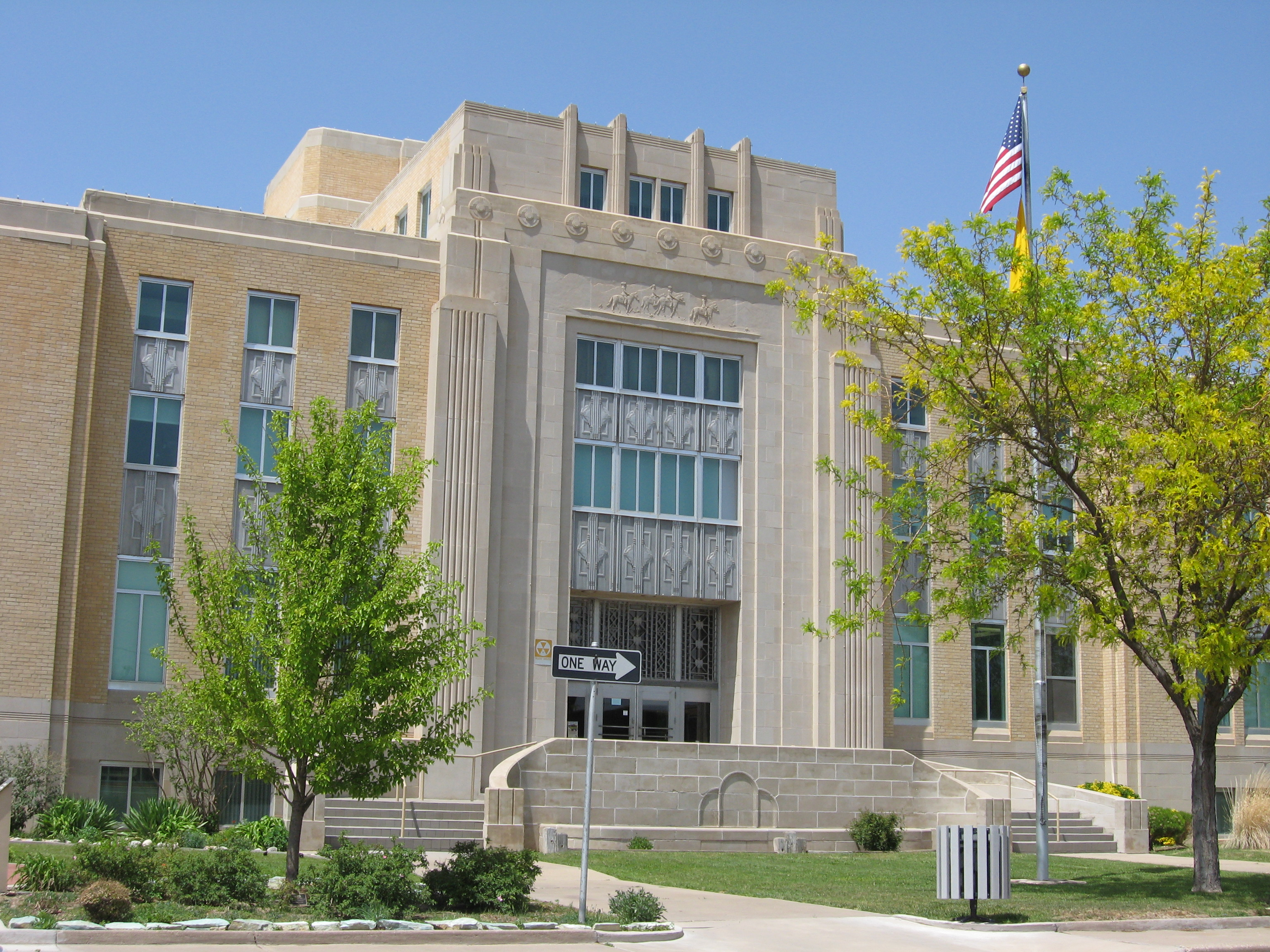
Roosevelt County Courthouse in Portales

Portales continues to be a major U.S. exporter of certified organic peanut products and a major U.S. processor and distributor of sweet Valencia peanuts.

The Portales economy is also connected to Cannon Air Force Base, located about 13 miles (21 km) to the north. The base operates a leased military-housing area in Portales with 150 single-family dwellings.

== Infrastructure ==
Highways include US 70, NM 88, and NM 206.

BNSF provides freight service.

Portales Municipal Airport, southwest of the city, is a general aviation facility.

== Notable people ==
- John Burroughs, Democratic governor of New Mexico, 1959–1961
- Ronny Cox, actor, singer, songwriter, and storyteller; starred in the film Deliverance and on the CBS series Apple's Way
- Ed Foreman, represented Texas and New Mexico in the United States House of Representatives, motivational speaker and philanthropist
- Darynda Jones, paranormal, mystery, and young-adult author
- Wayne Mass, American football player
- Cody Ross, professional baseball player
- Christopher Stasheff, fantasy author
- Ned Sublette, singer and Cuban scholar
- Jack Williamson, science-fiction author
