= Tornado outbreak of May 24–25, 1957 =

American natural disaster

Meteorological history
- Duration: May 24–25, 1957

Tornado outbreak
- Tornadoes: 45 confirmed
- Max. rating: F4 tornado
- Duration: 1 day, 19 hours, 45 minutes
- Largest hail: 2 1/2 in (6.4 cm) in Kansas on May 24 70 kn (81 mph; 130 km/h) in Missouri on May 25

Overall effects
- Casualties: 4 fatalities, 10 injuries
- Damage: $2.269 million (1957 USD) (Note: All losses are in 1957 USD unless otherwise noted.) $23.2 million (2025 USD)
- Areas affected: Central United States
- Part of the tornado outbreaks of 1957

On May 24–25, 1957, a tornado outbreak primarily affected the Western High Plains, Central Great Plains, and Central Oklahoma/Texas Plains of the United States. (Note: An outbreak is generally defined as a group of at least six tornadoes (the number sometimes varies slightly according to local climatology) with no more than a six-hour gap between individual tornadoes. An outbreak sequence, prior to (after) the start of modern records in 1950, is defined as a period of no more than two (one) consecutive days without at least one significant (F2 or stronger) tornado.) 45 tornadoes touched down over the area, most of which took place across northern and western Texas, in addition to southern Oklahoma. Overall activity initiated over eastern New Mexico and spread northeastward as far as southwestern Wisconsin. The strongest tornado, which occurred in southern Oklahoma on May 24, was assigned a rating of F4 near Lawton. (Note: The Fujita scale was devised under the aegis of scientist T. Theodore Fujita in the early 1970s. Prior to the advent of the scale in 1971, tornadoes in the United States were officially unrated. While the Fujita scale has been superseded by the Enhanced Fujita scale in the U.S. since February 1, 2007, Canada utilized the old scale until April 1, 2013; nations elsewhere, like the United Kingdom, apply other classifications such as the TORRO scale.) Anomalously, some tornadoes touched down during the early morning hours, rather than late afternoon or early evening, when daytime heating typically peaks.

== Background ==
Outbreak death toll
State	Total	County	County total
Oklahoma	4	Cotton	4
Totals	4		
All deaths were tornado-related

The week of May 20–26, 1957, was the most prolific in terms of tornado activity recorded to date. On May 20–21, an upper-level trough traversed the Central United States. As it did so, a significant tornado outbreak took place over portions of Kansas, Nebraska, Missouri, and Oklahoma. Cold upper air temperatures and marginal surface dew points produced severe weather across the southern and central Great Plains. On May 21, the vigorous shortwave trough, co-located with a deep surface low, produced a violent tornado in Minnesota, while additional tornadoes killed fifteen people in Missouri. At the time, a potent mid-level jet stream produced winds of 70 to 80 kn (81 to 92 mph; 130 to 150 km/h), providing ample wind shear for tornado-producing supercells.

On May 22, surface weather analysis indicated another low-pressure area over southwestern Oklahoma. In attendance, a series of cold fronts affected western Texas and eastern New Mexico. During their passage, outflow from thunderstorms affected the warm sector, farther to the southeast. On May 23, dew points rose across western Texas, and temperatures reached 77 °F (25 °C) in the warm sector. By 06:00 UTC (1:00 a.m. CDT/midnight MDT) on May 24, dew points of 60 to 65 °F (16 to 18 °C) surged into southeastern New Mexico on both sides of a warm front. A new surface low-pressure area also developed over New Mexico. Nine hours later, lifted index values increased to -11, coincident with surface-based convective available potential energy (CAPE) values near 3,500 J/kg. Based on observations from weather stations, the first thunderstorms developed by 16:30 UTC (11:30 a.m. CDT/10:30 a.m. MDT).

== Confirmed tornadoes ==
Confirmed tornadoes by Fujita rating
FU	F0	F1	F2	F3	F4	F5	Total
0	15	18	8	3	1	0	45
"FU" denotes unclassified but confirmed tornadoes.

- In addition to these tornadoes, there were at least three unconfirmed events. One tornado, sighted around 11:17 a.m. CST (17:17 UTC), occurred 20 mi (32 km) northwest of Wildorado, Texas, and may have developed in Deaf Smith County. It remained over rural areas and inflicted no damage. Additionally, at least one undocumented tornado was reported southeast and east of Midland around 6:30–7:15 p.m. (00:30–01:15 UTC). A brief tornado also may have touched down near Moore in the Oklahoma City metropolitan area, breaking tree branches and windows. None of these tornadoes was officially recorded in the National Weather Service database.

=== May 24 event ===
Confirmed tornadoes – Friday, May 24, 1957 (Note: All dates are based on the local time zone where the tornado touched down; however, all times are in Coordinated Universal Time and dates are split at midnight CST/CDT for consistency.) (Note: Prior to 1994, only the average widths of tornado paths were officially listed.)
F#	Location	County / Parish	State	Start coord.	Time (UTC)	Path length	Max. width	Summary
F2	WNW of St. Vrain to E of Hollene	Curry	NM	34.43°N 103.55°W	11:00–?	36.5 miles (58.7 km)	37 yards (34 m)	This long-tracked tornado family likely consisted of as many as six tornadoes, each of which generated narrow swaths of damage. It began west of Clovis and ended southeast of Bellview. Intermittent damage to farms occurred between Grier and Hollene, including the destruction of two barns.
F1	SW of Brown	Bryan	OK	34.07°N 96.50°W	16:40–?	0.1 miles (0.16 km)	10 yards (9.1 m)	A brief tornado struck twenty stanchions and mangled several boats.
F2	S of Bovina to SE of Bushland	Parmer, Deaf Smith, Potter	TX	34.43°N 102.88°W	16:45–?	70.1 miles (112.8 km)	33 yards (30 m)	This long-lived tornado family traveled northeastward to a point near Bushland, west of Amarillo. After damaging an orchard and farmland near Bovina, the tornado lifted near Hub before reforming near Friona. Near Friona and Black, the tornado damaged several homes, and destroyed structures on eight different farms. Funnel clouds in the parent storm instigated traffic accidents in Hereford that injured some people.
F0	N of Enochs	Bailey	TX	33.95°N 102.77°W	17:20–?	0.5 miles (0.80 km)	50 yards (46 m)	Rural power poles and electrical wires sustained damage.
F0	Hereford area	Deaf Smith	TX	34.82°N 102.40°W	17:30–?	1 mile (1.6 km)	10 yards (9.1 m)	This brief tornado formed over open land near Hereford and produced no damage.
F3	Sudan to Olton	Lamb	TX	34.18°N 102.85°W	18:38–18:45	1.9 miles (3.1 km)	200 yards (180 m)	This strong tornado first struck Sudan, then lifted and touched down in Olton. The tornado destroyed a total of 77 homes in and near Olton, a number of which were sited on farms outside town. The southern section of Olton received the most severe damage. The tornado lofted a vehicle 1/2 mi (0.80 km) as well. Three injuries were attributed to the tornado.
F3	ENE of Tahoka to NE of Ralls	Lynn, Lubbock, Crosby	TX	33.17°N 101.78°W	19:00–20:00	37.3 miles (60.0 km)	200 yards (180 m)	This strong, long-tracked tornado family impacted Tahoka, Wilson, Slaton, and Savage, damaging, destroying, or unroofing more than 120 structures. Two homes and two barns were also destroyed west and north of Ralls. The tornado eventually dissipated east of Cone. Tornado researcher Thomas P. Grazulis listed the total path length as being 50 mi (80 km) and classified the tornado as an F2. One injury occurred along the path.
F1	NW of Cotton Center to ENE of Hale Center	Hale	TX	34.00°N 102.00°W	19:30–?	10.5 miles (16.9 km)	10 yards (9.1 m)	One home, located north of Cotton Center, was moved 100 ft (30 m) off its foundation and torn apart. Three homes were unroofed or destroyed near the end of the path, southwest of Plainview. Nine homes also sustained minor damage. Four funnel clouds were reported nearby. Grazulis listed this tornado as an F2.
F0	N of Amarillo	Potter	TX	35.32°N 101.83°W	19:50–?	0.3 miles (0.48 km)	50 yards (46 m)	Unknown
F0	E of Edmonson	Hale	TX	34.28°N 101.88°W	20:00–?	0.5 miles (0.80 km)	10 yards (9.1 m)	Houses, barns, and trailers were destroyed near Halfway. Several livestock died as well. The tornado formed from the same storm as the Olton tornado.
F3	NNE of Lenorah	Martin	TX	32.32°N 101.87°W	20:45–?	1.5 miles (2.4 km)	83 yards (76 m)	In Lenorah, this tornado impacted five homes, one of which was destroyed. This was one of two or three tornadoes in a 30-mile-long (48 km) family. Grazulis listed this tornado as an F2. One injury occurred.
F1	NNW of Yoder	Goshen	WY	41.93°N 104.30°W	21:00–?	2.5 miles (4.0 km)	13 yards (12 m)	Numerous funnel clouds and/or tornadoes were reported, but only one touchdown was confirmed. A tornado damaged or destroyed a mobile home and outbuildings near Yoder and south of Torrington.
F1	NE of Swink	Otero	CO	38.05°N 103.58°W	21:30–?	0.1 miles (0.16 km)	10 yards (9.1 m)	A brief tornado uplifted a rural outbuilding.
F1	E of Pierce	Weld	CO	40.63°N 104.67°W	22:00–?	4 miles (6.4 km)	10 yards (9.1 m)	An empty farmhouse was destroyed, along with haystacks and machinery.
F1	N of Burlington	Kit Carson	CO	39.43°N 102.27°W	22:00–?	0.4 miles (0.64 km)	10 yards (9.1 m)	Related to the Swink event, this small tornado destroyed a chicken coop.
F1	WSW of Pierce	Weld	CO	40.63°N 104.77°W	22:00–?	0.1 miles (0.16 km)	10 yards (9.1 m)	A brief tornado destroyed a deserted farmhouse.
F1	S of Davidson to S of Frederick	Tillman	OK	34.20°N 99.07°W	22:30–?	9.7 miles (15.6 km)	10 yards (9.1 m)	Farms were extensively damaged. Utility lines and power poles were downed.
F1	WNW of Belle Plaine	Sumner	KS	37.40°N 97.30°W	23:05–?	0.1 miles (0.16 km)	10 yards (9.1 m)	A brief tornado touched down and then lifted.
F4	W of Cookietown to S of Lawton	Cotton, Comanche	OK	34.27°N 98.50°W	23:30–?	21.6 miles (34.8 km)	880 yards (800 m)	4 deaths – This large, violent tornado destroyed 12 homes, some of which were levelled. The swath of F4 damage occurred south of Lawton. One car was transported 100 yd (91 m); although the vehicle crashed in a pond, the driver was not injured. The tornado damaged or destroyed several farms as well, and numerous farm animals died in its path. Two couples died and five people sustained injuries.
F2	SSW of Wynnewood to SE of Pink	Garvin, Pottawatomie	OK	34.62°N 97.18°W	00:00–01:45	30.8 miles (49.6 km)	440 yards (400 m)	This damaging tornado family first destroyed a barn, then impacted an oil refinery in Wynnewood. Subsequently, the tornado wrecked four homes, a school, and many barns southeast of Pauls Valley. The tornado may have lifted until it encountered and destroyed frame buildings in Wanette. The tornado finally destroyed a barn northwest of Macomb before dissipating. Grazulis listed the tornado as an F3.
F2	NNW of Midland	Martin	TX	32.15°N 102.13°W	00:28–?	2 miles (3.2 km)	10 yards (9.1 m)	This brief tornado downed utility poles near State Highway 158 and reportedly destroyed farmhouses northwest of Stanton.
F1	N of Brandon	Perkins	NE	40.88°N 101.93°W	01:30–?	0.1 miles (0.16 km)	10 yards (9.1 m)	Tornado reported.
F0	NW of Cache	Comanche	OK	34.70°N 98.70°W	02:00–?	0.1 miles (0.16 km)	10 yards (9.1 m)	A tornado formed over remote, hilly country in the Wichita Mountains Wildlife Refuge.
F1	E of Goree	Baylor	TX	33.48°N 99.40°W	02:30–?	0.1 miles (0.16 km)	10 yards (9.1 m)	A tornado was witnessed southwest of Seymour.
F1	WSW of Purcell	McClain	OK	35.00°N 97.40°W	03:00–?	0.1 miles (0.16 km)	10 yards (9.1 m)	A tornado unroofed a barn, blew down trees, and damaged outbuildings on a farm.
F2	W of Marlow	Stephens	OK	34.65°N 98.00°W	03:00–?	0.1 miles (0.16 km)	10 yards (9.1 m)	A strong tornado struck the community of Denton, killed 100 turkeys, and destroyed a chicken coop, a barn, and a home. Several farms reported extensive damage, and 2-by-4-inch (51 by 102 mm) boards pierced a house as well. Additionally, a bus transporting 20 passengers was cast into a ditch, but none of the passengers was injured.
F0	Baxter Springs area	Cherokee	KS	37.02°N 94.73°W	04:00–?	0.1 miles (0.16 km)	10 yards (9.1 m)	Unknown
F1	WSW of Quapaw	Ottawa	OK	36.95°N 94.80°W	04:00–?	1 mile (1.6 km)	10 yards (9.1 m)	A tornado caused minor damage in Quapaw and destroyed a derrick at a mine east of Picher. An EF4 tornado later hit the Picher area on May 10, 2008.
F0	SE of Mulvane	Sumner	KS	37.45°N 97.22°W	04:00–?	0.1 miles (0.16 km)	10 yards (9.1 m)	Unknown
F2	SSW of Duncan	Stephens	OK	34.47°N 97.97°W	04:25–?	2.5 miles (4.0 km)	10 yards (9.1 m)	This tornado splintered trees, destroyed television antennas, and badly damaged a mobile home in Duncan. Grazulis did not list this tornado as an F2 or stronger.
F0	NE of Morris to N of Boynton	Okmulgee, Muskogee	OK	35.63°N 95.83°W	04:25–05:10	10.8 miles (17.4 km)	10 yards (9.1 m)	A tornado affected unpopulated areas near Morris and Boynton.

=== May 25 event ===
Confirmed tornadoes – Saturday, May 25, 1957
F#	Location	County / Parish	State	Start coord.	Time (UTC)	Path length	Max. width	Summary
F0	NNE of Hanna	McIntosh	OK	35.30°N 95.83°W	05:43–?	0.1 miles (0.16 km)	10 yards (9.1 m)	Highway patrol sighted a tornado southeast of Henryetta.
F0	WSW of Checotah	McIntosh	OK	35.43°N 95.60°W	05:45–?	0.1 miles (0.16 km)	10 yards (9.1 m)	A tornado was sighted, but no damage was reported.
F2	Coleman area	Johnston	OK	34.27°N 96.42°W	06:05–?	1 mile (1.6 km)	200 yards (180 m)	A new school was partly unroofed and damage was extensive to buildings and trees. Two funnel clouds were seen. Grazulis did not list this tornado as an F2 or stronger.
F1	W of Lehigh	Coal	OK	34.27°N 96.42°W	06:10–?	0.1 miles (0.16 km)	10 yards (9.1 m)	A tornado destroyed sheds and damaged a house and a barn.
F1	ESE of Steedman to SE of Atwood	Pontotoc, Hughes	OK	34.80°N 96.42°W	06:15–?	11.5 miles (18.5 km)	150 yards (140 m)	Near Allen, the tornado unroofed a home and destroyed a barn. Trees and outbuildings were prostrated near Atwood, and a number of farmsteads were damaged along the path. Grazulis listed this tornado as an F2.
F0	SW of Mountain Valley (1st tornado)	Garland	AR	34.60°N 93.10°W	12:00–?	0.1 miles (0.16 km)	10 yards (9.1 m)	Intermittent, slight damage occurred.
F0	SW of Mountain Valley (2nd tornado)	Garland	AR	34.60°N 93.10°W	12:06–?	0.1 miles (0.16 km)	10 yards (9.1 m)	See previous event.
F0	NW of Oak Trail Shores	Hood	TX	32.53°N 97.90°W	20:00–?	0.5 miles (0.80 km)	10 yards (9.1 m)	A tornado briefly struck a ranch east of Lipan.
F1	E of Maple Lake	Wright	MN	45.23°N 93.98°W	20:38–?	0.7 miles (1.1 km)	20 yards (18 m)	A short-lived tornado levelled a barn and felled a number of trees.
F1	NW of Grover	Codington	SD	44.82°N 97.28°W	20:45–?	0.1 miles (0.16 km)	10 yards (9.1 m)	Unknown
F0	S of Fredericksburg	Chickasaw	IA	42.95°N 92.20°W	21:30–?	0.1 miles (0.16 km)	10 yards (9.1 m)	A brief tornado damaged farmsteads and cropland.
F2	N of Bloomington to NE of Fennimore	Grant	WI	42.90°N 90.92°W	22:30–?	15.6 miles (25.1 km)	400 yards (370 m)	Grazulis did not list this tornado as an F2 or stronger.
F1	ENE of Lometa	Lampasas	TX	31.22°N 98.38°W	00:15–?	0.5 miles (0.80 km)	50 yards (46 m)	A carport was unroofed.
F0	SE of Stanton	Montgomery	IA	40.92°N 95.12°W	05:15–?	4.1 miles (6.6 km)	1,000 yards (910 m)	A tornado, large but weak, damaged a grandstand and farm buildings.

== See also ==
- List of North American tornadoes and tornado outbreaks
