= New Mexico State Road 278 =

State highway in New Mexico, United States

State Road 278

Route information
- Maintained by NMDOT
- Length: 33.536 mi (53.971 km)
- Existed: 1988–present

Major junctions
- South end: NM 209 near Grady
- North end: FR 4118 near Tucumcari

Location
- Country: United States
- State: New Mexico
- Counties: Quay

Highway system
- New Mexico State Highway System; Interstate; US; State; Scenic
← NM 277	→ NM 279

State Road 278 (NM 278) is a 33.536-mile-long (53.971 km) state highway in the US state of New Mexico. NM 278's southern terminus is at NM 209 west of Grady, and the northern terminus is at Frontage Road 4118 (FR 4118) and Historic US 66 east of Tucumcari.

== History ==
NM 278 was created in the 1988 renumbering and was originally a segment of NM 88. In the 1930s this section was NM 87 but was made into an extension of NM 88 to avoid confusion between NM 87 and US 87.

== Major intersections ==
The entire route is in Quay County.

Location	mi	km	Destinations	Notes
	0.000	0.000	NM 209	Southern terminus
	5.000	8.047	NM 231 east	Western terminus of NM 231
	33.536	53.971	Frontage Road 4118 to I-40	Northern terminus, access to I-40 exit 339 via FR 4118 west
1.000 mi = 1.609 km; 1.000 km = 0.621 mi
