= Bellview, New Mexico =

Unincorporated community in Curry County, New Mexico, United States

- Unincorporated community
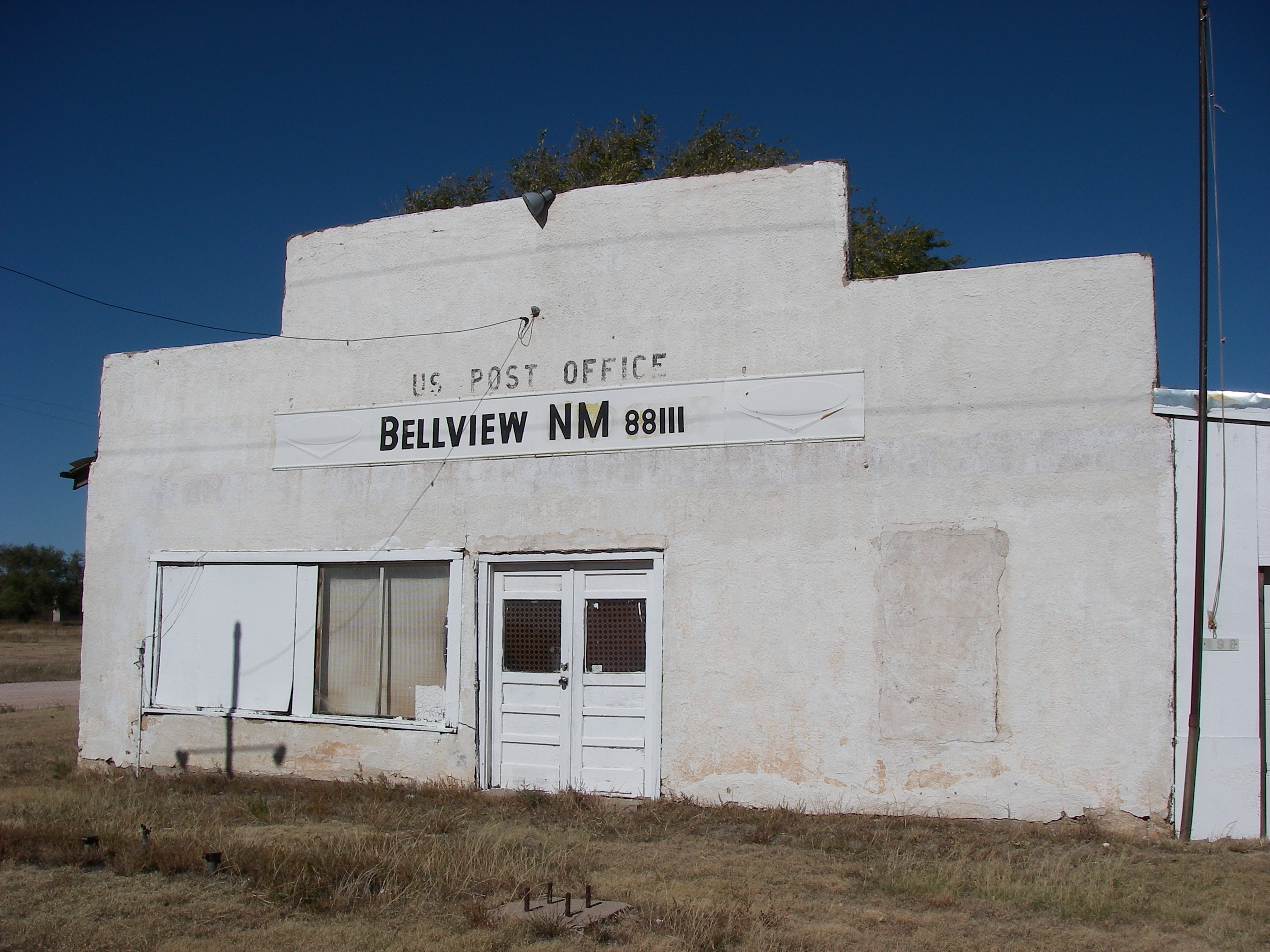
- Abandoned post office in Bellview, with the former ZIP Code for the community, November 2010

- Location within the state of New Mexico Bellview (the United States)
- Coordinates: 34°49′16″N 103°06′28″W
- Country: United States
- State: New Mexico
- County: Curry
- Elevation: 4,455 ft (1,358 m)
- Time zone: UTC-7 (Mountain (MST))
  - Summer (DST): UTC-6 (MDT)
- ZIP codes: 88112
- Area code: 575
- GNIS feature ID: 915801

Bellview is an unincorporated community located in Curry County, New Mexico, United States.

== Description ==
Bellview lies on the High Plains of the Llano Estacado at an altitude of 4,455 feet (1,358 m) above sea level. It is located 12 miles (19 km) east of Grady, 6 miles (9.7 km) east of Broadview, and 29.5 miles (47.5 km) north of Clovis. New Mexico State Road 241 runs east–west through town. Bellview had its own post office until it closed on April 22, 1995. Today, the town is mostly abandoned and approaching ghost town status.

== See also ==
- List of ghost towns in New Mexico
