= New Mexico State Road 268 =

State highway in New Mexico, United States

State Road 268

Route information
- Maintained by NMDOT
- Length: 27.718 mi (44.608 km)

Major junctions
- South end: US 60 / US 84 in Melrose
- North end: NM 209 near Ragland

Location
- Country: United States
- State: New Mexico
- Counties: Curry, Quay

Highway system
- New Mexico State Highway System; Interstate; US; State; Scenic
← NM 267	→ NM 269

State Road 268 (NM 268) is a state highway in the US state of New Mexico. Its total length is approximately 27.7 miles (44.6 km). NM 268's southern terminus is at U.S. Route 60 (US 60) and US 84 in Melrose, and the northern terminus is east of Ragland at NM 209.

== Major intersections ==
County	Location	mi	km	Destinations	Notes
Curry	Melrose	0.000	0.000	US 60 / US 84	Southern terminus
Curry		10.934	17.597	NM 89 north	Southern terminus of NM 89
Curry		14.634	23.551	NM 288 east	Western terminus of NM 288
Curry				NM 312 west	Eastern terminus of NM 312
Quay	Forrest	25.500	41.038	NM 210 north	Southern terminus of NM 210
Quay	Ragland	27.718	44.608	NM 209	Northern terminus
1.000 mi = 1.609 km; 1.000 km = 0.621 mi
