= Logan High School =

Logan High School may refer to one of several high schools in the United States:

- Logan High School (Kansas) — Logan, Kansas
- Logan High School (New Mexico) — Logan, New Mexico
- Logan High School (Utah) — Logan, Utah
- Logan High School (West Virginia) — Logan, West Virginia
- Logan High School (La Crosse, Wisconsin) — La Crosse, Wisconsin
- Benjamin Logan High School — Bellefontaine, Ohio
- Logan Correctional Center — Lincoln, Illinois
- Logan County High School — Russellville, Kentucky
- Logan Elm High School — Circleville, Ohio
- Logan High School (Ohio) — Logan, Ohio
- Logan South Campus School — Logan, Utah
- James Logan High School - Union City, California
