= New Mexico State Road 93 =

State highway in New Mexico, United States

State Road 93
- NM 93 highlighted in red

Route information
- Maintained by NMDOT
- Length: 16.448 mi (26.470 km)

Major junctions
- South end: CR E at the Quay–Curry county line
- North end: I-40 / NM 392 near Endee

Location
- Country: United States
- State: New Mexico
- Counties: Quay

Highway system
- New Mexico State Highway System; Interstate; US; State; Scenic
← NM 92	→ NM 94

State Road 93 (NM 93) is a state highway in the US state of New Mexico. Its total length is approximately 16.5 miles (26.6 km). NM 93's southern terminus is a continuation of Curry County Road E at the Quay–Curry county line, and the northern terminus is at Interstate 40 (I-40) where it continues north as NM 392 north of Endee.

== Major intersections ==
The entire route is in Quay County.

Location	mi	km	Destinations	Notes
	0.000	0.000	I-40 west / NM 392	Northern terminus, I-40 exit 369, Eastern terminus of NM 392
Endee	3.148	5.066	Historic US 66 west	Northern end of concurrency
Endee	3.248	5.227	Historic US 66 east	Southern end of concurrency
	16.448	26.470	CR E	Southern terminus at the Quay–Curry county line
1.000 mi = 1.609 km; 1.000 km = 0.621 mi: Concurrency terminus
