= List of school districts in New Mexico =

This is a complete list of school districts in the State of New Mexico.

All school districts are classified as separate governments by the U.S. Census Bureau. New Mexico has no school systems dependent on another layer of government.

== Bernalillo County ==
- Albuquerque Public Schools
- Moriarty Municipal Schools
- Rio Rancho Public Schools

== Catron County ==
- Quemado Independent Schools
- Reserve Independent Schools

== Chaves County ==
- Dexter Consolidated Schools
- Hagerman Municipal Schools
- Lake Arthur Municipal Schools
- Roswell Independent Schools

== Cibola County ==
- Grants-Cibola County Schools
- Quemado Independent Schools
- Zuni Public School District

Due to an agreement between Cibola County and McKinley County, residents of the Ramah Navajo Indian Reservation are bussed to schools in Ramah in McKinley County (including Ramah Middle/High School), of Gallup-McKinley County Schools, even though the students are physically in Cibola County. This is due to the long distance of the nearest Cibola County schools away from the reservation.

== Colfax County ==
- Cimarron Public Schools
- Des Moines Municipal Schools
- Maxwell Municipal Schools
- Raton Public Schools
- Springer Municipal Schools

== Curry County ==
- Clovis Municipal Schools
- Grady Municipal Schools
- Melrose Public Schools
- Texico Municipal Schools

== Doña Ana County ==
- Gadsden Independent Schools
- Hatch Valley Public Schools
- Las Cruces Public Schools

== Eddy County ==
- Artesia Public Schools
- Carlsbad Municipal Schools
- Loving Municipal Schools

== Grant County ==
- Cobre Consolidated Schools
- Silver Consolidated Schools

== Guadalupe County ==
- Santa Rosa Consolidated Schools
- Vaughn Municipal Schools

== Harding County ==
- Mosquero Municipal Schools
- Roy Municipal Schools

== Hidalgo County ==
- Animas Public Schools
- Lordsburg Municipal Schools

== Lea County ==
- Eunice Public Schools
- Hobbs Municipal Schools
- Jal Public Schools
- Lovington Public Schools
- Tatum Municipal Schools

== Lincoln County ==
- Capitan Municipal Schools
- Carrizozo Municipal Schools
- Corona Public Schools
- Hondo Valley Public Schools
- Ruidoso Municipal Schools

== McKinley County ==
- Gallup-McKinley County Schools
- Zuni Public Schools

== Mora County ==
- Mora Independent Schools
- Wagon Mound Public Schools

== Otero County ==
- Alamogordo Public Schools
- Cloudcroft Municipal Schools
- Gadsden Independent Schools
- Tularosa Municipal Schools

While the southeast portion of the county is in the Alamogordo district, that district contracts education of residents there to the Dell City Independent School District of Dell City, Texas, due to the distances involved, as the mileage to Alamogordo from the former Cienega School was 100 miles (160 km) while the distance to Dell City is 20 miles (32 km).

== Quay County ==
- Grady Municipal Schools
- House Municipal Schools
- Logan Municipal Schools
- Melrose Municipal Schools
- San Jon Municipal Schools
- Tucumcari Public Schools

== Rio Arriba County ==
- Chama Valley Schools
- Dulce Independent Schools
- Espanola Public Schools
- Jemez Mountain Public Schools
- Mesa Vista Consolidated Schools

== Roosevelt County ==
- Dora Consolidated Schools
- Elida Municipal Schools
- Floyd Municipal Schools
- House Municipal Schools
- Melrose Public Schools
- Portales Municipal Schools
- Texico Municipal Schools

== Sandoval County ==
- Albuquerque Public Schools
- Bernalillo Public Schools
- Cuba Independent Schools
- Jemez Valley Public Schools
- Los Alamos Public Schools
- Rio Rancho Public Schools

== San Juan County ==
- Aztec Municipal Schools
- Bloomfield Schools
- Central Consolidated Schools
- Farmington Municipal Schools

== San Miguel County ==
- Las Vegas City Public Schools
- Pecos Independent Schools
- Santa Rosa Consolidated Schools
- West Las Vegas Public Schools

== Santa Fe County ==
- Española Public Schools
- Moriarty Municipal Schools
- Pojoaque Valley Public Schools
- Santa Fe Public Schools

== Socorro County ==
- Belen Consolidated Schools
- Carrizozo Municipal Schools
- Corona Municipal Schools
- Magdalena Municipal Schools
- Mountainair Public Schools
- Socorro Consolidated Schools

== Taos County ==
- Mesa Vista Consolidated Schools
- Peñasco Independent Schools
- Questa Independent Schools
- Taos Municipal Schools

== Torrance County ==
- Corona Municipal Schools
- Estancia Municipal Schools
- Moriarty Municipal Schools
- Mountainair Public Schools
- Vaughn Municipal Schools

== Union County ==
- Clayton Municipal Schools
- Des Moines Municipal Schools

== Valencia County ==
- Belen Consolidated Schools
- Los Lunas Public Schools

== Single-District Counties ==
- Deming Public Schools (Luna County)
- Fort Sumner Municipal Schools (De Baca County)
- Los Alamos Public Schools (Los Alamos County, also covers a part of Sandoval County)
- Truth or Consequences Municipal Schools (Sierra County)
