= New Mexico State Road 312 =

State highway in New Mexico, United States

State Road 312

Route information
- Maintained by NMDOT
- Length: 8.112 mi (13.055 km)

Major junctions
- Western end: NM 252 in McAlister
- Eastern end: NM 268 near Forrest

Location
- Country: United States
- State: New Mexico
- Counties: Curry, Quay

Highway system
- New Mexico State Highway System; Interstate; US; State; Scenic
← NM 311	→ NM 313

State Road 312 (NM 312) is a 8.112-mile-long (13.055 km) state highway in the US state of New Mexico. NM 312's western terminus is at NM 252 in McAlister, and the eastern terminus is at NM 268 south of Forrest.

== Major intersections ==
County	Location	mi	km	Destinations	Notes
Quay	McAlister	0.000	0.000	NM 252	Western terminus
Curry		8.112	13.055	NM 268	Eastern terminus
1.000 mi = 1.609 km; 1.000 km = 0.621 mi
