= Ute Lake State Park =

State park in New Mexico, US

- Location within New Mexico
- Location: Quay County, New Mexico, United States
- Coordinates: 35°21′36″N 103°27′05″W
- Area: 1,500 acres (610 ha)
- Elevation: 3,762 ft (1,147 m)
- Established: 1964
- Administrator: New Mexico State Parks Division
- Website: Official website

Ute Lake State Park is a state park in New Mexico, United States, located on the eastern plains. The park features a large 8,200-acre (33 km^{2}) reservoir on the Canadian River that is home to various fish species including largemouth bass, catfish, crappie and walleye. The state-owned Ute Dam creating the reservoir was completed in 1963 without federal funding. The park elevation is 3,762 feet (1,147 m) above sea level. The park is located 2 miles (3.2 km) west of the town of Logan, New Mexico, and is accessed by New Mexico State Road 540.
