= Grady High School =

Grady High School may refer to:

- Grady High School (Arkansas) (closed) — Grady, Arkansas, Grady School District
- Henry W. Grady High School — Atlanta, Georgia
- Grady High School (New Mexico) — Grady, New Mexico
- H. Grady Spruce High School — Dallas, Texas
- Grady High School — Lenorah, Texas, Grady Independent School District
- William E. Grady High School — New York City, New York
