= New Mexico State Road 289 =

Highway in New Mexico

State Road 289

Route information
- Maintained by NMDOT
- Length: 1.833 mi (2.950 km)

Major junctions
- Southern end: NM 288 near Broadview
- Northern end: NM 209 near Clovis

Location
- Country: United States
- State: New Mexico
- Counties: Curry

Highway system
- New Mexico State Highway System; Interstate; US; State; Scenic
← NM 288	→ NM 290

State Road 289 (NM 289) is a 1.833-mile-long (2.950 km) state highway in the US state of New Mexico. NM 289's southern terminus is at NM 288 north of Clovis, and the northern terminus is at NM 209 south of Broadview.

== Major intersections ==
The entire route is in Curry County.

Location	mi	km	Destinations	Notes
	0.000	0.000	NM 288	Southern terminus
	1.833	2.950	NM 209	Northern terminus
1.000 mi = 1.609 km; 1.000 km = 0.621 mi
