= New Mexico State Road 19 =

Highway in New Mexico

State Road 19

Route information
- Maintained by NMDOT
- Length: 10.257 mi (16.507 km)

Major junctions
- West end: NM 209 north of Clovis
- East end: FM 2013

Location
- Country: United States
- State: New Mexico
- Counties: Curry

Highway system
- New Mexico State Highway System; Interstate; US; State; Scenic
← NM 18	→ NM 20

State Road 19 (NM 19) is a state highway in the US state of New Mexico. Its total length is approximately 10.2 miles (16.4 km). NM 19's western terminus is at NM 209 in Clovis, and the eastern terminus is at FM 2013.

== History ==
Before 1940 it was originally part of NM 2 then later U.S. Route 285 (US 285). It was renamed NM 19 in 1940 when US 285 was rerouted through Tres Piedras. Then in the 1950s it was renamed NM 17 to match Colorado State Highway 17 (SH 17).

State Road 40
- Location: Broadview to Hollene
- Existed: 1950s–1970

State Road 40 (NM 40) was first established in the 1920s as a road from Weed eastward to Dunken. This was removed from the state highway system in the 1930s. This road still exists as forest roads.

Later in the 1950s, NM 40 was used for a highway from Broadview eastward to Hollene. In 1970 NM 40 was renumbered as NM 19 around 1970 to avoid confusion with Interstate 40 (I-40).

== Major intersections ==
The entire route is in Curry County.

Location	mi	km	Destinations	Notes
Clovis	0.000	0.000	NM 209	Western terminus
	9.500	15.289	NM 108 south	Northern terminus of NM 108
	10.257	16.507	FM 2013	Eastern terminus
1.000 mi = 1.609 km; 1.000 km = 0.621 mi
