= Grady Schools =

Grady Schools may refer to:

- Grady Municipal School District (New Mexico)
- Grady Independent School District (Texas)
- Grady Public Schools (Arkansas, defunct)
