= New Mexico State Road 231 =

State highway in New Mexico, United States

State Road 231

Route information
- Maintained by NMDOT
- Length: 4.995 mi (8.039 km)

Major junctions
- West end: NM 278 near Tucumcari
- East end: NM 469 near Grady

Location
- Country: United States
- State: New Mexico
- Counties: Quay

Highway system
- New Mexico State Highway System; Interstate; US; State; Scenic
← NM 230	→ NM 232

State Road 231 (NM 231) is a 4.995-mile-long (8.039 km) state highway in the US state of New Mexico. NM 231's western terminus is at NM 278 southeast of Tucumcari, and the eastern terminus is at NM 469 north of Grady.

== Major intersections ==
The entire route is in Quay County.

Location	mi	km	Destinations	Notes
	0.000	0.000	NM 278	Western terminus
	4.995	8.039	NM 469	Eastern terminus
1.000 mi = 1.609 km; 1.000 km = 0.621 mi
