= New Mexico State Road 392 =

State highway in New Mexico, United States

State Road 392

Route information
- Maintained by NMDOT
- Length: 15.878 mi (25.553 km)

Major junctions
- West end: NM 469 near Porter
- East end: I-40 / NM 93 near Endee

Location
- Country: United States
- State: New Mexico
- Counties: Quay

Highway system
- New Mexico State Highway System; Interstate; US; State; Scenic
← NM 390	→ NM 394

State Road 392 (NM 392) is a 15.878-mile-long (25.553 km) state highway in the US state of New Mexico. NM 392's western terminus is at NM 469 west of Porter, and the eastern terminus is at Interstate 40 (I-40) and NM 93 north of Endee.

== Major intersections ==
The entire route is in Quay County.

Location	mi	km	Destinations	Notes
	0.000	0.000	NM 93 south	Continuation beyond I-40 as NM 93; northern terminus of NM 93
	0.000	0.000	I-40	Eastern terminus; I-40 exit 369
	15.878	25.553	NM 469	Western terminus
1.000 mi = 1.609 km; 1.000 km = 0.621 mi
