= New Mexico State Road 275 =

State highway in New Mexico, United States

State Road 275

Route information
- Maintained by NMDOT
- Length: 14.938 mi (24.040 km)

Major junctions
- Southern end: NM 209 in Broadview
- Northern end: NM 469 near Wheatland

Location
- Country: United States
- State: New Mexico
- Counties: Curry, Quay

Highway system
- New Mexico State Highway System; Interstate; US; State; Scenic
← NM 273	→ NM 276

State Road 275 (NM 275) is a 14.938-mile-long (24.040 km) state highway in the US state of New Mexico. NM 275's southern terminus is at NM 209 in Broadview, and the northern terminus is at NM 469 north of Wheatland.

== Major intersections ==
County	Location	mi	km	Destinations	Notes
Curry	Broadview	0.000	0.000	NM 209	Southern terminus
Curry	Broadview	0.165	0.266	NM 241	
Quay		14.938	24.040	NM 469	Northern terminus
1.000 mi = 1.609 km; 1.000 km = 0.621 mi
