= New Mexico State Road 89 =

State highway in New Mexico, United States

State Road 89

Route information
- Maintained by NMDOT
- Length: 19.788 mi (31.846 km)

Major junctions
- South end: NM 268 near Melrose
- North end: NM 252 in House

Location
- Country: United States
- State: New Mexico
- Counties: Quay, Roosevelt, Curry

Highway system
- New Mexico State Highway System; Interstate; US; State; Scenic
← NM 88	→ NM 90

State Road 89 (NM 89) is a state highway in the US state of New Mexico. Its total length is approximately 19.8 miles (31.9 km). NM 89's southern terminus is north of Melrose at NM 268, and the northern terminus is at NM 252 in House.

== Major intersections ==
County	Location	mi	km	Destinations	Notes
Quay	House	0.000	0.000	NM 252	Northern terminus
Roosevelt	No major junctions				
Curry	Melrose	19.788	31.846	NM 268	Southern terminus
1.000 mi = 1.609 km; 1.000 km = 0.621 mi
