= Quay, New Mexico =

Unincorporated community in New Mexico, United States

- Unincorporated community
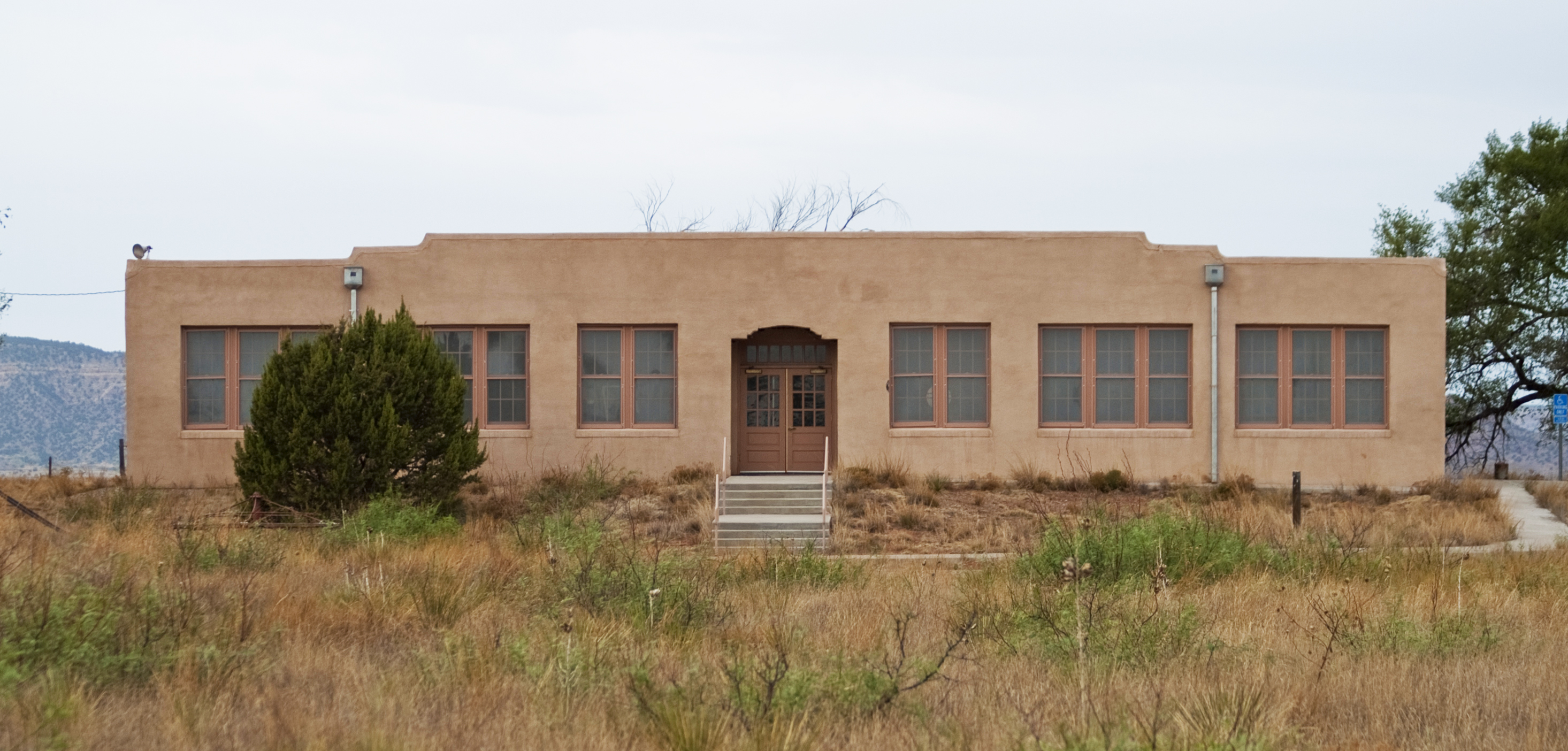
- Former Quay School

- Location within New Mexico
- Coordinates: 34°56′02″N 103°45′38″W
- Country: United States
- State: New Mexico
- County: Quay
- Region: Llano Estacado
- Established: 1904
- Elevation: 4,285 ft (1,306 m)
- Time zone: UTC-7 (MST)
- ZIP code: 88433
- Area code: 575
- GNIS feature ID: 899861

Quay is an unincorporated community in Quay County, New Mexico, United States It is located approximately 15 miles (24 km) south of Tucumcari on New Mexico State Road 209.

== History ==
Settlement of the community of Quay began circa 1902. In 1904, the community received its official name following the establishment of its post office. The name "Quay" honors Matthew S. Quay, a Civil War veteran who became a U.S. Senator from Pennsylvania in 1887. While in office, Quay became a proponent of statehood for the Territory of New Mexico and was appreciated throughout the state for his efforts. New Mexico was admitted as the 47th state in the Union on January 6, 1912. Sometime before 1926, the settlement was moved 1.5 miles (2.4 km) to the northwest to its present location near the newly constructed New Mexico State Highway 209, which stretches through the broad valley known as Quay Valley.

== Climate ==
Climate data for Quay, New Mexico
Month	Jan	Feb	Mar	Apr	May	Jun	Jul	Aug	Sep	Oct	Nov	Dec	Year
Mean daily maximum °F (°C)	49.5 (9.7)	54.4 (12.4)	62.2 (16.8)	71.4 (21.9)	79.8 (26.6)	88.2 (31.2)	89.8 (32.1)	87.3 (30.7)	80.7 (27.1)	71.4 (21.9)	58.6 (14.8)	49.9 (9.9)	70.3 (21.3)
Mean daily minimum °F (°C)	22.1 (−5.5)	25.2 (−3.8)	30.4 (−0.9)	38.4 (3.6)	47.4 (8.6)	56.3 (13.5)	60.7 (15.9)	59.5 (15.3)	52.5 (11.4)	41.7 (5.4)	31.1 (−0.5)	23.2 (−4.9)	40.7 (4.8)
Average precipitation inches (mm)	0.5 (13)	0.5 (13)	0.8 (20)	1.0 (25)	1.9 (48)	2.1 (53)	3.1 (79)	3.1 (79)	2.1 (53)	1.4 (36)	0.7 (18)	0.6 (15)	17.6 (450)
Source: Weatherbase

== See also ==
- Eastern New Mexico
- Llano Estacado
- Caprock Escarpment
- Tucumcari Mountain
- Lucianosaurus
