= New Mexico State Road 209 =

State highway in New Mexico, United States

State Road 209

Route information
- Maintained by NMDOT
- Length: 82.997 mi (133.571 km)

Major junctions
- South end: US 60 / US 70 / US 84 in Clovis
- NM 77 in Clovis; NM 469 in Grady; I-40 in Tucumcari
- North end: I-40 BL / NM 104 in Tucumcari

Location
- Country: United States
- State: New Mexico
- Counties: Curry, Quay

Highway system
- New Mexico State Highway System; Interstate; US; State; Scenic
← NM 208	→ NM 210

State Road 209 (NM 209) is a state highway in the US state of New Mexico. Its total length is approximately 83 miles (134 km). NM 209's southern terminus is at US 60/US 70/US 84 in Clovis, and the northern terminus is at I-40 Bus./NM 104 in Tucumcari.

== History ==
The beginning part of NM 209 from the junction with US 60, US 70, and US 84 north to 21st Street (Old NM 523) was transferred to the City of Clovis in a road exchange agreement.

== Major intersections ==
County	Location	mi	km	Destinations	Notes
Curry	Clovis			US 60 / US 70 / US 84	Southern terminus; highway continues as US 70 west (Prince Street south)
Curry	Clovis	0.000	0.000	To NM 523 east / 21st Street	Beginning of State maintenance
Curry	Clovis	0.806	1.297	NM 245 west	Eastern terminus of NM 245
Curry	Clovis	3.040	4.892	NM 77 east	Western terminus of NM 77
Curry		12.064	19.415	NM 288 west	Eastern terminus of NM 288
Curry		14.864	23.921	NM 289 south	Northern terminus of NM 289
Curry		23.349	37.577	NM 19 east	Western terminus of NM 19
Curry	Broadview	28.972	46.626	NM 275 north	Southern terminus of NM 275
Curry	Broadview	29.137	46.891	NM 241 east	Western terminus of NM 241
Curry	Grady	35.349	56.889	NM 469 north	Southern terminus of NM 469
Quay		42.349	68.154	NM 278 north	Southern terminus of NM 278
Quay		51.817	83.391	NM 210 south	Northern terminus of NM 210
Quay		53.817	86.610	NM 268 south	Northern terminus of NM 268
Quay	Ragland	60.102	96.725	NM 252 south	Northern terminus of NM 252
Quay	Tucumcari	81.365	130.944	I-40	I-40 exit 332
Quay	Tucumcari	82.997	133.571	I-40 BL to I-40; NM 104 west (First Street north)	Northern terminus; eastern terminus of NM 104; highway continues west as NM 104 (First St. north)
1.000 mi = 1.609 km; 1.000 km = 0.621 mi: Route transition
