= New Mexico State Road 279 =

State highway in New Mexico, United States

State Road 279

Route information
- Maintained by NMDOT
- Length: 11.6 mi (18.7 km)

Major junctions
- South end: NM 124 in Laguna
- North end: CR 5 near Seboyeta

Location
- Country: United States
- State: New Mexico
- Counties: Cibola

Highway system
- New Mexico State Highway System; Interstate; US; State; Scenic
| ← NM 278 | → NM 280 |

State Road 279 (NM 279) is a 11.6-mile-long (18.7 km) state highway in the US state of New Mexico. NM 279's southern terminus is at NM 124 in Laguna, and the northern terminus is at the end of state maintenance at County Route 5 (CR 5) south of Seboyeta.

== Major intersections ==
The entire route is in Cibola County.

| Location | mi | km | Destinations | Notes |
|---|---|---|---|---|
| Laguna | 0.000 | 0.000 | NM 124 | Southern terminus |
| | 11.600 | 18.668 | CR 5 | Northern terminus, end of state maintenance at CR 5 |
1.000 mi = 1.609 km; 1.000 km = 0.621 mi
