= New Mexico State Road 108 =

State highway in New Mexico, United States

State Road 108

Route information
- Maintained by NMDOT
- Length: 23.380 mi (37.626 km)

Major junctions
- South end: US 60 / US 70 / US 84 in Texico
- NM 77
- North end: NM 19

Location
- Country: United States
- State: New Mexico
- Counties: Curry

Highway system
- New Mexico State Highway System; Interstate; US; State; Scenic
← NM 107	→ NM 109

State Road 108 (NM 108) is a state highway in the US state of New Mexico. Its total length is approximately 23.4 miles (37.7 km). NM 108's southern terminus is at U.S. Route 60 (US 60), US 70 and US 84 in Texico, and the northern terminus is at NM 19.

== Major intersections ==
The entire route is in Curry County.

Location	mi	km	Destinations	Notes
Texico	0.000	0.000	US 60 / US 70 / US 84	Southern terminus
	2.150	3.460	NM 523 west	Eastern terminus of NM 523
	9.183	14.779	NM 77	
	23.380	37.626	NM 19	Northern terminus
1.000 mi = 1.609 km; 1.000 km = 0.621 mi
