= Grady High School (New Mexico) =

Public school in Grady, New Mexico

Location
- Coordinates: 34°49′22″N 103°19′07″W

Information
- School type: Public
- Years offered: 9–12
- Enrollment: 45
- Mascot: Mustangs
- Website: https://www.gradyschool.com/

Grady High School is a public high school located in Grady, New Mexico. Serving the village and surrounding areas, the school has an enrollment of 45 students.

== History ==
Grady High School uses a four-day school week, the same as the rest of the school district.

== Athletics ==
Grady High School participates in 1A Volleyball, as well as six-man football. They made the final in 2024, losing in the final to Logan High School 54–14. The 2025 final was a rematch, where Grady narrowly lost 32–31.

== Enrollment ==
According to Niche, the school has a gender ratio of 51-49% of women to men, as well as 51.1% White, 44.4% Hispanic, 2.2% African American, and 2.2% Multiracial.
