= New Mexico State Road 77 =

State highway in New Mexico, United States

State Road 77

Route information
- Maintained by NMDOT
- Length: 12.559 mi (20.212 km)

Major junctions
- West end: NM 209 in Clovis
- East end: FM 2290

Location
- Country: United States
- State: New Mexico
- Counties: Curry

Highway system
- New Mexico State Highway System; Interstate; US; State; Scenic
← NM 76	→ NM 78

State Road 77 (NM 77) is a state highway in the US state of New Mexico. Its total length is approximately 12.5 miles (20.1 km). NM 77's western terminus is at NM 209 in Clovis, and the eastern terminus is at FM 2290 at the Texas / New Mexico border.

== Major intersections ==
The entire route is in Curry County.

Location	mi	km	Destinations	Notes
Clovis	0.000	0.000	NM 209 – Clovis, Tucumcari	Western terminus
	11.875	19.111	NM 108	
	12.559	20.212	FM 2290	Eastern terminus
1.000 mi = 1.609 km; 1.000 km = 0.621 mi
