= McAlister, New Mexico =

- Unincorporated comumunity
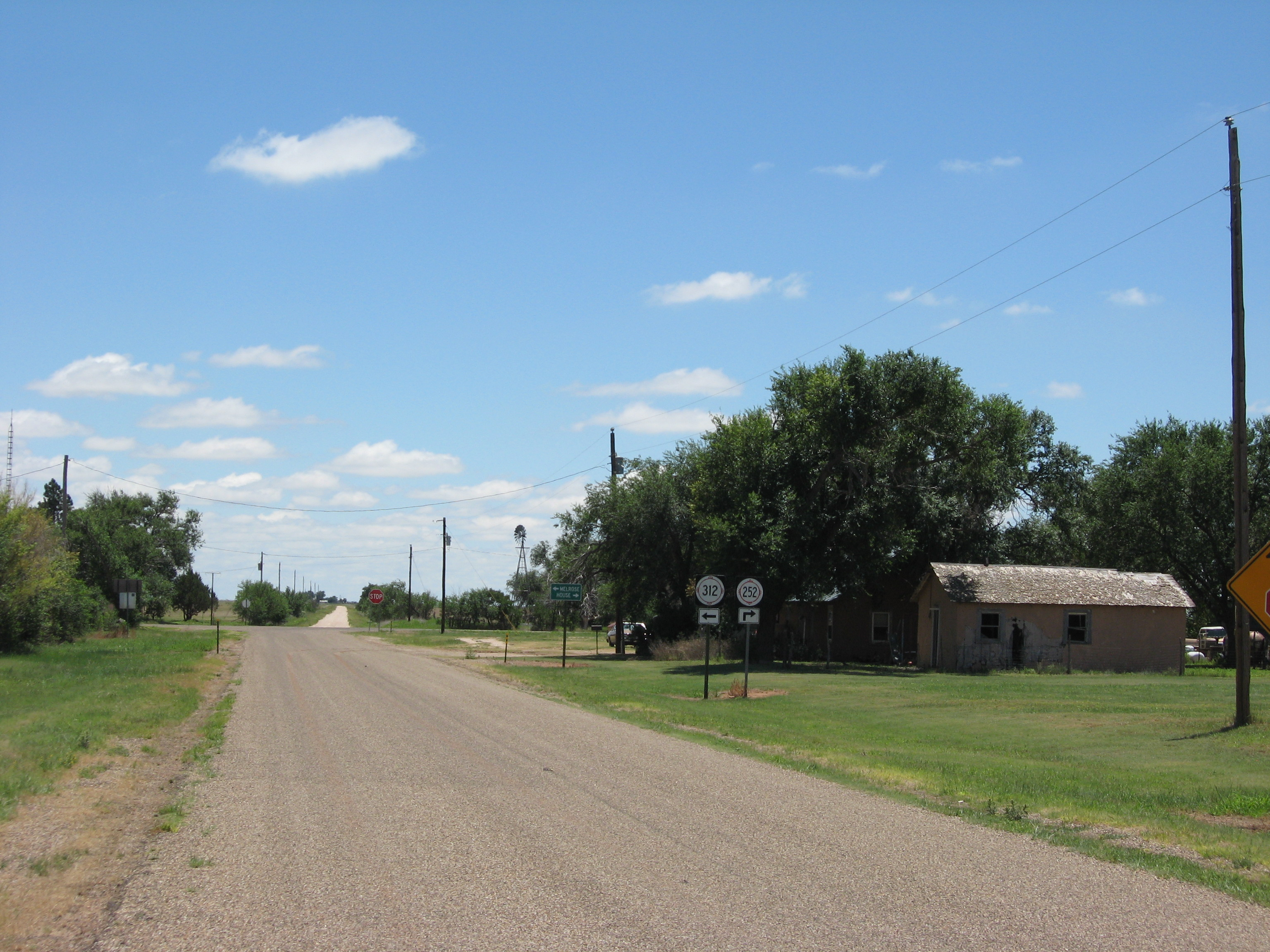
- Interactive map of McAlister, New Mexico
- Coordinates: 34°41′32″N 103°46′35″W
- Country: United States
- State: New Mexico
- County: Quay
- Elevation: 4,725 ft (1,440 m)
- Time zone: UTC-7 (MST)
  - Summer (DST): UTC-6 (MDT)
- ZIP Code: 88427
- Area code: 575
- GNIS feature ID: 898570

McAlister is an unincorporated community in Quay County, New Mexico, United States. It is located on New Mexico State Road 252, east of House.
