= New Mexico State Road 288 =

State highway in New Mexico, United States

State Road 288

Route information
- Maintained by NMDOT
- Length: 27.503 mi (44.262 km)

Major junctions
- Western end: NM 268 in Weber City
- Eastern end: NM 209 near Clovis

Location
- Country: United States
- State: New Mexico
- Counties: Curry

Highway system
- New Mexico State Highway System; Interstate; US; State; Scenic
← NM 286	→ NM 289

State Road 288 (NM 288) is a 27.503-mile-long (44.262 km) state highway in the US state of New Mexico. NM 288's western terminus is at NM 268 in Weber City, and the eastern terminus is at NM 209 north of Clovis.

== Major intersections ==
The entire route is in Curry County.

Location	mi	km	Destinations	Notes
Weber City	0.000	0.000	NM 268	Western terminus
	3.977	6.400	NM 224 south	Northern terminus of NM 224
	25.940	41.746	NM 289 north	Southern terminus of NM 289
	27.503	44.262	NM 209	Eastern terminus
1.000 mi = 1.609 km; 1.000 km = 0.621 mi
