= New Mexico State Road 224 =

State highway in New Mexico, United States

State Road 224

Route information
- Maintained by NMDOT
- Length: 15.600 mi (25.106 km)

Major junctions
- South end: US 60 / US 84 near Melrose
- North end: NM 288 near Alamo

Location
- Country: United States
- State: New Mexico
- Counties: Curry

Highway system
- New Mexico State Highway System; Interstate; US; State; Scenic
| ← NM 223 | → NM 225 |

State Road 224 (NM 224) is a 15.6-mile-long (25.1 km) state highway in the US state of New Mexico. NM 224's southern terminus is at U.S. Route 60 (US 60) and US 84 east of Melrose, and the northern terminus is at NM 288.

== Major intersections ==
The entire route is in Curry County.

| Location | mi | km | Destinations | Notes |
|---|---|---|---|---|
| | 0.000 | 0.000 | US 60 / US 84 | Southern terminus |
| | 9.000 | 14.484 | NM 311 east | Western terminus of NM 311 |
| | 15.600 | 25.106 | NM 288 | Northern terminus |
1.000 mi = 1.609 km; 1.000 km = 0.621 mi
