= New Mexico State Road 252 =

State highway in New Mexico, United States

State Road 252

Route information
- Maintained by NMDOT
- Length: 43.106 mi (69.372 km)

Major junctions
- South end: US 60 / US 84 in Taiban
- North end: NM 209 in Ragland

Location
- Country: United States
- State: New Mexico
- Counties: Debaca, Quay

Highway system
- New Mexico State Highway System; Interstate; US; State; Scenic
← NM 251	→ NM 253

State Road 252 (NM 252) is a 43.1-mile-long (69.4 km) state highway in the U.S. state of New Mexico. Its southern terminus is at U.S. Route 60 (US 60) and US 84 in Taiban, and the northern terminus is in Ragland at NM 209.

== Major intersections ==
County	Location	mi	km	Destinations	Notes
De Baca	Taiban	0.000	0.000	US 60 / US 84	Southern terminus
Quay	House	22.125	35.607	NM 89 south	Northern terminus of NM 89
Quay	McAlister	32.114	51.682	NM 312 east	Western terminus of NM 312
Quay		39.200	63.086	NM 156 west	Eastern terminus of NM 156
Quay	Ragland	43.106	69.372	NM 209	Northern terminus
1.000 mi = 1.609 km; 1.000 km = 0.621 mi
