= New Mexico State Road 245 =

State highway in New Mexico, United States

State Road 245
- Llano Estacado Boulevard

Route information
- Maintained by NMDOT
- Length: 7.021 mi (11.299 km)

Major junctions
- West end: NM 311 near Cannon Air Force Base
- East end: NM 209 in Clovis

Location
- Country: United States
- State: New Mexico
- Counties: Curry

Highway system
- New Mexico State Highway System; Interstate; US; State; Scenic
← NM 244	→ NM 246

State Road 245 (NM 245) is a 7.021-mile-long (11.299 km) state highway in the US state of New Mexico. NM 245's western terminus is at NM 311 north of Cannon Air Force Base, and the eastern terminus is at NM 209 in Clovis. NM 245 is also known as Llano Estacado Boulevard.

== Major intersections ==
The entire route is in Curry County.

Location	mi	km	Destinations	Notes
	0.000	0.000	NM 311	Western terminus
Clovis	7.021	11.299	NM 209	Eastern terminus
1.000 mi = 1.609 km; 1.000 km = 0.621 mi
