= USS Curry County =

1944 LST-542-class tank landing ship

History

United States
- Name: USS LST-685
- Builder: Jeffersonville Boat & Machine Company, Jeffersonville, Indiana
- Laid down: 21 December 1943
- Launched: 18 February 1944
- Commissioned: 7 April 1944
- Decommissioned: 22 July 1946
- Renamed: USS Curry County (LST-685), 1 July 1955
- Stricken: 1 November 1958
- Fate: Sold into commercial service

General characteristics
- Class & type: LST-542-class tank landing ship
- Displacement: 1,625 long tons (1,651 t) light; 4,080 long tons (4,145 t) full
- Length: 328 ft (100 m)
- Beam: 50 ft (15 m)
- Draft: Unloaded : 2 ft 4 in (0.71 m) forward; 7 ft 6 in (2.29 m) aft; Loaded : 8 ft 2 in (2.49 m) forward; 14 ft 1 in (4.29 m) aft
- Propulsion: 2 × General Motors 12-567 diesel engines, two shafts, twin rudders
- Speed: 12 knots (22 km/h; 14 mph)
- Boats & landing craft carried: 2 LCVPs
- Troops: 16 officers, 147 enlisted men
- Complement: 7 officers, 104 enlisted men
- Armament: 8 × 40 mm guns; 12 × 20 mm guns

USS Curry County (LST-685) was an LST-542-class tank landing ship built for the United States Navy during World War II. Named after counties in New Mexico and Oregon, she was the only U.S. Naval vessel to bear the name.

LST-685 was laid down on 21 December 1943 at Jeffersonville, Indiana by the Jeffersonville Boat & Machine Company; launched on 18 February 1944; sponsored by Miss Agnes J. Langley; and commissioned on 7 April 1944.

== Service history ==
Following World War II, LST-685 performed occupation duty in the Far East until mid-April 1946. She returned to the United States and was decommissioned on 22 July 1946. On 13 January 1947 the ship was placed in service and used for Naval Reserve training out of Tompkinsville, New York. She was inactivated on 2 June 1950 at Green Cove Springs, Florida. On 1 July 1955 she was redesignated USS Curry County (LST-685). The tank landing ship was struck from the Naval Vessel Register on 1 November 1958.

Sold for commercial purposes (date unknown), the ship was listed in the 1959 issue of La Marina Mercante Argentina edited by the Instituto de Estudios de la Marina Mercante Argentina as Sulmar, owned by Navemar S. A., Argentina, working between Argentine and Brazilian ports. Her final fate is unknown.

== See also ==
- List of United States Navy LSTs
- Curry County, New Mexico
- Curry County, Oregon
