= New Mexico State Road 210 =

State highway in New Mexico, United States

State Road 210

Route information
- Maintained by NMDOT
- Length: 4.008 mi (6.450 km)

Major junctions
- South end: NM 268 near Forrest
- North end: NM 209 near Forrest

Location
- Country: United States
- State: New Mexico
- Counties: Quay

Highway system
- New Mexico State Highway System; Interstate; US; State; Scenic
← NM 209	→ NM 211

State Road 210 (NM 210) is a 4.008-mile-long (6.450 km) state highway in the US state of New Mexico. NM 210's southern terminus is at NM 268 west of Forrest, and the northern terminus is at NM 209 north of Forrest.

== Major intersections ==
The entire route is in Quay County.

Location	mi	km	Destinations	Notes
	0.000	0.000	NM 268	Southern terminus
	4.008	6.450	NM 209	Northern terminus
1.000 mi = 1.609 km; 1.000 km = 0.621 mi
