= New Mexico State Road 523 =

State highway in New Mexico, United States

State Road 523
- NM 523 highlighted in red

Route information
- Maintained by NMDOT
- Length: 6.247 mi (10.054 km)

Major junctions
- West end: 21st Street in Clovis
- East end: NM 108 near Texico

Location
- Country: United States
- State: New Mexico
- Counties: Valencia

Highway system
- New Mexico State Highway System; Interstate; US; State; Scenic
← NM 522	→ NM 524

State Road 523 (NM 523) is an approximately 6.25-mile-long (10.06 km) state highway in the US state of New Mexico. NM 523's western terminus is a continuation of 21st Street at the Clovis city limit, and the eastern terminus is at NM 108 north of Texico.

== History ==
The portion of 21st Street in Clovis from NM 209 to the city line was originally NM 523, but was transferred to the city of Clovis on December 1, 1989, in a road exchange agreement.

== Major intersections ==
The entire route is in Curry County.

Location	mi	km	Destinations	Notes
Clovis	0.000	0.000	21st Street; To NM 209	Western terminus
	6.247	10.054	NM 108	Eastern terminus
1.000 mi = 1.609 km; 1.000 km = 0.621 mi
