= New Mexico State Road 156 =

State highway in New Mexico, United States

State Road 156

Route information
- Maintained by NMDOT
- Length: 60.603 mi (97.531 km)

Major junctions
- West end: US 84 in Santa Rosa
- Historic US 66
- East end: NM 252 near Ragland

Location
- Country: United States
- State: New Mexico
- Counties: Guadalupe, Quay

Highway system
- New Mexico State Highway System; Interstate; US; State; Scenic
← NM 155	→ NM 157

State Road 156 (NM 156) is a 60.6-mile-long (97.5 km) state highway in the US state of New Mexico. NM 156's western terminus is at U.S. Route 84 (US 84) in Santa Rosa, and the eastern terminus is at NM 252 south of Ragland.

== Major intersections ==
County	Location	mi	km	Destinations	Notes
Guadalupe	Santa Rosa	0.000	0.000	US 84	Western terminus
Guadalupe		8.600	13.840	Historic US 66	
Quay		60.603	97.531	NM 252	Eastern terminus
1.000 mi = 1.609 km; 1.000 km = 0.621 mi
