= Logan High School (New Mexico) =

Public school in Logan, New Mexico

Location
- Coordinates: 35.3676°N 103.4138°W

Information
- School type: Public
- Years offered: 9–12
- Enrollment: 89
- Mascot: Longhorns
- Website: https://www.loganschool.net/

Logan High School is a public high school in Logan, New Mexico. Serving Logan and the surrounding area, it has 89 students as of 2026.

== Athletics ==
Logan High School's mascot is a Longhorn.

LHS participates in 1A track in New Mexico, having won multiple awards. They also won the 1A championship in basketball in 2012 and in 2025.
