= New Mexico State Road 241 =

State highway in New Mexico, United States

State Road 241

Route information
- Maintained by NMDOT
- Length: 9.7 mi (15.6 km)

Major junctions
- West end: NM 209 in Broadview
- East end: FM 1058 at the Texas/ New Mexico border

Location
- Country: United States
- State: New Mexico
- Counties: Curry

Highway system
- New Mexico State Highway System; Interstate; US; State; Scenic
← NM 240	→ NM 243

State Road 241 (NM 241) is a 9.7-mile-long (15.6 km) state highway in the U.S. state of New Mexico. New Mexico 241's western terminus is at NM 209 in Broadview, and the eastern terminus is at Farm to Market Road 1058 (FM 1058) at the Texas–New Mexico border.

== Major intersections ==
The entire route is in Curry County.

Location	mi	km	Destinations	Notes
Broadview	0.000	0.000	NM 209	Western terminus
Broadview	0.145	0.233	NM 275	
	9.700	15.611	FM 1058	Eastern terminus
1.000 mi = 1.609 km; 1.000 km = 0.621 mi
