= New Mexico State Road 540 =

State highway in New Mexico, United States

State Road 540
- NM 540 highlighted in red

Route information
- Maintained by NMDOT
- Length: 4.4 mi (7.1 km)

Major junctions
- West end: End of state maintenance near Logan
- East end: US 54 in Logan

Location
- Country: United States
- State: New Mexico
- Counties: Quay

Highway system
- New Mexico State Highway System; Interstate; US; State; Scenic
← NM 539	→ NM 542

State Road 540 (NM 540) is a 4.4-mile-long (7.1 km) state highway in the US state of New Mexico. NM 540's western terminus is at the end of state maintenance west of Logan, and the eastern terminus is at U.S. Route 54 (US 54) in Logan.

== Major intersections ==
The entire route is in Quay County.

Location	mi	km	Destinations	Notes
Logan	0.000	0.000	US 54	Eastern terminus
	4.400	7.081	End of state maintenance	Western terminus
1.000 mi = 1.609 km; 1.000 km = 0.621 mi
