= Texico Municipal Schools =

K-12 school district in Texico, New Mexico, U.S.

Texico High School

Location
- 520 North Griffin Street; Texico, (Curry County), New Mexico 88135; United States; 34.393226°N 103.050103°W

Information
- Type: Public high school
- Principal: DeeRay Timberlake
- Staff: 11.42 (FTE)
- Enrollment: 179 (2023-24)
- Student to teacher ratio: 15.67
- Colors: Green and white
- Nickname: Wolverines
- Website: Texico High School

Texico Municipal Schools is a K-12 school district headquartered in Texico, New Mexico.

Most of the district is located in Curry County, with a section in Roosevelt County.

== History ==
Circa 1953 the district bought, from the federal government, a 728-square-foot (67.6 m^{2}), three bedroom cottage for home economics classes. The district had it transported for 800 miles (1,300 km).

In 1974 the district's proposed $150,000 bond to construct a new middle school was approved by the voting public.

== Schools ==
All schools and the district administration are at the same address:

- Texico Elementary School
- Texico Middle School
- Texico High School
