= New Mexico State Road 311 =

State highway in New Mexico, United States

State Road 311

Route information
- Maintained by NMDOT
- Length: 22.869 mi (36.804 km)

Major junctions
- Western end: NM 224 near Field
- Eastern end: US 60 / US 84 near Clovis

Location
- Country: United States
- State: New Mexico
- Counties: Curry

Highway system
- New Mexico State Highway System; Interstate; US; State; Scenic
← NM 309	→ NM 312

State Road 311 (NM 311) is a 22.9-mile-long (36.9 km) state highway in the US state of New Mexico. NM 311's western terminus is at NM 224 south of Field, and the eastern terminus is at U.S. Route 60 (US 60) and US 84 west of Clovis.

== Major intersections ==
The entire route is in Curry County.

Location	mi	km	Destinations	Notes
	0.000	0.000	NM 224	Western terminus
	20.869	33.585	NM 245 east	Western terminus of NM 245
	22.869	36.804	US 60 / US 84	Eastern terminus
1.000 mi = 1.609 km; 1.000 km = 0.621 mi
