= Grady Municipal School District =

School district in New Mexico, United States

Address
- 100 Franklin Street Grady, New Mexico, 88120; United States

District information
- Type: Public
- Grades: Pre-K–12
- NCES District ID: 3501140

Students and staff
- Students: 174
- Teachers: 17.12
- Staff: 2.21
- Student–teacher ratio: 10.16

Other information
- Website: www.gradyschool.com

Grady Municipal School District is a school district headquartered in Grady, New Mexico.

The district occupies sections of Curry and Quay counties.

== Schools ==
- Grady Elementary School
- Grady Middle School
- Grady High School
