= St. Vrain, New Mexico =

Unincorporated community in New Mexico, United States

St. Vrain
- Unincorporated community
- Location within the state of New Mexico St. Vrain (the United States)
- Coordinates: 34°24′58″N 103°29′23″W
- Country: United States
- State: New Mexico
- County: Curry
- Elevation: 4,397 ft (1,340 m)
- Time zone: UTC-7 (Mountain (MST))
  - Summer (DST): UTC-6 (MDT)
- ZIP codes: 88133
- Area code: 575
- GNIS feature ID: 915892

St. Vrain is an unincorporated community in Curry County, New Mexico, United States. The community is located on U.S. routes 60 and 84, 16.3 miles (26.2 km) west of Clovis. St. Vrain had a post office until it closed on August 1, 2011; it still has its own ZIP code, 88133.
