= Wheatland, New Mexico =

Unincorporated community in New Mexico, United States

- Unincorporated comumunity
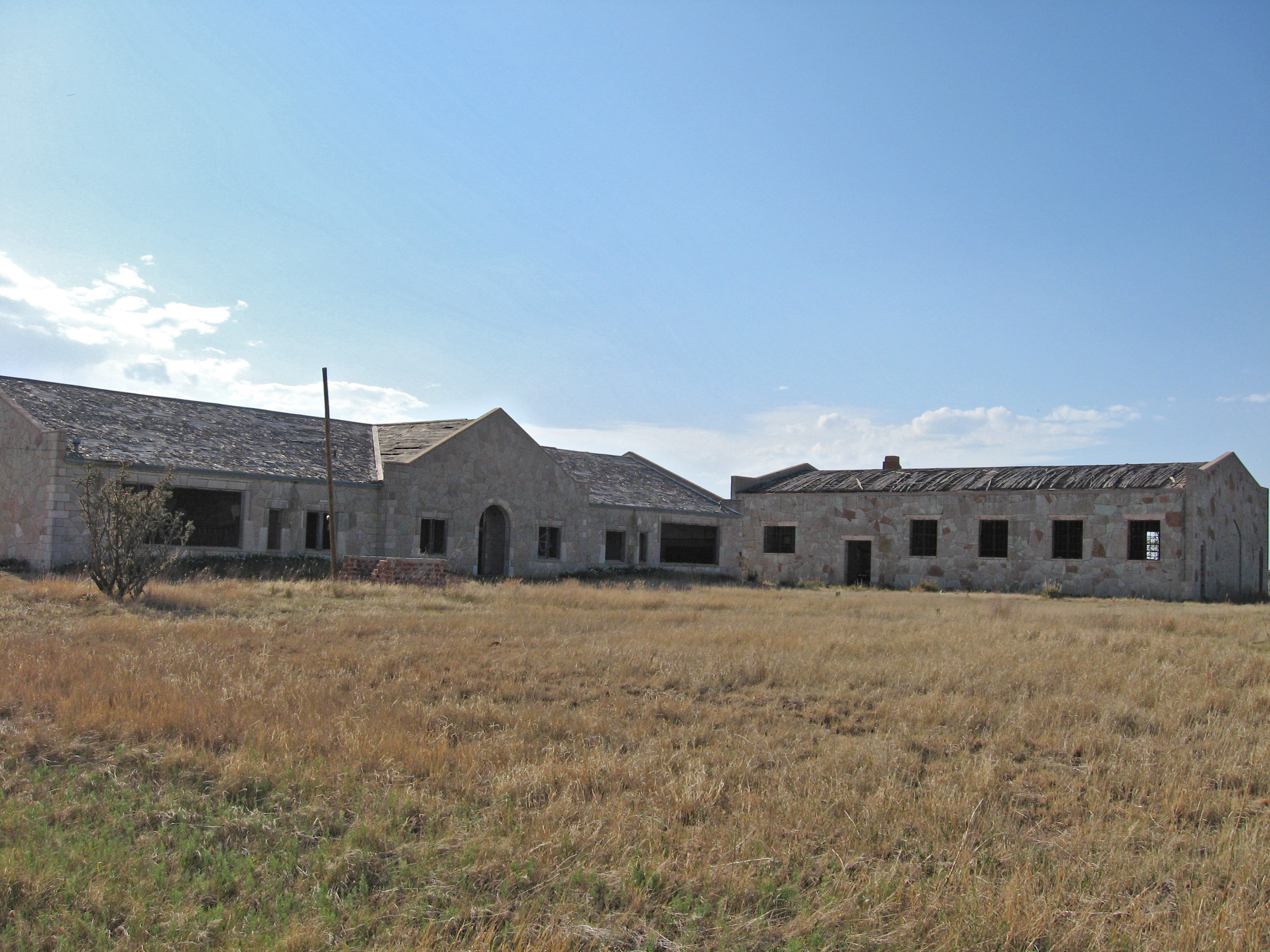
- Wheatland School (abandoned)
- Interactive map of Wheatland, New Mexico
- Coordinates: 34°54′31″N 103°21′15″W
- Country: United States
- State: New Mexico
- County: Quay
- Elevation: 4,764 ft (1,452 m)
- Time zone: UTC-7 (MST)
  - Summer (DST): UTC-6 (MDT)
- Area code: 575
- GNIS feature ID: 898611

Wheatland is an unincorporated community in Quay County, New Mexico, United States. It is located approximated 15 miles (24 km) south of San Jon along New Mexico State Road 469.

== History ==
Wheatland traces its beginnings to the building of its first school. Several one-room schools existed in the area, including North Bend School, Blair School, and Adobe School. In 1920, these were consolidated to form Wheatland School, which was housed in a frame stucco building constructed for the purpose.

The original Wheatland School burned in April 1938. It was replaced by a new school building and gymnasium built by the WPA. The new buildings, reinforced with steel and plastered inside, used multicolored rock from a nearby quarry. A duplex teacherage was also built at the same time. Completed in 1939, the buildings were only used as a school until the early 1950s, after which they were used as a community center for a time before being abandoned.
