= Endee, New Mexico =

- Unincorporated community
- Location within New Mexico Location within the United States
- Coordinates: 35°08′16″N 103°06′28″W
- Country: United States
- State: New Mexico
- County: Quay
- Elevation: 3,822 ft (1,165 m)
- Time zone: UTC-7 (Mountain (MST))
  - Summer (DST): UTC-6 (MDT)
- GNIS feature ID: 898546

Endee is a ghost town on the route of historic Route 66 in Quay County, New Mexico, United States. The town was founded circa 1885 and named after the brand of the ND Ranch. In 1952, Route 66 was rerouted so it bypassed Endee.

Endee was a supply center for ranches in the area. In 1946, the town consisted of a grocery store, a gas station with "modern restrooms", a repair garage, a school, and a scattering of cabins. A post office also operated in Endee from 1886 to 1955.
