= Logan, New Mexico =

- Village
- Location within Quay County and New Mexico

- Location in the United States
- Coordinates: 35°21′41″N 103°26′52″W
- Country: United States
- State: New Mexico
- County: Quay

Area
  - Total: 11.31 sq mi (29.28 km^{2})
  - Land: 10.59 sq mi (27.44 km^{2})
  - Water: 0.71 sq mi (1.84 km^{2})
- Elevation: 3,806 ft (1,160 m)

Population (2020)
  - Total: 970
  - Density: 91.6/sq mi (35.35/km^{2})
- Time zone: UTC-7 (Mountain (MST))
  - Summer (DST): UTC-6 (MDT)
- ZIP code: 88426
- Area code: 575
- FIPS code: 35-42040
- GNIS ID: 2413566

Logan is a village in Quay County, New Mexico, United States. The population was 970 at the 2020 census.

== History ==
Logan was born when the Chicago, Rock Island and Pacific Railroad constructed a bridge over the Canadian River. Eugene Logan was a well-known Texas Ranger who came to work on the bridge.

In 1963 and 1964, Ute Dam, its reservoir, and Ute Lake State Park were built west of Logan.

On March 23, 2007, severe thunderstorms passed through Eastern New Mexico and West Texas which spawned several tornadoes, including one in Logan, which destroyed 30 motor homes and mobile homes. Three were injured.

== Geography ==
According to the United States Census Bureau, the village has a total area of 8.4 square miles (22 km^{2}), of which 8.0 square miles (21 km^{2}) is land and 0.5 square miles (1.3 km^{2}) (5.58%) is water.

== Demographics ==
Historical population
Census	Pop.	Note	%±
1970	386		—
1980	735		90.4%
1990	870		18.4%
2000	1,094		25.7%
2010	1,042		−4.8%
2020	970		−6.9%
U.S. Decennial Census

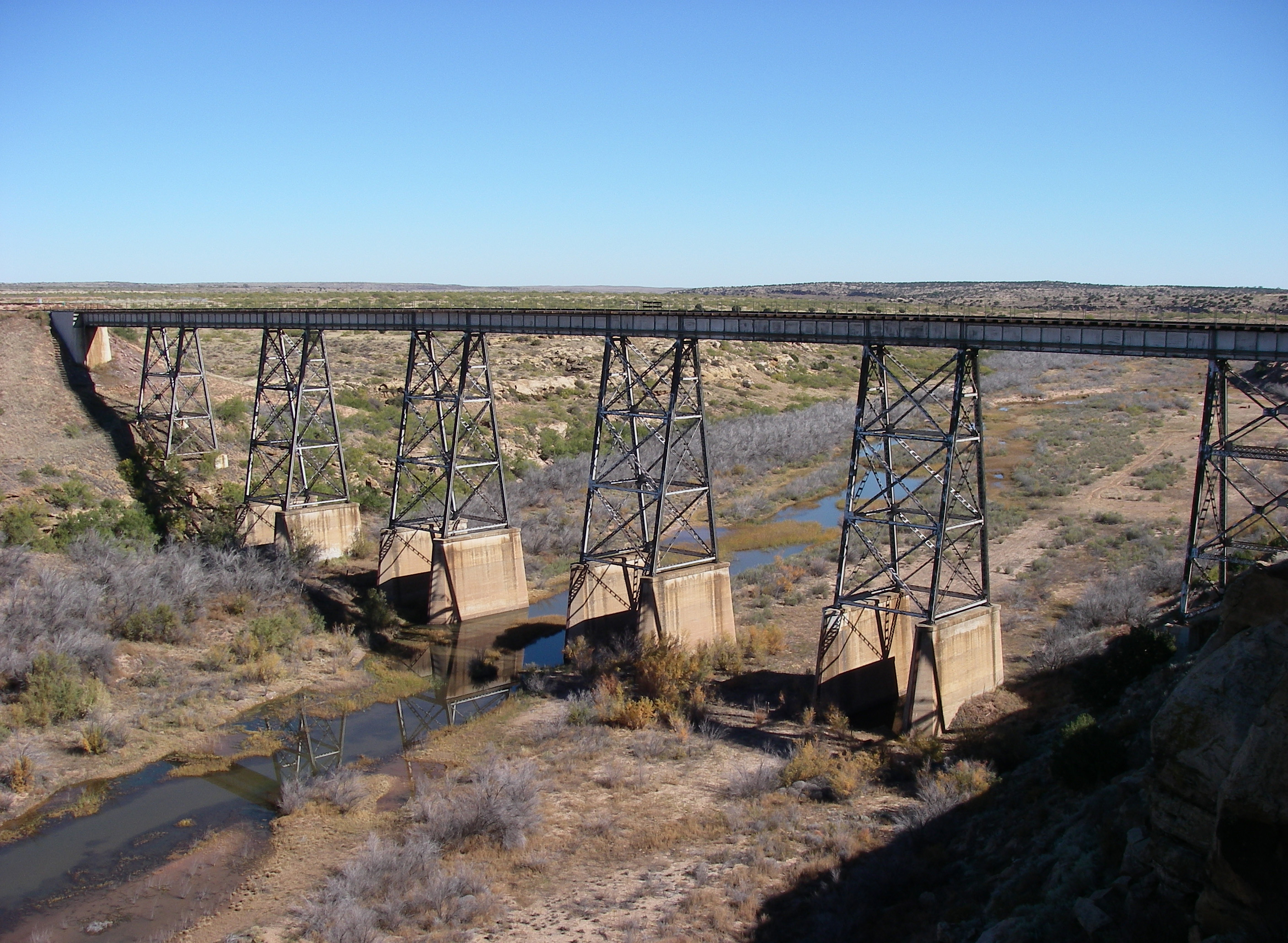
Railroad bridge spanning the Canadian River valley southwest of Logan

As of the census of 2000, there were 1,094 people, 485 households, and 342 families residing in the village. The population density was 137.5 inhabitants per square mile (53.1/km^{2}). There were 1,010 housing units at an average density of 126.9 per square mile (49.0/km^{2}). The racial makeup of the village was 89.21% White, 0.27% African American, 1.01% Native American, 0.18% Pacific Islander, 6.12% from other races, and 3.20% from two or more races. Hispanic or Latino of any race were 20.38% of the population.

There were 485 households, out of which 23.5% had children under the age of 18 living with them, 60.0% were married couples living together, 8.0% had a female householder with no husband present, and 29.3% were non-families. 27.8% of all households were made up of individuals, and 15.7% had someone living alone who was 65 years of age or older. The average household size was 2.26 and the average family size was 2.71.

In the village, the population was spread out, with 21.2% under the age of 18, 4.8% from 18 to 24, 19.7% from 25 to 44, 27.1% from 45 to 64, and 27.1% who were 65 years of age or older. The median age was 48 years. For every 100 females, there were 97.1 males. For every 100 females age 18 and over, there were 96.4 males.

The median income for a household in the village was $24,871, and the median income for a family was $31,528. Males had a median income of $28,125 versus $16,393 for females. The per capita income for the village was $13,069. About 7.1% of families and 11.1% of the population were below the poverty line, including 12.2% of those under age 18 and 9.7% of those age 65 or over.

== Transportation ==
U.S. Route 54 highway runs through this village. NM 540 highway ends at Logan.

The Union Pacific Railroad passes through Logan, and there is one short siding.
