= Quay County, New Mexico =

County in New Mexico, United States

- County
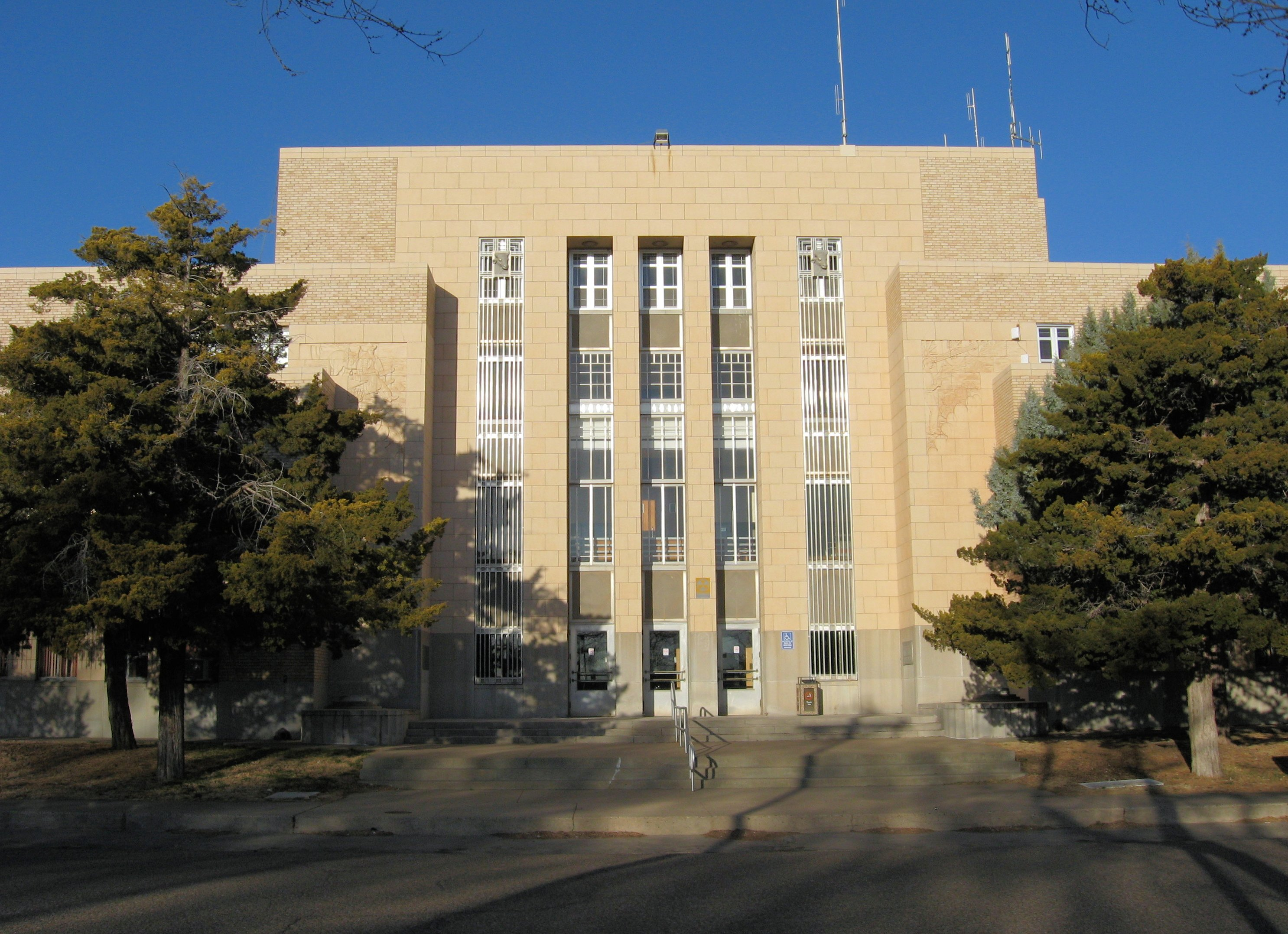
- Quay County Courthouse in Tucumcari

- Location within the U.S. state of New Mexico
- Coordinates: 35°07′N 103°33′W
- Country: United States
- State: New Mexico
- Founded: February 28, 1903
- Named for: Matthew Quay
- Seat: Tucumcari
- Largest city: Tucumcari

Area
  - Total: 2,882 sq mi (7,460 km^{2})
  - Land: 2,874 sq mi (7,440 km^{2})
  - Water: 7.2 sq mi (19 km^{2}) 0.3%

Population (2020)
  - Total: 8,746
  - Estimate (2025): 8,454 ▼
  - Density: 3.043/sq mi (1.175/km^{2})

Time zones
- Entire county (legally): UTC−7 (Mountain)
  - Summer (DST): UTC−6 (MDT)
- Nara Visa (unofficially): UTC−6 (Central)
  - Summer (DST): UTC−5 (CDT)
- ZIP Codes: 88121, 88426, 88427, 88430, 88433, 88434, 88401, 88411
- Area code: 575
- Congressional district: 3rd
- Website: quaycounty-nm.gov

Quay County (/ˈkweɪ/) is a county in the state of New Mexico. As of the 2020 U.S. census, the population was 8,746. Its county seat is Tucumcari. The county was named for Pennsylvania senator Matthew Quay, who supported statehood for New Mexico. Its eastern border is the Texas state line, approximately 103.04 degrees west longitude.

== History ==
=== Early history ===
Modern-day Quay County was once home to a massive inland sea, known as the Western Interior Seaway. Like the rest of New Mexico, Quay County has a strong paleontological history and dinosaur fossils have been found in the area.

The earliest known evidence of human activity dates back to roughly 9500 BC, when the Clovis culture emerged in the region. Around 900 AD, the Ancestral Puebloan culture emerged in the region, and is believed to have lasted until roughly 1400 AD. While settlement was largely in the Four Corners region of the state, artifacts have been discovered in Quay County as well, and the area is believed to have been a trade route or a temporary hunting site. By the 1500s, Native American tribes such as the Apache and Comanche had emerged, using the area as hunting grounds. Around this time, Spanish explorers began scouting the area, but did not settle in Quay County or establish any missions or trading posts.

=== Colonial history ===
European settlements emerged in Quay County around the 17th century, although they never gained any major size or importance. Tensions between settlers and Native American tribes were common due to Comanchero interference, and settlement remained sparse until the Americans obtained control of the New Mexico Territory and established Fort Bascom in 1863. As Native Americans were relocated following the Apache Wars, settlers steadily moved into the area and the cattle industry spilled over from Texas, becoming the dominant economic driver of the region. Prior to the 1860s, most settlers had been Hispano ranchers and shepherds, but by 1899 the region was full of Anglo-American homesteaders.

=== 20th century and modern day ===
In 1902, the railroad came to Quay County. Tucumcari and Logan were founded as railroad camps for the Chicago, Rock Island and Pacific Railroad, and Quay County was officially split off from neighboring Guadalupe County and incorporated in 1903. By 1913, Tucumcari had become a boomtown. Around this time, harsh weather and tensions with ranchers caused most of the homesteaders to abandon the region, and by the 1920s Quay County was predominantly home to ranchers and new urban residents.

Tucumcari grew so quickly during this time that it was one of few areas in the United States to not be significantly affected by the Great Depression. Following World War I, returning servicemembers proved a boon to the economy and a building boom began that lasted for years.

In 1926, U.S. Route 66 was established, quickly surpassing the railroad in terms of importance. Quay County was a major thoroughfare, and the population of the area boomed as the economy quickly shifted towards the service sector. By the 1950s, Tucumcari was referred to as "Little Las Vegas" and was one of the most important commercial centers of eastern New Mexico.

With the advent of the Interstate Highway System in the 1960s, Quay County quickly declined in importance as I-40 (which served only Tucumcari) replaced Route 66. The population of Quay County has since declined steadily, and it is now a rural area with only one large commercial center at Tucumcari.

== Geography ==
According to the U.S. Census Bureau, the county has a total area of 2,882 square miles (7,460 km^{2}), of which 2,874 square miles (7,440 km^{2}) is land and 7.2 square miles (19 km^{2}) (0.3%) is water.

=== Adjacent counties ===
- Union County - north
- Harding County - northwest
- San Miguel County - west
- Guadalupe County - west
- De Baca County - southwest
- Roosevelt County - south
- Curry County - south
- Deaf Smith County, Texas - southeast
- Oldham County, Texas - east
- Hartley County, Texas - northeast

== Demographics ==
Historical population
Census	Pop.	Note	%±
1910	14,912		—
1920	10,444		−30.0%
1930	10,828		3.7%
1940	12,111		11.8%
1950	13,971		15.4%
1960	12,279		−12.1%
1970	10,903		−11.2%
1980	10,577		−3.0%
1990	10,823		2.3%
2000	10,155		−6.2%
2010	9,041		−11.0%
2020	8,746		−3.3%
2025 (est.)	8,454	▼	−3.3%
U.S. Decennial Census; 1790-1960 1900-1990; 1990-2000 2010

=== 2020 census ===
As of the 2020 census, the county had a population of 8,746. The median age was 47.5 years. 21.9% of residents were under the age of 18 and 26.1% of residents were 65 years of age or older. For every 100 females there were 96.5 males, and for every 100 females age 18 and over there were 94.3 males age 18 and over.

Quay County, New Mexico – Racial and ethnic composition Note: the US Census treats Hispanic/Latino as an ethnic category. This table excludes Latinos from the racial categories and assigns them to a separate category. Hispanics/Latinos may be of any race.
Race / Ethnicity (NH = Non-Hispanic)	Pop 2000	Pop 2010	Pop 2020	% 2000	% 2010	% 2020
White alone (NH)	5,953	4,847	4,434	58.62%	53.61%	50.70%
Black or African American alone (NH)	78	82	89	0.77%	0.91%	1.02%
Native American or Alaska Native alone (NH)	78	69	57	0.77%	0.76%	0.65%
Asian alone (NH)	81	78	48	0.80%	0.86%	0.55%
Pacific Islander alone (NH)	6	4	2	0.06%	0.04%	0.02%
Other race alone (NH)	4	9	36	0.04%	0.10%	0.41%
Mixed race or Multiracial (NH)	98	118	232	0.97%	1.31%	2.65%
Hispanic or Latino (any race)	3,857	3,834	3,848	37.98%	42.41%	44.00%
Total	10,155	9,041	8,746	100.00%	100.00%	100.00%

The racial makeup of the county was 70.7% White, 1.3% Black or African American, 1.6% American Indian and Alaska Native, 0.6% Asian, 0.1% Native Hawaiian and Pacific Islander, 11.5% from some other race, and 14.4% from two or more races. Hispanic or Latino residents of any race comprised 44.0% of the population.

59.7% of residents lived in urban areas, while 40.3% lived in rural areas.

There were 3,922 households in the county, of which 25.5% had children under the age of 18 living with them and 30.4% had a female householder with no spouse or partner present. About 35.2% of all households were made up of individuals and 18.7% had someone living alone who was 65 years of age or older.

There were 5,471 housing units, of which 28.3% were vacant. Among occupied housing units, 69.3% were owner-occupied and 30.7% were renter-occupied. The homeowner vacancy rate was 2.1% and the rental vacancy rate was 12.7%.

=== 2010 census ===
As of the 2010 census, there were 9,041 people, 4,072 households, and 2,502 families living in the county. The population density was 3.1 inhabitants per square mile (1.2/km^{2}). There were 5,569 housing units at an average density of 1.9 units per square mile (0.73 units/km^{2}). The racial makeup of the county was 86.1% white, 1.2% American Indian, 1.1% black or African American, 1.0% Asian, 7.2% from other races, and 3.4% from two or more races. Those of Hispanic or Latino origin made up 42.4% of the population. In terms of ancestry, 11.4% were American, 10.7% were English, 10.5% were German, and 9.8% were Irish.

Of the 4,072 households, 26.4% had children under the age of 18 living with them, 43.5% were married couples living together, 12.7% had a female householder with no husband present, 38.6% were non-families, and 34.2% of all households were made up of individuals. The average household size was 2.21 and the average family size was 2.79. The median age was 45.6 years.

The median income for a household in the county was $28,773 and the median income for a family was $41,766. Males had a median income of $29,769 versus $32,462 for females. The per capita income for the county was $18,234. About 13.3% of families and 21.1% of the population were below the poverty line, including 30.7% of those under age 18 and 17.3% of those age 65 or over.

=== 2000 census ===
As of the 2000 census, there were 10,155 people, 4,201 households, and 2,844 families living in the county. The population density was 4 people per square mile (1.5 people/km^{2}). There were 5,664 housing units at an average density of 2 units per square mile (0.77/km^{2}). The racial makeup of the county was 82.09% White, 0.84% Black or African American, 1.27% Native American, 0.80% Asian, 0.15% Pacific Islander, 12.11% from other races, and 2.75% from two or more races. 37.98% of the population were Hispanic or Latino of any race.

There were 4,201 households, out of which 28.90% had children under the age of 18 living with them, 52.10% were married couples living together, 12.00% had a female householder with no husband present, and 32.30% were non-families. 28.90% of all households were made up of individuals, and 13.80% had someone living alone who was 65 years of age or older. The average household size was 2.37 and the average family size was 2.90.

In the county, the population was spread out, with 25.00% under the age of 18, 6.70% from 18 to 24, 23.30% from 25 to 44, 26.00% from 45 to 64, and 19.00% who were 65 years of age or older. The median age was 42 years. For every 100 females, there were 94.00 males. For every 100 females age 18 and over, there were 91.50 males.

The median income for a household in the county was $24,894, and the median income for a family was $30,362. Males had a median income of $24,801 versus $17,500 for females. The per capita income for the county was $14,938. About 15.70% of families and 20.90% of the population were below the poverty line, including 25.50% of those under age 18 and 15.80% of those age 65 or over.

== Economy ==
Quay County has a declining economy once dominated by the agriculture and ranching sectors, which remain major employers to this day. In the 1920s, Quay County became an important railroad hub, but the rail industry has since disappeared from the county. The development of Route 66 and I-40 transformed the region into a service-based economy, and now the county's main economic sectors include logistics and service, concentrated around I-40 and Tucumcari, and ranching.

Quay County employment by industry
Industry	Percentage of employment
Education and healthcare	21.7%
Entertainment and service	21.3%
Retail	10.2%
Professional and administrative	7.9%
Public administration	7.2%
Other	7%
Construction	6.4%
Agriculture and mining	5.9%
Logistics and transportation	5.3%
Finance and real estate	3.2%
Manufacturing	1.9%
Wholesale trade	1.1%
Information	0.7%

== Culture and media ==
=== Culture ===
As a rural town along Route 66, Quay County has long been associated with both traditional frontier culture and the 1950s-era road tripping culture that made it a boomtown. Tucumcari was the filming location for the western series Rawhide, and it was one of the major inspirations for the fictional town of Radiator Springs in the film Cars, and many of its events today are either Route 66 oriented or inspired by its earlier days as a Wild west railroad town. Major events and attractions include:

- Rawhide Days, an annual event that showcases the frontier culture of the area, including gunslinger performances and longhorn parades.
- The Mesalands Dinosaur Museum, an attraction at Mesalands Community College that celebrates the region's rich history of paleontology.
- Various Route 66 oriented museums, murals, and displays in Tucumcari.

=== Media ===
==== Newspapers ====
- The Eastern New Mexico News, published in neighboring Curry County since 2016, serves as the newspaper of record for the wider region.
  - The Quay County Sun, published in Tucumcari, is a subsidiary paper published by the Eastern New Mexico News.

== Government and politics ==
Government

At the federal level, Quay County is represented in the United States Senate by Martin Heinrich and Ben Ray Luján, both Democrats. It is represented in the United States House of Representatives as part of New Mexico's 3rd congressional district by Democrat Teresa Leger Fernández. It is part of the New Mexico Senate's 7th and 8th districts, represented by Republican Pat Woods and Democrat Pete Campos, respectively. It is in the New Mexico House of Representatives's 67th district, represented by Republican Jack Chatfield. Judicially, it is in New Mexico's 10th Judicial District Court.

United States presidential election results for Quay County, New Mexico
Year	Republican		Democratic		Third party(ies)	
Year	No.	%	No.	%	No.	%
1912	351	18.69%	884	47.07%	643	34.24%
1916	598	24.95%	1,539	64.21%	260	10.85%
1920	1,213	39.15%	1,813	58.52%	72	2.32%
1924	851	27.84%	1,548	50.64%	658	21.52%
1928	1,616	50.26%	1,594	49.58%	5	0.16%
1932	852	20.90%	3,058	75.01%	167	4.10%
1936	816	19.02%	3,423	79.79%	51	1.19%
1940	1,413	30.39%	3,215	69.14%	22	0.47%
1944	1,449	38.83%	2,272	60.88%	11	0.29%
1948	1,392	30.98%	3,063	68.17%	38	0.85%
1952	2,711	53.00%	2,375	46.43%	29	0.57%
1956	2,311	53.52%	1,988	46.04%	19	0.44%
1960	2,652	56.38%	2,050	43.58%	2	0.04%
1964	2,161	47.86%	2,333	51.67%	21	0.47%
1968	2,123	51.38%	1,399	33.86%	610	14.76%
1972	3,224	71.30%	1,161	25.67%	137	3.03%
1976	2,059	49.08%	2,095	49.94%	41	0.98%
1980	2,499	62.09%	1,422	35.33%	104	2.58%
1984	2,842	66.82%	1,368	32.17%	43	1.01%
1988	2,454	55.62%	1,901	43.09%	57	1.29%
1992	1,759	41.01%	1,758	40.99%	772	18.00%
1996	1,943	46.53%	1,830	43.82%	403	9.65%
2000	2,292	59.63%	1,471	38.27%	81	2.11%
2004	2,661	64.63%	1,422	34.54%	34	0.83%
2008	2,367	59.23%	1,547	38.71%	82	2.05%
2012	2,202	59.40%	1,383	37.31%	122	3.29%
2016	2,212	61.93%	1,017	28.47%	343	9.60%
2020	2,634	68.01%	1,170	30.21%	69	1.78%
2024	2,570	69.38%	1,055	28.48%	79	2.13%

Locally, Quay County is represented by a three-person board of commissioners and several county officials.

Office	Name	Party
Commissioner	Dallas Dowell	Republican
Commissioner	Jerri Rush	Republican
Commissioner	Brian Fortner	Republican

Office	Name	Party
County Clerk	Veronica Manley	Democratic
Assessor	Jefferson Byrd	Republican
Probate Judge	Christina Wilson	Republican
Sheriff	Dennis Garcia	Republican
Treasurer	Theresa Lafferty	Republican

Politics

At formation, Quay County was part of a predominantly Southern Baptist region known as "Little Texas." As such, Quay County had much more in common with traditional Southern Democrats than it did with the more Catholic and Republican Spanish American regions in the west and north, which were much more Southeastern in culture. Quay County was thus a powerfully Democratic county until the 1950s, when it along with North and West Texas began slowly realigning towards Republicans. Quay remained a swing county until the 1960s but continued to vote more in align with Southern Democrats than the rest of New Mexico (in 1968, it was George Wallace's sixth strongest county in the state). It has since followed the southern trend of becoming powerfully Republican, and has given Republicans increasing margins since 2008.

== Education ==
=== Primary education ===
School districts include:

- Grady Municipal Schools
- House Municipal Schools
- Logan Municipal Schools
- Melrose Municipal Schools
- San Jon Municipal Schools
- Tucumcari Public Schools

=== Community colleges ===
- Mesalands Community College

== Transportation ==
=== Airports ===
Quay county has one airport, Tucumcari Municipal Airport. The airport is mainly for civil use.

=== Highways ===
- I-40
  - I-40 BL (Tucumcari)
- US 54
  - US 54 Bus. / NM 237
- NM 39
- NM 88
- NM 89
- NM 93
- NM 104
- NM 156
- NM 209
- NM 210
- NM 231
- NM 252
- NM 256
- NM 275
- NM 278
- NM 286
- NM 312
- NM 392
- NM 402
- NM 469
- NM 540
- NM 552

== Communities ==
=== City ===
- Tucumcari (county seat)

=== Villages ===
- House
- Logan
- San Jon

=== Census-designated place ===
- Nara Visa

=== Other communities ===
- Bard
- Endee
- Forrest
- Glenrio (partly in Deaf Smith County, Texas)
- McAlister
- Montoya
- Quay
- Wheatland

== See also ==
- National Register of Historic Places listings in Quay County, New Mexico
