= Broadview, Curry County, New Mexico =

Broadview, New Mexico
- Unincorporated community
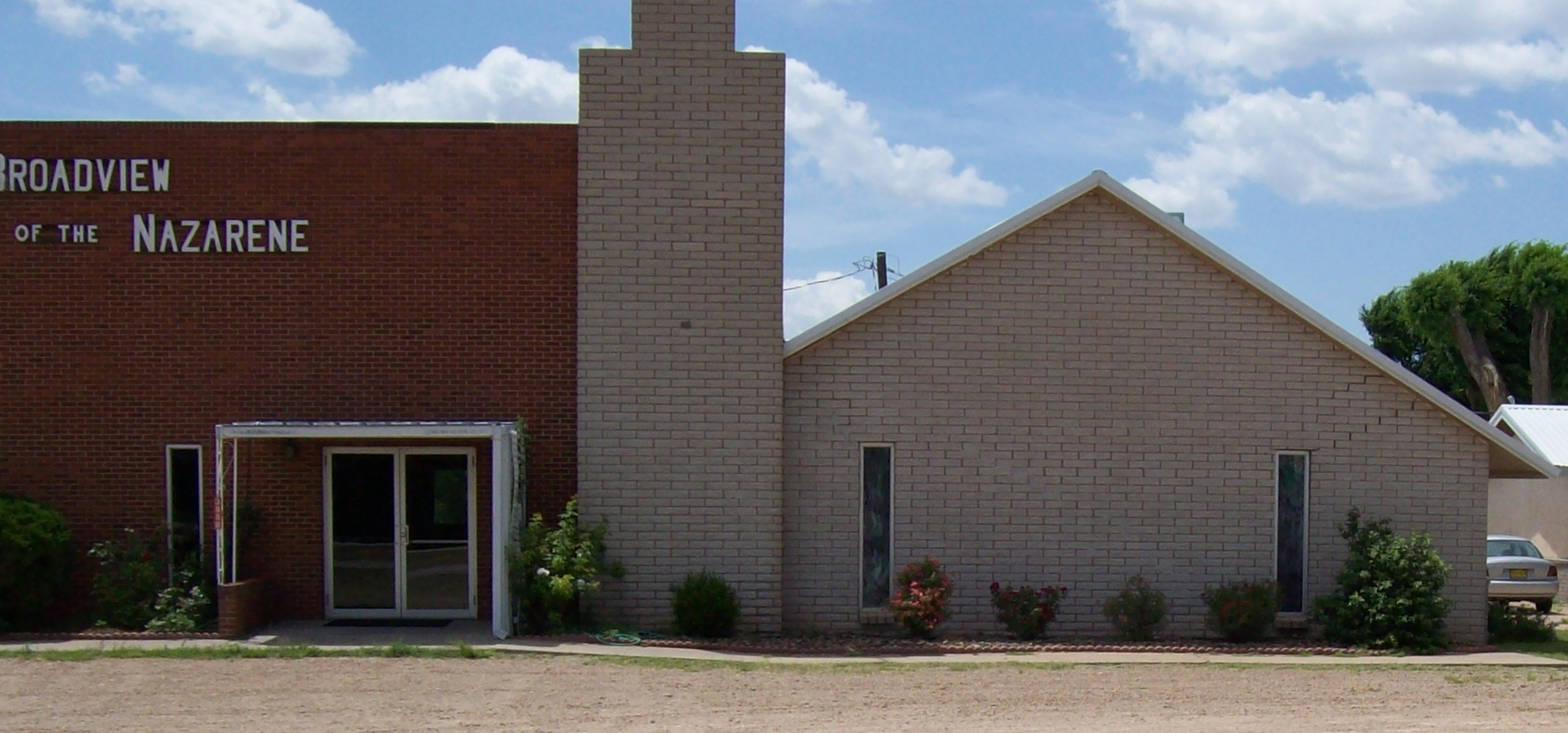

- Location within the state of New Mexico Broadview (the United States)
- Coordinates: 34°49′10″N 103°12′49″W
- Country: United States
- State: New Mexico
- County: Curry
- Elevation: 4,514 ft (1,376 m)
- Time zone: UTC-7 (Mountain (MST))
  - Summer (DST): UTC-6 (MDT)
- ZIP codes: 88112
- Area code: 575
- GNIS feature ID: 886744

Broadview is an unincorporated community located in Curry County, New Mexico, United States. Broadview is located at the junction of state routes 209, 241 and 275, 28.5 miles (45.9 km) north of Clovis. Broadview has a post office with ZIP code 88112.
