= House, New Mexico =

- Village
- Location of House, New Mexico

- Location in the United States
- Coordinates: 34°38′58″N 103°54′14″W
- Country: United States
- State: New Mexico
- County: Quay

Area
  - Total: 0.92 sq mi (2.37 km^{2})
  - Land: 0.92 sq mi (2.37 km^{2})
  - Water: 0 sq mi (0.00 km^{2})
- Elevation: 4,702 ft (1,433 m)

Population (2020)
  - Total: 56
  - Density: 61.3/sq mi (23.66/km^{2})
- Time zone: UTC-7 (Mountain (MST))
  - Summer (DST): UTC-6 (MDT)
- ZIP code: 88121
- Area code: 575
- FIPS code: 35-33710
- GNIS feature ID: 2413560

House is a village in Quay County, New Mexico, United States. The population was 56 at the 2020 census.

== Geography ==
According to the United States Census Bureau, the village has a total area of 0.9 square miles (2.3 km^{2}), all land.

== Demographics ==
Historical population
Census	Pop.	Note	%±
1960	139		—
1970	119		−14.4%
1980	117		−1.7%
1990	85		−27.4%
2000	72		−15.3%
2010	68		−5.6%
2020	56		−17.6%
U.S. Decennial Census

As of the census of 2000, there were 72 people, 34 households, and 21 families residing in the village. The population density was 78.3 inhabitants per square mile (30.2/km^{2}). There were 52 housing units at an average density of 56.5 per square mile (21.8/km^{2}). The racial makeup of the village was 94.44% White, 2.78% from other races, and 2.78% from two or more races. Hispanic or Latino of any race were 6.94% of the population.

There were 34 households, out of which 20.6% had children under the age of 18 living with them, 47.1% were married couples living together, 8.8% had a female householder with no husband present, and 35.3% were non-families. 35.3% of all households were made up of individuals, and 20.6% had someone living alone who was 65 years of age or older. The average household size was 2.12 and the average family size was 2.68.

In the village, the population was spread out, with 20.8% under the age of 18, 2.8% from 18 to 24, 19.4% from 25 to 44, 23.6% from 45 to 64, and 33.3% who were 65 years of age or older. The median age was 52 years. For every 100 females, there were 111.8 males. For every 100 females age 18 and over, there were 111.1 males.

The median income for a household in the village was $25,625, and the median income for a family was $35,000. Males had a median income of $21,250 versus $32,500 for females. The per capita income for the village was $24,300. There were 5.0% of families and 14.3% of the population living below the poverty line, including no under eighteens and none of those over 64.
