= Curry County, New Mexico =

County in New Mexico, United States

- County
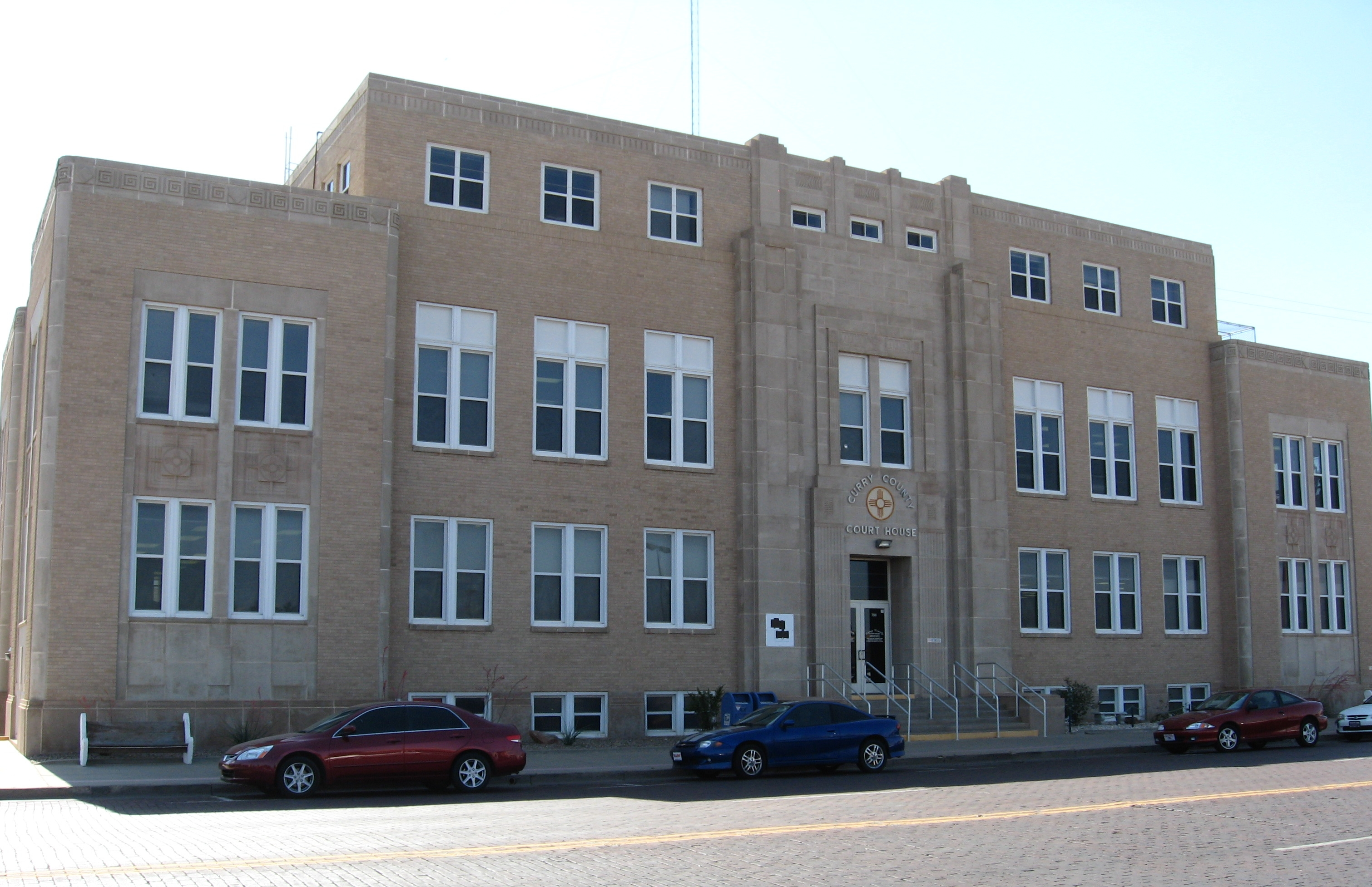
- Curry County Courthouse in Clovis

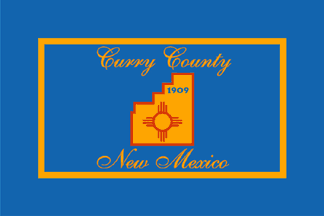
- Flag

- Location within the U.S. state of New Mexico
- Coordinates: 34°34′N 103°21′W
- Country: United States
- State: New Mexico
- Founded: February 25, 1909
- Named for: George Curry
- Seat: Clovis
- Largest city: Clovis

Area
  - Total: 1,408 sq mi (3,650 km^{2})
  - Land: 1,405 sq mi (3,640 km^{2})
  - Water: 3.2 sq mi (8.3 km^{2}) 0.2%

Population (2020)
  - Total: 48,430
  - Estimate (2025): 46,655 ▼
  - Density: 34.5/sq mi (13.3/km^{2})
- Time zone: UTC−7 (Mountain)
  - Summer (DST): UTC−6 (MDT)
- Congressional district: 3rd
- Website: www.currycountynm.gov

Curry County is a county located in the U.S. state of New Mexico. As of the 2020 census, its population was 48,430. Its county seat is Clovis. The county is named in honor of George Curry, territorial governor of New Mexico from 1907 to 1910.

Curry County comprises the Clovis, New Mexico micropolitan statistical area, which is also included in the Clovis–Portales combined statistical area. It is located on the far eastern state line, adjacent to Texas, forming part of the region of Eastern New Mexico.

== Geography ==
According to the U.S. Census Bureau, the county has a total area of 1,408 sq mi (3,650 km^{2}), of which 1,405 square miles (3,640 km^{2}) are land and 3.2 sq mi (8.3 km^{2}) (0.2%) are covered by water. It is the fourth-smallest county in New Mexico by area.

=== Adjacent counties ===
- Quay County - northwest
- Roosevelt County - south
- Bailey County, Texas - southeast
- Parmer County, Texas - east
- Deaf Smith County, Texas - northeast

== Demographics ==
Historical population
Census	Pop.	Note	%±
1910	11,443		—
1920	11,236		−1.8%
1930	15,809		40.7%
1940	18,159		14.9%
1950	23,351		28.6%
1960	32,691		40.0%
1970	39,517		20.9%
1980	42,019		6.3%
1990	42,207		0.4%
2000	45,044		6.7%
2010	48,376		7.4%
2020	48,430		0.1%
2025 (est.)	46,655	▼	−3.7%
U.S. Decennial Census; 1790-1960 1900-1990; 1990-2000 2010

=== 2020 census ===
As of the 2020 census, the county had a population of 48,430. The median age was 32.8 years, with 26.8% of residents under the age of 18 and 13.2% aged 65 or older. For every 100 females there were 102.4 males, and there were 102.0 males for every 100 females age 18 and over.

Curry County, New Mexico – Racial and ethnic composition Note: the US Census treats Hispanic/Latino as an ethnic category. This table excludes Latinos from the racial categories and assigns them to a separate category. Hispanics/Latinos may be of any race.
Race / Ethnicity (NH = Non-Hispanic)	Pop 2000	Pop 2010	Pop 2020	% 2000	% 2010	% 2020
White alone (NH)	26,461	24,545	21,052	58.74%	50.74%	43.47%
Black or African American alone (NH)	2,935	2,774	2,513	6.52%	5.73%	5.19%
Native American or Alaska Native alone (NH)	253	288	249	0.56%	0.60%	0.51%
Asian alone (NH)	780	574	733	1.73%	1.19%	1.51%
Pacific Islander alone (NH)	44	28	35	0.10%	0.06%	0.07%
Other race alone (NH)	55	69	211	0.12%	0.14%	0.44%
Mixed race or Multiracial (NH)	831	981	1,841	1.84%	2.03%	3.80%
Hispanic or Latino (any race)	13,685	19,117	21,796	30.38%	39.52%	45.00%
Total	45,044	48,376	48,430	100.00%	100.00%	100.00%

The racial makeup of the county was 57.7% White, 6.0% Black or African American, 1.3% American Indian and Alaska Native, 1.7% Asian, 0.1% Native Hawaiian and Pacific Islander, 17.0% from some other race, and 16.3% from two or more races. Hispanic or Latino residents of any race comprised 45.0% of the population.

81.2% of residents lived in urban areas, while 18.8% lived in rural areas.

There were 18,563 households in the county, of which 34.5% had children under the age of 18 living with them and 26.8% had a female householder with no spouse or partner present. About 28.3% of all households were made up of individuals and 9.9% had someone living alone who was 65 years of age or older. There were 21,102 housing units, of which 12.0% were vacant. Among occupied housing units, 58.0% were owner-occupied and 42.0% were renter-occupied. The homeowner vacancy rate was 2.6% and the rental vacancy rate was 12.3%.

=== 2010 census ===
As of the 2010 census, 48,376 people, 18,015 households, and 12,341 families were living in the county. The population density was 34.4 inhabitants per square mile (13.3/km^{2}). The 20,062 housing units averaged 14.3/sq mi (5.5/km^{2}). The racial makeup of the county was 69.7% white, 6.3% African American, 1.3% Asian, 1.2% American Indian, 0.1% Pacific Islander, 17.2% from other races, and 4.1% from two or more races. Those of Hispanic or Latino origin made up 39.5% of the population. In terms of ancestry, 11.2% were German, 11.0% were American, 8.0% were Irish, and 6.7% were English.

Of the 18,015 households, 37.8% had children under the age of 18 living with them, 49.0% were married couples living together, 14.2% had a female householder with no husband present, 31.5% were not families, and 26.4% of all households were made up of individuals. The average household size was 2.63, and the average family size was 3.18. The median age was 31.5 years.

The median income for a household in the county was $38,090 and for a family was $48,933. Males had a median income of $35,743 versus $26,585 for females. The per capita income for the county was $19,925. About 15.5% of families and 20.1% of the population were below the poverty line, including 28.9% of those under age 18 and 13.5% of those age 65 or over.

=== 2000 census ===
As of the 2000 census, 45,044 people, 16,766 households, and 11,870 families were living in the county. The population density was 32 people/mi^{2} (12 people/km^{2}). The 19,212 housing units averaged 14 units per square mile (5.4/km^{2}). The racial makeup of the county was 72.40% White, 6.86% African American, 1.00% Native American, 1.78% Asian, 0.13% Pacific Islander, 14.08% from other races, and 3.75% from two or more races. About 30.38% of the population were Hispanic or Latino of any race.

Of the 16,766 households, 38.00% had children under the age of 18 living with them, 54.00% were married couples living together, 12.80% had a female householder with no husband present, and 29.20% were not families. About 25.50% of all households were made up of individuals, and 9.00% had someone living alone who was 65 years of age or older. The average household size was 2.62, and the average family size was 3.15.

In the county, the age distribution was 30.10% under 18, 11.50% from 18 to 24, 28.80% from 25 to 44, 18.10% from 45 to 64, and 11.50% who were 65 or older. The median age was 31 years. For every 100 females, there were 97.60 males. For every 100 females age 18 and over, there were 94.30 males.

The median income for a household in the county was $28,917, and for a family was $33,900. Males had a median income of $25,086 versus $19,523 for females. The per capita income for the county was $15,049. About 15.50% of families and 19.00% of the population were below the poverty line, including 25.10% of those under age 18 and 14.30% of those age 65 or over.

== Communities ==
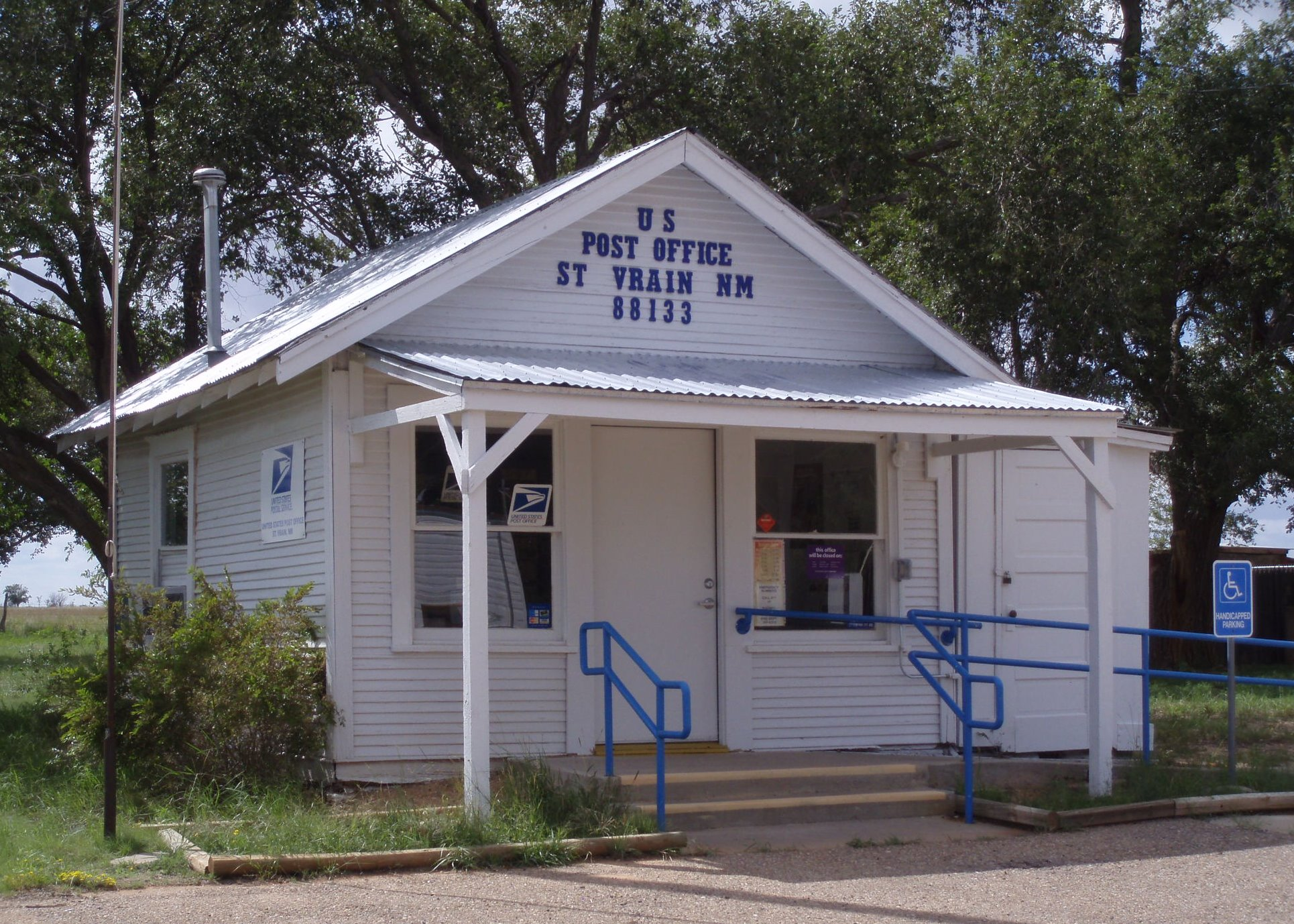
St. Vrain Post Office

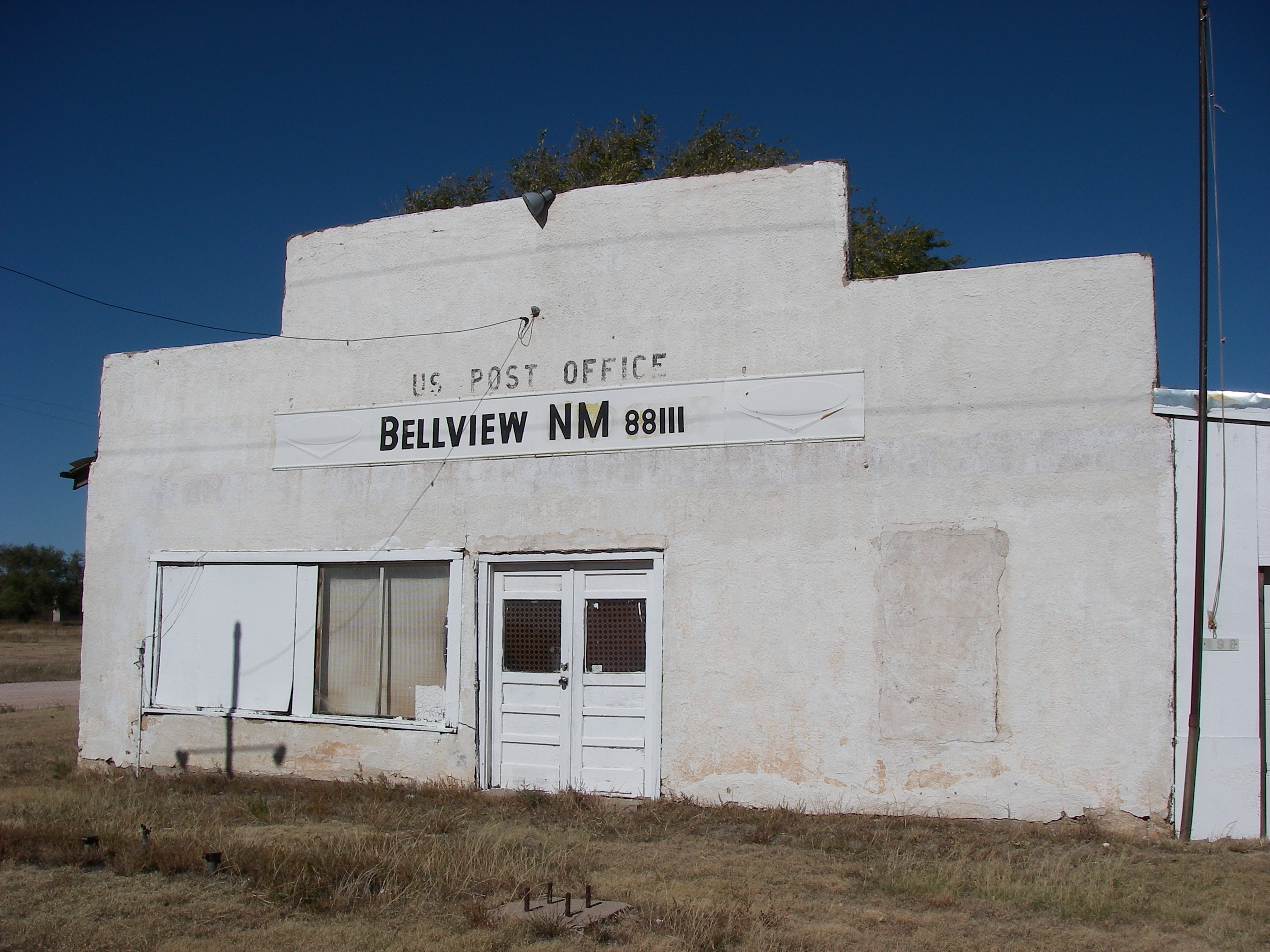
Bellview Post office

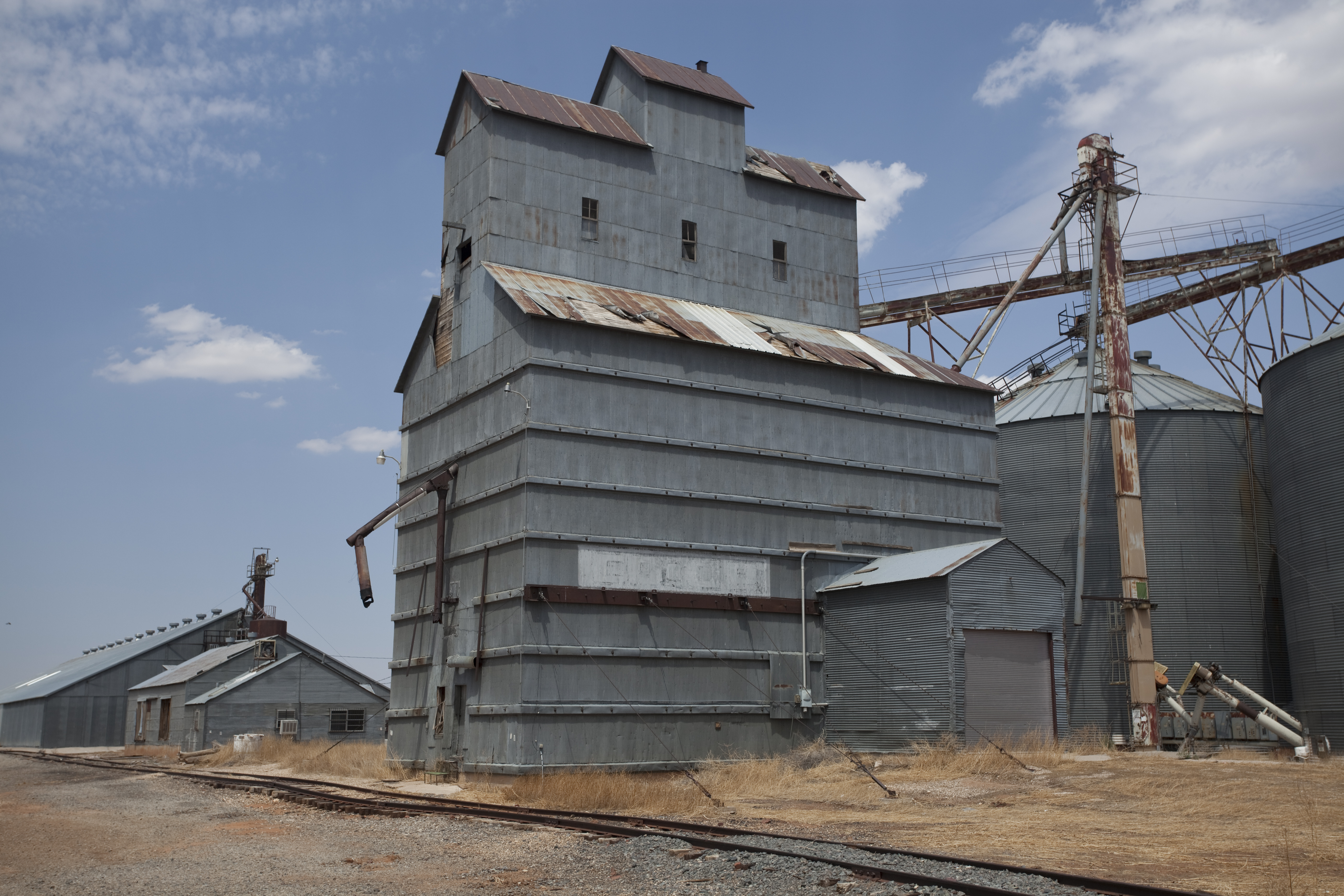
Grier grain elevator

=== Cities ===
- Clovis (county seat)
- Texico

=== Villages ===
- Grady
- Melrose

=== Census-designated place ===
- Cannon AFB

=== Unincorporated communities ===
- Bellview
- Broadview
- Gallaher
- Pleasant Hill
- Portair
- Ranchvale
- St. Vrain

== Politics ==
Like much of Eastern New Mexico, Curry County normally votes conservative, having not voted for a Democrat for President since 1964. However, the county is located in the New Mexico's 3rd congressional district, represented by Democrat Teresa Leger Fernandez.

United States presidential election results for Curry County, New Mexico
Year	Republican		Democratic		Third party(ies)	
Year	No.	%	No.	%	No.	%
1912	123	10.22%	634	52.66%	447	37.13%
1916	355	19.14%	1,175	63.34%	325	17.52%
1920	884	27.81%	2,143	67.41%	152	4.78%
1924	669	20.55%	1,738	53.39%	848	26.05%
1928	1,968	56.16%	1,530	43.66%	6	0.17%
1932	932	18.35%	3,738	73.60%	409	8.05%
1936	1,023	17.65%	4,689	80.89%	85	1.47%
1940	1,629	25.78%	4,670	73.90%	20	0.32%
1944	2,326	41.47%	3,271	58.32%	12	0.21%
1948	2,132	26.85%	5,759	72.52%	50	0.63%
1952	5,023	59.38%	3,422	40.45%	14	0.17%
1956	4,826	57.27%	3,545	42.07%	56	0.66%
1960	6,153	63.83%	3,421	35.49%	65	0.67%
1964	5,120	49.34%	5,228	50.38%	30	0.29%
1968	5,562	53.99%	2,915	28.30%	1,825	17.72%
1972	8,392	75.85%	2,416	21.84%	256	2.31%
1976	6,232	54.87%	5,004	44.06%	122	1.07%
1980	8,132	67.37%	3,622	30.01%	316	2.62%
1984	9,188	74.01%	3,108	25.03%	119	0.96%
1988	8,032	66.17%	3,995	32.91%	111	0.91%
1992	6,831	54.07%	3,699	29.28%	2,103	16.65%
1996	7,378	59.28%	4,116	33.07%	953	7.66%
2000	8,301	69.35%	3,471	29.00%	197	1.65%
2004	10,649	74.54%	3,541	24.79%	96	0.67%
2008	9,599	66.48%	4,670	32.35%	169	1.17%
2012	9,251	67.90%	4,022	29.52%	352	2.58%
2016	9,035	67.58%	3,121	23.34%	1,214	9.08%
2020	10,444	69.16%	4,307	28.52%	350	2.32%
2024	10,714	70.38%	4,230	27.79%	279	1.83%

== Education ==
School districts include:

- Clovis Municipal School District
- Grady Municipal School District
- Melrose Public Schools
- Texico Municipal Schools

== Transportation ==
=== Major highways ===
- US 60 / US 84
- US 70
- NM 19
- NM 77
- NM 89
- NM 108
- NM 209
- NM 224
- NM 241
- NM 245
- NM 267
- NM 268
- NM 275
- NM 288
- NM 289
- NM 311
- NM 348
- NM 467
- NM 469
- NM 523

== See also ==
- National Register of Historic Places listings in Curry County, New Mexico
- USS Curry County (LST-685)
