= Grady, New Mexico =

- Village
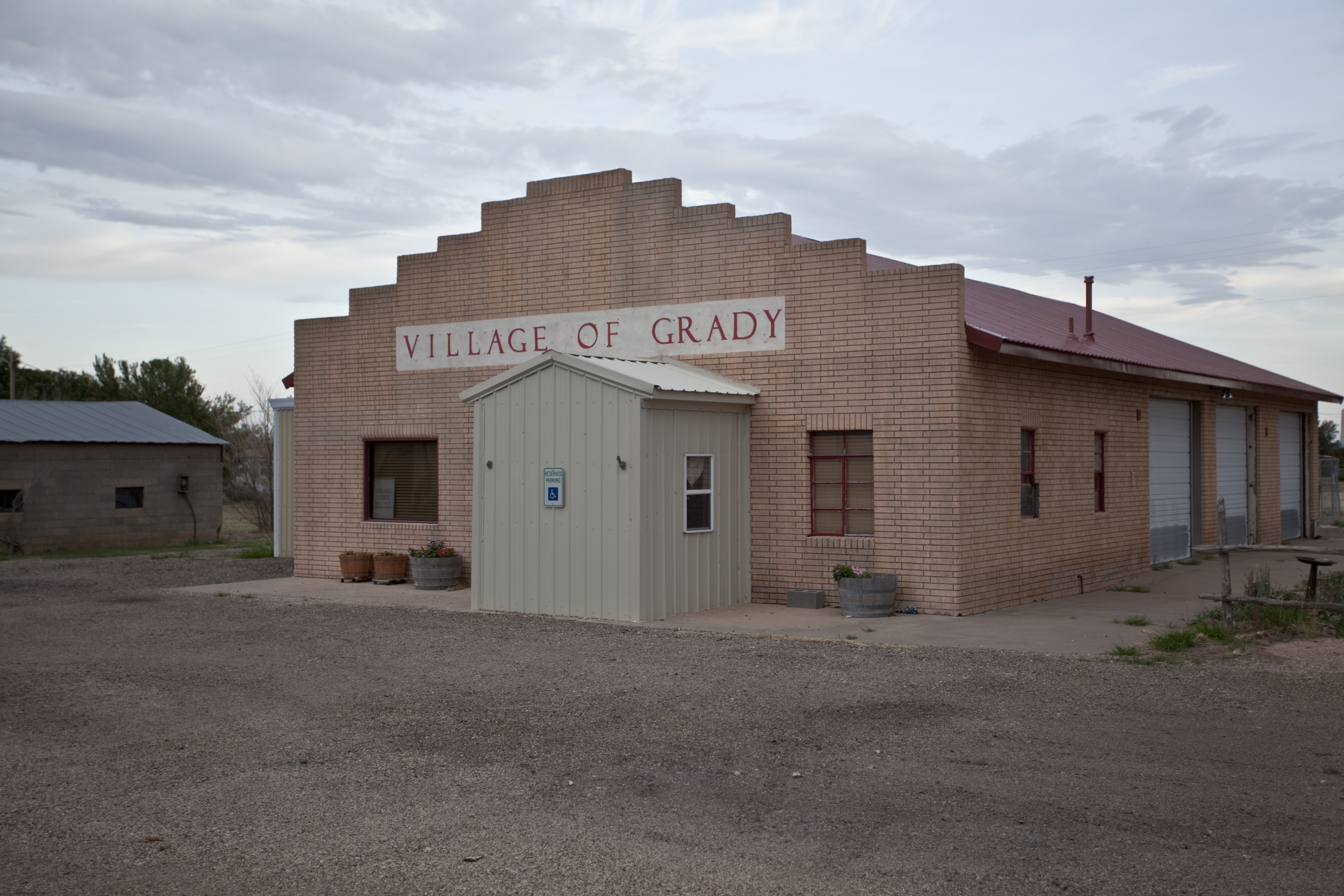
- City Hall, Village of Grady

- Location of Grady, New Mexico

- Location in the United States
- Coordinates: 34°49′18″N 103°18′57″W
- Country: United States
- State: New Mexico
- County: Curry

Area
  - Total: 0.27 sq mi (0.69 km^{2})
  - Land: 0.27 sq mi (0.69 km^{2})
  - Water: 0 sq mi (0.00 km^{2})
- Elevation: 4,600 ft (1,400 m)

Population (2020)
  - Total: 86
  - Density: 323/sq mi (124.7/km^{2})
- Time zone: UTC-7 (Mountain (MST))
  - Summer (DST): UTC-6 (MDT)
- ZIP code: 88120
- Area code: 505
- FIPS code: 35-30210
- GNIS feature ID: 2413554

Grady is a village in Curry County, New Mexico, United States. The population was 86 at the 2020 census.

== Geography ==
Grady is located in Eastern New Mexico in the physiographic region known as the Llano Estacado or Staked Plains.

According to the United States Census Bureau, the village has a total area of 0.2 square miles (0.52 km^{2}), all land.

== History ==
Grady was established in 1907 with a strong community of farming and ranching. The Village was named after Pearl B. Grady, who owned most of the town site. Pearl Grady was also the first postmaster.

Grady was chosen as the pending railroad depot for the Atchison Topeka & Santa Fe Railway (ATSF), but as it turned out, Grady was by-passed.

During Grady's history, the village had a hotel, two grocery stores, a bank, a doctor, a dentist, a drugstore, café, lumber & hardware store and a few other small businesses.

In 1925 a fire consumed the entire south side of the village destroying all of the businesses except the hotel.

In February 1952, a tornado hit Grady, with a number of homes destroyed.

Since the 1960s, the Village of Grady's population has remained close to 100 people and consists mainly of an older population of farmers. The public school is a center piece of Grady, but enrollment continues to decline.

Historical population
| Census | Pop. | Note | %± |
|---|---|---|---|
| 1940 | 237 | | — |
| 1950 | 180 | | −24.1% |
| 1960 | 100 | | −44.4% |
| 1970 | 104 | | 4.0% |
| 1980 | 122 | | 17.3% |
| 1990 | 110 | | −9.8% |
| 2000 | 98 | | −10.9% |
| 2010 | 107 | | 9.2% |
| 2020 | 86 | | −19.6% |
U.S. Decennial Census

== Demographics ==
As of the census of 2000, there were 98 people, 38 households, and 28 families residing in the village. The population density was 395.2 inhabitants per square mile (152.6/km^{2}). There were 48 housing units at an average density of 193.6 per square mile (74.7/km^{2}). The racial makeup of the village was 90.82% White, 7.14% from other races, and 2.04% from two or more races. Hispanic or Latino of any race were 10.20% of the population.

There were 38 households, out of which 34.2% had children under the age of 18 living with them, 65.8% were married couples living together, 7.9% had a female householder with no husband present, and 26.3% were non-families. 23.7% of all households were made up of individuals, and 18.4% had someone living alone who was 65 years of age or older. The average household size was 2.58 and the average family size was 3.07.

In the village, the population was spread out, with 28.6% under the age of 18, 4.1% from 18 to 24, 29.6% from 25 to 44, 21.4% from 45 to 64, and 16.3% who were 65 years of age or older. The median age was 38 years. For every 100 females, there were 71.9 males. For every 100 females age 18 and over, there were 70.7 males.

The median income for a household in the village was $26,250, and the median income for a family was $33,333. Males had a median income of $33,750 versus $26,250 for females. The per capita income for the village was $13,000. About 8.3% of families and 12.5% of the population were below the poverty line, including 37.5% of those under age 18 and 0.0% of those age 65 or over.

== Education ==
The Grady Municipal School District operates the schools in the village.

== See also ==
- List of municipalities in New Mexico
