= National Register of Historic Places listings in Roosevelt County, New Mexico =

Location of Roosevelt County in New Mexico

This is a list of the National Register of Historic Places listings in Roosevelt County, New Mexico.

This is intended to be a complete list of the properties and districts on the National Register of Historic Places in Roosevelt County, New Mexico, United States. Latitude and longitude coordinates are provided for many National Register properties and districts; these locations may be seen together in a map.

There are 7 properties listed on the National Register in the county, including 1 National Historic Landmark.

This National Park Service list is complete through NPS recent listings posted May 23, 2025.

Contents: NRHP in New Mexico by county
Bernalillo – Catron – Chaves – Cibola – Colfax – Curry – De Baca – Doña Ana – Eddy – Grant – Guadalupe – Harding – Hidalgo – Lea – Lincoln – Los Alamos – Luna – McKinley – Mora – Otero – Quay – Rio Arriba – Roosevelt – San Juan – San Miguel – Sandoval – Santa Fe – Sierra – Socorro – Taos – Torrance – Union – Valencia

== Current listings ==
	Name on the Register	Image	Date listed	Location	City or town	Description
1	Administration Building	Administration Building	September 22, 1988 (#88001558)	Southern side of University Pl. and campus green, Eastern New Mexico University; 34°10′44″N 103°20′53″W	Portales	New Mexico State Register of Cultural Properties (SRCP)
2	Anderson Basin	Anderson Basin	October 15, 1966 (#66000483)	New Mexico Highway 467, about 5 miles north of U.S. Highway 70; 34°16′35″N 103°19′11″W	Clovis	
3	Bank of Portales	Bank of Portales	December 27, 1984 (#84000635)	Near First and Main; 34°11′13″N 103°20′15″W	Portales	SRCP
4	Davis Mercantile	Davis Mercantile	December 14, 2018 (#100003218)	4610 NM 206; 33°38′34″N 103°20′24″W	Milnesand	
5	Midway Service Station	Midway Service Station	January 12, 2005 (#04001479)	38797 U.S. Highway 70; 33°50′31″N 103°46′20″W	Kenna	SRCP
6	Roosevelt County Courthouse	Roosevelt County Courthouse	December 3, 2008 (#08001136)	100 W. 2nd St. 34°11′09″N 103°20′11″W	Portales	SRCP
7	US Post Office-Portales Main	US Post Office-Portales Main	February 23, 1990 (#90000140)	116 W. 1st St. 34°11′11″N 103°20′17″W	Portales	

== See also ==
- List of National Historic Landmarks in New Mexico
- National Register of Historic Places listings in New Mexico
