= New Mexico State Road 114 =

Highway in New Mexico

State Road 114

Route information
- Maintained by NMDOT
- Length: 47.054 mi (75.726 km)

Major junctions
- West end: US 70 / NM 330 in Elida
- NM 206 in Dora
- East end: SH 114 at the Texas state line near Lingo

Location
- Country: United States
- State: New Mexico
- Counties: Roosevelt

Highway system
- New Mexico State Highway System; Interstate; US; State; Scenic
← NM 113	→ NM 115

New Mexico State Road 114 (NM 114) is a 47.054 mi (75.7 km) state highway in Roosevelt County, New Mexico.

== Route description ==
NM 114 begins at an intersection with U.S. Route 70 (US 70) and NM 330 in Elida. The highway travels in a southern direction along the town's eastern edge and turns east at County Road 22 and leaves the town. The highway travels through largely rural areas and runs through the town of Dora, intersecting NM 206. NM 114 turns back south at County Road F and runs through Causey, intersecting with NM 321 and NM 458. The highway turns back east at County Road E south of Lingo. NM 114 ends at the Texas state line, with the highway continuing into Texas as SH 114.

== Major intersections ==
The entire route is in Roosevelt County.

Location	mi	km	Destinations	Notes
Elida	0.000	0.000	US 70 / NM 330 north – Portales, Roswell, Melrose	Western terminus, southern terminus of NM 330
Dora	18.633	29.987	NM 206 – Portales, Tatum	
Causey	34.635	55.740	NM 321 east – Littlefield	Western terminus of NM 321
Causey	36.715	59.087	NM 458 west	Eastern terminus of NM 458
	47.054	75.726	SH 114 east – Morton	State line; continuation into Texas
1.000 mi = 1.609 km; 1.000 km = 0.621 mi
