= New Mexico State Road 125 =

State highway in New Mexico, United States

State Road 125
- NM 125 highlighted in red

Route information
- Maintained by NMDOT
- Length: 25.412 mi (40.897 km)
- Existed: 1950s–present

Major junctions
- South end: US 380 east of Tatum
- NM 508
- North end: SH 125 at the Texas state line near Bledsoe, TX

Location
- Country: United States
- State: New Mexico
- Counties: Lea

Highway system
- New Mexico State Highway System; Interstate; US; State; Scenic
← NM 124	→ NM 126

State Road 125 (NM 125) is a state highway in the U.S. state of New Mexico maintained by the New Mexico Department of Transportation (NMDOT). The 25-mile (40 km) road, located entirely within Lea County, begins at US 380 near Tatum and ends at the Texas state line where the road meets the numerically continuous Texas State Highway 125 southwest of Bledsoe, TX. The road also has a major intersection with NM 508.

== Route description ==
NM 125 begins at US 380 approximately 5 miles (8 km) east of Tatum. The road proceeds to the north and then the northeast before NM 508 branches off to the west toward Crossroads. The road continues to the northeast to the state line and SH 125. NM 125 passes through mostly agricultural lands and oil and gas fields across the largely flat and featureless terrain of the Llano Estacado.

== History ==
NM 125 was created sometime after 1941 probably in the early 1950s as Texas began the uncommon process of unofficially signing SH 125's predecessor route, Farm to Market Road 769, as a numerically continuous state highway in 1955.

== Major intersections ==
The entire route is in Lea County.

Location	mi	km	Destinations	Notes
	0.000	0.000	US 380 – Tatum, Gladiola	Southern terminus
	22.900	36.854	NM 508 west – Crossroads	Eastern terminus of NM 508
	25.412	40.897	SH 125 – Bledsoe, TX	Continuation north as SH 125
1.000 mi = 1.609 km; 1.000 km = 0.621 mi
