= Crossroads, New Mexico =

- Unincorporated community
- Location in New Mexico Location in the United States
- Coordinates: 33°30′44″N 103°20′23″W
- Country: United States
- State: New Mexico
- County: Lea
- Elevation: 4,121 ft (1,256 m)
- Time zone: UTC-7 (Mountain (MST))
  - Summer (DST): UTC-6 (MDT)
- ZIP codes: 88114
- Area code: 575
- GNIS feature ID: 888099

Crossroads is an unincorporated community located in Lea County, New Mexico, United States. The community is located at the junction of state roads 206 and 508, 17.7 miles (28.5 km) north of Tatum. Crossroads had its own post office until April 29, 1995; it still has its own ZIP code, 88114.

== Notable person ==
- Anna Crook, member of the New Mexico House of Representatives, was born in Crossroads
