= KICA-FM =

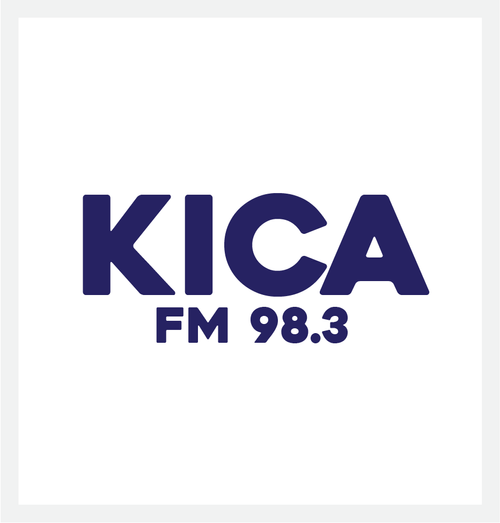

Farwell, Texas; United States
- Broadcast area: Clovis, New Mexico
- Frequency: 98.3 MHz
- Branding: La Caliente 98.3

Programming
- Format: Defunct (was Regional Mexican)

Ownership
- Owner: HPRN Networks, LLP
- Sister stations: KGRW, KKNM

History
- First air date: September 15, 1984
- Last air date: July 23, 2023
- Former call signs: KLZK (1984–1991)

Technical information
- Licensing authority: FCC
- Facility ID: 61578
- Class: C1
- ERP: 51,000 watts
- HAAT: 53 meters (174 ft)
- Transmitter coordinates: 34°24′31.2″N 103°11′16.8″W

Links
- Public license information: Public file; LMS
- Website: www.hpr.network/texas

KICA-FM (98.3 MHz, "La Caliente 98.3") was a radio station last broadcasting a Regional Mexican format. Licensed to Farwell, Texas, United States, and serving the Clovis-Portales CSA, the station was last owned by HPRN Networks, LLP.

== History ==
The station went on the air as KLZK on September 15, 1984. On June 14, 1991, the station changed its call sign to KICA-FM.

After KLZK went off the air, the station was re-launched in 1991 under the KICA-FM call sign under the moniker of K-Classic 98.3; initially operating out of studios in Muleshoe, Texas, where it was co-located with Southwestern Entertainment Group sister stations KMUL and KMUL-FM. The original on-air lineup was Ray Don Stanton (who also doubled as KMUL's morning man), former KZZO jock Bryan Daniels and night guy Jeff Gardiner. By 1992, the station had moved to studios at 1000 Sycamore, across from Hillcrest Park, in Clovis. That site also became the home to Spanish-language station KICA (980 AM), and eventually country station KKYC, which simulcast with KMUL-FM. The station group would be eventually sold to Tallgrass Broadcasting, which would later go into receivership and take the stations dark.

Years later, the aired a rock format as K98 and a contemporary hit radio format as "Fun 98.3".

KICA-FM went silent on May 30, 2020, due to transmitter site damage caused by lightning. On March 12, 2024, the license was cancelled by the FCC, due to the station having been silent since December 31, 2022.
