= New Mexico State Road 458 =

State highway in New Mexico, United States

State Road 458

Route information
- Maintained by NMDOT
- Length: 12.048 mi (19.389 km)

Major junctions
- West end: NM 206 near Pep
- East end: NM 114 near Causey

Location
- Country: United States
- State: New Mexico
- Counties: Roosevelt

Highway system
- New Mexico State Highway System; Interstate; US; State; Scenic
← NM 457	→ NM 460

State Road 458 (NM 458) is a 12.048-mile-long (19.389 km) state highway in the US state of New Mexico. NM 458's western terminus is at NM 206 north of Pep, and the eastern terminus is at NM 114 south of Causey.

== Major intersections ==
The entire route is in Roosevelt County.

Location	mi	km	Destinations	Notes
	0.000	0.000	NM 206	Western terminus
	12.048	19.389	NM 114	Eastern terminus
1.000 mi = 1.609 km; 1.000 km = 0.621 mi
