= KICA =

KICA may refer to:

- KICA (AM), a defunct radio station (980 AM) formerly licensed to serve Clovis, New Mexico, United States
- KICA-FM, a defunct radio station (98.3 FM) formerly licensed to serve Farwell, Texas, United States

== See also ==
- Kıca, Silifke
