= KMUL =

KMUL may refer to:

- KMUL-FM, a radio station (103.1 FM) licensed to Muleshoe, Texas, United States
- KMUL (AM), a defunct radio station (830 AM) formerly licensed to Farwell, Texas
