= U.S. Route 82 in New Mexico =

Highway in New Mexico

U.S. Highway 82
- US 82 highlighted in red

Route information
- Maintained by NMDOT
- Length: 192.557 mi (309.890 km)
- Existed: November 26, 1960–present

Major junctions
- West end: US 54 / US 70 in Alamogordo
- US 285 in Artesia; NM 206 in Lovington
- East end: US 82 at the Texas state line near Lovington

Location
- Country: United States
- State: New Mexico
- Counties: Otero, Chaves, Eddy, Lea

Highway system
- United States Numbered Highway System; List; Special; Divided; New Mexico State Highway System; Interstate; US; State; Scenic
← NM 81	→ NM 83

U.S. Route 82 (US 82) is a part of the U.S. Highway System that travels from Alamogordo, New Mexico, east to Brunswick, Georgia. In the U.S. state of New Mexico, US 82 extends from Alamogordo and ends at the Texas state line northeast of Lovington.

== Route description ==
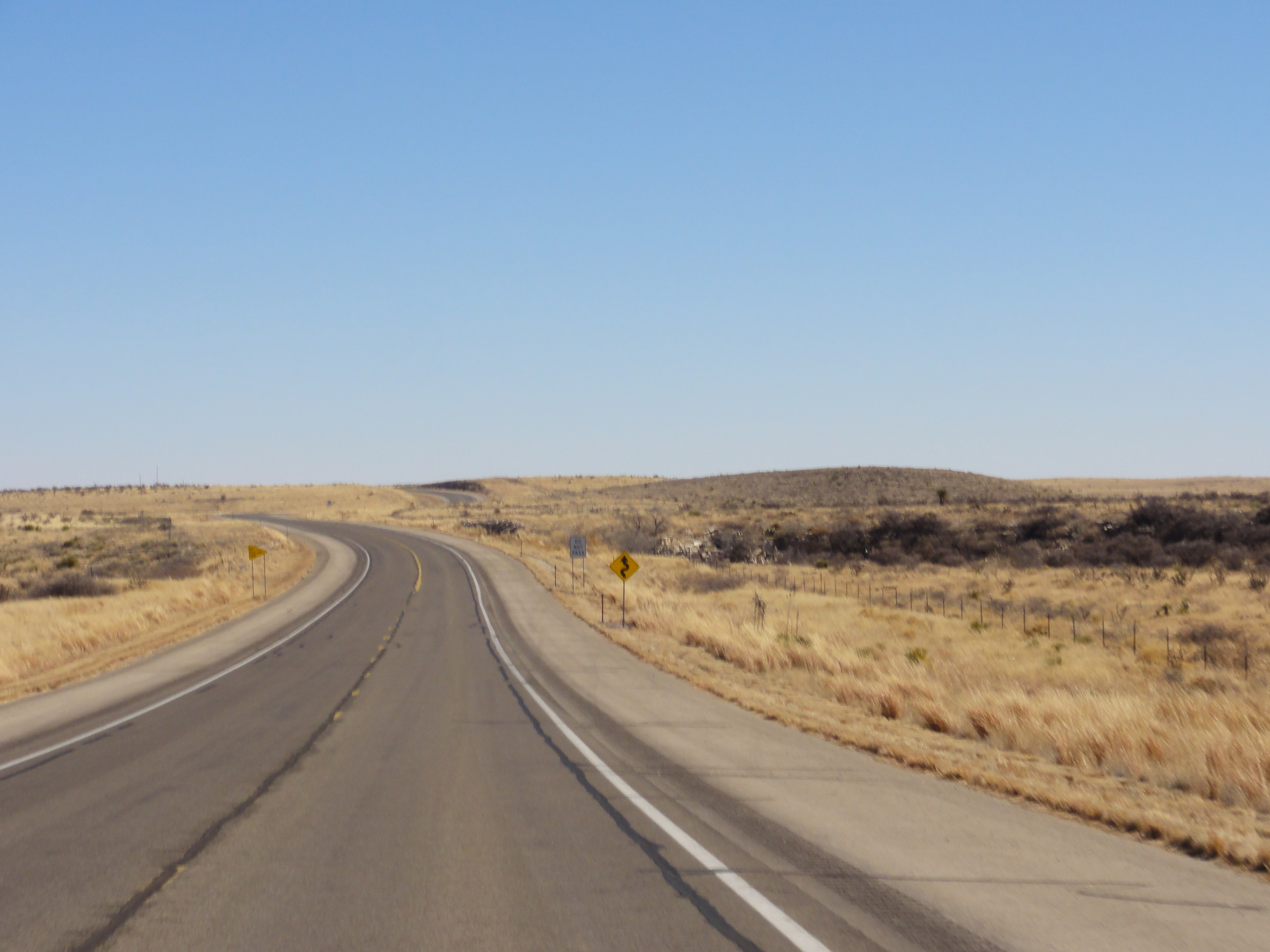
US 82 slightly west of Hope

US 82 begins at an intersection with US highways 54 and 70 north of Alamogordo, and south of La Luz, New Mexico. Heading east out of Alamogordo the road quickly goes up into the Sacramento Mountains, traveling through the Lincoln National Forest. While climbing the steep Mexican Canyon, the highway passes the abandoned railroad trestles of the El Paso and Northeastern Railway, and passes through the only currently used road tunnel in New Mexico. The road then traverses the New Mexico villages of High Rolls, Cloudcroft, and Mayhill. After descending the mountains into the flat plains of eastern New Mexico, it generally follows a north-northeasterly bearing until Artesia, where it takes a more due-easterly bearing on through to Lovington, veering back slightly to the north before crossing into Texas.

== Major intersections ==
County	Location	mi	km	Destinations	Notes
Otero	Alamogordo	0.000	0.000	US 54 / US 70 / Business Route – Las Cruces, Alamogordo, Tularosa, El Paso	Western terminus
Otero	Cloudcroft	16.209	26.086	NM 130 east – Sunspot, Weed	Western terminus of NM 130
Otero	Cloudcroft	17.600	28.324	NM 244 north – Silver Lake, Mescalero, Ruidoso	Southern terminus of NM 244
Otero	Mayhill	34.674	55.802	NM 130 west (Rio Penasco Road) – Weed, Sacramento	Eastern terminus of NM 130
Chaves		58.900	94.790	NM 24 north – Dunken	Southern terminus of NM 24
Chaves		73.900	118.931	NM 13 north – Hagerman, Roswell	Southern terminus of NM 13
Eddy	Artesia	107.461	172.942	US 285 (1st Street)	
Eddy		110.733	178.207	NM 229 (Haldeman Road) to US 285	
Eddy		121.246	195.127	NM 360 south (Bluestern Road) – Potash Mines	Northern terminus of NM 360
Eddy		138.961	223.636	NM 529 east – Hobbs	Western terminus of NM 529
Lea		147.511	237.396	NM 249 west – Hagerman, Caprock	Eastern terminus of NM 249
Lea		163.091	262.470	NM 457 north	Southern terminus of NM 457
Lea	Duran	164.974	265.500	NM 238 south	Northern terminus of NM 238
Lea	Lovington	171.049	275.277	US 82 Truck (17th Street)	
Lea	Lovington	172.195	277.121	NM 18 south / NM 83 east	Northern terminus of NM 18; western terminus of NM 83
Lea	Lovington	173.795	279.696	US 82 Truck (Dearduff Drive)	Access to Nor–Lea Hospital District
Lea		176.332	283.779	NM 206 north – Tatum	Interchange; southern terminus of NM 206
Lea		192.557	309.890	US 82 east – Plains	Continuation into Texas
1.000 mi = 1.609 km; 1.000 km = 0.621 mi

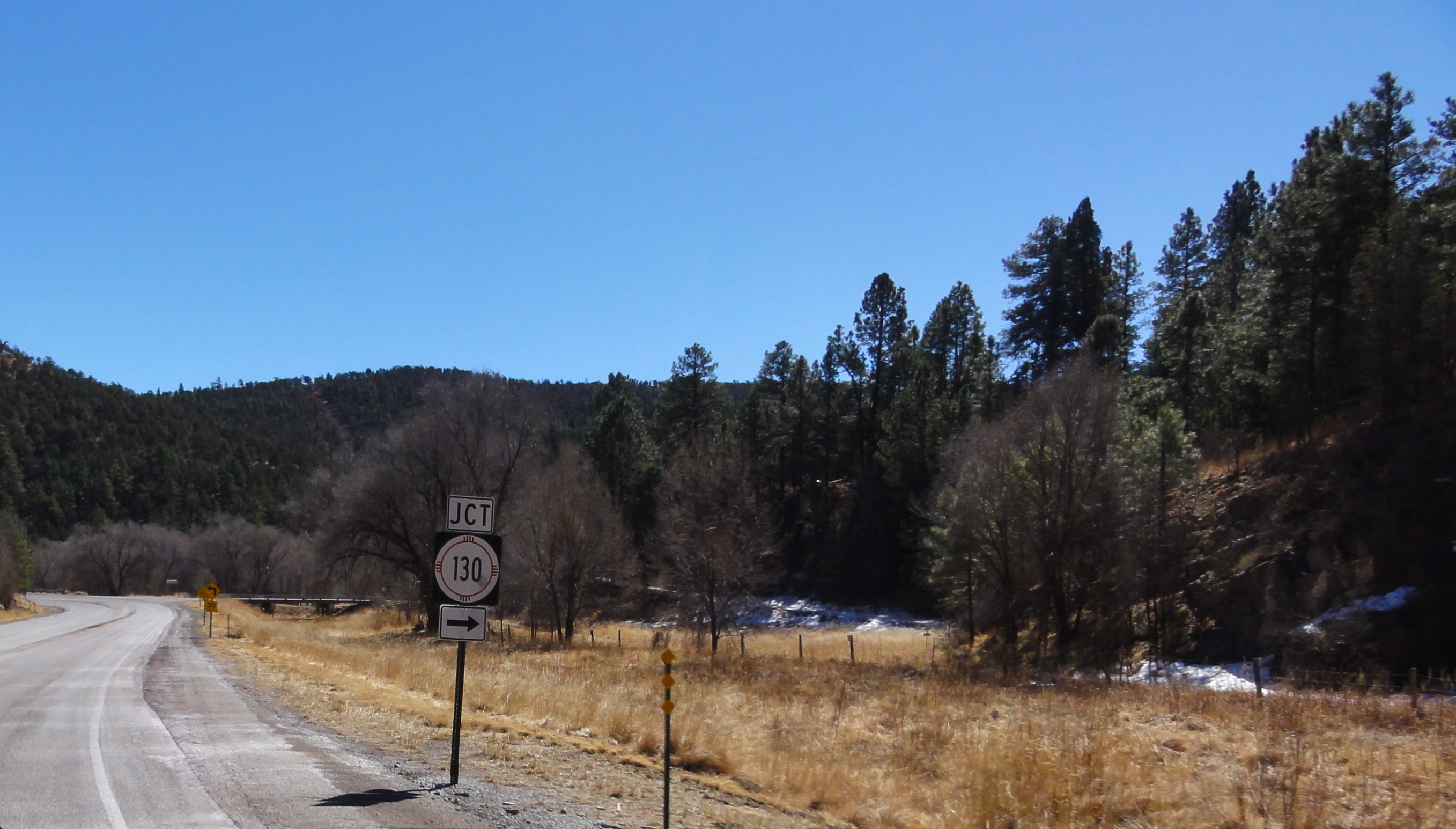
US 82 approaching junction with NM 130 in Mayhill

U.S. Route 82
Previous state: Terminus	New Mexico	Next state: Texas
