= Rogers, New Mexico =

Unincorporated community in New Mexico, United States

Rogers
- Unincorporated community
- Location within the state of New Mexico Rogers (the United States)
- Coordinates: 33°58′54″N 103°13′50″W
- Country: United States
- State: New Mexico
- County: Roosevelt
- Elevation: 4,226 ft (1,288 m)
- Time zone: UTC-7 (Mountain (MST))
  - Summer (DST): UTC-6 (MDT)
- ZIP codes: 88132
- Area code: 575
- GNIS feature ID: 894127

Rogers is an unincorporated community in Roosevelt County, New Mexico, United States. The community is on New Mexico State Road 235, 6.8 miles (10.9 km) east-northeast of Dora. Rogers has a post office with ZIP code 88132.
