= KMUL-FM =

- Muleshoe, Texas; United States
- Frequency: 103.1 MHz

Programming
- Format: Country music

Ownership
- Owner: Tallgrass Broadcasting
- Sister stations: KMUL (AM)

History
- First air date: February 1966
- Last air date: April 30, 2012
- Call sign meaning: Mule (allusion to the town and school mascot)

Technical information
- Licensing authority: FCC
- Facility ID: 61586
- Class: A
- ERP: 6,000 watts
- HAAT: 22.9 meters (75 ft)
- Transmitter coordinates: 34°13′39.2″N 102°44′11.7″W

Links
- Public license information: Public file; LMS

KMUL-FM (103.1 FM) was a radio station in Muleshoe, Texas, United States. It broadcast from 1966 to 2012 and was last owned by Tallgrass Broadcasting.

== History ==
John Burroughs, Leola Randolph, and Gilbert Lamb, the owners of KMUL AM, filed with the Federal Communications Commission on July 28, 1964, to build an FM radio station in Muleshoe. The Federal Communications Commission (FCC) approved the application on June 16, 1965, and a license to cover was requested in February 1966.

In 2007, the KMUL stations were acquired by Tallgrass Broadcasting, which owned KICA-AM-FM and KKYC serving Clovis, New Mexico. One of the owners in Tallgrass was former TV news anchor and documentarian Bill Kurtis. Tallgrass went into receivership in 2010 after ceasing to pay a loan.

KMUL-FM was taken silent by its receiver on May 1, 2012, for financial reasons. On April 17, 2013, Tallgrass surrendered the broadcast license and informed the FCC that it had no intention to reactivate the facility.
