= New Mexico State Road 244 =

State highway in Otero County, New Mexico, United States

State Road 244
- NM 244 highlighted in red

Route information
- Maintained by NMDOT
- Length: 29.435 mi (47.371 km)
- Existed: 1988–present

Major junctions
- South end: US 82 in Cloudcroft
- North end: US 70 northeast of Mescalero

Location
- Country: United States
- State: New Mexico
- Counties: Otero

Highway system
- New Mexico State Highway System; Interstate; US; State; Scenic
← NM 243	→ NM 245

State Road 244 (NM 244) is a 29.435-mile (47.371 km) state highway in northern Otero County, New Mexico, United States, that connects U.S. Route 82 (US 82) in Cloudcroft with U.S. Route 70 (US 70) northeast of Mescalero.

== Route description ==
NM 244 begins at a T intersection on US 82 in the Lincoln National Forest in a narrow part of city limits of Cloudcroft that runs along US 82 and connects the main part of the village with the ski area to the east. (US 82 heads west toward Alamogordo and Tularosa and east toward Mayhill and Artesia.) From its southern terminus NM 244 heads northerly for about 1.3 miles (2.1 km), connecting with west ends of Osha Trail Road and County Road 568 along the way. NM 244 then turns to head east–northeasterly. Along this roughly 4.8-mile (7.7 km) section, NM 244 connects with the south end of Observatory Road, the north end of Lincoln Forest Winter Skik, the south ends of La Luz Canyon and Raspberry roads, the north end of Sacramento Mountain Road, the south end of Big Rood Road, and the north end of County Road 7 (Dry Canyon Road), which heads south to end at US 82 in Twin Forks.

Immediately after Dry Canyon Road, NM 244, leaves Lincoln National Forest, enters the Mescalero Apache Reservation, and connects with the southern end of Indian Service Road 10 (which heads north–northwesterly to connect with the north end of Indian Service Route 26, before ending at US 70 in Mescalero). As NM 244 continues its northeasterly direction, it begins running roughly parallel with and near the north bank of the Silver Springs Creek for about 2.3 miles (3.7 km) before connecting with the north end of Baird Canyon Road and passing just south of Silver Lake. Approximately 5.1 miles (8.2 km) northeast of Silver Lake, NM 244 turns to head northwest as it connects with the west end of Indian Service Route Route 2; Silver Springs Creek continues flowing northeast. After heading about 2.1 miles (3.4 km) to the northwest, NM 244 connects with the west end of Indian Service Route 26 (which heads southwesterly to connect with Indian Service Route 27 before ending at Indian Service Route 10). Roughly 2.5 miles (4.0 km) farther along its northwesterly course, NM 244 connects with the west end of Indian Service Route 14 and, promptly thereafter, the east end of Indian Service Route 27 (which heads southwesterly to end at Indian Service Route 26). About 2 miles (3.2 km) later, NM 244, connects with the east end of Indian Service Road 51, and then, approximately one-half mile (0.80 km) later, connects with the east end of Indian Service Road 16. Following a more north–northwesterly course, and after about 1.7 miles (2.7 km), NM 244 connects with the south end of Indian Service Road 34 (which heads northerly to connect with the south end of Indian Service Road 49 before ending at Indian Service Road 15). Roughly 1.6 miles (2.6 km) farther along, NM 244 connects with the south end of Indian Service Route 80, followed by the north end of Indian Service Road 49 (which heads southerly to end at Indian Service Road 16). About another mile (0.8 km) on, NM 244 connects with the west end of Indian Service Road 15 (which heads easterly to connect with the north end of Indian Service Road 34 and beyond). After approximately another 2.8 miles (4.5 km), NM 244 connects with the north end of Skyline Road and then with the south end of Sanspear Drive 0.6 miles (0.97 km) later. About another 0.6 miles (0.97 km) east of that intersection, NM 244 reaches its northern terminus at a T intersection with US 70, roughly 4.7 miles (7.6 km) northeast of Mescalero. (US 70 heads east toward Ruidoso Downs, Glencoe, and Roswell and west toward Mescalero, Bent, and Tularosa.)

== Traffic ==
Annual average daily traffic history (Note: Annual average daily traffic history reflects the highest reported traffic for all sections of the highway. The section with highest reported traffic may vary from year to year and may be affected by additions to and deletions from the highway, as well as highway realignments.)

Annual average daily traffic
Year	AADT
2020	
2019	
2018	
2017	
2016	
2015	574
2014	715
2013	715

The New Mexico Department of Transportation (NMDOT) collects data for the State Roads and Local Federal-Aid roads. Traffic is measured in both directions and reported as Annual Average Daily Traffic (AADT). As of 2015, NM 244 had an AADT of 574, with a nearly 20 percent decrease over the previous two years.

== History ==
NM 244 was created in 1988 as a renumbering of a section of New Mexico State Road 24, along with the renumbering of many other state road sections in the same year.

== Major intersections ==
The entire route is in Otero County.

Location	mi	km	Destinations	Notes
Cloudcroft	0.000	0.000	US 82 west – Alamogordo, Tularosa US 82 east – Mayhill, Artesia	Southern terminus; T intersection
	29.435	47.371	US 70 east – Ruidoso Downs, Glencoe, Roswell US 70 west – Mescalero, Bent, Tularosa	Northern terminus; T intersection
1.000 mi = 1.609 km; 1.000 km = 0.621 mi

== See also ==
- List of state roads in New Mexico
