= List of metropolitan areas in New Mexico =

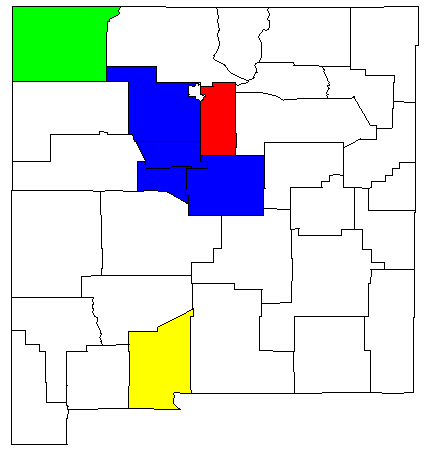
Metropolitan areas of New Mexico. Albuquerque MSA Farmington MSA Las Cruces MSA Santa Fe MSA

The State of New Mexico has a total of four metropolitan statistical areas (MSAs) that are fully or partially located in the state. 7 of the state's 33 counties are classified by the United States Census Bureau as metropolitan. As of the 2000 census, these counties had a combined population 1,147,424 (63.1% of the state's total population). Based on a July 1, 2009 population estimate, that figure rose to 1,335,985 (66.5% of the state's total population).

== Metropolitan areas ==
- Albuquerque MSA
  - Bernalillo County
  - Sandoval County
  - Torrance County
  - Valencia County
- Farmington MSA
  - San Juan County
- Las Cruces MSA
  - Doña Ana County
- Santa Fe MSA
  - Santa Fe County

=== Population statistics ===
Metropolitan Statistical Area	2010 Population	2000 Population	Percent Change (2000–2010)
Albuquerque MSA	887,077	729,649	21.58%
Farmington MSA	130,004	113,801	14.24%
Las Cruces MSA	209,233	174,682	19.78%
Santa Fe MSA	144,170	129,292	11.51%

== Combined Statistical Areas ==
Combined statistical areas of New Mexico. Albuquerque-Santa Fe-Las Vegas CSA Clovis-Portales CSA El Paso-Las Cruces CSA

The United States Census Bureau defines a Combined Statistical Area (CSA) as an aggregate of adjacent Core Based Statistical Areas (CBSAs) that are linked by commuting ties. There are three combined statistical areas in New Mexico, with one crossing into Texas.

- Albuquerque-Santa Fe-Las Vegas CSA
  - Albuquerque Metropolitan Statistical Area
    - Bernalillo County
    - Sandoval County
    - Torrance County
    - Valencia County
  - Santa Fe Metropolitan Statistical Area
    - Santa Fe County
  - Las Vegas Micropolitan Statistical Area
    - San Miguel County
  - Espanola Micropolitan Statistical Area
    - Rio Arriba County
  - Grants Micropolitan Statistical Area
    - Cibola County
  - Los Alamos Micropolitan Statistical Area
    - Los Alamos County
- El Paso-Las Cruces CSA
  - El Paso Metropolitan Statistical Area
    - El Paso County, Texas
    - Hudspeth County, Texas
  - Las Cruces Metropolitan Statistical Area
    - Doña Ana County, New Mexico
- Clovis-Portales CSA
  - Clovis Micropolitan Statistical Area
    - Curry County
  - Portales Micropolitan Statistical Area
    - Roosevelt County

=== Population statistics ===
Combined Statistical Area	2010 Population
Albuquerque-Santa Fe-Las Vegas CSA	1,146,049
Clovis-Portales CSA	63,224
El Paso-Las Cruces CSA	1,013,356

== See also ==
- List of micropolitan areas in New Mexico
- List of cities in New Mexico
- New Mexico census statistical areas
- Table of United States primary census statistical areas (PCSA)
- Table of United States Combined Statistical Areas (CSA)
- Table of United States Metropolitan Statistical Areas (MSA)
- Table of United States Micropolitan Statistical Areas (μSA)
