= Davis Mercantile =

- U.S. National Register of Historic Places
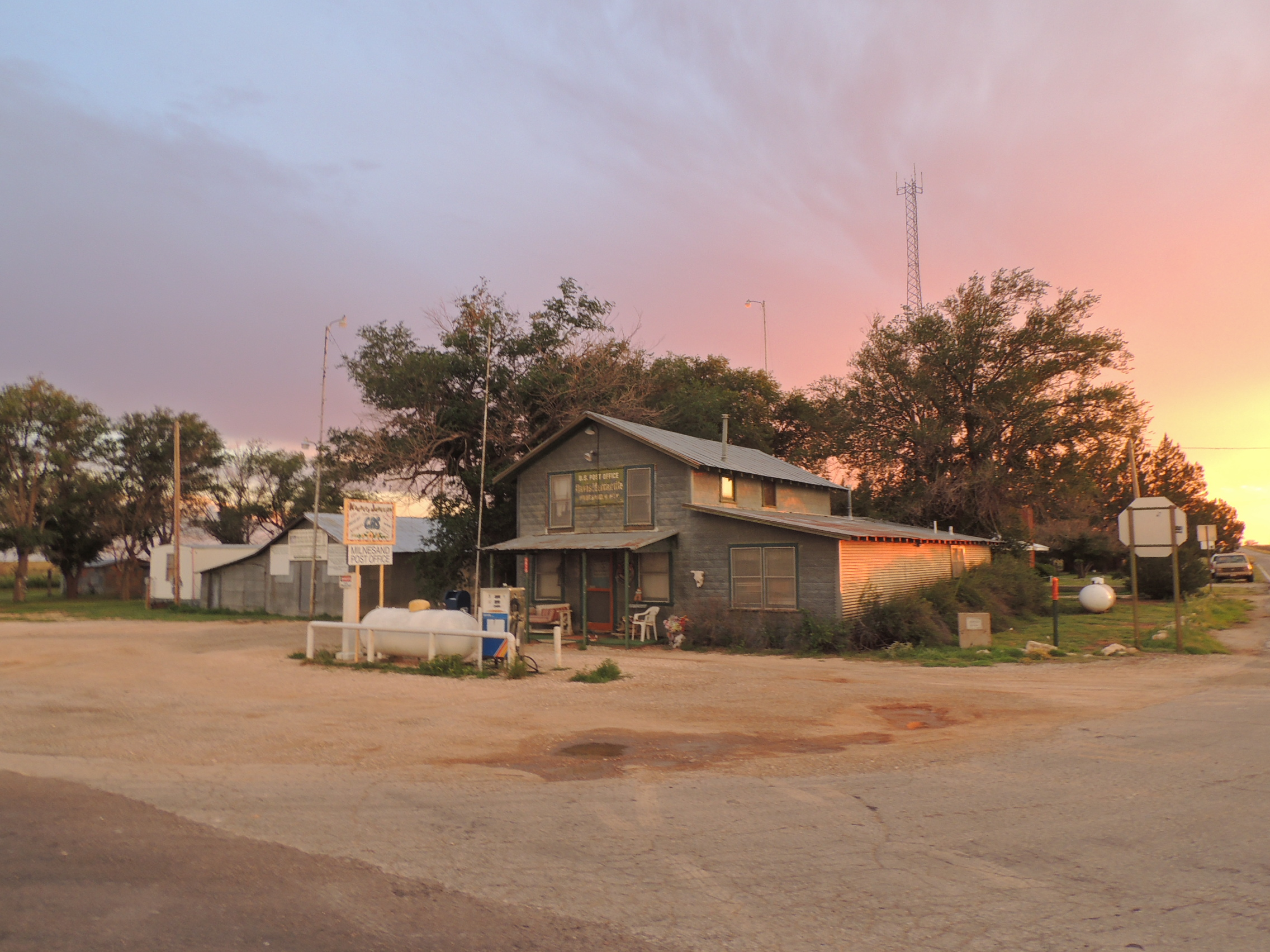

- Location within New Mexico
- Location: 4610 NM 206, Milnesand, New Mexico
- Coordinates: 33°38′34″N 103°20′24″W
- Area: 1 acre (0.40 ha)
- Built: 1932-35, c.1962
- NRHP reference No.: 100003218
- Added to NRHP: December 14, 2018

Davis Mercantile, in Milnesand, New Mexico, was listed on the National Register of Historic Places in 2018.

It is a historic crossroads store, built in 1932–35, and has also been known as the Flying M Store. The store is a two-story, three-bay frame building with a gable roof, and a full-width shed-roofed porch. A sign on the main facade states "U.S. Post Office / Davis Mercantile / Milnesand, N. Mex.". The store was expanded by a one-story addition around 1962.

The listing includes the store, the Davis house, and several outbuildings and structures.

It is located at 4610 New Mexico State Road 206.
