= New Mexico State Road 258 =

State highway in New Mexico, United States

State Road 258

Route information
- Maintained by NMDOT
- Length: 9.98 mi (16.06 km)

Major junctions
- Western end: South Roosevelt Road 41 near Milnesand
- Eastern end: NM 206 / NM 262 in Milnesand

Location
- Country: United States
- State: New Mexico
- Counties: Roosevelt

Highway system
- New Mexico State Highway System; Interstate; US; State; Scenic
← NM 256	→ NM 261

State Road 258 (NM 258) is a 9.98-mile-long (16.06 km) state highway in the US state of New Mexico. NM 258's western terminus is a continuation as South Roosevelt Road 41 west of Milnesand, and the eastern terminus is at NM 206 and the western terminus of NM 262 in Milnesand.

== Major intersections ==
The entire route is in Roosevelt County.

Location	mi	km	Destinations	Notes
	0.000	0.000	NM 206 / NM 262 east	Eastern terminus, western terminus of NM 262
	9.980	16.061	South Roosevelt Road 41	Western terminus, continues west as South Roosevelt Road 41
1.000 mi = 1.609 km; 1.000 km = 0.621 mi
