= New Mexico State Road 321 =

State highway in New Mexico, United States

State Road 321

Route information
- Maintained by NMDOT
- Length: 4.606 mi (7.413 km)

Major junctions
- West end: NM 114 in Causey
- East end: FM 54 at the Texas–New Mexico state line

Location
- Country: United States
- State: New Mexico
- Counties: Roosevelt

Highway system
- New Mexico State Highway System; Interstate; US; State; Scenic
← NM 320	→ NM 322

State Road 321 (NM 321) is a 4.6-mile-long (7.4 km) state highway in the US state of New Mexico. NM 321's western terminus is at NM 114 in Causey, and the eastern terminus is at Farm to Market Road 54 (FM 54) at the Texas–New Mexico state line.

== Major intersections ==
The entire route is in Roosevelt County.

Location	mi	km	Destinations	Notes
Causey	0.000	0.000	NM 114	Western terminus
	4.606	7.413	FM 54	Eastern terminus at the Texas–New Mexico state line
1.000 mi = 1.609 km; 1.000 km = 0.621 mi
