= New Mexico State Road 130 =

Highway in New Mexico

State Road 130

Route information
- Maintained by NMDOT
- Length: 21.872 mi (35.200 km)

Major junctions
- East end: US 82 in Mayhill
- NM 24 near Weed
- West end: US 82 in Cloudcroft

Location
- Country: United States
- State: New Mexico
- Counties: Otero

Highway system
- New Mexico State Highway System; Interstate; US; State; Scenic
← NM 129	→ NM 131

State Road 130 (NM 130) is a 21.9-mile-long (35.2 km) state highway in the US state of New Mexico. NM 130's eastern terminus is at U.S. Route 82 (US 82) in Mayhill, and the western terminus is at US 82 in Cloudcroft.

== Major intersections ==
The entire route is in Otero County.

Location	mi	km	Destinations	Notes
Cloudcroft	0.000	0.000	US 82	Western terminus
	1.900	3.058	NM 6563 south	Northern terminus of NM 6563
	16.725	26.916	NM 24 east	Western terminus of NM 24
Mayhill	21.872	35.200	US 82	Eastern terminus
1.000 mi = 1.609 km; 1.000 km = 0.621 mi

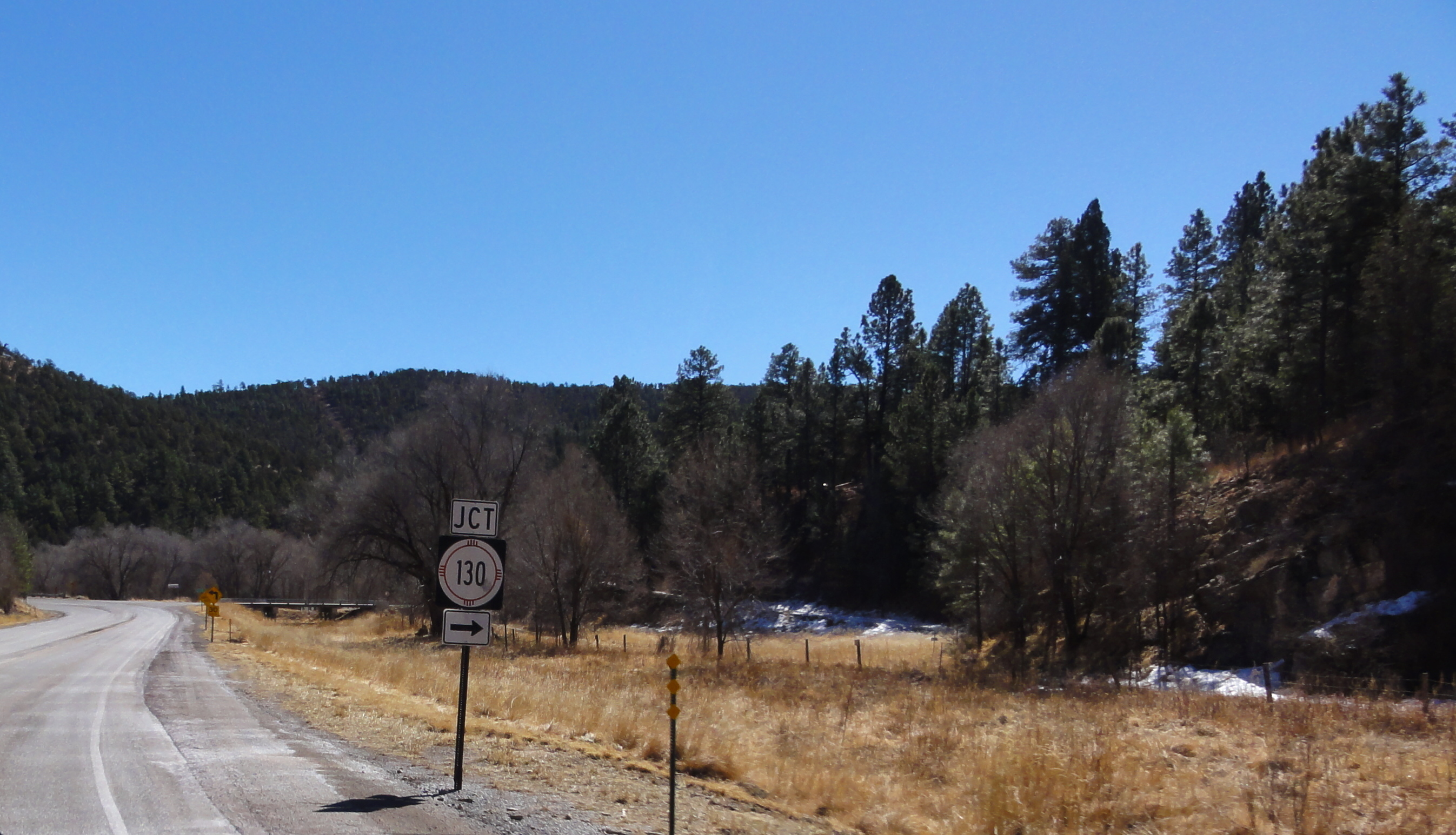
US 82 approaching junction with NM 130
