= Midway Service Station =

- U.S. National Register of Historic Places
- NM State Register of Cultural Properties
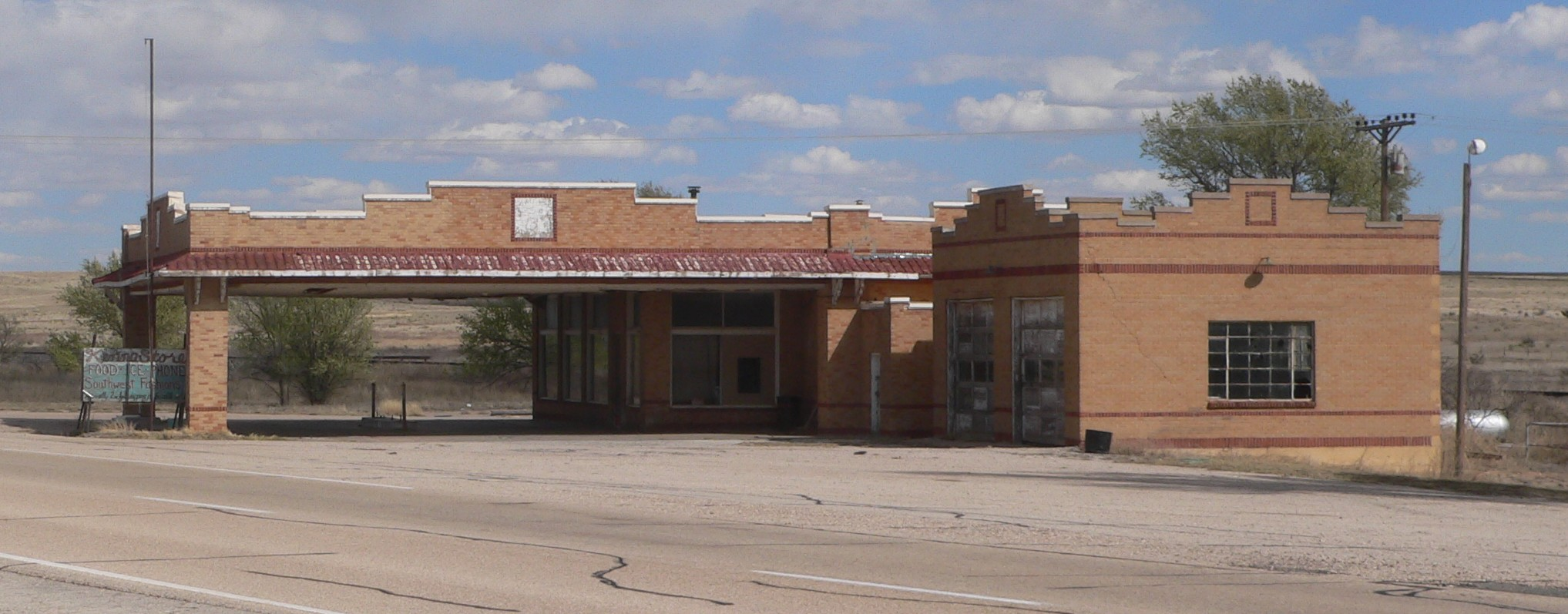

- Location within New Mexico Location within the United States
- Location: 38797 US 70, Kenna, New Mexico
- Coordinates: 33°50′31″N 103°46′19″W
- Area: less than one acre
- Built: 1938
- Architectural style: Mission/Spanish Revival
- NRHP reference No.: 04001479
- NMSRCP No.: 1872

Significant dates
- Added to NRHP: January 12, 2005
- Designated NMSRCP: January 12, 2005

The Midway Service Station at 38797 U.S. Highway 70 in Kenna in Roosevelt County, New Mexico, was built in 1938. It has also been known as Old Kenna Store. It was listed on the National Register of Historic Places in 2005.

It is a former Phillips 66 gas station, and it included a drugstore and soda fountain. In 2004 there were stock pens nearby, and the population of Kenna was 14.

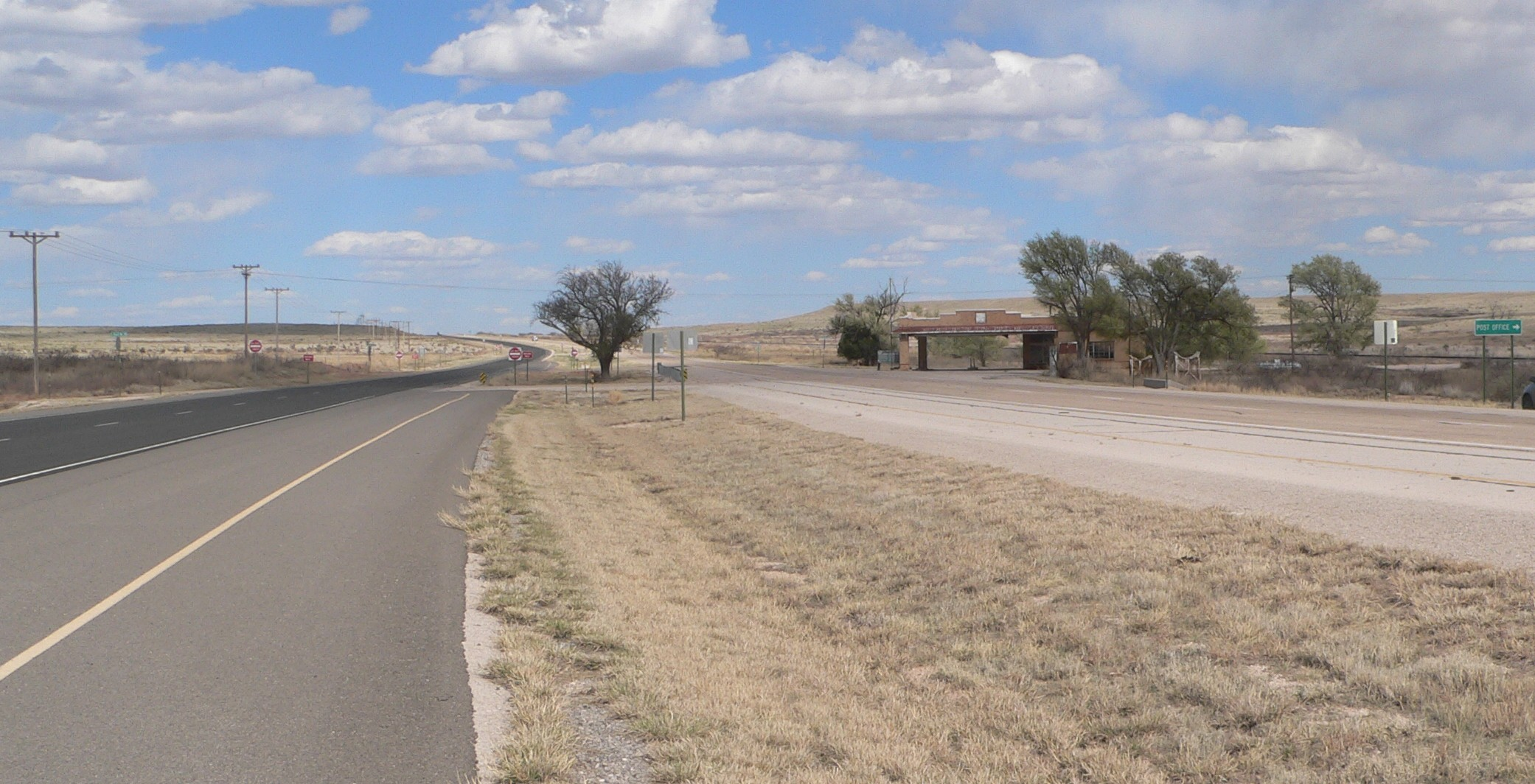

The service station, built in 1938, consists of two buildings. The main one has a 33 feet (10 m) girder-supported canopy over gas pump islands. It has a stepped brick parapet above the canopy. As of 2004, it hosted a store area and a leased post office; the latter space was formerly the Kenna Bank & Trust Company and still includes a bank vault with a Mosler Safe Co. safe.

The second structure is a car repair garage with two wood and glass roll up doors, which is set back on the property.

The building was destroyed by fire on December 21, 2024.
