= Clovis–Portales combined statistical area =

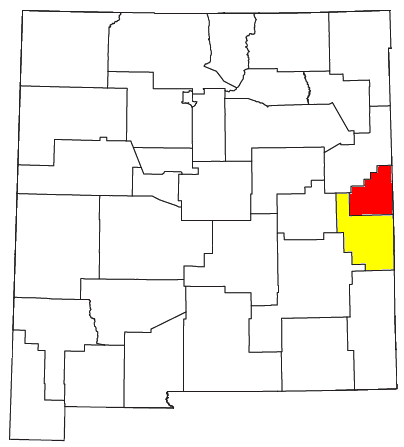
Location of the Clovis–Portales CSA and its components: Clovis Micropolitan Statistical Area Portales Micropolitan Statistical Area

The Clovis–Portales combined statistical area is made up of two counties in east central New Mexico. The statistical area consists of the Clovis Micropolitan Statistical Area and the Portales Micropolitan Statistical Area. As of the 2000 census, the CSA had a population of 63,062 (though a July 1, 2009 estimate placed the population at 63,224).

== Counties ==
- Curry County
- Roosevelt County

== Communities ==
- Cannon AFB
- Causey
- Clovis (Principal city)
- Dora
- Elida
- Floyd
- Grady
- Kenna
- Melrose
- Milnesand
- Portales (Principal city)
- Texico

== Demographics ==
As of the census of 2000, there were 63,062 people, 23,405 households, and 16,411 families residing within the CSA. The racial makeup of the CSA was 72.90% White, 5.37% African American, 1.03% Native American, 1.45% Asian, 0.11% Pacific Islander, 15.70% from other races, and 3.43% from two or more races. Hispanic or Latino of any race were 31.21% of the population.

The median income for a household in the CSA was $27,752, and the median income for a family was $32,857. Males had a median income of $25,628 versus $20,104 for females. The per capita income for the CSA was $14,617.

== See also ==
- List of metropolitan areas in New Mexico
- List of micropolitan areas in New Mexico
- List of cities in New Mexico
