= KKYC =

- Clovis, New Mexico; United States
- Broadcast area: Clovis area
- Frequency: 102.3 MHz

Ownership
- Owner: Monte Spearman and Gentry Todd Spearman; (HPRN Networks, LLP)
- Sister stations: KGRW, KICA, KICA-FM, KKNM

History
- First air date: 1992
- Former call signs: KWUA (1992–1998)

Technical information
- Facility ID: 33402
- Class: C3
- ERP: 25,000 watts
- HAAT: 54 meters (177 ft)
- Transmitter coordinates: 34°24′31″N 103°11′15″W

Links
- Website: hpr.network/new-mexico

KKYC (102.3 FM) was a radio station licensed to Clovis, New Mexico, United States, and served the Clovis area. The station was last owned by Monte Spearman and Gentry Todd Spearman's High Plains Radio Network, through licensee HPRN Networks, LLP, and last broadcast a classic rock and rock format.

== History ==
In May 2016, KKYC changed format from Classic Rock to an all Rock mix devised by Corporate Rock Program Director Matt Miller. The popular format offered the core Classic Rock favorites in addition to 2000s and current hits. Miller added a new vibe to the station with big-name artist interviews, un-duplicated on-air contesting and outside the box event and promotions. Miller left KKYC April 5, 2017.

The station went on the air as KWUA on June 18, 1992. On September 11, 1998, the station changed its callsign to KKYC.

HPRN Networks surrendered KKYC's license to the Federal Communications Commission on November 29, 2021, who cancelled it the same day.
