= New Mexico State Road 457 =

State highway in New Mexico, United States

State Road 457

Route information
- Maintained by NMDOT
- Length: 31.862 mi (51.277 km)

Major junctions
- South end: US 82 near Lovington
- North end: US 380 near Tatum

Location
- Country: United States
- State: New Mexico
- Counties: Lea

Highway system
- New Mexico State Highway System; Interstate; US; State; Scenic
← NM 456	→ NM 458

State Road 457 (NM 457) is a 31.862-mile-long (51.277 km) state highway in the US state of New Mexico. NM 457's southern terminus is at U.S. Route 82 (US 82) west of Lovington, and the northern terminus is at US 380 west-northwest of Tatum.

== Major intersections ==
The entire route is in Lea County.

Location	mi	km	Destinations	Notes
	0.000	0.000	US 82	Southern terminus
	31.862	51.277	US 380	Northern terminus
1.000 mi = 1.609 km; 1.000 km = 0.621 mi
