= New Mexico State Road 262 =

State highway in New Mexico, United States

State Road 262

Route information
- Maintained by NMDOT
- Length: 17.640 mi (28.389 km)

Major junctions
- Western end: NM 206 / NM 258 in Milnesand
- Eastern end: FM 2182 at the Texas state border near Bledsoe, TX

Location
- Country: United States
- State: New Mexico
- Counties: Roosevelt

Highway system
- New Mexico State Highway System; Interstate; US; State; Scenic
← NM 261	→ NM 263

State Road 262 (NM 262) is a 17.640-mile-long (28.389 km) state highway in the US state of New Mexico. NM 262's western terminus is at NM 206 and the eastern terminus of NM 258 in Milnesand, and the eastern terminus is a continuation as Farm to Market Road 2182 (FM 2182) at the Texas/ New Mexico border.

== Major intersections ==
The entire route is in Roosevelt County.

Location	mi	km	Destinations	Notes
Milnesand	0.000	0.000	NM 206 / NM 258 west	Western terminus, eastern terminus of NM 258
	17.640	28.389	FM 2182	Eastern terminus, continues as FM 2182 at the Texas/ New Mexico border
1.000 mi = 1.609 km; 1.000 km = 0.621 mi
