= New Mexico State Road 6563 =

Highway in New Mexico

State Road 6563
- Sunspot Scenic Byway
- NM 6563 highlighted in red

Route information
- Maintained by NMDOT
- Length: 15.530 mi (24.993 km)

Major junctions
- South end: Sacramento Peak National Solar Observatory
- North end: NM 130 near Cloudcroft

Location
- Country: United States
- State: New Mexico
- Counties: Otero

Highway system
- New Mexico State Highway System; Interstate; US; State; Scenic
← NM 5001	→ NM 1

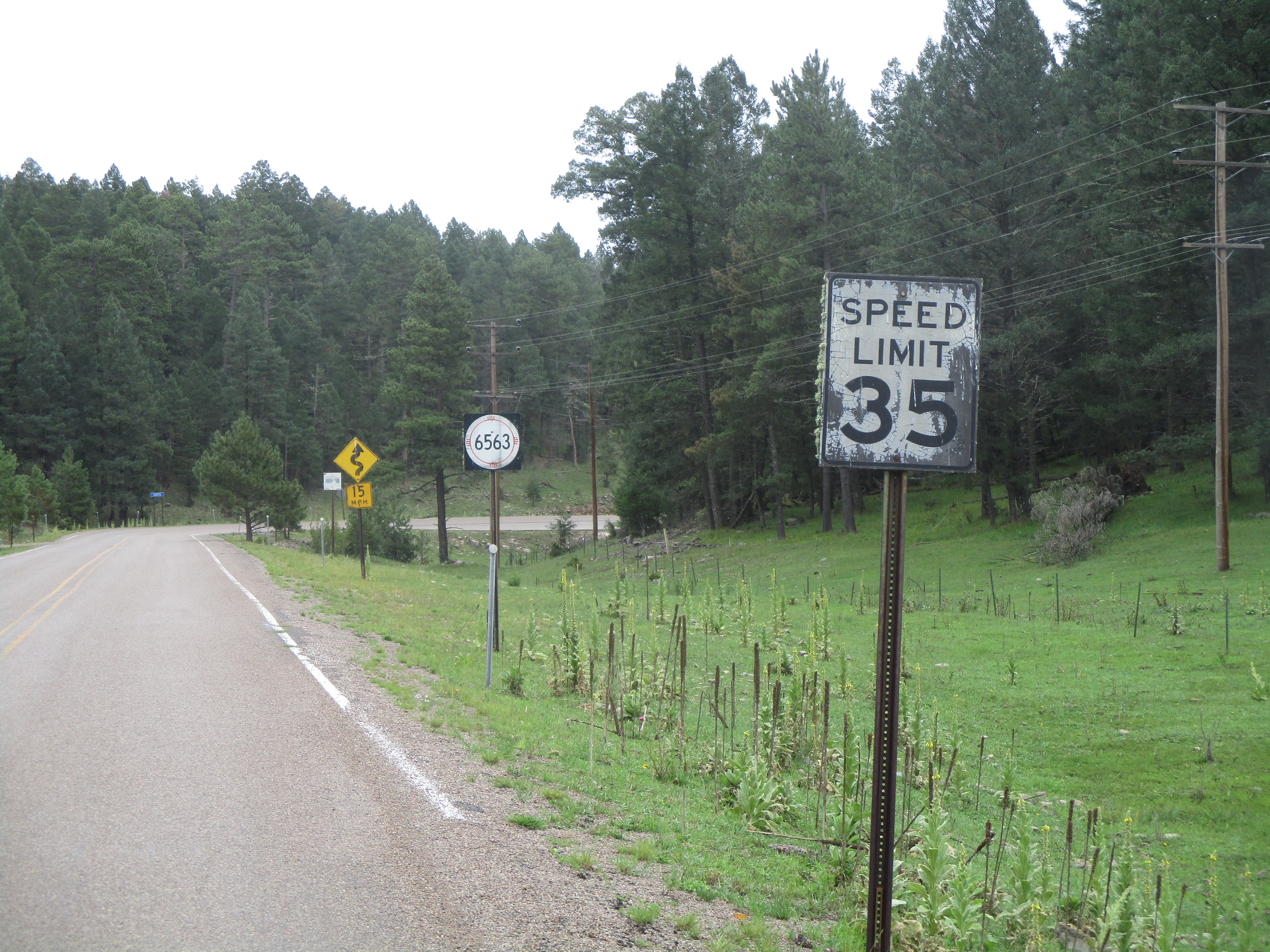
View exiting Sunspot, New Mexico

State Road 6563 (NM 6563), also known as the Sunspot Scenic Byway, is a 15.530-mile-long (24.993 km) two-lane state highway in Otero County, New Mexico, United States.

== Route description ==
NM 6563 begins at the National Solar Observatory at Sunspot in the Lincoln National Forest. It then travels northward to its northern terminus at NM 130.

NM 6563 is one of only three four-digit state highways in New Mexico (the others being NM 1113 and NM 5001). It takes its number from the wavelength of the Hydrogen-alpha spectral line (6563 Å) used by scientists at the observatory to study the solar chromosphere and to locate solar flares on the Sun.

The solar observatory added signs along the highway in 2011 with the names of the planets as part of a 1:250 million model of the distances between planets in the Solar System.

== History ==
The highway was designated a National Forest scenic byway on October 6, 1990.

== Major intersections ==
The entire route is in Otero County.

Location	mi	km	Destinations	Notes
Sunspot	0.000	0.000	Sacramento Peak National Solar Observatory	Southern terminus
	15.530	24.993	NM 130 (Cox Canyon Highway) – Cloudcroft, Mayhill	Northern terminus
1.000 mi = 1.609 km; 1.000 km = 0.621 mi
