= List of micropolitan areas in New Mexico =

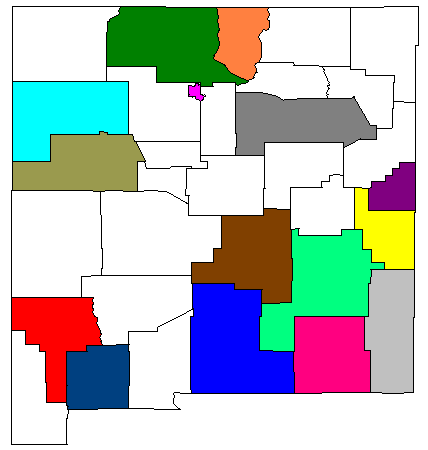
Micropolitan areas of New Mexico.

The State of New Mexico has a total of fifteen micropolitan areas. As of the 2000 Census, these counties had a combined population of 589,371 (32.4% of the state's total population). Based on a July 1, 2009 population estimate, that figure had increased to 597,079 (29.7% of the state's total population).

== Micropolitan areas ==
- Alamogordo μSA
  - Otero County
- Carlsbad-Artesia μSA
  - Eddy County
- Clovis μSA^{1}
  - Curry County
- Deming μSA
  - Luna County
- Espanola μSA^{2}
  - Rio Arriba County
- Gallup μSA
  - McKinley County
- Grants μSA^{2}
  - Cibola County
- Hobbs μSA
  - Lea County
- Las Vegas μSA^{2}
  - San Miguel County
- Los Alamos μSA^{2}
  - Los Alamos County
- Portales μSA^{1}
  - Roosevelt County
- Roswell μSA
  - Chaves County
- Ruidoso μSA
  - Lincoln County
- Silver City μSA
  - Grant County
- Taos μSA
  - Taos County

^{1} - part of the Clovis-Portales combined statistical area
^{2} - part of the Albuquerque-Santa Fe-Las Vegas combined statistical area

=== Population statistics ===
Micropolitan Statistical Area	July 1, 2009 Estimate	2000 Population	Percent Change (2000–2009)
Alamogordo	63,201	62,298	1.45%
Carlsbad-Artesia	52,706	51,658	–2.03%
Clovis	44,407	45,044	–1.41%
Deming	27,044	25,016	8.11%
Espanola	40,678	41,190	–1.24%
Gallup	70,513	74,798	–5.73%
Grants	27,036	25,595	5.63%
Hobbs	60,232	55,511	8.50%
Las Vegas	28,323	30,126	–5.98%
Los Alamos	18,074	18,343	–1.47%
Portales	18,817	18,018	4.43%
Roswell	63,322	61,382	3.65%
Ruidoso	21,016	19,411	8.27%
Silver City	29,903	31,002	–3.54%
Taos	31,507	29,979	5.10%

== See also ==
- List of metropolitan areas in New Mexico
- List of cities in New Mexico
- New Mexico census statistical areas
- Table of United States primary census statistical areas (PCSA)
- Table of United States Combined Statistical Areas (CSA)
- Table of United States Metropolitan Statistical Areas (MSA)
- Table of United States Micropolitan Statistical Areas (μSA)
