= New Mexico State Road 256 =

State highway in New Mexico, United States

State Road 256
- NM 256 highlighted in red

Route information
- Maintained by NMDOT
- Length: 8.320 mi (13.390 km)

Major junctions
- Southern end: NM 2 near Roswell
- Northern end: US 380 in Roswell

Location
- Country: United States
- State: New Mexico
- Counties: Chaves

Highway system
- New Mexico State Highway System; Interstate; US; State; Scenic
← NM 255	→ NM 258

State Road 256 (NM 256) is a 8.320-mile-long (13.390 km) state highway in the US state of New Mexico. NM 256's southern terminus is at NM 2 south-southeast of Roswell, and the northern terminus is at U.S. Route 380 (US 380) in Roswell.

== Major intersections ==
The entire route is in Chaves County.

Location	mi	km	Destinations	Notes
	0.000	0.000	NM 2	Southern terminus
	1.378	2.218	NM 255 east	Western terminus of NM 255
	3.749	6.033	NM 253 east	Western terminus of NM 253
	4.922	7.921	NM 254 north	Southern terminus of NM 254
Roswell	8.320	13.390	US 380	Northern terminus
1.000 mi = 1.609 km; 1.000 km = 0.621 mi
