= New Mexico State Road 261 =

Highway in New Mexico

State Road 261
- NM 261 highlighted in red

Route information
- Maintained by NMDOT
- Length: 4.571 mi (7.356 km)

Major junctions
- Southern end: NM 253 near Roswell
- Northern end: NM 254 near Roswell

Location
- Country: United States
- State: New Mexico
- Counties: Chaves

Highway system
- New Mexico State Highway System; Interstate; US; State; Scenic
← NM 258	→ NM 262

State Road 261 (NM 261) is a 4.571-mile-long (7.356 km) state highway in the US state of New Mexico. NM 261's southern terminus is at NM 253 southeast of Roswell, and the northern terminus is at NM 254 southeast of Roswell.

== Major intersections ==
The entire route is in Chaves County.

Location	mi	km	Destinations	Notes
	0.000	0.000	NM 253	Southern terminus
	4.571	7.356	NM 254	Northern terminus
1.000 mi = 1.609 km; 1.000 km = 0.621 mi
