= Pep, New Mexico =

Unincorporated community in New Mexico, US

Coordinates: 33°50′10″N 103°20′7″W

Pep
- Unincorporated community
- Location in New Mexico
- Country: United States
- State: New Mexico
- County: Roosevelt
- Time zone: UTC-7 (Mountain (MST))
  - Summer (DST): UTC-6 (MDT)
- ZIP Code: 88126

Pep is an unincorporated community in southern Roosevelt County, in the southeastern part of the U.S. state of New Mexico. The community is composed almost entirely of farms and cattle ranches and is located approximately seven miles south of Dora on New Mexico State Road 206. The ZIP Code for Pep is 88126.

The origin of the name "Pep" is obscure. Its population is approximately 10. Among its features is the Eagle Hill Cemetery.

Science fiction author Jack Williamson grew up on a ranch near Pep.
