= New Mexico State Road 253 =

State highway in New Mexico, United States

State Road 253
- NM 253 highlighted in red

Route information
- Maintained by NMDOT
- Length: 5.4 mi (8.7 km)

Major junctions
- Western end: NM 256 near Roswell
- Eastern end: End of route near Roswell

Location
- Country: United States
- State: New Mexico
- Counties: Chaves

Highway system
- New Mexico State Highway System; Interstate; US; State; Scenic
← NM 252	→ NM 254

State Road 253 (NM 253) is a 5.4-mile-long (8.7 km) state highway in the US state of New Mexico. NM 253's western terminus is at NM 256 southeast of Roswell, and the eastern terminus is at the end of route southeast of Roswell.

== Major intersections ==
The entire route is in Chaves County.

Location	mi	km	Destinations	Notes
	0.000	0.000	NM 256	Western terminus
	2.000	3.219	NM 261 north	Southern terminus of NM 261
	2.320	3.734	NM 255 west	Eastern terminus of NM 255
	5.400	8.690	End of route	Eastern terminus
1.000 mi = 1.609 km; 1.000 km = 0.621 mi
