= New Mexico State Road 254 =

State highway in New Mexico, United States

State Road 254
- NM 254 highlighted in red

Route information
- Maintained by NMDOT
- Length: 4.378 mi (7.046 km)

Major junctions
- Southern end: NM 256 in Roswell
- Northern end: US 380 in Roswell

Location
- Country: United States
- State: New Mexico
- Counties: Chaves

Highway system
- New Mexico State Highway System; Interstate; US; State; Scenic
← NM 253	→ NM 255

State Road 254 (NM 254) is a 4.378-mile-long (7.046 km) state highway in the US state of New Mexico. NM 254's northern terminus is at U.S. Route 380 (US 380) in Roswell, and the southern terminus is at NM 256 in Roswell.

== Major intersections ==
The entire route is in Roswell, Chaves County.

mi	km	Destinations	Notes
0.000	0.000	NM 256	Southern terminus
3.090	4.973	NM 261 south	Northern terminus of NM 261
4.378	7.046	US 380	Northern terminus
1.000 mi = 1.609 km; 1.000 km = 0.621 mi
