= Anna Crook =

American politician (born 1934)

Member of the New Mexico House of Representatives from the 64th district
- In office January 1995 – January 2015
- Preceded by: Blake Curtis
- Succeeded by: Randal Crowder

Personal details
- Born: December 6, 1934 (age 91) Crossroads, New Mexico, U.S.
- Party: Republican
- Education: Eastern New Mexico University; New Mexico Highlands University
- Website: AnnaCrook.net

Anna M. Crook (born December 6, 1934) is an American politician and a Republican former member of the New Mexico House of Representatives representing District 64 from January 1995 through 2015. She did not seek reelection in 2014.

== Education ==
Crook earned her BA from the Eastern New Mexico University with graduate work there.

== Elections ==
- 1994 When District 64 Republican Representative Blake Curtis left the seat open, Crook ran as Mrs. Jerry W. Crook in the June 7, 1994, Republican Primary, winning with 861 votes (59.1%) and won the November 8, 1994, general election with 4,267 votes (63.3%) against Democratic nominee Robert Hartley.
- 1996 Crook was unopposed for both the June 4, 1996, Republican Primary, winning with 870 votes and the November 5, 1996, general election.
- 1998 Crook was unopposed for both the June 2, 1998, Republican Primary, winning with 1,465 votes and the November 3, 1998, general election, winning with 5,633 votes.
- 2000 Crook was unopposed for both the 2000 Republican Primary, winning with 1,312 votes and the November 7, 2000, general election, winning with 6,466 votes.
- 2002 Crook was unopposed for both the 2002 Republican Primary, winning with 1,766 votes and the November 5, 2002, general election, winning with 5,271 votes.
- 2004 Crook was unopposed for both the June 1, 2004, Republican Primary, winning with 2,131 votes and the November 2, 2004, general election, winning with 7,691 votes.
- 2006 Crook was unopposed for both the June 6, 2006, Republican Primary, winning with 1,848 votes and the November 7, 2006, general election, winning with 4,753 votes.
- 2008 Crook was unopposed for the June 8, 2008, Republican Primary, winning with 1,772 votes and won the November 4, 2008, general election with 5,977 votes (64%) against Democratic nominee Mario Trujillo.
- 2010 Crook was challenged in the June 1, 2010, Republican Primary, winning with 1,954 votes (86.7%) and was unopposed for the November 2, 2010, general election, winning with 5,529 votes.
- 2012 Crook was again challenged by her 2010 primary opponent in the June 5, 2012, Republican Primary, winning with 2,434 votes (88.8%) and was unopposed for the November 6, 2012, general election, winning with 7,646 votes.
