= New Mexico State Road 24 =

State highway in New Mexico, United States

State Road 24

Route information
- Maintained by NMDOT
- Length: 52.023 mi (83.723 km)

Major junctions
- West end: NM 130 near Mayhill
- East end: US 82 near Dunken

Location
- Country: United States
- State: New Mexico
- Counties: Otero, Chaves

Highway system
- New Mexico State Highway System; Interstate; US; State; Scenic
← NM 23	→ I-25

State Road 24 (NM 24) is a state highway in the US state of New Mexico. Its total length is approximately 52 miles (84 km). NM 24's western terminus is at NM 130 southwest of Mayhill, and the eastern terminus is at U.S. Route 82 (US 82) north-northeast of Dunken.

== Major intersections ==
County	Location	mi	km	Destinations	Notes
Otero		0.000	0.000	NM 130	Western terminus
Otero	Weed	4.975	8.006	Agua Chiquita Road	Eastern terminus of former NM 521
Chaves		52.023	83.723	US 82	Eastern terminus
1.000 mi = 1.609 km; 1.000 km = 0.621 mi
