= New Mexico State Road 13 =

State highway in New Mexico, United States

State Road 13
- NM 13 highlighted in red

Route information
- Maintained by NMDOT
- Length: 36.002 mi (57.940 km)

Major junctions
- West end: US 82 near Hope
- East end: US 285 near Hagerman

Location
- Country: United States
- State: New Mexico
- Counties: Chaves

Highway system
- New Mexico State Highway System; Interstate; US; State; Scenic
← NM 12	→ NM 14

New Mexico State Route 13 (NM 13) is a 36.002-mile-long (57.940 km) state route in Chaves County, New Mexico. NM 13's western end is at U.S. Route 82 (US 82) west of Hope and Artesia, and the eastern end is at US 285 south of Roswell.

== Route description ==
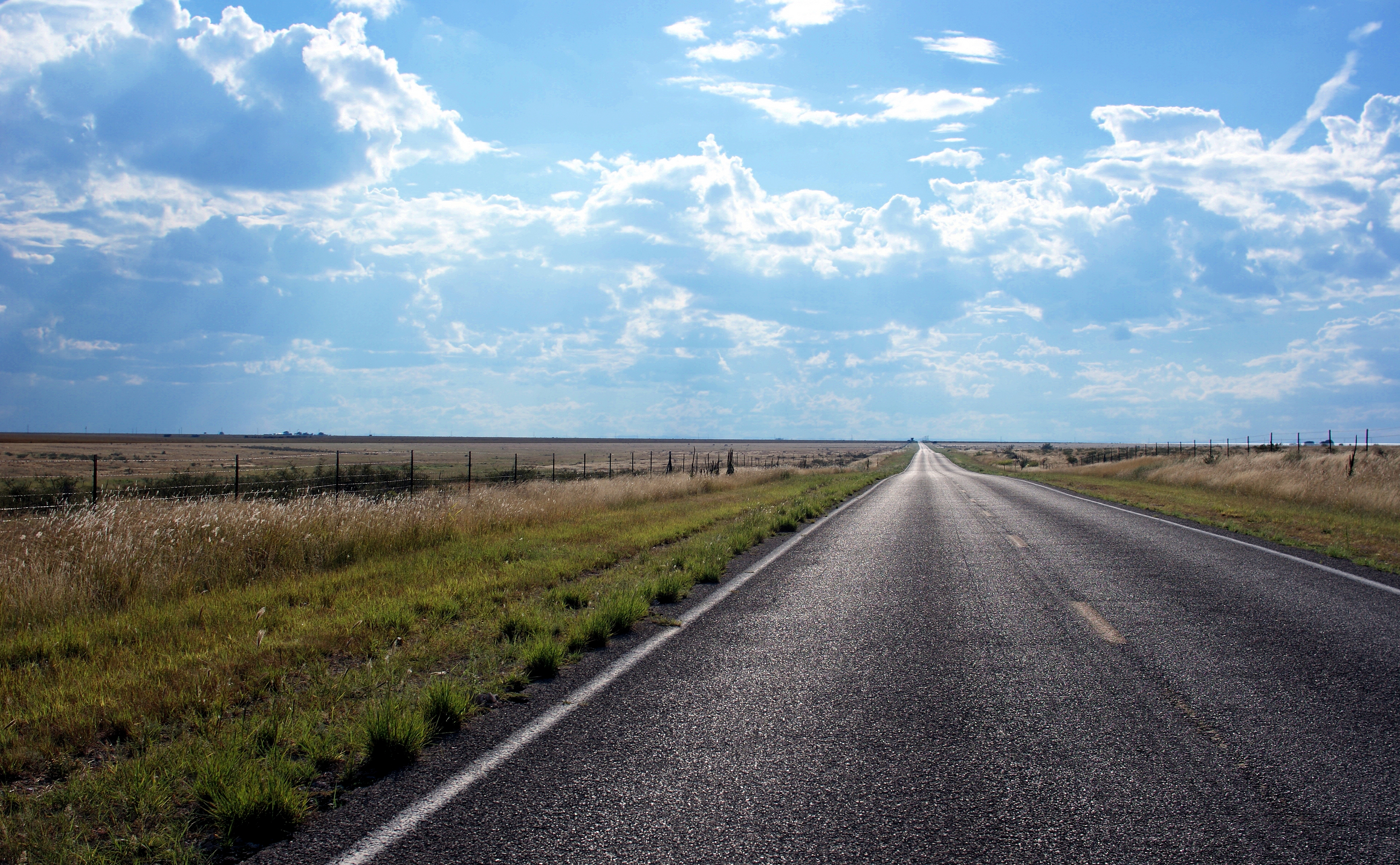
NM 13 slightly west of its intersection with US 285

NM 13 begins at an intersection with US 82 west of the city of Hope and begins traveling northeastward. It then ends at an intersection with US 285 south of the city of Roswell.

== Major intersections ==
The entire route is in Chaves County.

Location	mi	km	Destinations	Notes
	0.000	0.000	US 82 (Rio Peñasco Road) – Alamogordo, Artesia	Western terminus
	36.002	57.940	US 285 (Southeast Main Street) – Artesia, Roswell	Eastern terminus
1.000 mi = 1.609 km; 1.000 km = 0.621 mi

== See also ==
- List of state roads in New Mexico
