= New Mexico State Road 255 =

Highway in New Mexico

State Road 255
- NM 255 highlighted in red

Route information
- Maintained by NMDOT
- Length: 3.112 mi (5.008 km)

Major junctions
- Western end: NM 256 near Roswell
- Eastern end: NM 253 near Roswell

Location
- Country: United States
- State: New Mexico
- Counties: Chaves

Highway system
- New Mexico State Highway System; Interstate; US; State; Scenic
← NM 254	→ NM 256

State Road 255 (NM 255) is a 3,112-mile-long (5,008 km) state highway in the US state of New Mexico. NM 255's western terminus is at NM 256 southeast of Roswell, and the eastern terminus is at NM 253 southeast of Roswell.

== Major intersections ==
The entire route is in Chaves County.

Location	mi	km	Destinations	Notes
	0.000	0.000	NM 256	Western terminus
	3.112	5.008	NM 253	Eastern terminus
1.000 mi = 1.609 km; 1.000 km = 0.621 mi
