= New Mexico State Road 508 =

State highway in New Mexico, United States

State Road 508

Route information
- Maintained by NMDOT
- Length: 17.227 mi (27.724 km)

Major junctions
- West end: NM 206 near Tatum
- East end: NM 125 near Tatum

Location
- Country: United States
- State: New Mexico
- Counties: Lea

Highway system
- New Mexico State Highway System; Interstate; US; State; Scenic
← NM 507	→ NM 509

State Road 508 (NM 508) is a 17.227-mile-long (27.724 km) state highway in the US state of New Mexico. NM 508's western terminus is at NM 206 north of Tatum, and the eastern terminus is at NM 125 northeast of Tatum.

== Major intersections ==
The entire route is in Lea County.

Location	mi	km	Destinations	Notes
	0.000	0.000	NM 206	Western terminus
	17.227	27.724	NM 125	Eastern terminus
1.000 mi = 1.609 km; 1.000 km = 0.621 mi
