= Tatum Airport =

- IATA: none; ICAO: none; FAA LID: 18T

Summary
- Airport type: Public
- Owner: Town of Tatum
- Serves: Tatum, New Mexico
- Elevation AMSL: 3,986 ft / 1,215 m
- Coordinates: 33°15′39″N 103°16′43″W

Map
- Location of airport in New Mexico

Runways
Direction	Length		Surface
Direction	ft	m	Surface
12/30	2,920	890	Asphalt
5/23 (closed)	2,990	911	Asphalt

Statistics (2023)
- Aircraft operations (year ending 3/31/2023): 500
- Source: Federal Aviation Administration

Tatum Airport (FAA LID: 18T, formerly E07) is a public use airport located three nautical miles (6 km) east of the central business district of Tatum, a town in Lea County, New Mexico, United States. Currently owned by the Town of Tatum, it was formerly owned by the New Mexico Department of Transportation.

== Facilities and aircraft ==
Tatum Airport covers an area of 320 acres (129 ha) at an elevation of 3,986 feet (1,215 m) above mean sea level. It has two runways with asphalt surfaces. Runway 12/30, the only active runway, is 2,920 by 60 feet (890 x 18 m). Runway 5/23 is closed indefinitely and measures 2,990 by 75 feet (911 x 23 m).

For the 12-month period ending March 31, 2023 the airport had 500 general aviation aircraft operations, an average of 42 per month.
