= New Mexico State Road 235 =

State highway in New Mexico, United States

State Road 235

Route information
- Maintained by NMDOT
- Length: 17.879 mi (28.773 km)

Major junctions
- West end: NM 206 near Portales
- East end: FM 298 at the Texas/ New Mexico border

Location
- Country: United States
- State: New Mexico
- Counties: Roosevelt

Highway system
- New Mexico State Highway System; Interstate; US; State; Scenic
| ← NM 234 | → NM 236 |

State Road 235 (NM 235) is a 17.879-mile-long (28.773 km) state highway in the US state of New Mexico. NM 235's western terminus is at NM 206 south of Portales, and the eastern terminus is a continuation as Farm to Market Road 298 (FM 298) at the Texas/ New Mexico border.

== Major intersections ==
The entire route is in Roosevelt County.

| Location | mi | km | Destinations | Notes |
|---|---|---|---|---|
| | 0.000 | 0.000 | NM 206 | Western terminus |
| | 17.879 | 28.773 | FM 298 | Eastern terminus, continues as FM 298 |
1.000 mi = 1.609 km; 1.000 km = 0.621 mi
