= Bank of Portales =

- U.S. National Register of Historic Places
- NM State Register of Cultural Properties
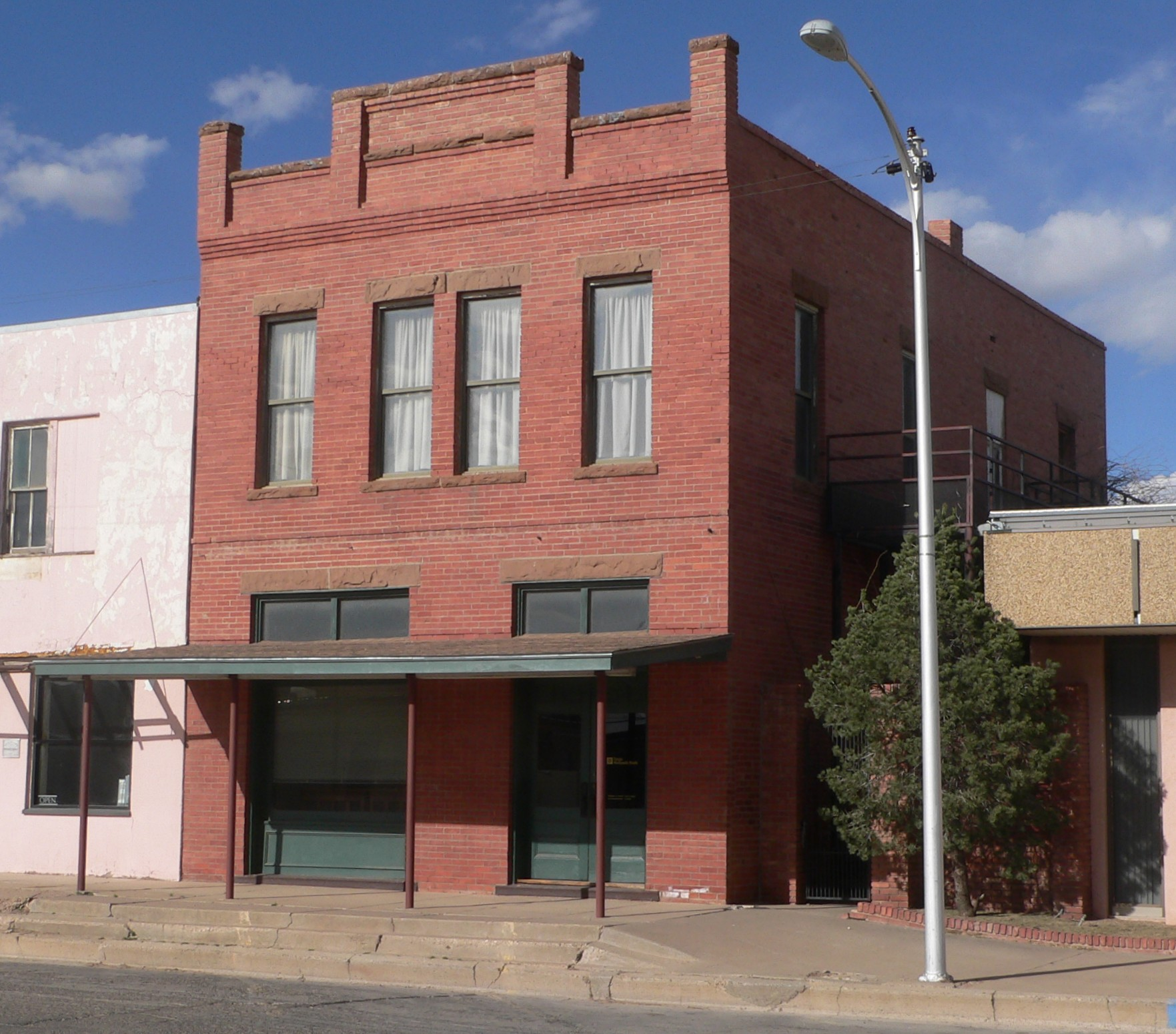

- Location within New Mexico Location within the United States
- Location: 123 Main, Portales, New Mexico
- Coordinates: 34.187016°N 103.337409°W
- Area: less than one acre
- Built: c.1903
- NRHP reference No.: 84000635
- NMSRCP No.: 1111

Significant dates
- Added to NRHP: December 27, 1984
- Designated NMSRCP: October 17, 1984

The Bank of Portales on Main Street in Portales, New Mexico, which has also been known as Citizens National Bank;Portales News Tribune Building, was built in 1902 or 1903 and was listed on the National Register of Historic Places in 1984.

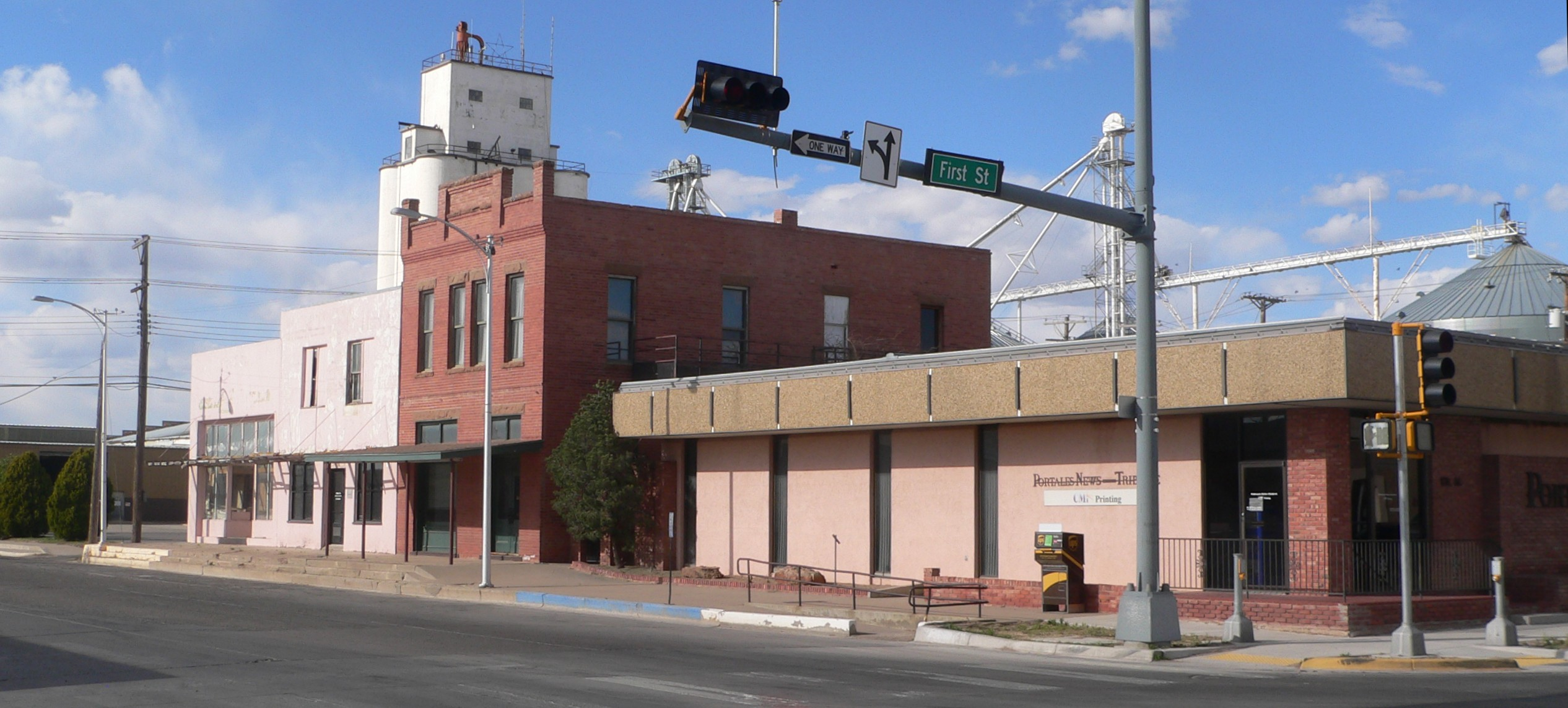

It is a two-story 30 by 60 feet (9.1 m × 18.3 m) commercial building.

A cafe, Do Drop In, is located at 123 S. Main.
