= KICA (AM) =

Radio station in Clovis, New Mexico

Clovis, New Mexico; United States
- Broadcast area: Amarillo, Texas
- Frequency: 980 kHz
- Branding: KICA AM 980

Programming
- Format: Defunct (was farm and agriculture)

Ownership
- Owner: Monte Spearman and Gentry Todd Spearman; (HPRN Networks LLC)
- Sister stations: KGRW, KICA-FM, KKNM

History
- First air date: 1932
- Last air date: December 31, 2022
- Former call signs: KICA (1932–1959); KVER (1959–1962)

Technical information
- Licensing authority: FCC
- Facility ID: 61577
- Class: D
- Power: 1,400 watts day; 172 watts night
- Transmitter coordinates: 34°20′55.27″N 102°57′19.8″W

Links
- Public license information: Public file; LMS
- Website: www.hpr.network/new-mexico

KICA (980 AM) was a radio station broadcasting a farm and agriculture format. Licensed to Clovis, New Mexico, the station served the Clovis-Portales CSA; it could also be heard in the Amarillo metropolitan area during the daytime. The station was owned by Monte Spearman and Gentry Todd Spearman's High Plains Radio Network, through licensee HPRN Networks LLC. Previously the station was "Rocket 980", with an oldies format.

KICA received its first license on July 15, 1932, and had the call sign KVER from November 1959 to September 4, 1962. The Federal Communications Commission cancelled the station’s license on March 12, 2024, because it had been silent since December 31, 2022, more than twelve consecutive months.
