= New Mexico State Road 206 =

State highway in New Mexico, United States

State Road 206

Route information
- Maintained by NMDOT
- Length: 83.879 mi (134.990 km)

Major junctions
- South end: US 82 in Lovington
- US 380 in Tatum
- North end: US 70 in Portales

Location
- Country: United States
- State: New Mexico
- Counties: Roosevelt, Lea

Highway system
- New Mexico State Highway System; Interstate; US; State; Scenic
| ← NM 205 | → NM 207 |

State Road 206 (NM 206) is an 83.9-mile-long (135.0 km) state highway in the US state of New Mexico. NM 206's southern terminus is in Lovington at US 82, and the northern terminus is at U.S. Route 70 (US 70) in Portales.

== Major intersections ==
| County | Location | mi | km | Destinations | Notes |
|---|---|---|---|---|---|
| Lea | Lovington | 0.000 | 0.000 | US 82 | Interchange; Southern terminus |
| Lea | Tatum | 19.279 | 31.027 | US 380 | |
| Lea | | 37.350 | 60.109 | NM 508 east | Western terminus of NM 508 |
| Roosevelt | Milnesand | 46.353 | 74.598 | NM 258 west / NM 262 east | Eastern terminus of NM 258, western terminus of NM 262 |
| Roosevelt | Pep | 60.739 | 97.750 | NM 458 east | Western terminus of NM 458 |
| Roosevelt | Dora | 66.789 | 107.486 | NM 114 | |
| Roosevelt | | 69.789 | 112.315 | NM 235 east | Western terminus of NM 235 |
| Roosevelt | Portales | 83.879 | 134.990 | US 70 | Northern terminus |
1.000 mi = 1.609 km; 1.000 km = 0.621 mi
