= KMUL (AM) =

Former simulcast of KICA

Farwell, Texas; United States
- Broadcast area: Clovis, New Mexico
- Frequency: 830 kHz
- Branding: Rocket 980

Programming
- Format: Oldies

Ownership
- Owner: Tallgrass Broadcasting

History
- First air date: 1956
- Last air date: 2013
- Former call signs: KLZK (1991–1993)

Technical information
- Facility ID: 61572
- Class: D
- Power: 1,100 watts day; 10 watts night
- Transmitter coordinates: 34°29′42.3″N 103°23′40.8″W

KMUL (830 AM) was a radio station broadcasting an oldies format. Formerly licensed to Farwell, Texas, United States, the station served Clovis, New Mexico, and Muleshoe, Texas. The station was owned by Tallgrass Broadcasting.

== History ==
The station was first licensed, as KMUL, on September 7, 1956. The call letters were changed to KLZK on June 14, 1991, then back to KMUL on April 1, 1993.

KMUL's owners surrendered the station's license to the Federal Communications Commission on September 30, 2013. The FCC cancelled the license on March 12, 2014.
