= KGRW =

- Friona, Texas; United States
- Broadcast area: Clovis area
- Frequency: 94.7 MHz
- Branding: KGRW FM 94.7

Programming
- Format: Regional Mexican

Ownership
- Owner: HPRN Networks, LLP
- Sister stations: KKNM

Technical information
- Licensing authority: FCC
- Facility ID: 858
- Class: C2
- ERP: 48,000 watts
- HAAT: 152.5 meters (500 ft)
- Transmitter coordinates: 34°38′45″N 102°43′35″W

Links
- Public license information: Public file; LMS
- Website: www.hpr.network/texas

KGRW (94.7 FM) is a radio station broadcasting a country music format. Licensed to Friona, Texas, United States, the station serves the Clovis-Portales CSA. The station is owned by HPRN Networks, LLP

== History ==
The station went on the air as KGRW on April 22, 1993. On May 17, 1993, the station changed its call sign to the current KGRW.
