= Kenna, New Mexico =

Unincorporated community in Roosevelt County, New Mexico, United States

Kenna
- Unincorporated community
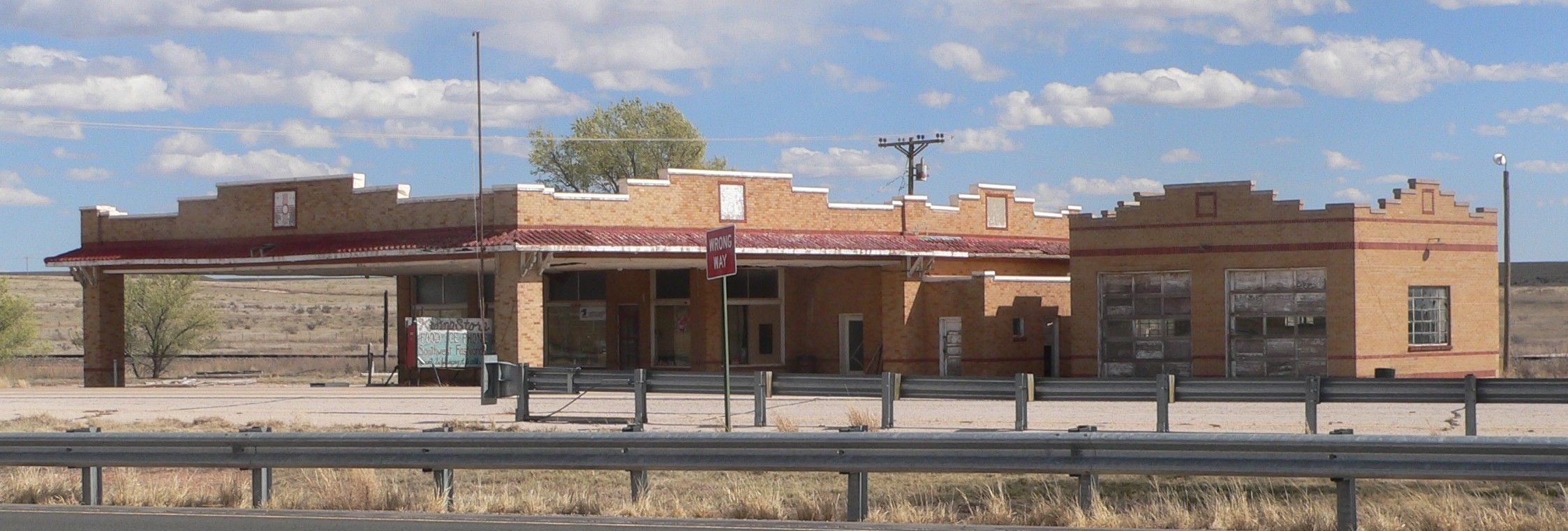
- Kenna Store, formerly Midway Service Station, listed in National Register of Historic Places

- Location of Kenna in New Mexico
- Coordinates: 33°50′32″N 103°46′19″W
- Country: United States
- State: New Mexico
- County: Roosevelt
- Region: Llano Estacado
- Founded: 1902
- Elevation: 4,462 ft (1,360 m)
- Time zone: UTC-7 (Mountain (MST))
- Zip code: 88122
- Area code: 575
- GNIS feature ID: 915847
- Website: Office of the State Historian

Kenna is an unincorporated community in Roosevelt County, New Mexico, United States. It is located on U.S. Route 70, 30 mi (48 km) southwest of Portales.

== History ==
The settlement was originally known as Urton, probably named for two brothers who came to the region from the state of Missouri in 1884. A contractor by the name of Kenna camped in Urton during the construction of a roadbed for the Atchison, Topeka and Santa Fe Railway. Kenna's camp served as a stopping place for stagecoaches to exchange mail as well as passengers.

In 1899, when the railroad was completed, the name Kenna remained for the camp. Established first as Urton in 1902 by the opening of a post office, the name was changed back to Kenna in 1906. E.D. Kenna, the vice president of the railroad, may have contributed to the final choice of a name.

Kenna was one of the largest cattle shipping points in the state by 1909. At the peak of its development, the town had a bank, two hotels, several stores, a post office, and several saloons. By 1912, many homesteaders relinquished their claims due to the drought, and Kenna began to decline.

== See also ==
- Eastern New Mexico
- Llano Estacado
- Elida, New Mexico
- Tucumcari Mountain
- Lucianosaurus
