= Roosevelt County, New Mexico =

County in New Mexico, United States

- County
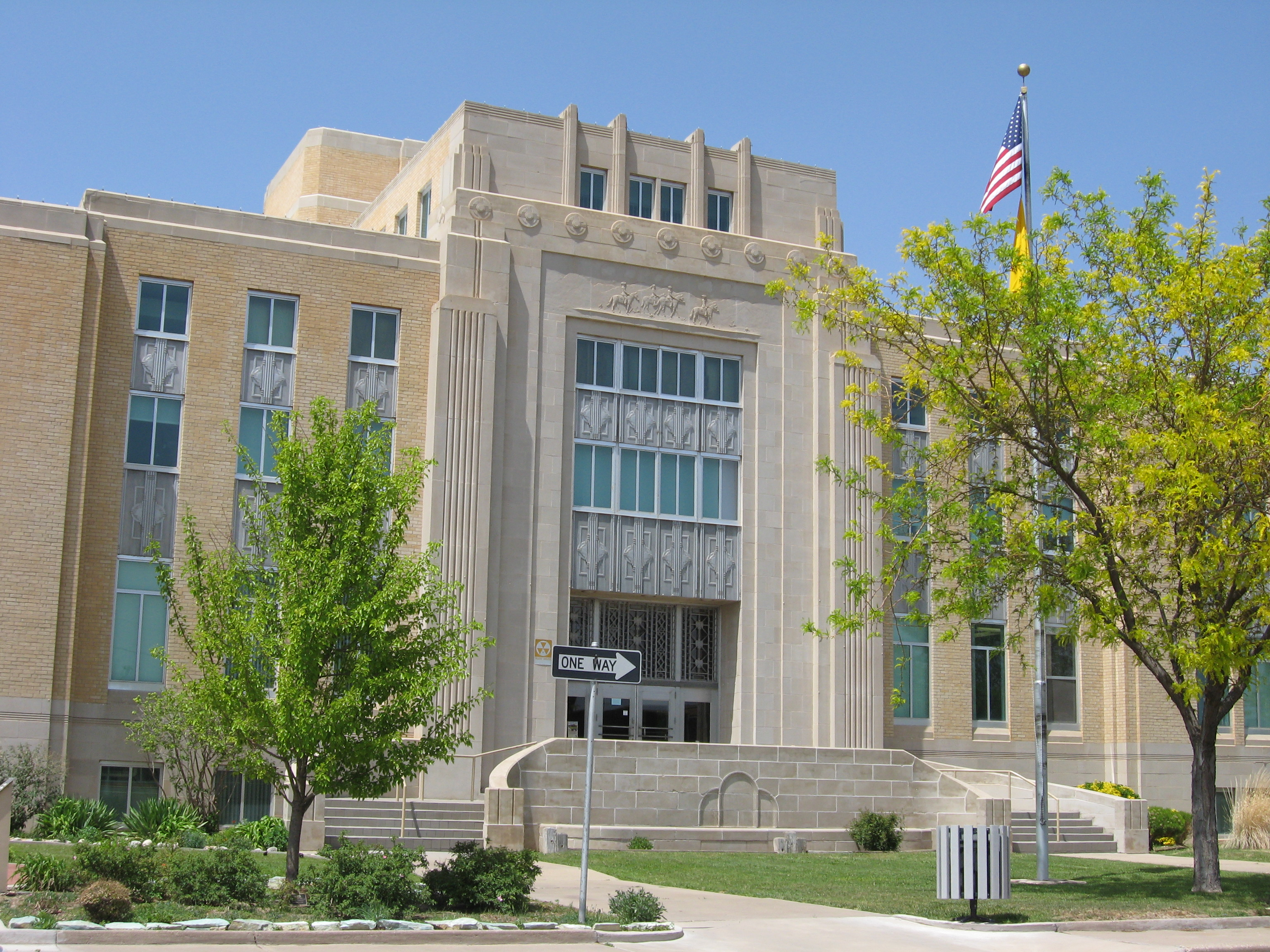
- Roosevelt County Courthouse in Portales

- Seal

- Location within the U.S. state of New Mexico
- Coordinates: 34°01′N 103°29′W
- Country: United States
- State: New Mexico
- Founded: February 28, 1903
- Named for: Theodore Roosevelt
- Seat: Portales
- Largest city: Portales

Area
  - Total: 2,455 sq mi (6,360 km^{2})
  - Land: 2,447 sq mi (6,340 km^{2})
  - Water: 7.2 sq mi (19 km^{2}) 0.3%

Population (2020)
  - Total: 19,191
  - Estimate (2025): 18,615 ▼
  - Density: 7.8/sq mi (3.0/km^{2})
- Time zone: UTC−7 (Mountain)
  - Summer (DST): UTC−6 (MDT)
- Congressional district: 3rd
- Website: www.rooseveltcounty.com

Roosevelt County is a county located in the U.S. state of New Mexico. As of the 2020 census, the population was 19,191. Its county seat is Portales. The county was created in 1903 from Chaves and Guadalupe counties and named for the then-current President of the United States, Theodore Roosevelt. The county's eastern border is the Texas state line. Roosevelt County comprises the Portales, NM Micropolitan Statistical Area, which is also included in the Clovis–Portales, NM Combined Statistical Area.

== Geography ==
According to the U.S. Census Bureau, the county has a total area of 2,455 square miles (6,360 km^{2}), of which 2,447 square miles (6,340 km^{2}) is land and 7.2 square miles (19 km^{2}) (0.3%) is water.

=== Adjacent counties ===
- Curry County - north
- Quay County - north
- De Baca County - west
- Chaves County - west
- Lea County - south
- Cochran County, Texas - southeast
- Bailey County, Texas - east

=== National protected area ===
- Grulla National Wildlife Refuge (part)

== History ==
In March 2026, the Republican House Speaker of Texas, Dan Burrows, filed interim charges to create a Texas state committee to study the legal and economic implications of a legal Texan annexation of Roosevelt County and neighboring Lea County. This followed an effort by two Republicans in the New Mexico Legislature to create a state amendment that would allow New Mexico's counties to vote on legal secession from the state. There is some support for this within the counties; such an annexation would transfer the Republican-majority counties from a Democratic-leaning state to a Republican-leaning one.

== Demographics ==
=== 2020 census ===
As of the 2020 census, the county had a population of 19,191. The median age was 31.8 years. 24.8% of residents were under the age of 18 and 14.5% of residents were 65 years of age or older. For every 100 females there were 99.0 males, and for every 100 females age 18 and over there were 97.5 males age 18 and over.

Roosevelt County, New Mexico – Racial and ethnic composition Note: the US Census treats Hispanic/Latino as an ethnic category. This table excludes Latinos from the racial categories and assigns them to a separate category. Hispanics/Latinos may be of any race.
| Race / Ethnicity (NH = Non-Hispanic) | Pop 2000 | Pop 2010 | Pop 2020 | % 2000 | % 2010 | % 2020 |
|---|---|---|---|---|---|---|
| White alone (NH) | 11,299 | 11,022 | 9,328 | 62.71% | 55.54% | 48.61% |
| Black or African American alone (NH) | 276 | 296 | 443 | 1.53% | 1.49% | 2.31% |
| Native American or Alaska Native alone (NH) | 151 | 181 | 163 | 0.84% | 0.91% | 0.85% |
| Asian alone (NH) | 97 | 161 | 173 | 0.54% | 0.81% | 0.90% |
| Pacific Islander alone (NH) | 7 | 3 | 18 | 0.04% | 0.02% | 0.09% |
| Other race alone (NH) | 17 | 21 | 114 | 0.09% | 0.11% | 0.59% |
| Mixed race or Multiracial (NH) | 173 | 249 | 555 | 0.96% | 1.25% | 2.89% |
| Hispanic or Latino (any race) | 5,998 | 7,913 | 8,397 | 33.29% | 39.87% | 43.75% |
| Total | 18,018 | 19,846 | 19,191 | 100.00% | 100.00% | 100.00% |

The racial makeup of the county was 62.1% White, 2.6% Black or African American, 1.3% American Indian and Alaska Native, 1.0% Asian, 0.1% Native Hawaiian and Pacific Islander, 16.8% from some other race, and 16.2% from two or more races. Hispanic or Latino residents of any race comprised 43.8% of the population.

63.6% of residents lived in urban areas, while 36.4% lived in rural areas.

There were 7,159 households in the county, of which 32.3% had children under the age of 18 living with them and 27.5% had a female householder with no spouse or partner present. About 29.9% of all households were made up of individuals and 11.2% had someone living alone who was 65 years of age or older.

There were 8,483 housing units, of which 15.6% were vacant. Among occupied housing units, 59.3% were owner-occupied and 40.7% were renter-occupied. The homeowner vacancy rate was 3.0% and the rental vacancy rate was 15.2%.

=== 2010 census ===
Historical population
| Census | Pop. | Note | %± |
|---|---|---|---|
| 1910 | 12,064 | | — |
| 1920 | 6,548 | | −45.7% |
| 1930 | 11,109 | | 69.7% |
| 1940 | 14,549 | | 31.0% |
| 1950 | 16,409 | | 12.8% |
| 1960 | 16,198 | | −1.3% |
| 1970 | 16,479 | | 1.7% |
| 1980 | 15,695 | | −4.8% |
| 1990 | 16,702 | | 6.4% |
| 2000 | 18,018 | | 7.9% |
| 2010 | 19,846 | | 10.1% |
| 2020 | 19,191 | | −3.3% |
| 2025 (est.) | 18,615 | ▼ | −3.0% |
U.S. Decennial Census; 1790-1960 1900-1990; 1990-2000 2010

As of the 2010 census, there were 19,846 people, 7,299 households, and 4,671 families living in the county. The population density was 8.1 inhabitants per square mile (3.1/km^{2}). There were 8,163 housing units at an average density of 3.3 per square mile (1.3/km^{2}). The racial makeup of the county was 76.9% white, 1.8% black or African American, 1.3% American Indian, 0.9% Asian, 15.9% from other races, and 3.2% from two or more races. Those of Hispanic or Latino origin made up 39.9% of the population. In terms of ancestry, 12.7% were German, 10.0% were American, 9.8% were English, and 9.3% were Irish.

Of the 7,299 households, 35.6% had children under the age of 18 living with them, 47.3% were married couples living together, 11.7% had a female householder with no husband present, 36.0% were non-families, and 28.3% of all households were made up of individuals. The average household size was 2.57 and the average family size was 3.20. The median age was 29.7 years.

The median income for a household in the county was $37,762 and the median income for a family was $43,536. Males had a median income of $37,719 versus $21,916 for females. The per capita income for the county was $16,933. About 16.0% of families and 22.8% of the population were below the poverty line, including 25.6% of those under age 18 and 14.3% of those age 65 or over.

=== 2000 census ===
As of the 2000 census, there were 18,018 people, 6,639 households, and 4,541 families living in the county. The population density was 7 inhabitants per square mile (2.7/km^{2}). There were 7,746 housing units at an average density of 3 per square mile (1.2/km^{2}). The racial makeup of the county was 74.14% White, 1.65% Black or African American, 1.10% Native American, 0.62% Asian, 0.07% Pacific Islander, 19.76% from other races, and 2.65% from two or more races. 33.29% of the population were Hispanic or Latino of any race.

There were 6,639 households, out of which 35.50% had children under the age of 18 living with them, 53.00% were married couples living together, 11.70% had a female householder with no husband present, and 31.60% were non-families. 24.70% of all households were made up of individuals, and 9.10% had someone living alone who was 65 years of age or older. The average household size was 2.60 and the average family size was 3.14.

In the county, the population was spread out, with 28.10% under the age of 18, 16.00% from 18 to 24, 25.50% from 25 to 44, 18.30% from 45 to 64, and 12.10% who were 65 years of age or older. The median age was 30 years. For every 100 females there were 96.50 males. For every 100 females age 18 and over, there were 93.50 males.

The median income for a household in the county was $26,586, and the median income for a family was $31,813. Males had a median income of $26,170 versus $20,684 for females. The per capita income for the county was $14,185. About 17.30% of families and 22.70% of the population were below the poverty line, including 25.10% of those under age 18 and 16.80% of those age 65 or over.

== Government and politics ==
The Roosevelt County clerk and deputy clerk resigned in late 2013 after the New Mexico Supreme Court ruled that all counties in the state must license same-sex marriages. County Manager Bill Cathey said they had resolved to quit "rather than be associated with that," according to the Associated Press.

Roosevelt County is heavily Republican. It has not voted for a Democratic presidential candidate since Lyndon B. Johnson in 1964. However, the county is located in the New Mexico's 3rd congressional district, represented by Democrat Teresa Leger Fernandez.

United States presidential election results for Roosevelt County, New Mexico
| Year | Republican | | Democratic | | Third party(ies) | |
| Year | No. | % | No. | % | No. | % |
|---|---|---|---|---|---|---|
| 1912 | 107 | 8.81% | 599 | 49.34% | 508 | 41.85% |
| 1916 | 230 | 15.55% | 1,088 | 73.56% | 161 | 10.89% |
| 1920 | 571 | 31.43% | 1,178 | 64.83% | 68 | 3.74% |
| 1924 | 398 | 19.54% | 1,340 | 65.78% | 299 | 14.68% |
| 1928 | 1,157 | 51.10% | 1,098 | 48.50% | 9 | 0.40% |
| 1932 | 475 | 13.95% | 2,826 | 83.02% | 103 | 3.03% |
| 1936 | 677 | 17.56% | 2,951 | 76.55% | 227 | 5.89% |
| 1940 | 1,384 | 30.15% | 3,190 | 69.50% | 16 | 0.35% |
| 1944 | 1,610 | 40.56% | 2,359 | 59.44% | 0 | 0.00% |
| 1948 | 956 | 23.46% | 3,087 | 75.75% | 32 | 0.79% |
| 1952 | 3,030 | 56.74% | 2,298 | 43.03% | 12 | 0.22% |
| 1956 | 2,708 | 54.56% | 2,247 | 45.28% | 8 | 0.16% |
| 1960 | 4,039 | 69.59% | 1,761 | 30.34% | 4 | 0.07% |
| 1964 | 2,732 | 48.49% | 2,875 | 51.03% | 27 | 0.48% |
| 1968 | 3,256 | 58.11% | 1,547 | 27.61% | 800 | 14.28% |
| 1972 | 4,727 | 73.03% | 1,612 | 24.90% | 134 | 2.07% |
| 1976 | 3,269 | 50.85% | 3,111 | 48.39% | 49 | 0.76% |
| 1980 | 3,950 | 60.92% | 2,240 | 34.55% | 294 | 4.53% |
| 1984 | 4,598 | 72.26% | 1,696 | 26.65% | 69 | 1.08% |
| 1988 | 3,589 | 63.18% | 2,033 | 35.79% | 59 | 1.04% |
| 1992 | 3,215 | 49.36% | 2,172 | 33.35% | 1,126 | 17.29% |
| 1996 | 3,245 | 55.29% | 2,097 | 35.73% | 527 | 8.98% |
| 2000 | 3,762 | 66.57% | 1,762 | 31.18% | 127 | 2.25% |
| 2004 | 4,997 | 69.95% | 2,082 | 29.14% | 65 | 0.91% |
| 2008 | 4,311 | 64.15% | 2,303 | 34.27% | 106 | 1.58% |
| 2012 | 4,043 | 67.73% | 1,727 | 28.93% | 199 | 3.33% |
| 2016 | 3,884 | 65.28% | 1,454 | 24.44% | 612 | 10.29% |
| 2020 | 4,634 | 70.13% | 1,802 | 27.27% | 172 | 2.60% |
| 2024 | 4,687 | 70.60% | 1,820 | 27.41% | 132 | 1.99% |

== Communities ==
=== City ===
- Portales (county seat)

=== Town ===
- Elida

=== Villages ===
- Causey
- Dora
- Floyd

=== Unincorporated communities ===
- Cameo
- Kenna
- Milnesand
- Pep
- Rogers

== Education ==
School districts include:

- Dora Consolidated Schools
- Elida Municipal Schools
- Floyd Municipal Schools
- House Municipal Schools
- Melrose Municipal Schools
- Portales Municipal Schools
- Texico Municipal Schools

== Transportation ==
=== Major highways ===
- US 60 / US 84
- US 70
- NM 88
- NM 89
- NM 114
- NM 202
- NM 206
- NM 235
- NM 236
- NM 258
- NM 262
- NM 267
- NM 321
- NM 330
- NM 348
- NM 458
- NM 467
- NM 480

== See also ==
- National Register of Historic Places listings in Roosevelt County, New Mexico
