= Causey, New Mexico =

- Village
- Location of Causey, New Mexico

- Location in the United States
- Coordinates: 33°51′01″N 103°07′44″W
- Country: United States
- State: New Mexico
- County: Roosevelt

Area
  - Total: 3.75 sq mi (9.71 km^{2})
  - Land: 3.75 sq mi (9.70 km^{2})
  - Water: 0.0039 sq mi (0.01 km^{2})
- Elevation: 4,026 ft (1,227 m)

Population (2020)
  - Total: 68
  - Density: 18.2/sq mi (7.01/km^{2})
- Time zone: UTC-7 (Mountain (MST))
  - Summer (DST): UTC-6 (MDT)
- ZIP code: 88113
- Area code: 575
- FIPS code: 35-12850
- GNIS feature ID: 2413538
- Website: causeynm.com

Causey is a village in eastern Roosevelt County, New Mexico, United States. As of the 2020 census, Causey had a population of 68.

== Geography ==
According to the United States Census Bureau, the village has a total area of 3.1 square miles (8.0 km^{2}), all land.

== Demographics ==
Historical population
Census	Pop.	Note	%±
1960	38		—
1970	150		294.7%
1980	81		−46.0%
1990	57		−29.6%
2000	52		−8.8%
2010	104		100.0%
2020	68		−34.6%
U.S. Decennial Census

As of the census of 2000, there were 52 people, 19 households, and 17 families residing in the village. The population density was 16.9 inhabitants per square mile (6.5/km^{2}). There were 23 housing units at an average density of 7.5 per square mile (2.9/km^{2}). The racial makeup of the village was 76.92% White, 9.62% Native American, 13.46% from other races. Hispanic or Latino of any race were 30.77% of the population.

There were 19 households, out of which 21.1% had children under the age of 18 living with them, 78.9% were married couples living together, 5.3% had a female householder with no husband present, and 10.5% were non-families. 10.5% of all households were made up of individuals, and 5.3% had someone living alone who was 65 years of age or older. The average household size was 2.74 and the average family size was 2.94.

In the village, the population was spread out, with 25.0% under the age of 18, 5.8% from 18 to 24, 19.2% from 25 to 44, 21.2% from 45 to 64, and 28.8% who were 65 years of age or older. The median age was 46 years. For every 100 females, there were 108.0 males. For every 100 females age 18 and over, there were 85.7 males.

The median income for a household in the village was $37,083, and the median income for a family was $37,083. Males had a median income of $21,250 versus $23,333 for females. The per capita income for the village was $19,663. None of the population and none of the families were below the poverty line.
