= Milnesand, New Mexico =

- Unincorporated community
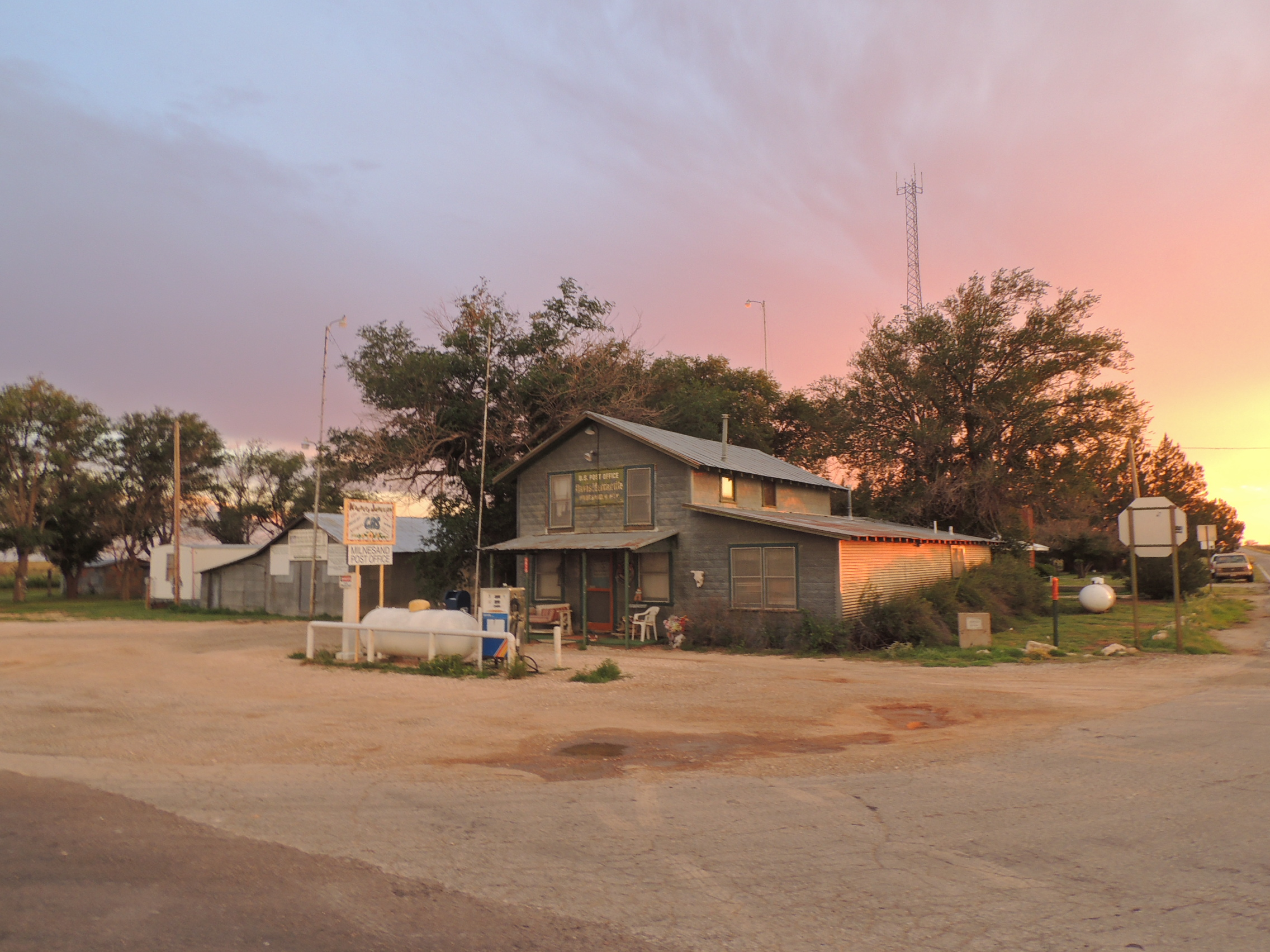
- The U.S. Post Office/gas station/general store in Milnesand, New Mexico in 2013

- Location within New Mexico
- Coordinates: 33°38′34″N 103°20′23″W
- Country: United States
- State: New Mexico
- County: Roosevelt

Milnesand is an unincorporated community in southern Roosevelt County, in the southeastern part of the U.S. state of New Mexico. The village is located approximately 35 miles south of Portales on New Mexico State Road 206. Milnesand is located on the Llano Estacado, a mesa that covers a large area in eastern New Mexico and west Texas.

The area around Milnesand has had a relatively low human population density in recent centuries due to the lack of perennial water across most of the Llano Estacado. The region likely supported a greater abundance of wildlife and game for indigenous people during wetter periods, as evidenced by Pleistocene era bison kill sites. The Milnesand Point (11,000 - 9,000 B.P.) is a Paleo-Indian projectile point that was first formally described from a site along Sulphur Draw near Milnesand. Native American tribes that inhabited the area included the Comanche and Apache. In the early 18th century, the Comanches expanded their territory into the Llano Estacado, displacing the Apaches who had previously lived there.

Milnesand was home to the High Plains Lesser Prairie-Chicken Festival which was held annually from 2002 to 2012. The town has earned the nickname "Prairie-chicken Capital of New Mexico" because of the abundance of lesser prairie-chickens that inhabit the shinnery oak prairie, which typifies much of the surrounding habitat. As such, Milnesand has been a regional hub for lesser prairie-chicken research and conservation.
