= Dora, New Mexico =

- Village
- Location of Dora, New Mexico

- Location in the United States
- Coordinates: 33°56′00″N 103°20′13″W
- Country: United States
- State: New Mexico
- County: Roosevelt

Area
  - Total: 2.60 sq mi (6.74 km^{2})
  - Land: 2.59 sq mi (6.72 km^{2})
  - Water: 0.012 sq mi (0.03 km^{2})
- Elevation: 4,305 ft (1,312 m)

Population (2020)
  - Total: 117
  - Density: 45.1/sq mi (17.42/km^{2})
- Time zone: UTC-7 (Mountain (MST))
  - Summer (DST): UTC-6 (MDT)
- ZIP code: 88115
- Area code: 575
- FIPS code: 35-21180
- GNIS feature ID: 2413547
- Website: villageofdoranm.com

Dora is a village in Roosevelt County, New Mexico, United States. The population was 117 at the 2020 census.

== Geography ==
According to the United States Census Bureau, the village has a total area of 2.8 square miles (7.3 km^{2}), all land.

== Demographics ==
Historical population
Census	Pop.	Note	%±
1960	113		—
1970	196		73.5%
1980	168		−14.3%
1990	167		−0.6%
2000	130		−22.2%
2010	133		2.3%
2020	117		−12.0%
U.S. Decennial Census

As of the census of 2000, there were 130 people, 43 households, and 36 families residing in the village. The population density was 46.2 inhabitants per square mile (17.8/km^{2}). There were 52 housing units at an average density of 18.5 per square mile (7.1/km^{2}). The racial makeup of the village was 86.15% White, 2.31% Native American, 11.54% from other races. Hispanic or Latino of any race were 20.77% of the population.

There were 43 households, out of which 53.5% had children under the age of 18 living with them, 74.4% were married couples living together, 9.3% had a female householder with no husband present, and 14.0% were non-families. 14.0% of all households were made up of individuals, and 7.0% had someone living alone who was 65 years of age or older. The average household size was 3.02 and the average family size was 3.35.

In the village, the population was spread out, with 37.7% under the age of 18, 4.6% from 18 to 24, 24.6% from 25 to 44, 20.8% from 45 to 64, and 12.3% who were 65 years of age or older. The median age was 33 years. For every 100 females, there were 85.7 males. For every 100 females age 18 and over, there were 88.4 males.

The median income for a household in the village was $38,333, and the median income for a family was $40,417. Males had a median income of $28,750 versus $21,250 for females. The per capita income for the village was $17,831. There were 10.8% of families and 8.7% of the population living below the poverty line, including 8.0% of under eighteens and 5.6% of those over 64.

== Notable people ==
- Larry Hays, Texas Tech Red Raiders baseball coach, attended school in Dora.
