= Mayhill, New Mexico =

- Location within the state of New Mexico
- Coordinates: 32°53′27″N 105°29′52″W
- Country: United States
- State: New Mexico
- County: Otero
- Elevation: 6,700 ft (2,000 m)
- Time zone: UTC-7 (MST)
  - Summer (DST): UTC-6 (MDT)
- GNIS feature ID: 2584153

Mayhill is an unincorporated community in Otero County, New Mexico, United States. As of the 2020 census, Mayhill had a population of 96.

It is surrounded by the Lincoln National Forest on the eastern slope of the Sacramento Mountains, at the confluence of James Canyon and Rio Penasco, approximately 17 miles (27 km) east of Cloudcroft.

== Education ==
Mayhill is in the Cloudcroft Municipal Schools district.
