= Tatum, New Mexico =

- Town
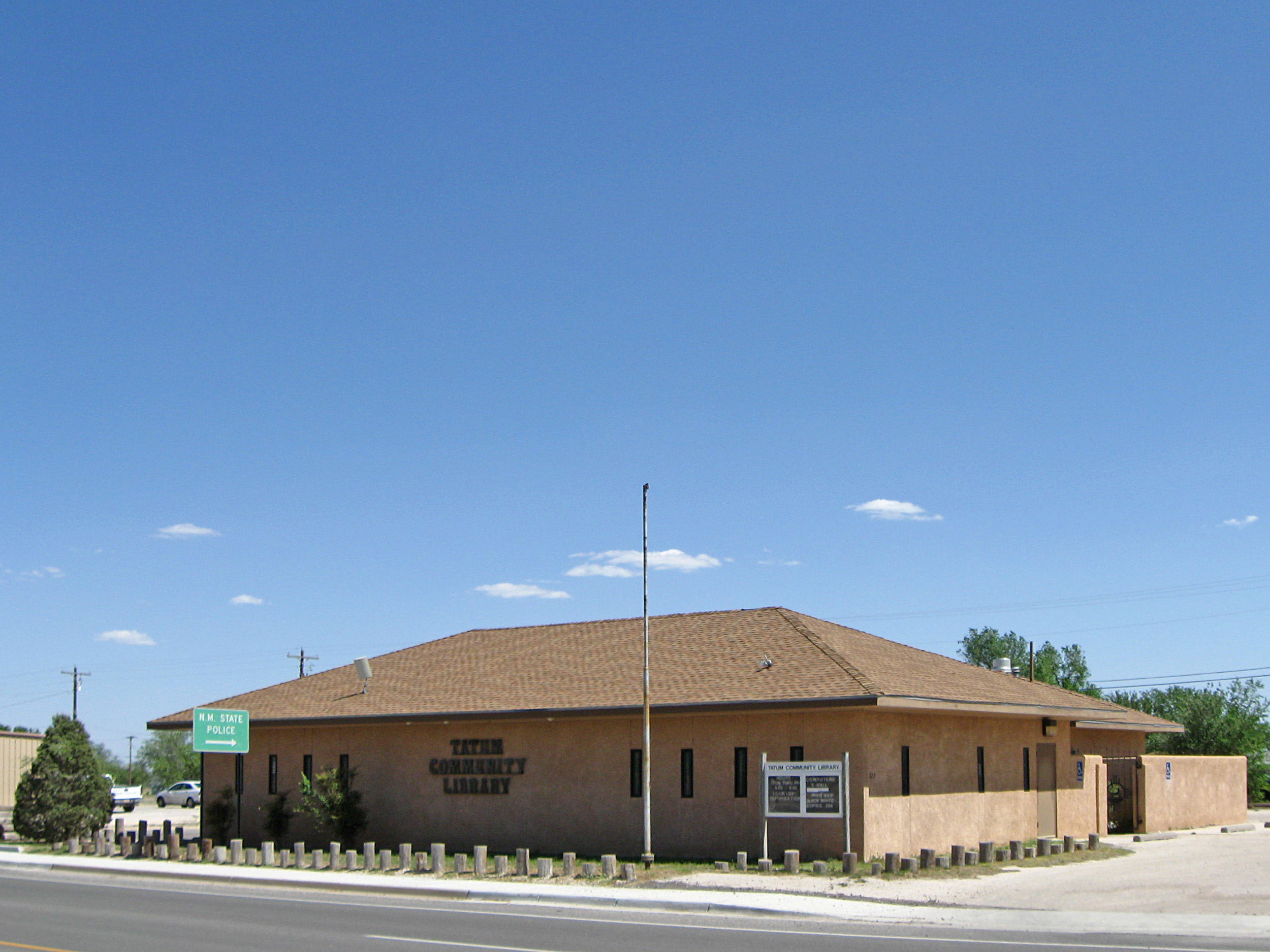
- Tatum Community Library, May 2009

- Location of Tatum in Lea County

- Locations of Tatum in New Mexico Location in the United States
- Coordinates: 33°15′19″N 103°18′40″W
- Country: United States
- State: New Mexico
- County: Lea

Area
  - Total: 1.59 sq mi (4.12 km^{2})
  - Land: 1.59 sq mi (4.11 km^{2})
  - Water: 0.0077 sq mi (0.02 km^{2})
- Elevation: 3,996 ft (1,218 m)

Population (2020)
  - Total: 706
  - Density: 445.4/sq mi (171.96/km^{2})
- Time zone: UTC-7 (Mountain (MST))
  - Summer (DST): UTC-6 (MDT)
- ZIP codes: 88213, 88267
- Area code: 575
- FIPS code: 35-76620
- GNIS feature ID: 2413367
- Website: townoftatum.org

Tatum is a town in Lea County, New Mexico, United States. As of the 2020 census, Tatum had a population of 706.

== Geography ==
Tatum is located in northern Lea County. U.S. Route 380 passes through the town, leading west 72 miles (116 km) to Roswell and east 30 miles (48 km) to Plains, Texas. New Mexico State Road 206 crosses US 380 in the center of Tatum, leading north 65 miles (105 km) to Portales and south 22 miles (35 km) to Lovington, the Lea county seat.

According to the United States Census Bureau, Tatum has a total area of 1.6 square miles (4.1 km^{2}), of which 0.01 square miles (0.02 km^{2}), or 0.47%, are water.

== Climate ==
According to the Köppen Climate Classification system, Tatum has a cold semi-arid climate, abbreviated "BSk" on climate maps. The hottest temperature recorded in Tatum was 115 °F (46.1 °C) on June 28, 1994, while the coldest temperature recorded was −16 °F (−26.7 °C) on January 11, 1962, and January 13, 1963.

Climate data for Tatum, New Mexico, 1991–2020 normals, extremes 1919–2016
Month	Jan	Feb	Mar	Apr	May	Jun	Jul	Aug	Sep	Oct	Nov	Dec	Year
Record high °F (°C)	82 (28)	86 (30)	92 (33)	97 (36)	107 (42)	115 (46)	110 (43)	107 (42)	105 (41)	98 (37)	86 (30)	82 (28)	115 (46)
Mean maximum °F (°C)	72.7 (22.6)	76.9 (24.9)	83.2 (28.4)	89.0 (31.7)	96.3 (35.7)	101.4 (38.6)	100.7 (38.2)	98.9 (37.2)	95.3 (35.2)	88.6 (31.4)	80.1 (26.7)	73.0 (22.8)	103.9 (39.9)
Mean daily maximum °F (°C)	54.7 (12.6)	59.5 (15.3)	66.9 (19.4)	75.2 (24.0)	83.5 (28.6)	92.2 (33.4)	92.5 (33.6)	91.7 (33.2)	84.4 (29.1)	75.5 (24.2)	63.4 (17.4)	55.0 (12.8)	74.5 (23.6)
Daily mean °F (°C)	39.0 (3.9)	43.1 (6.2)	49.8 (9.9)	57.5 (14.2)	66.9 (19.4)	76.0 (24.4)	78.1 (25.6)	77.0 (25.0)	69.7 (20.9)	59.4 (15.2)	47.3 (8.5)	39.7 (4.3)	58.6 (14.8)
Mean daily minimum °F (°C)	23.2 (−4.9)	26.7 (−2.9)	32.6 (0.3)	39.7 (4.3)	50.3 (10.2)	59.9 (15.5)	63.6 (17.6)	62.3 (16.8)	55.0 (12.8)	43.4 (6.3)	31.1 (−0.5)	24.5 (−4.2)	42.7 (5.9)
Mean minimum °F (°C)	9.8 (−12.3)	12.0 (−11.1)	16.6 (−8.6)	26.1 (−3.3)	37.4 (3.0)	50.2 (10.1)	56.6 (13.7)	55.0 (12.8)	42.3 (5.7)	29.0 (−1.7)	16.6 (−8.6)	9.2 (−12.7)	5.2 (−14.9)
Record low °F (°C)	−16 (−27)	−15 (−26)	−4 (−20)	10 (−12)	25 (−4)	33 (1)	42 (6)	42 (6)	28 (−2)	11 (−12)	0 (−18)	−8 (−22)	−16 (−27)
Average precipitation inches (mm)	0.45 (11)	0.41 (10)	0.79 (20)	0.70 (18)	1.86 (47)	1.74 (44)	2.24 (57)	2.11 (54)	2.52 (64)	1.19 (30)	0.65 (17)	0.58 (15)	15.24 (387)
Average snowfall inches (cm)	1.3 (3.3)	1.1 (2.8)	0.3 (0.76)	0.0 (0.0)	0.0 (0.0)	0.0 (0.0)	0.0 (0.0)	0.0 (0.0)	0.0 (0.0)	0.1 (0.25)	0.9 (2.3)	2.4 (6.1)	6.1 (15.51)
Average precipitation days (≥ 0.01 in)	2.2	2.6	3.1	2.1	4.5	4.8	6.1	5.8	5.6	4.6	3.2	2.9	47.5
Average snowy days (≥ 0.1 in)	1.1	1.2	0.3	0.1	0.0	0.0	0.0	0.0	0.0	0.1	0.6	1.3	4.7
Source 1: NOAA
Source 2: National Weather Service (mean maxima/minima 1981–2010)

== Demographics ==
Historical population
Census	Pop.	Note	%±
1950	688		—
1960	1,168		69.8%
1970	982		−15.9%
1980	896		−8.8%
1990	768		−14.3%
2000	683		−11.1%
2010	798		16.8%
2020	706		−11.5%
U.S. Decennial Census

As of the census of 2000, there were 683 people, 267 households, and 194 families residing in the town. The population density was 578.8 inhabitants per square mile (223.5/km^{2}). There were 391 housing units at an average density of 331.3 per square mile (127.9/km^{2}). The racial makeup of the town was 65.45% White, 1.02% African American, 0.59% Native American, 0.15% Pacific Islander, 30.31% from other races, and 2.49% from two or more races. Hispanic or Latino of any race were 37.34% of the population.

There were 267 households, out of which 31.5% had children under the age of 18 living with them, 61.0% were married couples living together, 7.9% had a female householder with no husband present, and 27.3% were non-families. 25.8% of all households were made up of individuals, and 12.4% had someone living alone who was 65 years of age or older. The average household size was 2.56 and the average family size was 3.08.

In the town, the population was spread out, with 28.1% under the age of 18, 6.9% from 18 to 24, 25.5% from 25 to 44, 23.7% from 45 to 64, and 15.8% who were 65 years of age or older. The median age was 38 years. For every 100 females, there were 96.8 males. For every 100 females age 18 and over, there were 95.6 males.

The median income for a household in the town was $28,833, and the median income for a family was $33,393. Males had a median income of $31,111 versus $19,750 for females. The per capita income for the town was $11,728. About 16.6% of families and 18.7% of the population were below the poverty line, including 21.8% of those under age 18 and 21.6% of those age 65 or over.

== Transportation ==
=== Airport ===
Tatum Airport is a town-owned, public-use airport located three nautical miles (6 km) east of the central business district of Tatum.

=== Major roads ===
- U.S. Route 380
- State Road 206

== See also ==
- List of municipalities in New Mexico
