= List of Texas tornadoes =

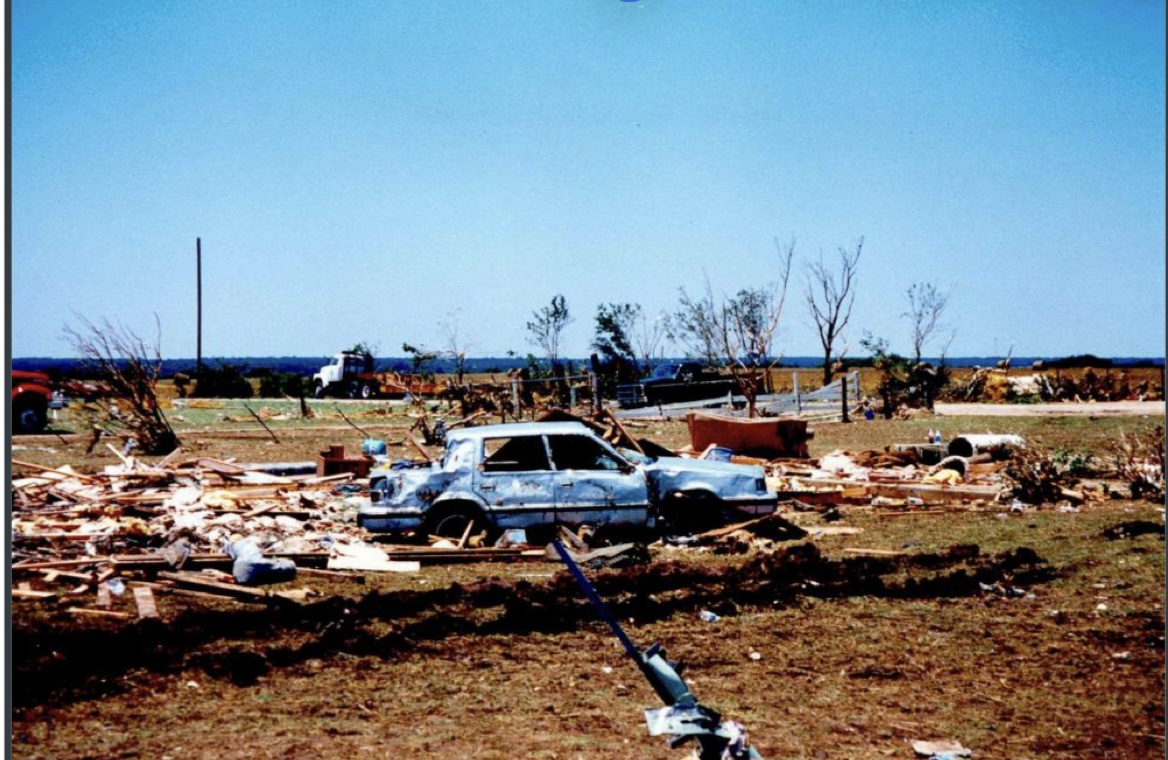
The aftermath of the 1997 Jarrell tornado, which killed 27 people

Several destructive, strong and deadly tornadoes have formed in the U.S. state of Texas, which experiences on average 137 tornadoes per year, since 1878, the year with the first recorded instance in the state.

== Climatology ==
Each year on average, 137 tornadoes touch down in Texas, the most of any U.S. state. Its position next to the Gulf of Mexico provides the required moisture to generate tornadoes any month out of the year.

== Events ==
FU	F0	F1	F2	F3	F4	F5
0+	10+	2+	3+	1+	6	5

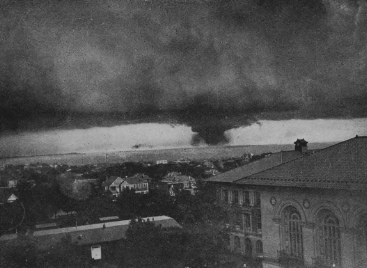
The second of the 1922 Austin twin tornadoes.

=== Pre-1950 ===
- January 26, 1879 – An F2 tornado hit Lockhart, killing one and injuring 15.
- January 31, 1879 – An F2 tornado hit New Braunfels, killing one and injuring 15.
- September 2, 1879 – A brief, narrow F1 tornado knocked down two beehives and bent down vegetation in Houston's Hubertus Garden.
- May 28, 1880 – A violent F4 tornado hit Savoy, Texas, killing 14 people and injuring 60 more and nearly wiping out the town. Witnesses described the tornado as "a funnel blazing with balls of fire".
- May 6, 1882 – An F2 tornado hit Marshall, killing one and injuring five.
- April 27, 1883 – An estimated F4 tornado hit Belton, destroying 3 homes and scattering debris for over a mile. Five people died: three in Midway and two north of Belton. A half-hour later, an F2 hit Milano, killing one.
- June 3, 1883 – An F2 tornado hit Greenville, killing one and injuring five.
- November 5, 1885 – An F3 tornado hit Avinger, killing five and injuring seven.
- May 4, 1890 – An F3 tornado hit Acton, damaging much of the town but causing no deaths.
- May 31, 1892 – An F4 tornado devastated Temple, killing 10. A newspaper described the tornado as "the whirling tiger of the air".
- December 6, 1892 – An estimated F4 tornado hit Atlanta, killing as many as 15.
- April 28, 1893 – At least 23 die when an F4 tornado hit Cisco, damaging or leveling much of the town. A train was thrown some 80-200 feet from the tracks.
- March 17-18, 1894 – Several strong tornadoes touch down, including a narrow, but devastating F4 that hit the western side of Emory, killing 4 and injuring 40. This tornado may have also injured another five in Sulphur Springs as an F2. An F3 killed 8 east of Longview, an F2 killed one in Lufkin, and another four died in Nacogdoches when two tornadoes (an F3 and an F2) hit both western and eastern sides of town. Another F2 killed one (possibly two) near Celeste.
- May 15, 1896 – Part of a larger outbreak, a destructive F5 tornado ravaged Sherman, destroying large portions of the town and killing an estimated 73 people.
- April 30, 1898 – An F4 tornado hit Mobeetie, killing seven and injuring 35.
- March 11, 1902 – A brief F2 tornado killed one person near Downtown Houston.
- May 18, 1902 – An F4 tornado touched down in the city of Goliad, killing 114 people. This made it the deadliest tornado in state history, later tied by the 1953 Waco tornado. The same day, an F2 killed three in Fairfield.
- July 5, 1905 – Unusual for Texas at this time of year, an F4 tornado tore through Montague County and devastated several rural communities, killing 18.
- April 26, 1906 – An F4 tornado hit Bellevue, killing 17.
- February 8, 1909 – An F2 tornado killed one while on a 6.7 mile path from south of Dayton to east of Liberty.
- May 30, 1909 – An F4 tornado devastated Zephyr, killing at least 34.
- April 20, 1912 – Part of a larger outbreak, several strong tornadoes touched down in North Texas, killing seven, from an F3 and two F4s. An F1 killed one in Taylor.
- April 27, 1912 – A long-tracked F4 tornado destroyed at least 30 homes in six communities in Rusk and Panola counties, killing 4.
- April 9, 1919 – Four F4 tornadoes touched down in various areas of Texas, killing 64 people and injuring hundreds of others. The deadliest of these tornadoes tracked through Wood County, destroying rural communities and causing an estimated $450,000 (1919 USD) in damages.
- April 13, 1921 – An F4 devastated the central and eastern portions of Melissa, killing 11 and destroying every church in town and the entire business district except for the bank. Some homes and farms were swept away.
- April 15, 1921 – A tornado family (including some F4s) traveled on a 112 mile path across northeast Texas into southwestern Arkansas. Six died in Avinger and two more in Marion County.
- May 4, 1922 – An F2 and then an F4 tornado struck Austin, killing an estimated 12-13 people and causing $300,000 (1922 USD) or more in damages. Both were widely photographed, and caused extensive damage to Austin.
- May 14, 1923 – A massive F5 tornado swept away ranch homes across Howard and Mitchell counties, killing 23.
- August 22, 1925 – An F1 tornado killed two and injured nine in Kemah. The tornado began as a waterspout before moving onshore.
- April 13, 1927 – A mile-wide F5 tornado destroyed much of Rocksprings, killing 72; another two were killed near Leakey when the tornado "skipped" into Real County. This tornado is the southernmost F5 to hit the United States.
- May 9, 1927 – Three F4 tornadoes touched down in the counties of Collin, Hunt and Dallas, killing 40 people and completely destroying numerous buildings and structures. The deadliest, which killed 19, hit Nevada and destroyed up to a half of the town.
- October 29, 1929 – An F2 tornado tore across the eastern side of Houston, injuring five.
- May 6, 1930 – A tornado outbreak across eastern Texas killed at least 81, most of which were from two F4s. One wiped out the town of Frost, killing at least 22. The second F4 killed 36, most of them tenant farmers in poorly built homes near Kenedy, Runge and Nordheim. An F2 killed one north of Gonzales, an F1 killed one in Converse, and another F2 killed two near Bronson.
- November 15, 1930 – An F2 tornado killed one and injured two in western Houston.
- June 10, 1938 – A slow-moving F5 tornado with an unusual boomerang-shaped track struck the west side of Clyde, killing 14, including four when their car was picked up by the tornado.
- December 12, 1940 – An F2 tornado destroyed two farm homes north of Katy, killing one person and injuring another. A couple in the other house escaped in time before the tornado struck.
- April 28, 1942 – An F4 (likely an F5) tornado destroyed parts of Crowell, killing 11 and injuring 250.
- August 27, 1945 – During the 1945 Texas hurricane, an F3 tornado touched down in northeast Houston and travelled for 22 miles across northern Houston, killing one and injuring 15. Some 14 homes were hit with five completely swept away. The single fatality was a man who refused to evacuate in advance of the approaching hurricane. Tornado damage estimated at $35,000.
- January 4, 1946 – Part of a larger outbreak, multiple strong tornadoes touched down in East Texas. An F3 hit Clawson, killing three while Nacogdoches and Appleby were hit hard by an F4 that killed 10; Texas A&M University states that these two tornadoes were one and the same, with a death toll of 13. A second F4 touched down near Log Lake and moved northeast towards Palestine, killing 15. The National Weather Service office in Amarillo lists this tornado as one of the worst in Texas history. One survivor reported the sound of the tornado as a "freight train like roar". An F2 killed eight on a path from St. Paul to Shiloh. 24-25 people were injured from two other F2s.
- April 9, 1947 – A long-tracked, large (up to 2 miles wide at times), and fast-moving F5 tornado destroyed Glazier and much of Higgins, killing at least 68 in Texas.
- May 15, 1949 – An estimated F4 tornado hit Amarillo, killing seven and injuring 82. This tornado remains the strongest and costliest in Amarillo. Another estimated F4 injured three in Stratford before crossing into Oklahoma.

=== 1950–1959 ===
FU	F0	F1	F2	F3	F4	F5
0	10±	20±	7+	5+	4±	1

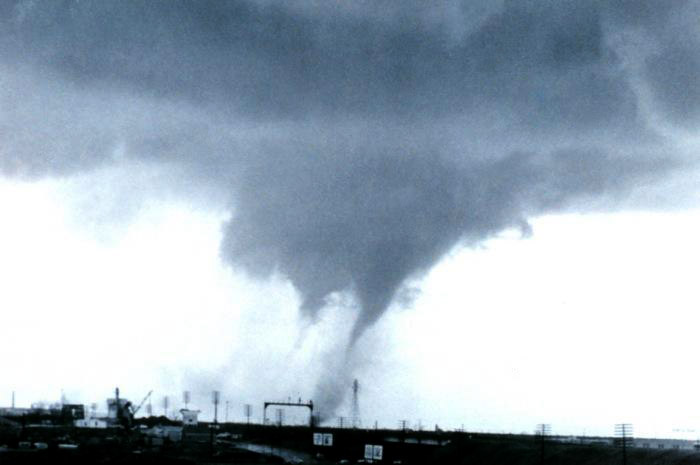
The April 2, 1957 Dallas multi-vortex tornado

- February 11-12, 1950 – Several tornadoes touched down in East and Southeast Texas. An F3 killed a woman in her 100s in western La Porte (Harris County) and another F3 killed a second person in Bowie County. On the 12th, an F3 leveled a home in Fellowship, killing two and injuring at least another 32. The tornado also caused damage in Jericho before crossing into Louisiana.
- April 28, 1950 – An F4 tornado tore through Clyde, killing 5. 21 homes were completely destroyed by this tornado.
- March 12, 1952 – An F2 tornado touched down in Carthage, causing extensive damage to homes and injuring 2 people. The tornado is estimated to have caused $25,000 (1953 USD) in damages.
- March 13, 1952 – A large and violent F4 tornado tracked through Haskell County, killing 17 people and injuring another 25. The tornado caused $5 million (1953 USD) in damages.
- April 28, 1953 – An F3 tornado hit Smithville, destroying multiple poorly built homes and injuring 3 people. Another F3 tornado tracked through Hays County, destroying up to four homes. 1 person was killed, and it was estimated that the tornado caused $250,000 (1953 USD) in damages. A destructive and violent F4 tornado also tracked through Bexar County, hitting suburban areas of San Antonio and killing 2 people.
- May 11, 1953 – Amid a larger outbreak, three tornadoes touched down across the state, including an F5 that struck Waco in McLennan County, killing 114 people and injuring 597 others. This made it the deadliest tornado in state history, along with the 1902 Goliad tornado. Across Waco, the tornado damaged or destroyed more than 1,600 buildings.
- December 1, 1953 – An F3 tornado touched down near Seguin, destroying seven houses and injuring 10 people. The tornado caused $250,000 (1953 USD) in damages.
- December 2, 1953 – An F3 tornado touched down near Tanglewood, destroying three houses and two churches. 4 people were injured. An F2 tornado hit Lane City, shifting two farmhouses off of their foundations and inflicting crop damage. Another deadly F2 tornado hit areas near Navasota, completely destroying a house with 2 people inside, instantly killing both. Multiple farmhouses and barns were also heavily damaged and destroyed. A tornado briefly inflicted F1 damage to Pollok, and three houses were unroofed with a garage heavily damaged. An F2 tornado struck Brazos County, destroying a house.
- May 25, 1955 – An F4 tornado tracked through Collingsworth and Wheeler counties, destroying thirteen farmhouses and killing 2. Damage caused by the tornado was estimated to be $500,000 (1955 USD). Another brief F0 tornado touched down near Sterling City before lifting. An F1 tornado was observed near Rotan, and an F2 tornado damaged two houses near Benjamin. Another F2 briefly touched down in the Wichita Falls area, causing damage to trees.
- May 26, 1955 – A brief F0 tornado touched down near Corsicana, causing little damage to crops.
- March 17, 1957 – A tornado outbreak hit the Greater Houston and Beaumont-Port Arthur areas. An F2 hit Santa Fe and Dickinson, injuring four. Another F2 hit the northwest side of Texas City, killing one and injuring seven. A third F2 moved over Galveston Bay near Goat Island as a waterspout, injuring four. A final F2 hit Groves, causing no casualties.
- April 2, 1957 – A brief tornado inflicted F0 damage on crops in Cooke County. An F2 tornado damaged multiple houses near Howe, and 2 people were injured. The tornado caused an estimated $25,000 (1957 USD) in damages. Another F2 tornado touched down in Montague County, destroying a church and a warehouse. One person was injured when the building they were sheltering in collapsed. A brief F0 tornado also inflicted minimal damage to crops near Grapevine. An F0 tornado in Grayson County destroyed multiple houses and caused crop damage. A long-tracked F3 tornado hit Melissa, destroying over 10 homes and injuring four people. The tornado caused $500,000 (1957 USD) in damages, and was part of a larger tornado family. An F3 tornado tore through Western Dallas, causing $2.5 million (1957 USD) in damages and killing 10 people. An F2 tornado tracked through Lamar County, destroying multiple homes and outbuildings and killing one person. Another F2 tornado damaged multiple barns and killed hundreds of cattle in Wheeler County. An F3 tornado struck Newark, directly impacting a school and destroying 11 poorly built homes. Two people were injured. A brief but strong F2 tornado also destroyed a rodeo arena and a K-Bar Ranch. An F1 tornado tracked through rural Denton County, damaging a few homes and barns. A tornado hit Ben Franklin, inflicting F2 damage to a home and killing one person.
- April 3, 1957 – A brief and weak F0 tornado impacted Kaufman County, and a brief F1 tornado touched down near Woodlawn. Three brief F0 tornadoes tracked through Denton, Tarrant and Dallas counties, causing little damage to crops. An F2 tornado touched down near Lone Star, damaging multiple structures. Another brief F2 tornado tracked through Harrison County, causing minor damage to sheds and trees. A brief F1 tornado also tracked through Orange County, damaging a school and multiple houses. A brief F2 tornado touched down in Shelby County, damaging multiple structures.
- May 24, 1957 – A long-tracked F2 tornado hit Bovina, damaging an orchard and multiple buildings. The tornado caused a traffic accident that injured multiple people. A brief F0 tornado touched down in Bailey County, and another F0 tornado was documented in Deaf Smith County. A strong F3 tornado hit areas near Sudan, damaging or destroying up to 77 homes. 3 people were injured. Another long-tracked tornado hit Lynn, Lubbock and Crosby counties, damaging over 120 buildings. One person was injured, the total length of the tornado path was 50 miles. A brief F1 tornado hit Cotton Center, damaging multiple homes. An F0 tornado was documented in Hale County, and another F0 tornado tracked through rural Potter County. A brief but strong F3 tornado hit Lenorah, destroying 5 homes and injuring one person. A brief F2 tornado impacted areas near Midland, destroying several farmhouses and downing a utility pole. An F1 tornado also touched down in Baylor County, causing little damage.
- May 25, 1957 – A brief F0 tornado touched down near Oak Trail Shores, hitting a ranch but causing minimal damage. An F1 tornado also impacted areas near Lometa, damaging a carport.
- June 22, 1957 – A brief F0 tornado caused little damage in Yoakum County. An F1 tornado also briefly touched down in Hale County, damaging several structures.
- November 7, 1957 – Another tornado outbreak affected Beaumont-Port Arthur. An F2 hit Port Acres, damaging 15 homes and destroying five others, but only causing one injury. An F3 hit Groves, causing major damage and killing two. An F4 (possibly a high-end F3) hit northern Orange, killing one.
- April 2, 1958 – Part of a larger, multi-state outbreak, an F3 tornado hit Wichita Falls, killing one and injuring 14. A second F3 hit Stoneburg, injuring one.
- March 31, 1959 – Part of a larger outbreak, a violent mile-wide F4 tornado destroyed Aquilla and Vaughan and devastated the south half of Hillsboro, killing seven and injuring 31.

=== 1960–1969 ===
FU	F0	F1	F2	F3	F4	F5
9	11+	6+	10+	8+	1	1

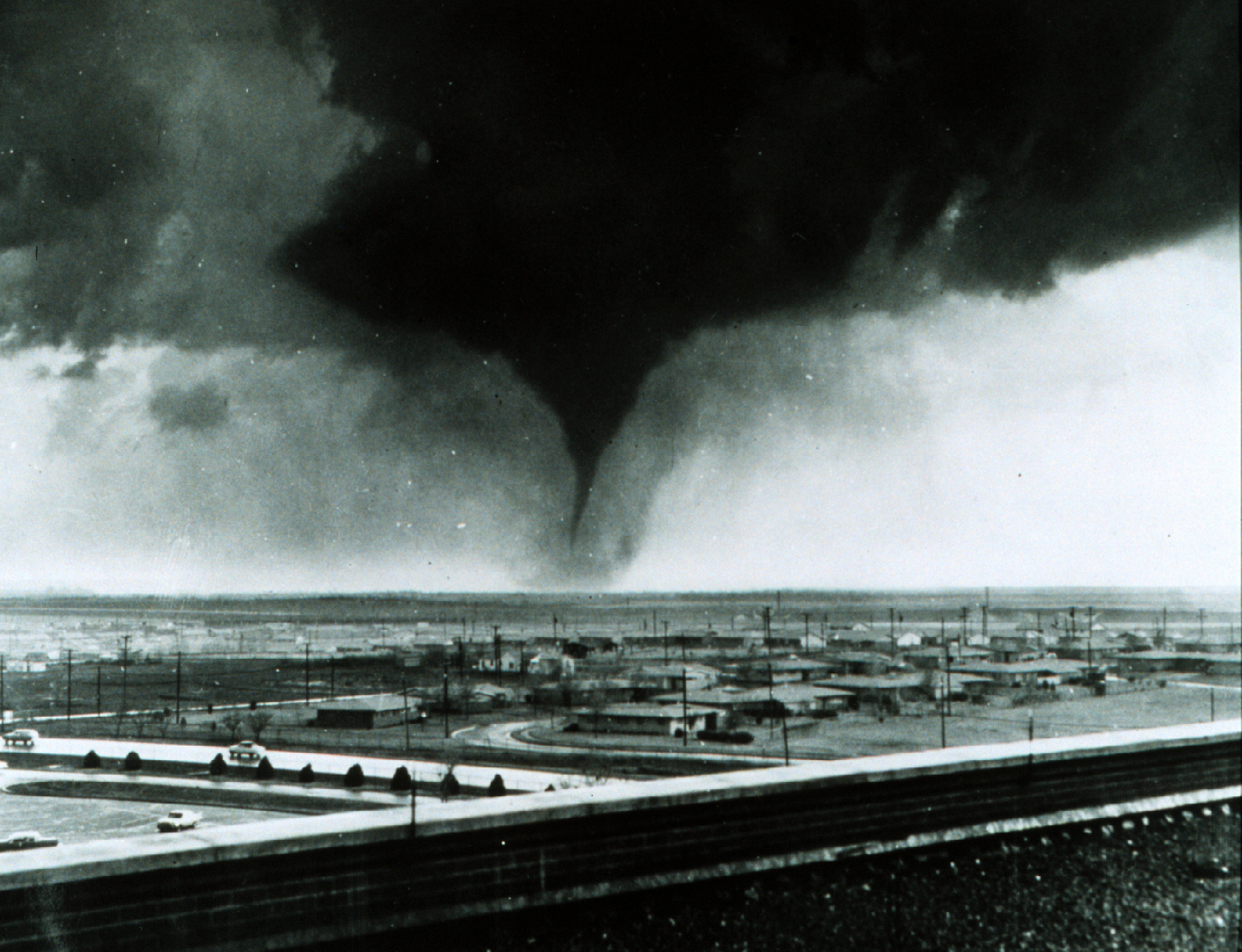
An F5 tornado in Wichita Falls in 1964.

- May 4, 1960 – Multiple low-rated tornadoes touched down across Texas, including an F1 tornado that caused minor damage to Flower Mound and an F2 tornado that hit Dublin. An F3 tornado hit Tarrant County, destroying 8 homes.
- May 5, 1960 – 3 tornadoes touched down, including two brief F0 tornadoes in Dallas County and an F2 tornado in Harrison County that only did minor damage to vehicles.
- April 23, 1961 – A brief F1 tornado struck Union, causing $2,500 (1961 USD) in damages.
- April 27, 1961 – An F2 tornado hit Marion touched down for an estimated 30 seconds, destroying multiple structures, including a steel marina.
- April 29, 1961 – A small F2 tornado was observed near Corpus Christi, causing $25,000 (1961 USD) in damages. A fruit stand that was in the path of the tornado was completely destroyed, and a house was damaged.
- May 3, 1961 – Multiple tornadoes hit the Texas panhandle, including an F2 tornado in Dougherty that destroyed barns and buildings. Two brief F0 tornadoes were also observed, one in Silverton and the other was a twin of the Dougherty tornado.
- May 4, 1961 – An F0 tornado was reported in Canadian, and an F2 tornado touched down near Bogata, heavily damaging multiple barns and vehicles. An F3 tornado was reported outside of Fort Stockton, causing $250,000 (1961 USD) in damages. A brief F0 tornado also touched down near Paducah, causing no damage.
- May 7, 1961 – A damaging F3 tornado hit Stamford, destroying up to 4 homes and tossing a 4-foot-long portion of brick wall over 0.25 miles away. The tornado was estimated to have caused $250,000 (1961 USD) in damages. A relatively weak and brief F0 tornado also touched down near Seymour, causing little damage.
- September 11, 1961 – A brief but devastating F3 tornado hit Channelview during Hurricane Carla, destroying 18 homes and 6 commercial buildings and injuring 22 people.
- September 12, 1961 – A short-lived but deadly F4 tornado struck downtown Galveston during Hurricane Carla, killing eight. It began as a waterspout over the Gulf before moving inland and "was probably the most intense tornado to hit Galveston". One of only two F4s spawned by a hurricane and one of only two F4s to hit the Greater Houston area. Three hours later an F3 touched down, destroying six homes along a two mile path but causing no casualties. Grazulis rated this tornado as an F2.
- May 17, 1962 – A destructive F2 tornado hit Pecos, destroying a church and causing heavy damage to a smokestack. Multiple houses were also damaged or destroyed, and the tornado caused $250,000 in damages. A brief F0 tornado also touched down in Pecos, causing little damage.
- May 20, 1962 – A relatively strong tornado touched down outside of Vernon, destroying a poorly built structure at F2 intensity and downing various power lines. It caused an unknown amount of damage, and no fatalities were reported. An F1 tornado also struck Matador, destroying multiple sheds and uprooting trees.
- May 25, 1962 – A deadly and destructive F3 tornado tore through Radium, destroying six houses and multiple barns. A woman was killed when the house she was sheltering in took a direct hit, and she was found over 200 yards away from her property. A brief F0 tornado and another F1 tornado were documented in Jones County, causing little damage.
- May 26, 1962 – An F4 tornado hit Haskell, injuring one person and causing $2.5 million (1962 USD) in damages. An F1 and F2 tornado also followed, both hitting Haskell. A brief tornado also touched down near Rotan, inflicting F1 damage on trees.
- May 27, 1962 – A brief but strong F2 tornado hit Booker, destroying a house. It was accompanied by an F0, which caused little damage. An F1 tornado was also reported near Spearman, and one house was damaged. Three tornadoes struck Perryton, one of which inflicted F3 damage on a farmhouse. 13 people were injured. The second Perryton tornado caused F2 damage to six houses, but caused no injuries. The third tornado caused F1 damage to multiple homes, and no injuries were reported. The event in total caused $2.5 million (1962 USD) in damages.
- May 28, 1962 – A large F2 tornado caused extensive damage near Fredericksburg. An F1 tornado was also reported outside of Comfort, although it is speculated that the Fredericksburg tornado and this one were the same tornado. A brief F0 tornado was also documented outside of Kerrville, destroying a poorly built barn and uprooting crops.
- May 31, 1962 – A relatively strong F1 tornado caused damage in Cottle County, and an F0 tornado tracked through Best, causing minimal damage. A large nocturnal tornado was also documented in Callahan County, destroying four homes at F3 intensity and critically injuring a man. Six other people were also injured. A brief but strong F2 tornado tracked through rural land near Longworth, destroying a house and causing crop damage.
- April 3, 1964 – A powerful F5 tornado struck the city of Wichita Falls, killing 7 people and injuring 111 others and causing an estimated $15 million in damages. It was the first tornado that was broadcast to the public, it was also the highest rated tornado to hit Wichita Falls. The tornado often gets overshadowed by an F4 tornado that struck the same city in 1979.
- April 17, 1964 – A squall line moving through Harris County spawned an F2 (although rated as an F1 by Grazulis) tornado that killed one near Aldine when a mobile home was blown over. The squall line also generated high winds that caused widespread damage in the northern and eastern areas of the county; the Shell Oil refinery in Deer Park recorded winds of 92 mph. The narrow, 81-foot wide tornado was on the ground for 22 miles, lifting near Deer Park.
- May 5, 1965 – An F0 tornado touched down near Spofford, and another F1 tornado briefly touched down near Wingate. No damage was reported.
- May 7, 1965 – A weak and brief F0 tornado caused damage to crops south of Wheeler.
- June 10, 1966 – A long-tracked F2 tornado was observed in Swisher County, causing an unknown amount of damage, Two tornadoes, rated as an F1 and an F0, were documented in the minutes following. No damage was reported.
- June 12, 1966 – A brief F3 tornado damaged fields and crops in Denton County. No injuries were reported.
- May 1, 1967 – Three brief but strong F3 tornadoes hit North Zulch, Ebenezer and Corsicana, causing damage to barns and other structures. A brief F2 tornado was also documented near Mount Pleasant. Later in the day, multiple more tornadoes were reported, including four F2 tornadoes in Polk, Liberty and Guadalupe counties, all of which were brief and caused little damage.
- May 16, 1968 – A brief F1 tornado touched down near Bellevue, causing minimal damage. An F3 tornado also damaged a house near Vernon. No injuries were reported.

FU	F0	F1	F2	F3	F4	F5
					3	3

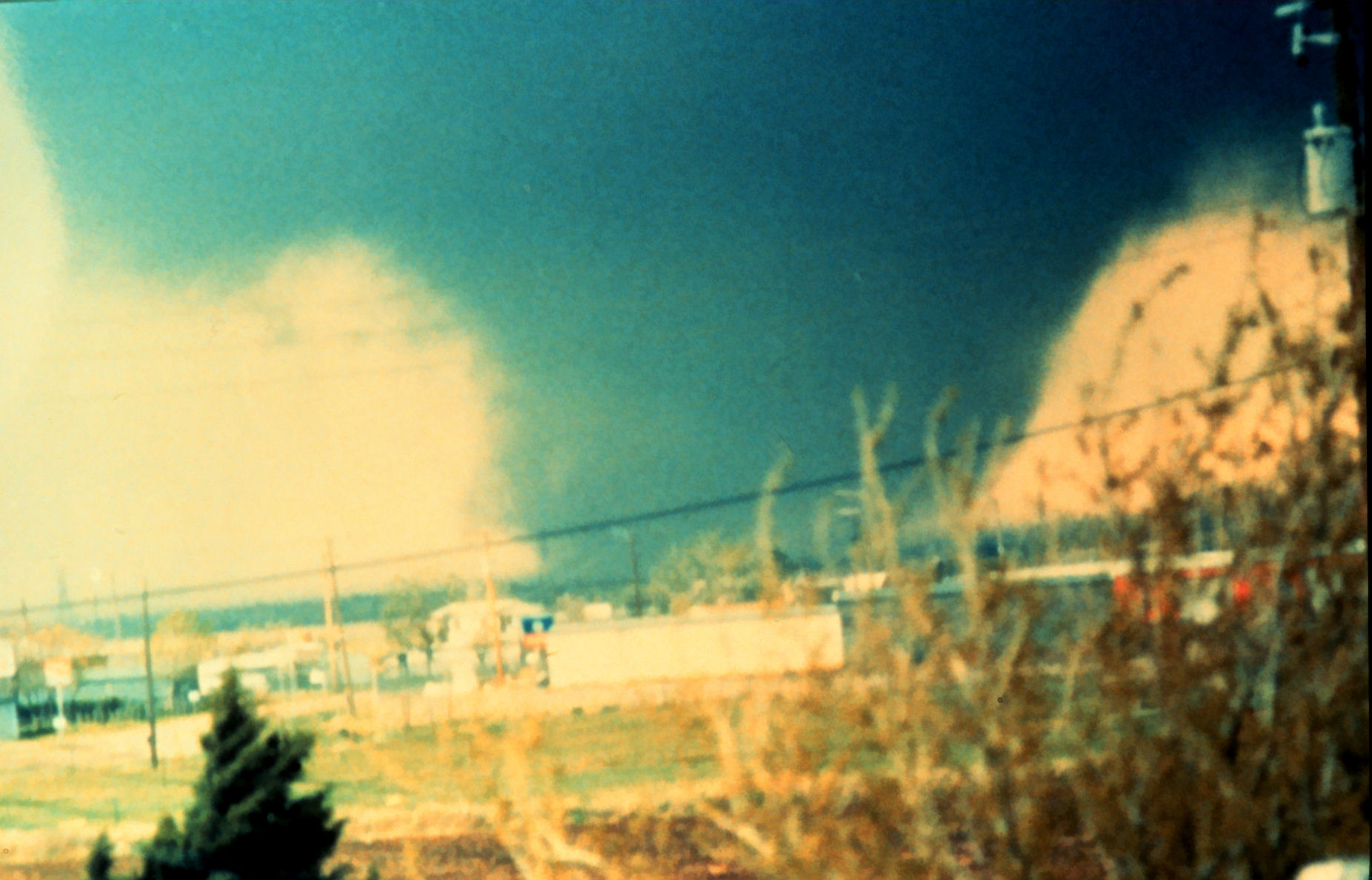
An F4 tornado in Wichita Falls on April 10, 1979

=== 1970–1979 ===
- April 17, 1970 – Three powerful F4 tornadoes caused intense damage in the Southern Texas panhandle. The first tornado touched down near Whiteface, and caused $20,000,000 (1970 USD) in damages while injuring 20 people. Many houses were wiped clean off of their foundations. Multiple grain elevators were obliterated at F4 intensity before the tornado lifted near Anton. The second tornado touched down near Cotton Center, immediately becoming violent and destroying houses, vehicles, and other structures in the immediate path of the tornado. 5 people were killed, and the tornado caused an estimated $4.5 million (1970 USD) in damages before lifting near Hedley. The third tornado formed and touched down in Lazbuddie, destroying multiple houses at F4 intensity and killing one person.
- April 18, 1970 – A violent F4 tornado struck Vigo Park, killing 16 people and causing $100,000 (1970 USD) in damages as it destroyed multiple homes and structures. An F2 tornado impacted areas near Lake Worth, damaging multiple boats before lifting. Another F2 tornado formed directly north of Cross Mountain, damaging multiple homes and downing power lines. An F1 tornado was observed near Plano, throwing an occupied vehicle into the side of a fence. Two people were injured, and no fatalities were reported. Another F2 tornado hit Royse City, damaging a dairy store and damaging a mobile home. A brief F0 tornado was also reported near Franklin.
- April 19, 1970 – A relatively weak F2 tornado hit a nursing home in Longview, causing structural damage and damage to trees.
- May 11, 1970 – A powerful multiple-vortex tornado touched down and tracked into the city of Lubbock, killing 26 people, injuring 1,500+, and causing over $1.96 billion (2024 USD) in damages. It was at the time the costliest tornado ever recorded.
- May 6, 1973 – An F5 tornado caused damage to vehicles, and two pickup trucks were lofted for hundreds of yards. Structural damage was only of F2 intensity, and two barns were destroyed during the event. No fatalities or injuries were reported.
- October 28, 1974 – Part of a larger outbreak, an F3 tornado touched down at the south portal of the Baytown Tunnel at rush hour. A dozen cars were picked up and thrown against each other and against the walls at the tunnel entrance. One man died when his car was picked up and thrown over a 20 foot wall. Seven homes had some sort of damage, a maintenance garage was flattened and a canopy was torn off from a gas station. Grazulis rated the tornado as an F2.
- April 19, 1976 – Homes were swept away, and multiple houses were slabbed. Several teenagers were caught in the open and were picked up and thrown over 1,000 yards, but no fatalities were reported.
- December 13, 1977 – Part of a larger outbreak, an F3 tornado touched down in northeast Houston and was on the ground for 25 miles, running north of and parallel to US 90. One man died when his truck was picked up and thrown 350 feet into a tree as he tried to outrun the tornado. Forty-three structures were destroyed and at least 125 more were damaged.
- April 10, 1979 – An F2 tornado was confirmed in Foard County, causing an unknown amount of damage. A powerful and extremely violent tornado hit Wilbarger County, causing extensive damage to Vernon. Houses were destroyed and multiple businesses were flattened. The tornado killed 11 people in total, 7 of which occurred when the tornado struck a highway. The tornado caused $27,000,000 (1979 USD) in damages, and injured 67 people. Multiple other brief F0 and F1 tornadoes were reported in Wichita and Runnels counties. A tornado hit Seymour, inflicting F2 damage to roofs, power lines, and trees. An extremely violent and catastrophic F4 tornado touched down near Wichita Falls, killing 42 people and injuring 1,740. This is the second-highest number of injuries ever recorded for a single tornado in U.S. history, only surpassed by the 1925 Tri-State tornado. An F3 tornado was recorded near Talpa, causing extensive damage to houses but causing no injuries.
- April 11, 1979 – Multiple brief F1 and F2 tornadoes touched down in Comanche County, injuring one person. A brief F1 tornado was confirmed in Palo Pinto County, and another F1 was reported in Grayson County. An F2 tornado caused damage near Athens, and another F2 tornado hit Sulphur Springs. A brief F1 tornado was also documented damaging crops in Wood County.

FU	F0	F1	F2	F3	F4	F5
	10+	3+	2+	2+	2	1

=== 1980–1989 ===
- April 2, 1982 – A long-tracked and strong F3 tornado tracked through Fannin County, causing extensive damage to multiple houses and barns. One elderly woman was killed while sheltering. An F2 tornado was also recorded in Fannin County, damaging trees and other crops before dissipating near Lake Bonham. A violent F4 tornado tracked through Lamar County, killing 10 people and injuring 170 others. An F1 tornado briefly touched down directly after this tornado had lifted. Three more tornadoes would touch down in Red River County, one of which was an F3 tornado that killed one person and injured four others. The other tornadoes, rated F1 and F2, also briefly damaged crops and rural buildings.
- May 19-20, 1983 – Part of a much larger, multiday outbreak, a localized tornado outbreak struck East and Southeast Texas, killing six. In Harris County, three F2s killed one person each, an F1 killed one near Buckhorn, another F1 killed one near Phillipsburg and an F2 killed one in Nederland.
- December 31, 1984 – An F2 tornado hit Pasadena, injuring 51 people.
- February 5, 1986 – A single storm spawned four tornadoes in the Houston area, including an F3 that killed two and devastated a mobile home park near Tomball and David Wayne Hooks Airport. Over 300 aircraft were damaged or destroyed.
- May 22, 1987 – A deadly F4 tornado struck Saragosa, killing 30 people and causing over $1.4 million (1987 USD) in damages.
- May 13, 1989 – A spectacular F2 tornado struck near Hodges, causing little damage.

FU	F0	F1	F2	F3	F4	F5
				0	1	1

=== 1990–1999 ===
- June 1, 1990 - A rare, violent mile-wide F4 tornado tore across Pecos County, killing two and injuring 21.
- November 21, 1992 - Part of a larger, multi-state outbreak, multiple tornadoes touched down across the Houston area, including a long-tracked, occasionally multiple-vortex F2 that tore through west and northwest Houston, and a second F2 moved across southeast Houston. A long-tracked F3 hit near Lake Houston and a long-tracked, mile-wide F4 damaged or destroyed homes in Channelview. This F4 is the second and final F4 to hit the Greater Houston area (the other hitting Galveston in 1961 during Hurricane Carla). Twenty-one people were injured.
- April 25, 1994 - Part of a larger outbreak, an F4 tornado hit Lancaster, killing three. An F2 caused damage in DeSoto and injured seven.
- June 2, 1995 - An F3 tornado hit the southern side of Friona before it grew into a large wedge east of town. A large F2 near Dimmitt was covered closely by the Project VORTEX team, becoming "the most comprehensively observed tornado in history to that time."
- May 7, 1995 - Part of a larger, multi-day outbreak, an F2 tornado destroyed some 20 homes south of Amarillo and killed a man standing outside his mobile home; he was thrown some 130 feet. In north Texas, a half-mile wide F3 killed two near Forestburg and damaged or destroyed at least 30 homes, two mobile homes and numerous other structures. The same storm then dropped a second F3 that crossed into Oklahoma.
- June 8, 1995 – Multiple violent tornadoes touched down in the Texas Panhandle, injuring 11 people. The most well known of these was a F4 tornado that hit Pampa.
- May 27, 1997 - Several violent tornadoes touched down in Central Texas, including an F5 tornado that hit Jarrell, killing 27 and injuring another 12. This is the most recent F5 to hit Texas, and is regarded as one of the most powerful tornadoes ever recorded. Elsewhere, an F4 killed one and injured five in the Pedernales Valley and three F3s caused damage in Moody, Belton and Cedar Park, injuring a total of 15.
- May 4, 1999 - An F3 tornado killed one person in Titus County and devastated much of De Kalb before crossing into Arkansas. Kilgore was hit by two F2s three minutes apart.
- May 11, 1999 – A violent multiple-vortex F4 tornado hit Loyal Valley. Although it had a short path, it caused over $1 million (1999 USD) in damages and killed 1 person.

FU	F0	F1	F2	F3	F4	F5
0	8+	5+	7	3	1	0

=== 2000–2009 ===
- March 28, 2000 – A powerful and violent F3 tornado struck downtown Fort Worth, killing 2 people. The tornado damaged skyscrapers and low-rise buildings, causing $450 million (2000 USD) in damage. Nine more tornadoes touched down as part of the event, including another F3 tornado that caused extensive damage in Arlington. Multiple brief F0 and F1 tornadoes damaged structures and crops in Dallas, Henderson, Bexar and Navarro counties.
- April 23, 2000 – Six tornadoes touched down in Cass County, including an F3 which damaged buildings. Four F1 and F2 tornadoes touched down in Harrison County, and a relatively strong F2 tornado damaged crops in Red River County.
- April 10, 2001 – An F1 tornado damaged several structures near Fritich, and an F2 tornado destroyed grain bins near Spearman, injuring 2 people. An F2 tornado was recorded directly south of Wheeler, and a home was heavily damaged. An F1 tornado damaged areas surrounding Wichita Falls, and a machine stop was heavily damaged. A brief and weak F1 tornado was also observed near Era, but little damage occurred.
- April 11, 2001 – A brief F1 tornado damaged trees near Muenster, and another F1 tornado destroyed a barn and other structures near Gainesville.
- March 30, 2002 - An F3 tornado caused damage in La Porte.
- May 3, 2003 – A brief and small F0 tornado touched down near Aspermont, and was on the ground for an estimated 3 minutes. No damage was reported. Two F0 tornadoes were also documented in Haskell County, but little damage was reported. Another F2 tornado was also reported near Haskell, downing power lines while an F0 tornado caused minimal damage in Stonewall County.
- May 7, 2003 – An F1 tornado destroyed an old school building and multiple sheds in Callahan County, and an F0 tornado caused minor damage near Cisco.
- February 10, 2009 – A violent tornado touched down in near Spanish Fort, destroying houses at EF4 intensity and killing 5 people.

EFU	EF0	EF1	EF2	EF3	EF4	EF5
0	0	0	0	1	3	0

=== 2010–2019 ===
- November 7, 2011 – A destructive EF4 tornado tore through Wilbarger County, causing large amounts of damage but no fatalities.
- May 15, 2013 – A violent wedge tornado hit Granbury, wiping multiple homes off of their foundations and completely destroying other structures. 6 people were killed, and 54 were injured.
- December 26, 2015 – A wedge tornado hit 600 homes in the communities of Sunnyvale and Garland, causing 10 deaths and 468 injuries. Multiple well-built homes were destroyed at EF4 intensity.
- April 29, 2017 – Eight tornadoes moved through Henderson, Van Zandt, Rains, and Hopkins County, causing 4 deaths and over 49 injuries. The strongest of the tornadoes attained EF4 and EF3 ratings respectively, causing 2 deaths each and severe damage in the Canton area.
- October 20, 2019 – A destructive night time EF3 tornado struck Dallas and Richardson, killing nobody, while inflicting $1.55 billion in damage, making it the second costliest tornado in Texas.

EFU	EF0	EF1	EF2	EF3	EF4	EF5
0	0	0	0	2	2	0

=== 2020–present ===
- March 21–22, 2022 – Several tornadoes struck Central Texas, including at EF3 intensity in Jacksboro and EF2 in Round Rock.
- November 4, 2022 – 2 violent tornadoes strike Caviness, Texas, and Clarksville, Texas at different times. Both causing EF4 damage in the towns.
- January 24, 2023 – Part of a larger outbreak, a rare, low-end EF3 tornado struck the Houston suburban areas of Pasadena and Deer Park, causing $6.6 million (2023 USD) in damages and injuring 3 people. Strongest cold-season tornado to hit the Houston area since 1992 and the first EF3 tornado in Harris County since 2002. Elsewhere in Texas, a brief EF2 ripped the roof off a home and destroyed a barn near Nome and a second EF2 caused major damage near Orange.
- June 21, 2023 – An intense EF3 tornado hit Matador, destroying multiple structures and killing 4 people. A 500-foot-tall radio tower was completely destroyed.
- March 14, 2024 – An EF0 tornado caused minimal damage to crops and structures near Frisco.
- March 15, 2024 – An EF1 tornado touched down near Rochelle, heavily damaging a metal barn.
- April 26, 2024 – Two EF0 and EF1 tornadoes touched down near China Spring, causing damage to several homes and snapping trees. An EF0 tornado briefly touched down near West, causing tree damage.
- May 16, 2024 – Part of a derecho that struck Houston, three EF1 tornadoes touched down: one in Waller County and the other two near Cypress. None of these tornadoes caused any casualties.
- December 28, 2024 – Several strong tornadoes struck the Houston and Port Arthur areas. An EF2 killed one in Hillcrest when a mobile home was hit. An EF3 was on the ground for nearly 69 miles, causing damage in Port Arthur and injuring two before entering Sabine Lake as a waterspout and crossing into Louisiana.

EFU	EF0	EF1	EF2	EF3	EF4	EF5
0	0	0	0	0	0	0

== Climatological statistics ==
The following is a chart showing Texas tornadoes by month or by time period.

Recorded tornadoes affecting Texas by month
Month	Number of tornadoes
May	2

Recorded tornadoes affecting Texas by time period
Period	Number of tornadoes
1900–49	1
1950s	1

=== Tornadoes by county ===
The following chart lists the number of tornadoes by county, based on the location of where the tornado first touched down, and listed by intensity on the Fujita scale, or the Enhanced Fujita scale after 2007.

Fire whirls are indicated with a †.

Number of tornadoes organized by Fujita or Enhanced Fujita scale rating
County	EF/FU	EF/F0	EF/F1	EF/F2	EF/F3	EF/F4	EF/F5	Total
Anderson								
Brazos								
Foard								
Goliad							1	1
Haskell	10+	2+	1+	1+	1+	1		
McLennan							1	1
Red River						2+		
Stonewall								
Wiliamson							1	1
Wood								
Total								

== See also ==
- List of Texas hurricanes
- Lists of tornadoes and tornado outbreaks
