= Tornadoes of 1970 =

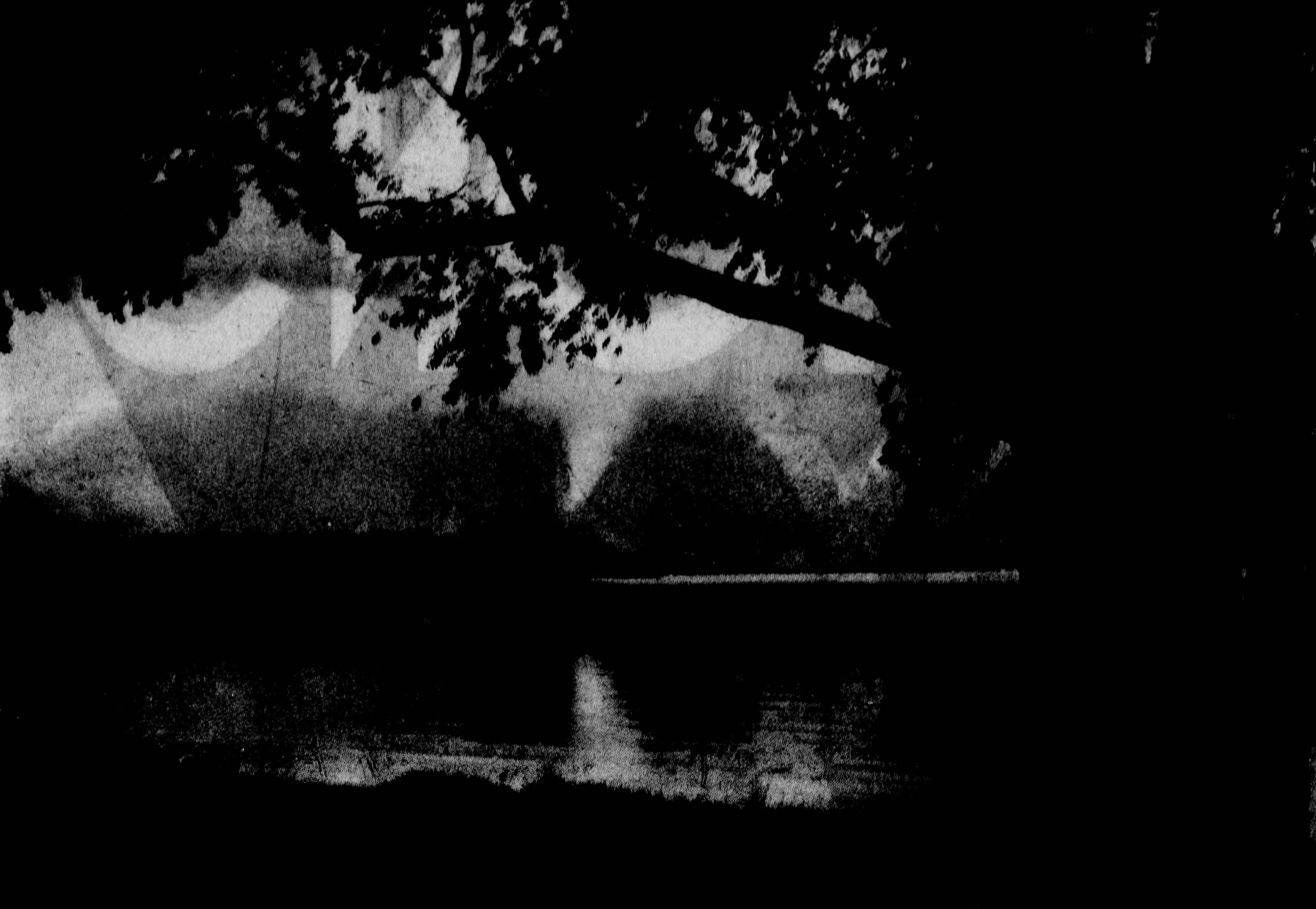
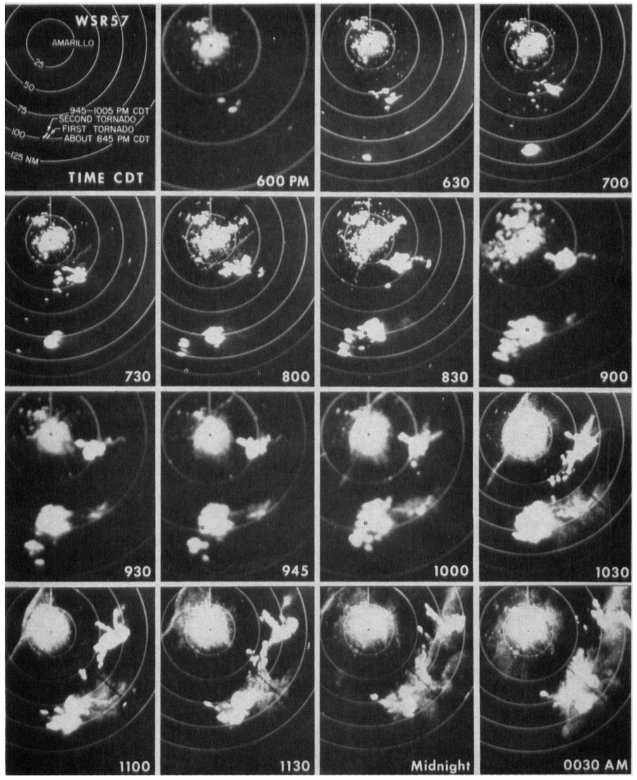
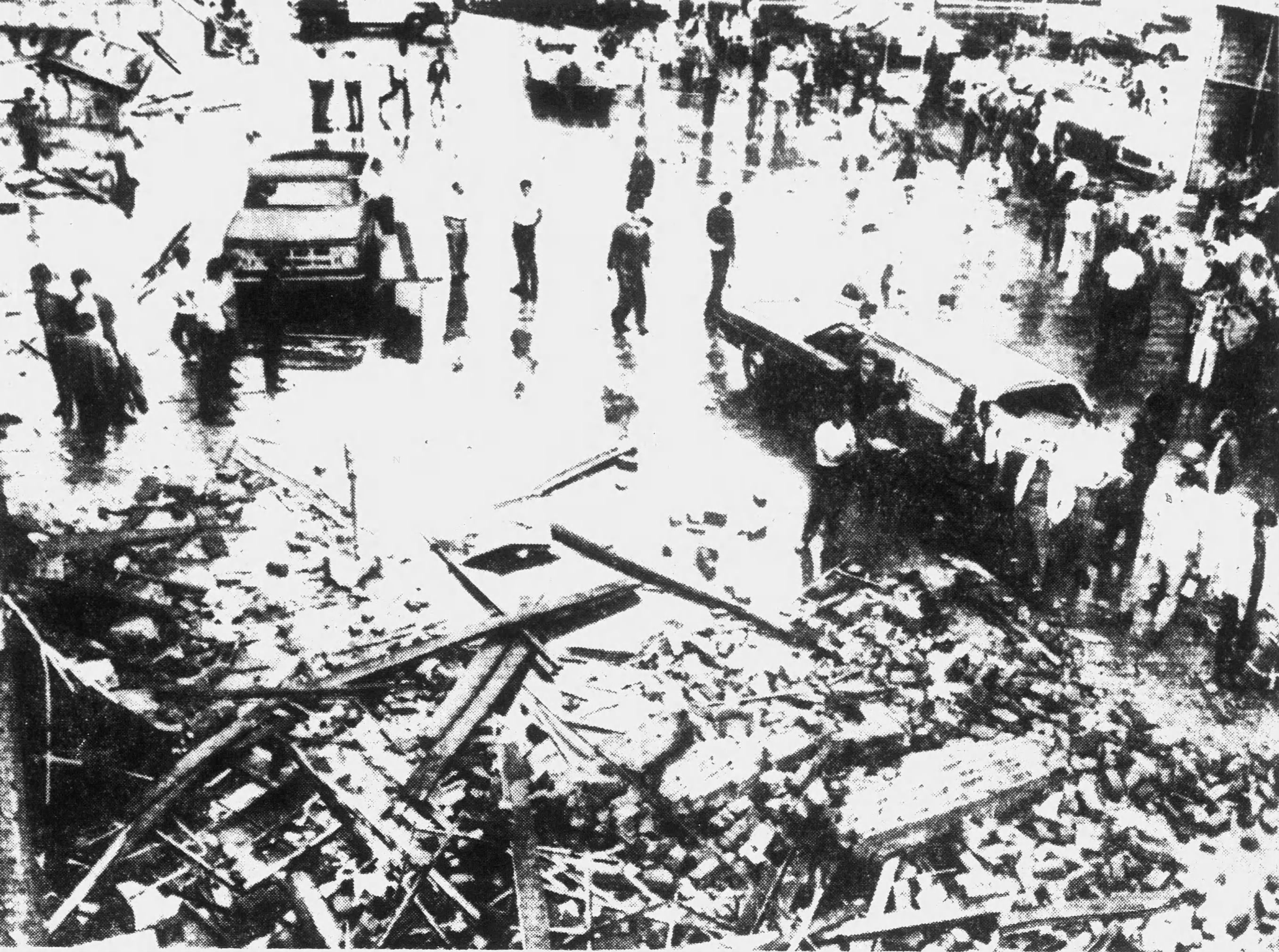
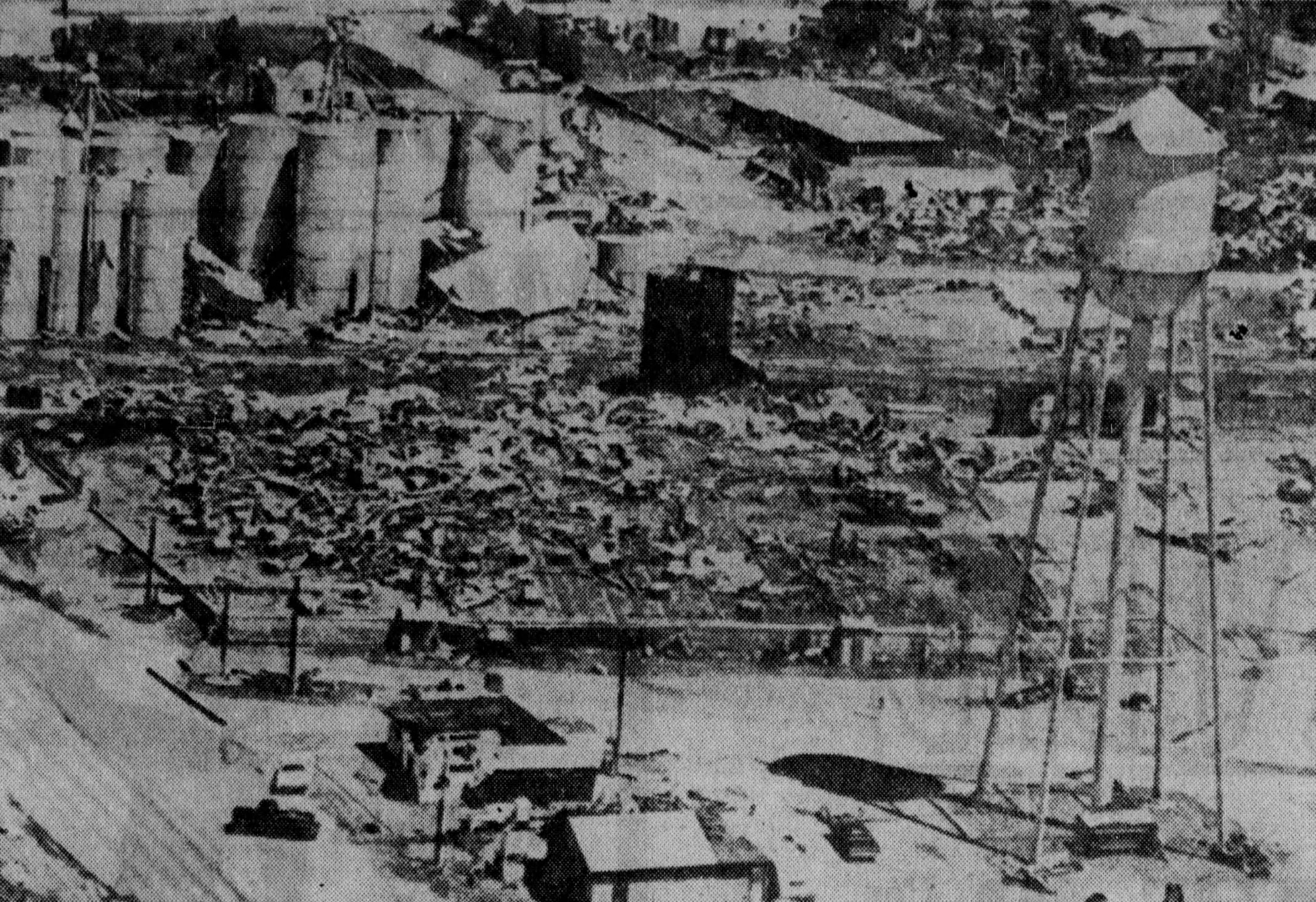
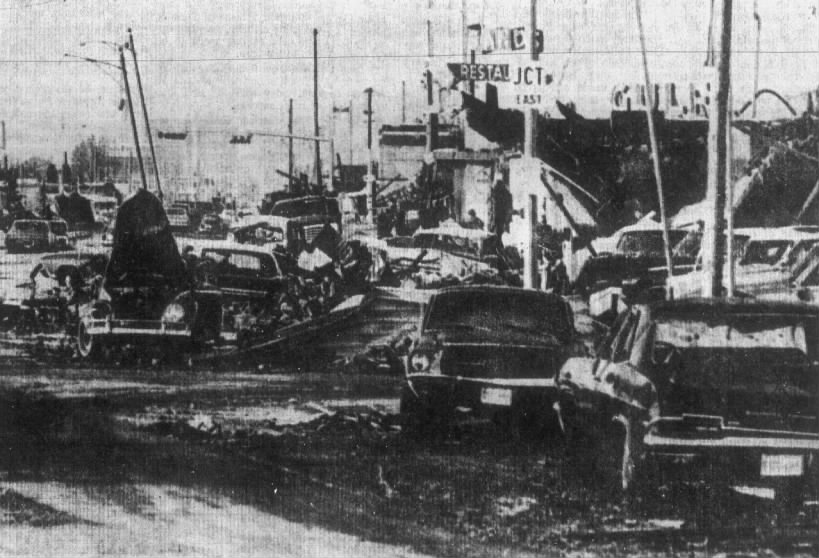
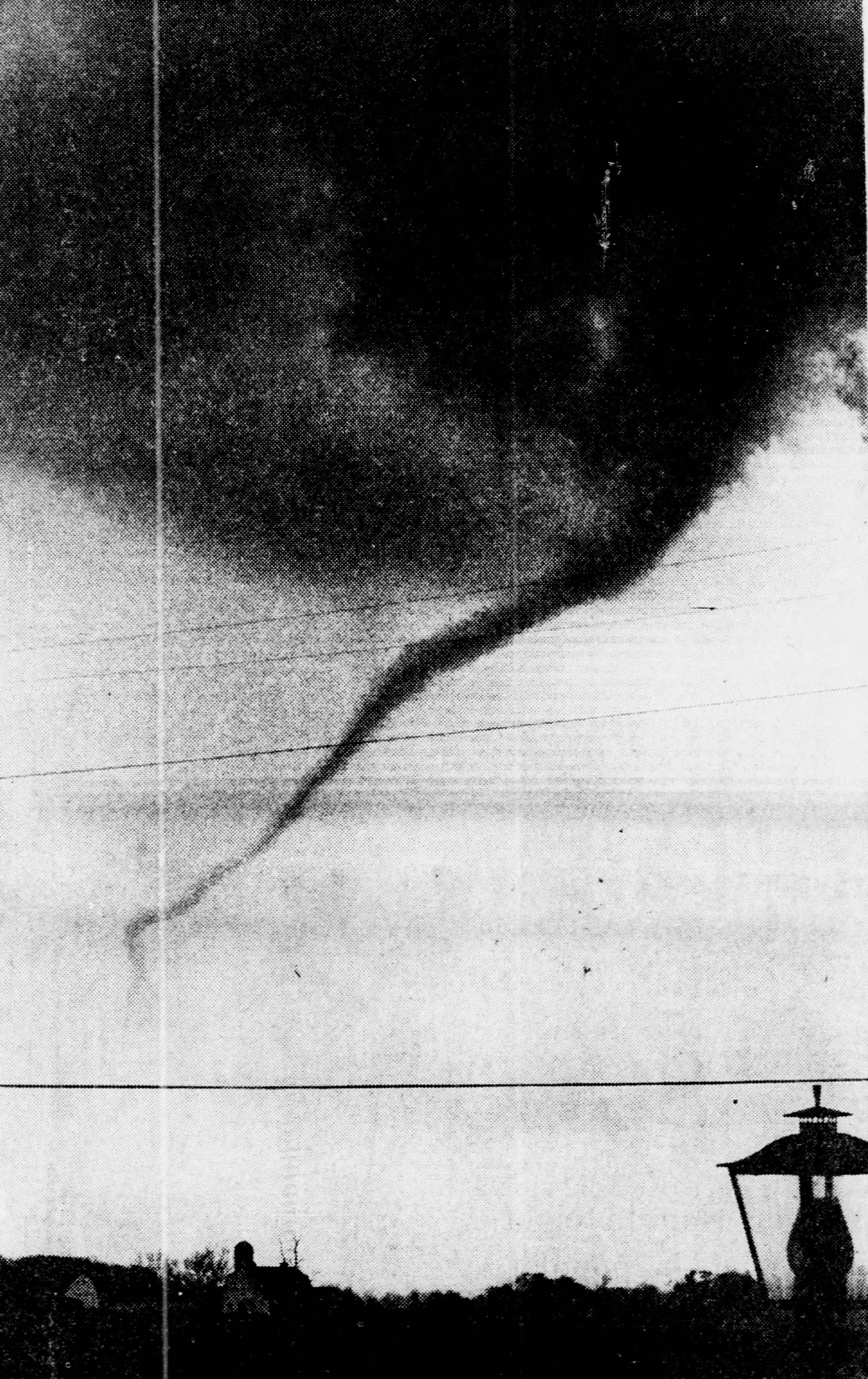
- Clockwise from top: An F2 tornado approaching Miltona, Minnesota on July 18; Damage in Shawnee, Oklahoma after an F4 tornado on October 5; Damage near downtown Lubbock, Texas after an F5 tornado on May 11; An F1 tornado near Delta Charter Township, Michigan on April 30; Damage to downtown Whiteface, Texas after an F4 tornado on April 17; A series of WSR-57 radar scans of tornado producing storms moving over Lubbock, Texas on May 11.
- Timespan: January - December 1970
- Maximum rated tornado: F5 tornado: Lubbock, Texas on May 11
- Tornadoes in U.S.: 653
- Damage (U.S.): Unknown
- Fatalities (U.S.): 73
- Fatalities (worldwide): >79

This page documents the tornadoes and tornado outbreaks of 1970, primarily in the United States. Most tornadoes form in the U.S., although some events may take place internationally. Tornado statistics for older years like this often appear significantly lower than modern years due to fewer reports or confirmed tornadoes.

== Events ==
Fatal United States tornadoes in 1970
- Approximate touchdown location of killer tornadoes in 1970
Summary of tornadoes
- March 19 – Alabama (2 deaths)
- April 17 – Texas (5 deaths)
- April 17 – Texas (1 death)
- April 18 – Texas (16 deaths)
- April 19 – Mississippi, Tennessee (4 deaths)
- April 25 – Texas (1 death)
- April 27 – Tennessee (3 deaths)
- May 11 – Texas (26 deaths)
- June 11 – Oklahoma (1 death)
- June 11 – Oklahoma (1 death)
- June 11 – Oklahoma, Arkansas (1 death)
- June 18 – New York (1 death)
- June 18 – Pennsylvania (1 death)
- June 24 – Texas (1 death)
- July 4 – Texas (1 death)
- July 14 – South Dakota (1 death)
- July 22 – Georgia (1 death)
- October 3 – Massachusetts (1 death)
- October 5 – Oklahoma (4 deaths)
- October 11 – Louisiana (1 death)
Total fatalities: 73

=== United States yearly total ===
Confirmed tornadoes by Fujita rating
FU	F0	F1	F2	F3	F4	F5	Total
0	164	253	191	36	8	1	653

== January ==
9 tornadoes were reported in the United States in January.

=== January 1 (Australia) ===
An intense tornado, which occurred near the town of Bulahdelah (100 kilometres (62.1 mi) north-northeast of Newcastle), New South Wales on 1 January 1970, is thought to be the most destructive tornado ever documented in Australia. It is thought to have reached F4 intensity on the Fujita scale, however, no official rating has been made public. The tornado left a damage path 22 kilometres (14 mi) long and 1–1.6 km (0.62–0.99 mi) wide through the Bulahdelah State Forest. It is estimated that the tornado destroyed over one million trees. A caravan was destroyed and a 2-ton (2,000 kg) tractor was lifted into the air, landing upside down. The tornado was reported by witnesses as a swirling black cloud surrounded by flying debris, and producing a thunderous roaring sound. The weather system that produced the tornado was a classic set-up for violent tornadoes, something somewhat rarely seen outside of the United States, Canada, Bangladesh, and adjacent areas of India.

== February ==
16 tornadoes were reported in the United States in February.

=== February 3 ===
FU	F0	F1	F2	F3	F4	F5
0	1	3	4	0	0	0

A small, localized outbreak occurred in Florida, producing eight tornadoes. One tornado, an F2 tornado, caused at least $50,000 (1970 USD) in damages in Fellsmere. Another tornado, which was also rated an F2, touched down in the Gainesville neighborhood of Ironwood, causing at least $50,000 (1970 USD) in damages. Two tornadoes, an F1 and an F2, tracked through Arcadia, both causing $1,000,000 (1970 USD) combined in damages. Overall, there were no fatalities or injuries, and the total amount of damage was $1,615,000 (1970 USD).

== March ==
25 tornadoes were reported in the United States in March.

=== March 2–3 ===
FU	F0	F1	F2	F3	F4	F5
0	1	3	4	1	0	0

A small two-day outbreak struck in Early-March. The first tornado was a long–tracked F0 tornado that passed Lincoln, Kansas. The other tornado that day, an F2 tornado, carved a 25–mile–long path across Southern Kansas, causing at least $5,000,000 (1970 USD) in damages. Tornado activity continued into the next day when the system took a south-southeastern turn, causing at least seven tornadoes across Texas, Mississippi, and Alabama. The strongest tornado was an F3 tornado that caused $50,000 (1970 USD) in damages near Overton, Texas.

=== March 19 ===
FU	F0	F1	F2	F3	F4	F5
0	0	0	1	1	0	0

Two tornadoes were confirmed in Alabama, of which one was an F3 tornado that killed two people near Lanett, Alabama. The other tornado, which was assigned an F2 rating, touched down in the Greensboro, Alabama area.

== April ==
117 tornadoes were reported in the United States in April.

=== April 1–2 ===
FU	F0	F1	F2	F3	F4	F5
0	0	7	9	2	0	0

A widespread outbreak of 18 tornadoes ranged from Georgia to Ohio, injuring 18 people. An F2 tornado injured four people southwest of Pinhook, Missouri. A suspected F1 tornado touched down in the outskirts of Louisville, Kentucky. Another F2 tornado injured four people near Itta Bena, Mississippi. The strongest tornadoes of the outbreak were two F3 tornadoes that touched down in Georgia on April 2.

=== April 17–19 ===
FU	F0	F1	F2	F3	F4	F5
0	4	12	10	2	5	0

A major tornado outbreak sequence caused 33 tornadoes. The outbreak killed at least 26 people.

=== April 21 (Uruguay) ===
A significant tornado impacted the small town of Fray Marcos. Its rating is not agreed upon, as this source considers it an F4, while this source cosiders it an F2.

=== April 22 ===
FU	F0	F1	F2	F3	F4	F5
0	0	3	4	0	0	0

Seven tornadoes touched down during the nighttime hours; five were in Wisconsin while the other two were in Minnesota. The most significant tornado was an F2 tornado that tracked through Ashwaubenon, a suburb of Green Bay, Wisconsin, injuring two people. The storm also destroyed buildings in Door County and injured a man in the town of Ahnapee in Kewuanee County.

=== April 23–27 ===
FU	F0	F1	F2	F3	F4	F5
0	6	10	11	6	1	0

An intense outbreak of tornadoes occurred across much of the Southern United States. Three F3 tornadoes touched down in the Memphis area, injuring 26 people. The Memphis tornadoes, in all, caused $16,655,000 (1970 USD) in damages. Tornadoes ranged from Texas to Alabama, killing one person and causing at least $5,820,100 (1970 USD) in damages between April 25–26. On April 27, an F4 tornado tracked across Springfield, Tennessee, killing three people. An additional F0 tornado occurred in California.

== May ==
88 tornadoes were reported in the United States in May.

=== May 11 ===
FU	F0	F1	F2	F3	F4	F5
0	2	3	0	0	0	1

A violent F5 tornado touched down in the Lubbock, Texas area, causing $200 million (1970 USD) in damages. A total of 26 people were killed in the tornado. In the days following the tornado, paramedics and aids from many different towns came to help. Blankets and other useful things arrived at relief shelters in Lubbock. Bottled water was on very high demand in the aftermath of the tornado too. Though, Pearl Brewery (at the time was located in San Antonio) sent hundreds of bottled waters for the workers, agents, and the survivors. The town recovered from the storm in less than five years. Five additional, weak tornadoes occurred in Texas, Kansas, and Oregon.

=== May 12–14 ===
FU	F0	F1	F2	F3	F4	F5
0	4	12	9	0	0	0

A moderate tornado outbreak produced 25 tornadoes across Texas and the Midwestern States. One tornado, an F1, caused $30,000 (1970 USD) in damages in Downtown Indianapolis. In the Indianapolis tornado, a shopping center sustained damages up to $20,000 and scattered debris across the city. One woman was also injured after being struck by lightning. Another tornado, rated F2, destroyed buildings, trees, and trailers near Broken Bow, Nebraska, injuring one. Five people were injured near Cardington, Ohio after a brief F2 tornado damaged trees, utility lines, and a mobile home.

== June ==
134 tornadoes were reported in the United States in June.

=== June 10–16 ===
FU	F0	F1	F2	F3	F4	F5
0	28	28	18	7	1	0

A very large, devastating tornado outbreak sequence was observed between June 10 and June 16, 1970. At least 82 tornadoes touched down in the Great Plains region, killing three people and injuring 73 people. The first tornado touched down about one mile south-southeast of Douglas, North Dakota, ripping the roof off of a barn and caused slight damage to a farmhouse. The following day, an F1 tornado struck Duncan, Oklahoma, injuring two people after downing antennas and tree limbs in the area. Another tornado, which was rated F2, struck Hennessey, Oklahoma, destroying two mobile homes, damaging three other buildings, and uprooted trees, injuring two people. An F3 tornado tracked through suburbs of Oklahoma City, destroying a farmstead, damaging a nursing home, a retirement home, two more farmsteads, and ripping the shingles off of a home. One person was injured in the Oklahoma City tornado. Another tornado killed one person near Vinita, Oklahoma, which was rated F2. Another tornado that was rated F2 killed one person near Longtown, Oklahoma. A very long–tracked tornado touched down near Bunch, Oklahoma, tracking 51.8 miles through Springdale, Arkansas, killing one and injuring 45. The strongest tornado of the outbreak sequence was an F4 tornado, which passed near Bynumville, Missouri, leveling farms and causing extensive damage to many more. The last tornado was an F1 tornado that touched down in Marshall, Illinois, causing minor damage to buildings and uprooting trees. Overall, three fatalities and 73 injuries occurred.

== July ==
81 tornadoes were reported in the United States in July.

== August ==
55 tornadoes were reported in the United States in August.

=== August 20 (Canada) ===
An F3 tornado struck Sudbury, Ontario, Canada. The storm killed six people.

== September ==
54 tornadoes were reported in the United States in September.

=== September 9 ===
An F3 tornado went through the south side of Dubuque, the tornado then crossed the Mississippi River, after crossing into Wisconsin the tornado then went into rural fields before dissipating just east of Sandy Hook.

=== September 11 (Italy) ===
On September 11, 1970, a long-tracked F4 tornado struck Venice, in Italy, killing 36 people. In particular one boat sunk, killing alone 21 people.

== October ==
50 tornadoes were reported in the United States in October.

=== October 5 ===
FU	F0	F1	F2	F3	F4	F5
0	0	0	1	0	1	0

Two tornadoes touched down in Shawnee, Oklahoma, killing four people and injuring 85. The total amount of damages amounted to $50,050,000 (1970 USD).

== November ==
10 tornadoes were reported in the United States in November.

=== November 19 ===
FU	F0	F1	F2	F3	F4	F5
0	0	1	4	2	0	0

At least seven tornadoes touched down across the Mississippi and Ohio Valley. The two strongest tornadoes were F3 tornadoes that touched down in Arkansas and Indiana. The most notable was a tornado that touched down near Moro, Arkansas, injuring 27 people and caused more than $500,000 (1970 USD) in damages. The other F3 tornado touched down in Tell City, Indiana, injuring two people and causing $50,000 (1970 USD) in damages.

== December ==
14 tornadoes were reported in the United States in December.

== See also ==
- Tornado
  - Tornadoes by year
  - Tornado records
  - Tornado climatology
  - Tornado myths
- List of tornado outbreaks
  - List of F5 and EF5 tornadoes
  - List of North American tornadoes and tornado outbreaks
  - List of 21st-century Canadian tornadoes and tornado outbreaks
  - List of European tornadoes and tornado outbreaks
  - List of tornadoes and tornado outbreaks in Asia
  - List of Southern Hemisphere tornadoes and tornado outbreaks
  - List of tornadoes striking downtown areas
- Tornado intensity
  - Fujita scale
  - Enhanced Fujita scale
