= Tornado outbreak of April 17–19, 1970 =

Weather event in the United States

Tornado outbreak
- Tornadoes: 33
- Max. rating: F4 tornado
- Duration: April 17–19, 1970

Overall effects
- Fatalities: 26
- Injuries: 222
- Damage: >$27 1/2 million ($227,990,000 in 2025 USD) (Note: All losses are in 1970 United States dollars unless otherwise noted.)
- Areas affected: Midwestern and Southern United States
- Part of the tornadoes and tornado outbreaks of 1970

From April 17–19, 1970, a tornado outbreak occurred across parts of the Midwestern and Southern United States. (Note: An outbreak is generally defined as a group of at least six tornadoes (the number sometimes varies slightly according to local climatology) with no more than a six-hour gap between individual tornadoes. An outbreak sequence, prior to (after) the start of modern records in 1950, is defined as a period of no more than two (one) consecutive days without at least one significant (F2 or stronger) tornado.) At least 33 tornadoes occurred, 17 of which were significant—F2 or greater—in intensity. April 17 produced many strong tornadoes, four of them violent and long-lived, in New Mexico, western Texas, and the Texas Panhandle. More tornadoes hit East Texas and Oklahoma on April 18, and additional tornadoes affected the Mississippi Valley and Midwest regions on April 19. The deadliest tornado of the outbreak, a long-lived F4, killed at least 16 people in Texas, followed by another F4, also in Texas, that killed five; both belonged to tornado families. A third F4 family along the Mississippi–Tennessee state line claimed four lives as well.

== Background ==
On April 17, a number of supercells formed along a dry line northwest of the Carlsbad–Roswell area in New Mexico and tracked generally northeastward, starting around 5:00–6:00 p.m. CST (23:00–00:00 UTC). Entering West Texas, the storms interacted with a warm front and began producing violent, long-lived tornado families. The storms likely began generating large hail and weak tornadoes over rural areas in New Mexico, but encountered few structures or observers then. Ahead of the storms, dew points reached the lower 60s °F as far north as Lubbock, Texas, and slowly moved northward, in tandem with the warm front, after sunset. Along with copious moisture, strong wind shear was present at this time; these factors, as well as a robust shortwave trough, favored strong tornadoes overnight. Supercells largely paralleled the warm front all night long, coinciding with thick fog that obscured the tornadoes.

== Outbreak statistics ==
Outbreak death toll
State	Total	County	County total
Mississippi	4	Alcorn	4
Texas		Briscoe	1
Texas		Donley	16
Texas		Hale	2
Texas		Parmer	1
Texas		Swisher	2
Totals	26		
All deaths were tornado-related

== Confirmed tornadoes ==
Confirmed tornadoes by Fujita rating
FU	F0	F1	F2	F3	F4	F5	Total
0	4	12	10	2	5	0	33

Prior to 1990, there is a likely undercount of tornadoes, particularly E/F0–1, with reports of weaker tornadoes becoming more common as population increased. A sharp increase in the annual average E/F0–1 count by approximately 200 tornadoes was noted upon the implementation of NEXRAD Doppler weather radar in 1990–1991. (Note: Historically, the number of tornadoes globally and in the United States was and is likely underrepresented: research by Grazulis on annual tornado activity suggests that, as of 2001, only 53% of yearly U.S. tornadoes were officially recorded. Documentation of tornadoes outside the United States was historically less exhaustive, owing to the lack of monitors in many nations and, in some cases, to internal political controls on public information. Most countries only recorded tornadoes that produced severe damage or loss of life. Significant low biases in U.S. tornado counts likely occurred through the early 1990s, when advanced NEXRAD was first installed and the National Weather Service began comprehensively verifying tornado occurrences.) 1974 marked the first year where significant tornado (E/F2+) counts became homogenous with contemporary values, attributed to the consistent implementation of Fujita scale assessments. (Note: The Fujita scale was devised under the aegis of scientist T. Theodore Fujita in the early 1970s. Prior to the advent of the scale in 1971, tornadoes in the United States were officially unrated. Tornado ratings were retroactively applied to events prior to the formal adoption of the F-scale by the National Weather Service. While the Fujita scale has been superseded by the Enhanced Fujita scale in the U.S. since February 1, 2007, Canada used the old scale until April 1, 2013; nations elsewhere, like the United Kingdom, apply other classifications such as the TORRO scale.) Numerous discrepancies on the details of tornadoes in this outbreak exist between sources. The total count of tornadoes and ratings differs from various agencies accordingly. The list below documents information from the most contemporary official sources alongside assessments from tornado historian Thomas P. Grazulis.

=== April 17 event ===
Confirmed tornadoes — Friday, April 17, 1970 (Note: All dates are based on the local time zone where the tornado touched down; however, all times are in Coordinated Universal Time and dates are split at midnight CST/CDT for consistency.)
F#	Location	County / Parish	State	Start Coord. (Note: All starting coordinates are based on the NCEI database and may not reflect contemporary analyses)	Time (UTC)	Path length	Width (Note: The listed width values are primarily the average/mean width of the tornadoes, with those having known maximum widths denoted by ♯. From 1952 to 1994, reports largely list mean width whereas contemporary years list maximum width. Values provided by Grazulis are the average width, with estimates being rounded down (i.e. 0.5 mi (0.80 km) is rounded down from 880 yards to 800 yards.)	Damage
F1	WSW of McDonald	Lea	NM	33.10°N 103.48°W	00:30–?	7.1 mi (11.4 km)	33 yd (30 m)	$2,500
F1	This tornado, along with the next, may have been related to the Whiteface–Silverton F4 family. It touched down a few times, damaging chicken coops and downing utility poles.							
F1	N of McDonald	Lea	NM	33.20°N 103.32°W	00:30–?	0.1 mi (0.16 km)	33 yd (30 m)	$2,500
F1	This tornado felled a 2 1/2-mile-long (4.0 km) stretch of high-tension power poles, while also damaging chicken coops and a disused house. It also rolled a few metal butane tanks and tore up 1/2 mi (0.80 km) of barbed-wire fence.							
F2	N of House to S of San Jon	Quay	NM	34.70°N 103.90°W	02:00–?	39.8 mi (64.1 km)	50 yd (46 m)	$250,000
F2	A tornado passed through McAlister, north of Forrest, and near Glenrio, Grady, and Ragland. It damaged signage, outbuildings, a television antenna, windmills, outhouses, fences, and granaries, along with the windows and roofs of a few churches. The tornado also dislodged a garage, splintered utility poles, tore apart irrigation pipes, and drove glass 1/2 in (1.3 cm) deep into a pulpit and pews. Grazulis did not rate it F2 or stronger.							
F4	Whiteface to Whitharral to W of Anton	Cochran, Hockley	TX	33.60°N 102.63°W	02:50–?	30 mi (48 km)	880 yd (800 m)	$2,708,000
F4	Up to 1/2 mi (800 m) wide, this violent tornado—the first member of a long-tracked family—hit Whiteface, doing $20 million in damage, F4 damage to several homes, and 20 injuries. Most of the injured were in trailers, but five were in a school auditorium. Several large warehouses were leveled, their concrete masonry unit (CMU) foundations swept clean. Most of Whiteface was damaged or destroyed. At Whitharral the tornado destroyed a cotton gin and a sprawling grocery store. A school gym in town was destroyed just after spectators and players left. The tornado was said to have resembled a "rain cloud" and a "'ball of fire'," attended by 4-inch-diameter (10 cm) hail and a possible pair of satellite tornadoes.							
F4	NE of Cotton Center to Plainview to southeastern Silverton to SW of Hedley	Hale, Floyd, Swisher, Briscoe, Hall, Donley	TX	34.00°N 101.98°W	04:00–06:40	96.6 mi (155.5 km)	880 yd (800 m)	$7,230,000
F4	5 deaths – See section on this tornado – 51 people were injured.							
F4	Lazbuddie to southeastern Pampa to WNW of Hoover	Parmer, Randall, Armstrong, Carson, Gray	TX	34.38°N 102.62°W	04:30–06:45	130 mi (210 km)	880 yd (800 m)	$2,500,000
F4	1 death – See section on this tornado – 13 people were injured.							

=== April 18 event ===
Confirmed tornadoes — Saturday, April 18, 1970
F#	Location	County / Parish	State	Start Coord.	Time (UTC)	Path length	Width	Damage
F4	W of Vigo Park to Sherwood Shores to W of McLean	Swisher, Briscoe, Armstrong, Donley, Gray	TX	34.65°N 101.53°W	07:00–09:15	65 mi (105 km)	880 yd (800 m)	$2,100,000
F4	16+ deaths – See section on this tornado – 42 people were injured.							
F2	Lake Worth	Tarrant	TX	32.80°N 97.47°W	21:00–?	2 mi (3.2 km)	50 yd (46 m)	$250,000
F2	A tornado struck a marina on Lake Worth, destroying one houseboat and badly damaging two other boats. The houseboat was picked up and moved 50 ft (15 m). Four boats were sunk as well, and the marina was wrecked. Grazulis did not rate the tornado F2 or stronger.							
F2	W of Leon Springs	Bexar	TX	29.67°N 98.67°W	00:30–?	0.5 mi (0.80 km)	67 yd (61 m)	$25,000
F2	This tornado hit near Helotes, north of Cross Mountain, unroofing a few homes, downing power lines, and felling trees. It also tossed a pump house 100 yd (91 m). Grazulis did not rate it F2 or stronger.							
F1	Plano	Collin	TX	33.03°N 96.68°W	03:30–?	1 mi (1.6 km)	20 yd (18 m)	$2,500
F1	A brief tornado threw a vehicle into a fence, slightly injuring its two occupants. A rear seat was tossed over the road into another fence.							
F2	Royse City	Rockwall	TX	32.97°N 96.32°W	04:00–?	0.1 mi (0.16 km)	33 yd (30 m)	$25,000
F2	A tornado wrecked a deserted, spacious trailer, unroofed a dairy, and damaged a home. Grazulis did not rate it F2 or stronger.							
F0	N of Franklin	Robertson	TX	31.05°N 96.48°W	04:20–?	0.8 mi (1.3 km)	27 yd (25 m)	Unknown
F0	Only minor damage was reported.							
F0	ESE of Crossroads	Lea	NM	33.50°N 103.10°W	22:00–?	0.1 mi (0.16 km)	33 yd (30 m)	Unknown
F0	This tornado hit northeast of Tatum, causing little or no damage. It may have occurred on April 17.							
F2	WSW of Ada	Pontotoc	OK	34.73°N 96.73°W	22:10–?	5.2 mi (8.4 km)	50 yd (46 m)	$25,000
F2	A tornado destroyed a barn, damaged a home, and downed power lines.							
F0	SW of Checotah	McIntosh	OK	35.60°N 95.60°W	00:15–?	0.5 mi (0.80 km)	100 yd (91 m)	Unknown
F0	A brief tornado caused little or no damage.							

=== April 19 event ===
Confirmed tornadoes — Sunday, April 19, 1970
F#	Location	County / Parish	State	Start Coord.	Time (UTC)	Path length	Width	Damage
F2	E of Longview	Gregg	TX	32.50°N 94.68°W	06:55–?	1.2 mi (1.9 km)	33 yd (30 m)	$250,000
F2	At a nursing home, a tornado mangled a porch, resulting in roof damage. It also blew down or twisted numerous trees, many of which were large, hurling one into a house. Grazulis did not rate it F2 or stronger.							
F3	SE of Norton to SSW of Taylortown	Caddo, Bossier	LA	32.32°N 93.67°W	10:00–?	6.8 mi (10.9 km)	50 yd (46 m)	$50,000
F3	A tornado produced a discontinuous path, starting near Wallace Lake. Passing near Elm Grove, it sheared off treetops, tipped over a mobile home, felled utility poles, and damaged sheds, barns, a residence, and four tenant homes. Grazulis did not rate it F2 or stronger.							
F2	SSW of Cordova	Shelby	TN	35.12°N 89.80°W	16:45–?	0.3 mi (0.48 km)	50 yd (46 m)	$125,000
F2	A brief tornado hit a clubhouse and golf course, unroofing a large storehouse and dropping steel trusses onto the clubhouse. Grazulis did not rate it F2 or stronger.							
F4	W of Ripley (MS) to Corinth (MS) to Counce (TN)	Tippah (MS), Alcorn (MS), Hardin (TN)	MS, TN	34.72°N 89.00°W	18:06–?	47.6 mi (76.6 km)	100 yd (91 m)	$1,880,000
F4	4 deaths – See section on this tornado – 78 people were injured.							
F1	SW of Annabella	Sevier	UT	38.70°N 112.07°W	21:00–?	1.5 mi (2.4 km)	50 yd (46 m)	$250
F1	A brief tornado damaged two trailers and carried a woman 30 ft (10 yd). The woman sustained minor injuries to her head.							
F2	Harrisburg	Poinsett	AR	35.55°N 90.73°W	22:15–?	1.3 mi (2.1 km)	100 yd (91 m)	$250,000
F2	A church was partly unroofed and shifted on its foundation. Six trailers were severely damaged as well. Carports, porches, and roofs were hit by fallen trees. Grazulis did not rate the tornado F2 or stronger.							
F3	Greasy Corner	St. Francis	AR	35.00°N 90.45°W	22:15–?	1.8 mi (2.9 km)	100 yd (91 m)	$25,000
F3	A small tornado touched down north of Hughes, destroying a small farmhouse and injuring two occupants. Nearby homes and other structures sustained roof damage. Grazulis rated the tornado F2.							
F1	ESE of Thebes	Alexander	IL	37.20°N 89.40°W	22:50–?	0.1 mi (0.16 km)	33 yd (30 m)	$2,500
F1	One unoccupied mobile home was tipped over and another was shifted 1 1/2 ft (0.50 yd) on its foundation. Windows and roofs were damaged in the Olive Branch area.							
F0	Big Oak Tree State Park	Mississippi	MO	36.65°N 89.30°W	23:00–?	0.2 mi (0.32 km)	17 yd (16 m)	$30
F0	A tornado touched down at several points in the park, snapping 2 1/2-to-3 1/2-foot-diameter (0.76 to 1.07 m) trees and damaging the forest canopy.							
F1	Miner	Scott	MO	36.90°N 89.53°W	23:30–?	0.2 mi (0.32 km)	17 yd (16 m)	$25,000
F1	12 trailers sustained damage in a brief touchdown.							
F1	Destin	Okaloosa	FL	30.38°N 86.48°W	00:45–?	0.1 mi (0.16 km)	33 yd (30 m)	$2,500
F1	A tornado moved a small building off its foundation and capsized a boat, doing minor damage besides.							
F2	WNW of Rehoboth	Harris	GA	32.65°N 84.90°W	02:00–?	0.5 mi (0.80 km)	100 yd (91 m)	$25,000
F2	This tornado destroyed a home and damaged another near Cataula, while splintering or downing large trees. An injury occurred.							
F1	W of Bloomfield	Greene	IN	39.03°N 86.95°W	02:30–?	0.8 mi (1.3 km)	50 yd (46 m)	$25,000
F1	This and the next event coincided with each other, extensively damaging many outbuildings and homes.							
F1	S of Plummer	Greene	IN	38.97°N 86.97°W	02:30–?	0.8 mi (1.3 km)	50 yd (46 m)	$25,000
F1	This tornado occurred south of Bloomfield.							
F1	NE of Harrodsburg	Monroe	IN	39.03°N 86.50°W	02:45–?	0.1 mi (0.16 km)	30 yd (27 m)	$250,000
F1	A brief tornado struck Monroe Lake, damaging boats and a dock.							
F2	NE of Elwren to western Bloomington	Monroe	IN	39.13°N 86.65°W	02:45–?	5.6 mi (9.0 km)	30 yd (27 m)	$250,000
F2	A narrow, low-end F2 tornado struck Highland Village, moving a home 75 ft (25 yd) and damaging others. It also tipped over trailers and damaged five airplanes at Monroe County Airport, injuring six people.							
F1	S of Correct to SE of Versailles	Ripley	IN	39.02°N 85.27°W	03:00–?	3.3 mi (5.3 km)	50 yd (46 m)	$2,500
F1	A three-car garage was destroyed, along with three outbuildings.							
F1	WSW of Cortland to NW of Hayden	Jackson, Jennings	IN	38.95°N 86.00°W	03:45–?	12.8 mi (20.6 km)	20 yd (18 m)	$25,000
F1	Passing north of New Elizabethtown and Seymour, this tornado damaged several outbuildings.							

=== Cotton Center–Plainview–Seth Ward–Silverton–Hedley, Texas ===
Cotton Center–Plainview–Seth Ward–Silverton–Hedley, Texas
Meteorological history
- Formed: April 17, 1970, 11:00 p.m. CDT (UTC−05:00)
- Dissipated: April 18, 1970, 1:40 a.m. CDT (UTC−05:00)
- Duration: 2 hours, 40 minutes

F4 tornado
- on the Fujita scale
- Highest winds: 230 mph (370 km/h)

Overall effects
- Fatalities: 5
- Injuries: 51
- Damage: $7,230,000 ($59,940,000 in 2025 USD)

Related to the Whiteface–Whitharral F4, this long-tracked tornado family first damaged rural areas in the Hale Center–Cotton Center area, where two tornadoes were noted at once, 1 to 2 mi (1.6 to 3.2 km) apart, as well as four to five funnel clouds. The tornadoes damaged a 20-mile-long (32 km) swath, crushing a pickup truck and killing a few of its occupants, while destroying eight homes nearby, injuring seven people, and doing $750,000 in losses. The tornadoes also wrecked many outbuildings and barns. One of the tornadoes subsequently passed through Plainview, causing 40 injuries and $4 1/2 million in damage there. Initially seen by storm spotters southwest of town, the tornado touched down at the Plainview Country Club, skipping east as it downed power lines, trees, and some buildings. Turning northeast, the tornado intermittently damaged tall structures in a 400-to-600-yard-wide (370 to 550 m) swath through town.

The tornado produced continuous damage as it hit Seth Ward, leveling "almost everything" in a three-to-six-block-wide swath. East of Claytonville the tornado leveled a few rural homes, one of which it swept away, killing a couple inside and leaving behind some concrete blocks on its foundation. Near Claytonville, the tornado cut a continuous, 20-mile-long (32 km), 300-to-400-yard-wide (270 to 370 m) path. Rural losses reached $445,000, and 70 cattle were killed or injured. In southeastern Silverton, the tornado killed a 14-year-old girl and destroyed eight homes. Damages reached $1 1/2 million, half of which was to a large grain elevator. Two 50-foot-tall (15 m) tanks were carried 1/4 mi (0.40 km), and a 1,500,000-US-bushel (53,000,000 L) tank was moved 50 ft (15 m). The final damage, rated F3, occurred near Hedley as a farmhouse and barns were destroyed, resulting in a loss of $35,000. The last 22 mi (35 km) of the path may have been related to a separate member of the tornado family and included a few unrecorded injuries.

=== Lazbuddie–Conway–Pampa–Hoover, Texas ===
Lazbuddie–Conway–Pampa–Hoover, Texas
Meteorological history
- Formed: April 17, 1970, 11:30 p.m. CDT (UTC−05:00)
- Dissipated: April 18, 1970, 1:45 a.m. CDT (UTC−05:00)
- Duration: 2 hours, 15 minutes

F4 tornado
- on the Fujita scale
- Highest winds: 245 mph (394 km/h)

Overall effects
- Fatalities: 1
- Injuries: 13
- Damage: $2,500,000 ($20,730,000 in 2025 USD)

This violent tornado family first hit Lazbuddie, destroying three farmhouses, killing a woman, injuring at least three people, and causing $500,000 in damage. In the area the tornado also damaged a trio of other homes and destroyed or damaged many barns and businesses. The tornado also badly damaged agricultural equipment, downed fences, and splintered power poles. Heading northeast at 40 mph (64 km/h), the tornado produced a continuous path 26 mi (42 km) long and 1/2 mi (0.80 km) in width before lifting and possibly reforming as a new tornado. It then redeveloped for 20 mi (32 km) between Canyon and Happy, causing a much narrower, 50-to-75-yard-wide (46 to 69 m) swath of damage. The same or another tornado reportedly produced more scattered damage near Conway.

After passing near White Deer, this or a related tornado then cut a broken, 5-to-7-mile-long (8.0 to 11.3 km), 100-yard-wide (91 m) swath across southeastern Pampa at F2 intensity, unroofing or severely damaging 20 homes and wrecking many trailers. The tornado also damaged municipal buildings in Pampa, and caused losses of $1 1/2 million there, along with 10 injuries. Its damage in town, though substantial, was spasmodic, however. The tornado finally ended in a rural area near Hoover; despite its longevity, it only produced F4 damage at the start of its trek.

=== Tulia–Clarendon–Sherwood Shores–McLean, Texas ===
Tulia–Clarendon–Sherwood Shores–McLean, Texas
Meteorological history
- Formed: April 18, 1970, 2:00 a.m. CDT (UTC−05:00)
- Dissipated: April 18, 1970, 4:15 a.m. CDT (UTC−05:00)
- Duration: 2 hours, 15 minutes

F4 tornado
- on the Fujita scale
- Highest winds: 225 mph (362 km/h)

Overall effects
- Fatalities: 16+
- Injuries: 42
- Damage: $2,100,000 ($17,410,000 in 2025 USD)

The final long-tracked family of the night, this tornado was also the deadliest of the outbreak. Forming northeast of Tulia, it first caused $100,000 in damage to ranches and farms, injuring or killing 85 cattle. After impacting remote countryside for some time, the tornado then leveled a home on each side of U.S. Route 287, west-northwest of Clarendon, badly injuring a woman and killing her husband. The tornado also unroofed a third home nearby, and drove a wooden splinter into a 1.5-inch-thick (3.8 cm) metal gate frame. Next, the tornado hit the Sherwood Shores community—Howardwick today—on the Greenbelt Reservoir, destroying all but one of 173 mobile homes there. Encountering 150 people in the community, the tornado claimed at least 13 lives—a dozen of them instantly—and inflicted 35 injuries. Losses at Sherwood Shores alone reached $1.3 million, and a fourteenth death may have occurred.

Leaving the community behind, the tornado swept away a trailer on Texas State Highway 70, killing a few more people, and damaged a number of rural farmhouses. Near Interstate 40, just west of McLean, the tornado blew tank cars off railroad tracks, one of which landed on I-40. The tornado later wrecked a trio of farmhouses and a cottage near McLean, while damaging five other cottages. In Gray County the tornado tore up 60 to 75 mi (97 to 121 km) of fence and caused $400,000 in losses. It also damaged or destroyed automobiles and agricultural equipment countywide. The tornado was up to 1,300 ft (430 yd; 0.25 mi; 0.40 km) wide near McLean. The storm that produced the tornado continued into Wheeler County, where eyewitnesses reported a deluge of tornado-related debris from earlier.

=== Ripley–Corinth, Mississippi/Counce, Tennessee ===
Ripley–Corinth, Mississippi/Counce, Tennessee
Meteorological history
- Formed: April 19, 1970, 1:06 p.m. CDT (UTC−05:00)
- Dissipated: April 19, 1970, 2:15 p.m. CDT (UTC−05:00)
- Duration: 1 hour, 9 minutes

F4 tornado
- on the Fujita scale
- Highest winds: 215 mph (346 km/h)

Overall effects
- Fatalities: 4
- Injuries: 78
- Damage: $1,880,000 ($15,590,000 in 2025 USD)

A probable tornado family produced sporadic damage for 40 mi (64 km), tracking over northern Mississippi and southern Tennessee. It did most of its damage in Mississippi, where all known deaths occurred. In and near Ripley, the tornado hit many homes, mostly damaging their roofs, and shattered windows as well, while destroying many small outbuildings. In addition, it blew a trailer off its foundation, wrecked a barn, destroyed a CMU print shop, downed trees, and slightly uplifted a school auditorium roof. Losses in the Ripley area totaled $50,000, and F2-level damage was noted.

The tornado may have lifted and reformed into a new tornado before touching down in southern Corinth, cutting a 3-mile-long (4.8 km) swath through a densely-inhabited section of town. The main damage was concentrated in three segments 200 to 250 yd (180 to 230 m) wide, with roof and tree damage between each segment. A trio of churches were destroyed, one of which was leveled, and many homes were wrecked, some incurring F4 damage. In addition, utilities were destroyed or otherwise disabled, causing gas leaks. In all, the tornado destroyed 69 homes and damaged 146 at Corinth, where losses reached $1.8 million and all four deaths occurred, a few of which were in a church that was unroofed. Additionally, the tornado destroyed or damaged eight businesses there. Across the Mississippi–Tennessee state line, in Hardin County, Tennessee, the tornado severely damaged a house, a trailer, a few agricultural outbuildings, and a garage. Damage at Counce reached $30,000.

== See also ==
- List of North American tornadoes and tornado outbreaks

== Sources ==
- Agee, Ernest M.; Childs, Samuel (June 1, 2014). "Adjustments in Tornado Counts, F-Scale Intensity, and Path Width for Assessing Significant Tornado Destruction". Journal of Applied Meteorology and Climatology. 53 (6). American Meteorological Society: 1494–1505. doi:10.1175/JAMC-D-13-0235.1.
- Brooks, Harold E. (April 2004). "On the Relationship of Tornado Path Length and Width to Intensity". Weather and Forecasting. 19 (2): 310–19. Bibcode:2004WtFor..19..310B. doi:10.1175/1520-0434(2004)019<0310:OTROTP>2.0.CO;2.
- Cook, A. R.; Schaefer, J. T. (August 2008). "The Relation of El Niño–Southern Oscillation (ENSO) to Winter Tornado Outbreaks". Monthly Weather Review. 136 (8): 3121–3137. Bibcode:2008MWRv..136.3121C. doi:10.1175/2007MWR2171.1.
- Edwards, Roger; LaDue, James G.; Ferree, John T.; Scharfenberg, Kevin; Maier, Chris; Coulbourne, William L. (May 1, 2013). "Tornado Intensity Estimation: Past, Present, and Future". Bulletin of the American Meteorological Society. 94 (5). American Meteorological Society: 641–653. doi:10.1175/BAMS-D-11-00006.1.
- Grazulis, Thomas P. (May 1984). Violent Tornado Climatography, 1880–1982. OSTI (Technical report). NUREG. Washington, D.C.: Nuclear Regulatory Commission. OSTI 7099491. CR-3670.
  - — (November 1990). Significant Tornadoes 1880–1989. Vol. 2. St. Johnsbury, Vermont: The Tornado Project of Environmental Films. ISBN 1-879362-02-3.
  - — (July 1993). Significant Tornadoes 1680–1991: A Chronology and Analysis of Events. St. Johnsbury, Vermont: The Tornado Project of Environmental Films. ISBN 1-879362-03-1.
  - — (2001a). The Tornado: Nature's Ultimate Windstorm. Norman: University of Oklahoma Press. ISBN 978-0-8061-3538-0.
  - — (2001b). F5-F6 Tornadoes. St. Johnsbury, Vermont: The Tornado Project of Environmental Films.
- National Weather Service. Storm Data Publication (Report). National Centers for Environmental Information – via Storm Events Database.
- U.S. Weather Bureau (April 1970). "Storm Data and Unusual Weather Phenomena". Storm Data. 12 (4). Asheville, North Carolina: National Climatic Data Center.
