= Tornado outbreak sequence of June 10–16, 1970 =

Weather event in the United States

Meteorological history
- Formed: June 10, 1970
- Dissipated: June 16, 1970

Tornado outbreak
- Tornadoes: 82 confirmed
- Max. rating: F4 tornado
- Duration: ~6 days

Overall effects
- Fatalities: 3
- Injuries: 73
- Areas affected: Midwestern United States and the Great Plains
- Part of the tornado outbreaks of 1970

The tornado outbreak sequence of June 10–16, 1970 was an outbreak sequence of 82 tornadoes that touched down in the Great Plains and Midwest. At least 26 significant tornadoes (F2+) touched down during the outbreak sequence.

== Confirmed tornadoes ==
Tornadoes by State
| State | Total | F0 | F1 | F2 | F3 | F4 | F5 |
|---|---|---|---|---|---|---|---|
| FL | 1 | 1 | 0 | 0 | 0 | 0 | 0 |
| IL | 5 | 0 | 4 | 1 | 0 | 0 | 0 |
| IN | 1 | 0 | 1 | 0 | 0 | 0 | 0 |
| IA | 1 | 0 | 1 | 0 | 0 | 0 | 0 |
| KS | 11 | 6 | 1 | 2 | 2 | 0 | 0 |
| KY | 1 | 0 | 1 | 0 | 0 | 0 | 0 |
| MN | 1 | 0 | 1 | 0 | 0 | 0 | 0 |
| MO | 12 | 2 | 4 | 3 | 2 | 1 | 0 |
| NE | 7 | 1 | 3 | 3 | 0 | 0 | 0 |
| ND | 4 | 3 | 1 | 0 | 0 | 0 | 0 |
| OH | 2 | 1 | 1 | 0 | 0 | 0 | 0 |
| OK | 14 | 1 | 4 | 7 | 2 | 0 | 0 |
| SD | 20 | 12 | 6 | 1 | 1 | 0 | 0 |
| UT | 2 | 1 | 0 | 1 | 0 | 0 | 0 |
| Total | 82 | 28 | 28 | 18 | 7 | 1 | 0 |

Confirmed tornadoes by Fujita rating
| FU | F0 | F1 | F2 | F3 | F4 | F5 | Total |
|---|---|---|---|---|---|---|---|
| 0 | 28 | 28 | 18 | 7 | 1 | 0 | 82 |

=== June 10 event ===
List of confirmed tornadoes - June 10, 1970
| F# | Location | County | Time (UTC) | Path length | Damage |
North Dakota
| F0 | SSE of Douglas | Ward | 1830 | 0.2 miles (0.32 km) | A roof was ripped off of a barn and a home sustained minor damage. |
| F1 | N of Clyde | Cavalier | 2030 | 0.1 miles (0.16 km) | A tornado leveled a barn and tore the roof off of a garage. |
Utah
| F0 | NNE of Fruit Heights | Davis | 1905 | 0.1 miles (0.16 km) | |
| F2 | SSW of Thompson | Grand | 2030 | 0.1 miles (0.16 km) | |
Kansas
| F0 | N of Anthony | Harper | 2106 | 0.1 miles (0.16 km) | A brief tornado was spotted north of Anthony. |
Nebraska
| F2 | ESE of Bruno | Butler | 2140 | 0.1 miles (0.16 km) | A tornado damaged a house and damaged or destroyed eight outbuildings. Trees were also uprooted in relation to the storm. |
Storm Data: June 1970

=== June 11 event ===
List of confirmed tornadoes - June 11, 1970
| F# | Location | County | Time (UTC) | Path length | Damage |
Oklahoma
| F1 | NE of Cloud Chief | Washita | 1700 | 0.1 miles (0.16 km) | Brief tornado destroyed some outbuildings. |
| F2 | Hennessey | Kingfisher | 1900 | 0.1 miles (0.16 km) | A tornado destroyed two mobile homes, three businesses, and uprooted numerous trees. Two people were injured when the tornado struck a motel. |
| F3 | SE of Yukon to W of Edmond | Canadian, Oklahoma | 1910–1930 | 13.2 miles (21.2 km) | A tornado destroyed a farmhouse and destroyed several outbuildings. Another farmstead was destroyed a short time later, followed by nursing home and retirement center, where one injury occurred. Several homes and another farmstead were damaged before the tornado dissipated. |
| F1 | Duncan | Stephens | 1945 | 10.1 miles (16.3 km) | A tornado damaged several homes and businesses. The tornado also downed limbs and downed a television antenna. |
| F1 | S of Perkins | Lincoln | 2045 | 0.1 miles (0.16 km) | Brief tornado destroyed three barns and damaged some machinery, killing 13 cows and injuring an additional four. |
| F2 | W of Davis | Murray | 2205 | 2 miles (3.2 km) | A tornado entirely destroyed one house, two barns, and downed several power lines. |
| F0 | WNW of Winchester | Creek | 2211 | 2 miles (3.2 km) | A tornado touched down in open country, causing no damage. |
| F2 | E of Okemah | Okfuskee | 2230 | 0.1 miles (0.16 km) | A tornado destroyed several planes and private hangars at an airport. A small warehouse was also blown away by the tornado. |
| F1 | Pontotoc | Johnston | 2300–2305 | 0.1 miles (0.16 km) | A school and several homes sustained damage, and heavily damaged trees. One man was injured when his mobile home was destroyed. |
| F2 | E of Harden City to S of Stonewall | Pontotoc | 2312 | 2.5 miles (4.0 km) | A tornado uprooted trees and destroyed a barn and damaged a roof on a house. |
| F2 | Vinita to NE of Welch | Craig | 0000–0020 | 15.4 miles (24.8 km) | 1 death – A tornado struck Vinita, damaging or destroying 12 businesses and overturned a truck. A man died of a heart attack when trying to take cover in a post office and a child was injured by flying glass. The tornado then struck the Welch area, uprooting numerous trees and damaging several businesses. The tornado destroyed three barns before lifting northeast of Welch. |
| F2 | Eufaula Lake | Pittsburg | 0100 | 5.2 miles (8.4 km) | 1 death – A tornado struck several mobile home communities, destroying at least 21 mobile homes and a service station. One person was killed and an additional 14 were injured. |
| F3 | Bunch, OK to ENE of Larue, AR | Adair (OK), Washington (AR), Benton (AR) | 0115–0245 | 51.8 miles (83.4 km) | 1 death – A tornado touched down in the Bunch area, damaging a mission school, where one injury occurred. Considerable damage also occurred in Stilwell, Oklahoma. The tornado directly hit Springdale, Arkansas, killing William E. Cawthon, 57, at his home just west of town, causing over $1 million (1970 USD) in damages after 138 homes, apartments, and businesses were extensively damaged. A shopping mall was leveled and also a manor. Ground scouring occurred west of the Springdale limits. The communities of Rhea, Lincoln, Wheeler, and Harmon sustained damage to twelve poultry houses. In Rhea, a public building sustained damage and a church was removed from its foundation. Five hen houses were damaged and a boat dock was slightly damaged before the tornado dissipated. One person was killed and 45 people were injured in this tornado. This was possibly the costliest tornado of the outbreak sequence. |
| F2 | NE of Clayton | Pushmataha | 0400 | 0.1 miles (0.16 km) | One mobile home was destroyed and several other homes sustained damage. |
Nebraska
| F0 | NNW of Page | Holt | 1930 | 0.1 miles (0.16 km) | Brief tornado caused no damage. |
| F1 | Alma | Harlan | 2000 | 0.1 miles (0.16 km) | A tornado destroyed equipment on a farm property. |
Kansas
| F0 | SSW of Heizer | Barton | 2255 | 3 miles (4.8 km) | |
| F0 | WSW of McCracken to NNE of Brownell | Ness | 2300 | 14.7 miles (23.7 km) | |
| F0 | NNW of Antonino | Ellis | 2315 | 0.1 miles (0.16 km) | |
| F1 | S of Ellis | Ellis | 0010–0014 | 0.1 miles (0.16 km) | |
North Dakota
| F0 | NNE of Wyndmere | Richland | 2350 | 0.1 miles (0.16 km) | A brief tornado touched down, causing no damage. |
Storm Data: June 1970

=== June 12 event ===
List of confirmed tornadoes - June 12, 1970
| F# | Location | County | Time (UTC) | Path length | Damage |
Ohio
| F0 | ENE of McZena | Ashland | 1715 | 0.1 miles (0.16 km) | |
Missouri
| F0 | S of Carrollton | Carroll | 1735 | 0.1 miles (0.16 km) | A brief tornado kicked up dust and debris. |
| F1 | NW of Bogard | Carroll | 1750 | 2.3 miles (3.7 km) | A tornado caused damage to at least six farms. |
| F0 | W of De Witt | Carroll | 1800 | 0.1 miles (0.16 km) | A brief tornado caused damage to trees on three farms. |
| F4 | Musselfork to SSW of Callao | Chariton, Macon | 1830–1900 | 16.1 miles (25.9 km) | A violent tornado cut a swath of total destruction from Musselfork to Callao. The first noted damage was to three homes, one mobile home, and several barns, of which all were destroyed. Five homes and 10 barns also suffered extensive damage. A bridge was lifted in the air and dropped upstream, one span length from its original location. The tornado continued its path and either damaged or destroyed outbuildings, barns, and farm machinery on three farms, with lesser damage to five others before dissipating. Despite the damage, no fatalities or injuries occurred. |
| F3 | Macon | Macon | 1919–? | 8.5 miles (13.7 km) | An intense tornado touched down in the Macon area, causing intermittent destruction to buildings. One home was destroyed near the starting point of the path, along with six other homes that were badly damaged. On the first house, a rubber welcome mat made an imprint of the word "welcome" on the side of the house. The tornado toppled a communication tower and ripped the roof off of a building nearby. A crane was also toppled where a bridge was being constructed. After exiting Macon, at least two mobile homes were destroyed, several homes lost their roofs, and many barns were destroyed or badly damaged. One person sustained injuries from the tornado. Additionally, associated strong winds during this tornado were responsible for the death of Missouri Highway Patrol Trooper William R "Bob" Brandt. Strong winds during the storm blew his patrol vehicle off the road and directly into a bridge abutment, killing him. He was the tenth officer in the Missouri Highway Patrol killed in the line of duty. |
| F2 | NNW of Leonard | Shelby | 2000–? | 2 miles (3.2 km) | A tornado caused substantial damage to two outbuildings and threw empty metal grain bins in the air for more than 0.25 miles (0.40 km). |
| F2 | Ewing | Lewis | 2020–? | 6.2 miles (10.0 km) | Several barns and outbuildings were destroyed, several homes were damaged, and a restaurant lost its roof. |
| F3 | SE of Mexico to S of Farber | Audrain | 2040–2110 | 16 miles (26 km) | A long-tracked tornado caused considerable damage to multiple farmsteads. The heaviest damage occurred on a stretch of six miles, producing extensive damage or destruction to buildings and destroyed all of the equipment on a farm just south of Rush Hill. The tornado destroyed a barn and an unoccupied house before lifting. Multiple funnels were observed at several points along the path. |
| F2 | SW of Calumet | Pike | 2140 | 2.3 miles (3.7 km) | A tornado caused intermittent damage occurred in a church cemetery. |
| F1 | Bowling Green | Pike | 2253 | 1.5 miles (2.4 km) | A tornado caused damage on five farms and demolished numerous trees in an orchard. |
| F1 | S of Sedalia | Pettis | 2255 | 0.3 miles (0.48 km) | Two cattle barns and two small outbuildings were leveled by a brief tornado. One person was injured when struck by flying glass. |
Nebraska
| F1 | N of Elm Creek | Buffalo | 1745 | 0.1 miles (0.16 km) | A brief touch down was observed. |
Florida
| F0 | Taylor Creek | Okeechobee | 2024 | 0.1 miles (0.16 km) | |
Iowa
| F1 | Danville | Des Moines | 2210 | 1 mile (1.6 km) | |
South Dakota
| F0 | SSW of Ludlow | Harding | 0000 | 0.1 miles (0.16 km) | A brief tornado touched down in open country, causing no damage. |
Kansas
| F0 | NE of Corbin to S of Wellington | Sumner | 0048–0110 | 2.5 miles (4.0 km) | |
Storm Data: June 1970

=== June 13 event ===
List of confirmed tornadoes - June 13, 1970
| F# | Location | County | Time (UTC) | Path length | Damage |
Missouri
| F1 | Eldon | Miller | 0500 | 0.8 miles (1.3 km) | A small tornado destroyed a body shop. Because of flying debris, two barns sustained damage and several homes were damaged. |
Kentucky
| F1 | W of Cloverport | Hancock | 1045 | 0.1 miles (0.16 km) | A tornado caused roof and window damage to a house on a hill. |
Kansas
| F0 | S of Bazine | Ness | 2100 | 1 mile (1.6 km) | |
| F2 | S of Burdett to NW of Rozel | Pawnee | 2215 | 8.4 miles (13.5 km) | A barn, a brick silo, and a tool house were destroyed, along with some livestock. |
| F3 | NW of Kinsley to WSW of Garfield | Edwards | 0100 | 7.3 miles (11.7 km) | A tornado caused extensive damage on seven farms. |
Storm Data: June 1970

=== June 14 event ===
List of confirmed tornadoes - June 14, 1970
| F# | Location | County | Time (UTC) | Path length | Damage |
Ohio
| F1 | S of South Salem | Ross | 1815 | 0.1 miles (0.16 km) | A small tornado destroyed a barn and a tool shed. |
Kansas
| F3 | SSE of Selden to W of Jennings | Sheridan, Decatur | 1830–1905 | 17.2 miles (27.7 km) | An unusually large tornado, with a width of 900 yards (0.51 mi), caused destruction to ten farmsteads. Five people were injured near the city of Dresden. |
North Dakota
| F0 | NW of Belfield | Billings | 2048 | 0.1 miles (0.16 km) | A tornado touched the ground briefly, causing no damage. |
Illinois
| F1 | Mitchell | Madison | 2135 | 1.5 miles (2.4 km) | A tornado launched a camper 300 feet (100 yd) in the air and blew it 100 yards (300 ft) to the north of where it originally stood. The tornado also killed a dog that was chained to a post. Multiple funnels were seen with the tornado. |
South Dakota
| F0 | N of Artas | Campbell | 2135 | 0.1 miles (0.16 km) | Brief tornado caused no damage. |
| F1 | SSE of Mound City (1st tornado) | Campbell | 2245 | 0.1 miles (0.16 km) | |
| F0 | NNE of Selby | Campbell | 2245 | 0.1 miles (0.16 km) | Brief tornado caused no damage. |
| F0 | SSE of Mound City (2nd tornado) | Campbell | 2245 | 0.1 miles (0.16 km) | Brief tornado caused no damage. |
| F2 | SSE of Mound City (3rd tornado) | Campbell | 2305–2330 | 2.5 miles (4.0 km) | The widest tornado of the outbreak sequence, having a width of about 1,760 yards (1.00 mi), damaged three farmsteads. |
| F0 | N of Wewela | Tripp | 0130 | 0.1 miles (0.16 km) | A tornado touched down in open country, causing no damage. |
Indiana
| F1 | Petersburg | Pike | 2325 | 1 mile (1.6 km) | A tornado either downed or twisted trees in northwestern Petersburg. |
Storm Data: June 1970

=== June 15 event ===
List of confirmed tornadoes - June 15, 1970
| F# | Location | County | Time (UTC) | Path length | Damage |
South Dakota
| F1 | WNW of Madison | Lake | 2210 | 0.1 miles (0.16 km) | |
| F3 | NE of Rutland | Lake | 2220 | 4 miles (6.4 km) | |
| F1 | N of Madison | Lake | 2221 | 0.1 miles (0.16 km) | |
| F1 | Bridgewater | McCook | 0115 | 0.5 miles (0.80 km) | |
| F0 | E of Sioux Falls | Minnehaha | 0130 | 0.1 miles (0.16 km) | |
| F1 | Scotland | Bon Homme | 0130 | 0.1 miles (0.16 km) | |
| F1 | N of Wagner | Charles Mix | 0135 | 0.5 miles (0.80 km) | |
| F0 | NE of Madison | Lake | 0140 | 0.1 miles (0.16 km) | |
| F0 | SW of Sioux Falls | Minnehaha | 0149 | 0.1 miles (0.16 km) | |
| F0 | N of Viborg | Turner | 0155 | 0.1 miles (0.16 km) | |
| F0 | Wakonda | Clay | 0209 | 0.1 miles (0.16 km) | |
| F0 | W of Britton | Brown | 0315 | 0.1 miles (0.16 km) | |
Kansas
| F2 | NNW of Ellis | Graham | 2300 | 1.5 miles (2.4 km) | A tornado that traveled to the northeast, touched down briefly. |
Minnesota
| F1 | NNW of Lake Benton | Lincoln | 0215 | 4.3 miles (6.9 km) | A small tornado either damaged or destroyed barns, garages, and other outbuildings on several different farms north-northwest of Lake Benton. |
Nebraska
| F2 | Norfolk to South Sioux City | Madison, Stanton, Wayne, Dixon, Dakota | 0225 | 59.1 miles (95.1 km) | A generally small tornado caused considerable damage to trees and farm buildings in multiple areas along the path. Most of the damage occurred in the city of Norfolk. |
| F2 | Arlington to Blair | Butler, Saunders, Washington | 0225 | 42.9 miles (69.0 km) | A tornado intermittently caused damage along a 12–mile–path through Arlington. The tornado was last noted on the ground in the city of Blair. |
| F1 | W of Table Rock | Pawnee | 0235 | 0.1 miles (0.16 km) | |
Storm Data: June 1970

=== June 16 event ===
List of confirmed tornadoes - June 16, 1970
| F# | Location | County | Time (UTC) | Path length | Damage |
Illinois
| F2 | SW of Lexington | McLean | 2100 | 4 miles (6.4 km) | Greatest damage occurred in a three–block wide area. |
| F1 | NNE of Colfax | McLean | 2140 | 3 miles (4.8 km) | A small tornado caused minor damage to farm buildings and caused major damage to many trees. |
| F1 | N of Gibson City | Ford | 2200 | 2 miles (3.2 km) | Farm outbuildings were either damaged directly by the tornado or indirectly by debris and broken limbs. |
| F1 | Marshall | Clark | 0203 | 2 miles (3.2 km) | Minor building damage occurred and several large trees were uprooted in the city of Marshall. This was the last tornado of the outbreak sequence. |
South Dakota
| F0 | ESE of Ferney | Brown | 2210 | 0.1 miles (0.16 km) | Brief tornado caused no damage. |
Storm Data: June 1970

== See also ==
- List of North American tornadoes and tornado outbreaks
