= 1927 Rocksprings tornado =

1927 tornado in Texas, U.S.

- Damage in Rocksprings, seen the day after the tornado

Meteorological history
- Date: April 12, 1927

F5 equiv. tornado

Overall effects
- Fatalities: 74
- Injuries: 205
- Economic losses: $1,230,000 (1927 USD)

In the evening hours of April 12, 1927, a large and devastating tornado impacted the town of Rocksprings, located in the U.S. state of Texas. The tornado killed 72 residents of the town and injured a further 200; two other people were killed by the tornado as it passed near Leakey. The tornado was on the ground for approximately 65 miles (105 km) and reached a maximum width of over 1 mile (1.6 km) as it impacted Rocksprings.

The tornado was the third-deadliest in Texas history.

== Meteorological synopsis ==
It was noted that the day of the tornado was warm, and that a thunderstorm was located north of Rocksprings. As night fell, southeasterly winds ceased and the cloud to the north appeared "red"; it appeared to be moving in an easterly direction. Soon after, hail of up to 2 inches (5.1 cm) began to fall in Rocksprings; noise of the hail hitting structures was heard 0.5 miles (0.80 km) away.

== Tornado summary ==
The tornado first touched down three miles northwest of Rocksprings in Edwards County, moving to the southeast. The tornado "wiped Rocksprings off the map" without warning as it impacted town, where it grew to over 1 mile (1.6 km) in width. The tornado had an audible roar as it moved through Rocksprings, and lacked a visible condensation funnel. After passing over Rocksprings, it was noted that the tornado "skipped" into Real County, where two people were killed and five more suffered injuries near Leakey. It continued moving to the southeast while retaining a width of approximately 1/5 mile (0.32 km), before lifting after tracking for around 65 miles (105 km).

== Aftermath ==
One-third of Rockspring's population was killed or injured by the tornado, and 235 of the town's 247 buildings were destroyed. 72 people were killed by the tornado; 50 died within hours of the tornado moving through the town. A railroad point in Camp Wood, Texas, located 42 miles (68 km) away, was contacted by an injured telephone operator in Rocksprings; the operator had to use a telephone on the outskirts of Rocksprings due to heavy damage in the town.

Heavy damage to buildings in Rocksprings

Outside help first arrived to the town around five hours, or after 12:00 am CST, following the tornado. Anti-tetanus immunoglobulin was used by medical personnel to help reduce tetanus infections.

Following the event, the tornado's path was the subject of a tornado damage survey and overall study by meteorologist J.H. Jarboe, which found that the tornado was accompanied by baseball-sized hail and did not have a visible funnel cloud. The study also noted that the tornado "surpassed violence" and that a concrete building was "exploded". A cement-constructed church in town suffered large cracks from the tornado's winds, and the walls bulged outward as a result of damage from the tornado. The damage survey also detailed that while the town's post office and courthouse survived the tornado itself, they were damaged and caught fire soon after.

In his 1990 publication of Significant Tornadoes: A chronology of events, tornado historian Thomas P. Grazulis noted that "nothing approaching the level of tornadic activity had been recorded in the area before, nor has any major activity been recorded since". Damage from the tornado in Rocksprings totaled an estimated $1,230,000 (1927 USD), or $17,822,217 (2025 USD). The tornado was the third-deadliest in Texas history, behind the 1953 Waco tornado and the 1902 Goliad tornado.

== See also ==
- List of F5, EF5, and IF5 tornadoes
  - Jarrell tornado, another deadly F5 tornado and the most recent in Texas
- Cox-Klemin XA-1
