= McDonald, New Mexico =

Unincorporated community in Lea County, New Mexico, United States

- Unincorporated community
- Location in New Mexico Location in the United States
- Coordinates: 33°08′26″N 103°19′03″W
- Country: United States
- State: New Mexico
- County: Lea
- Elevation: 3,963 ft (1,208 m)
- Time zone: UTC-7 (Mountain (MST))
  - Summer (DST): UTC-6 (MDT)
- ZIP Codes: 88262
- Area code: 575
- GNIS feature ID: 891743

McDonald is an unincorporated community in Lea County, New Mexico, United States.

== Description ==
The community is located on New Mexico State Road 206, 13.7 miles (22.0 km) north of Lovington. McDonald had its own post office from May 9, 1912, until August 21, 2010; it still has its own ZIP Code, 88262.
