= Las Cruces, New Mexico =

Las Cruces
- City
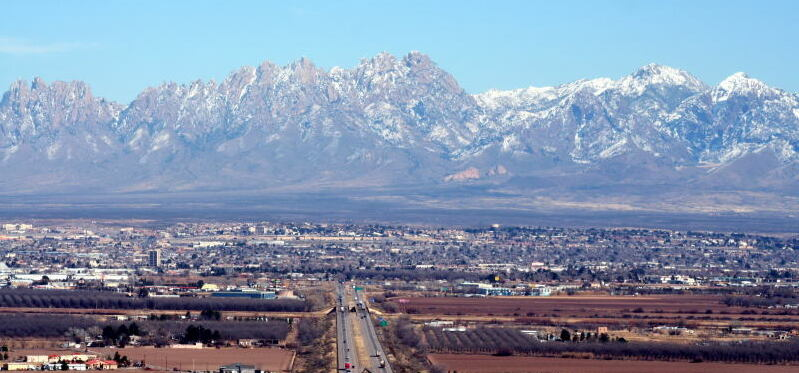
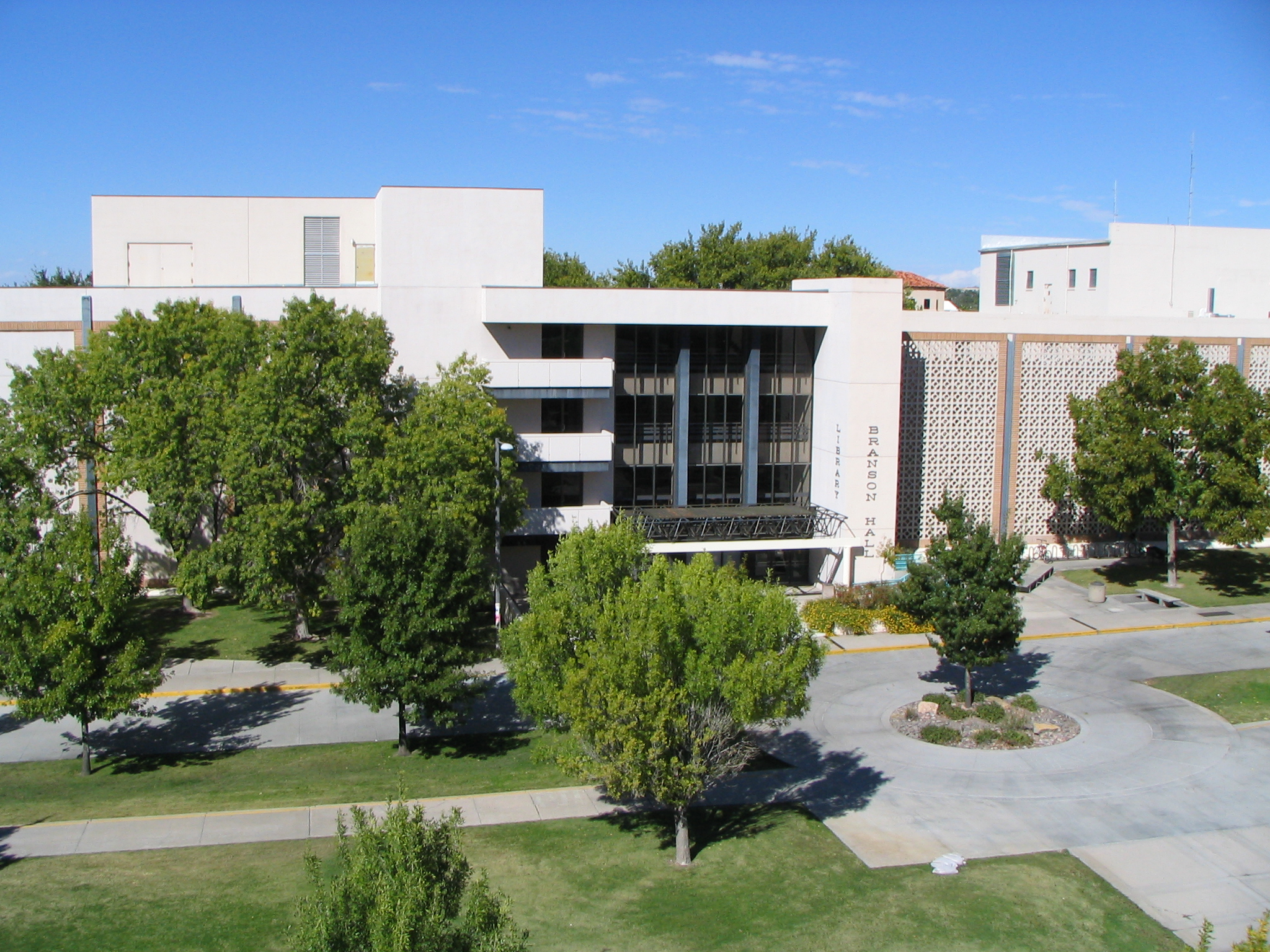
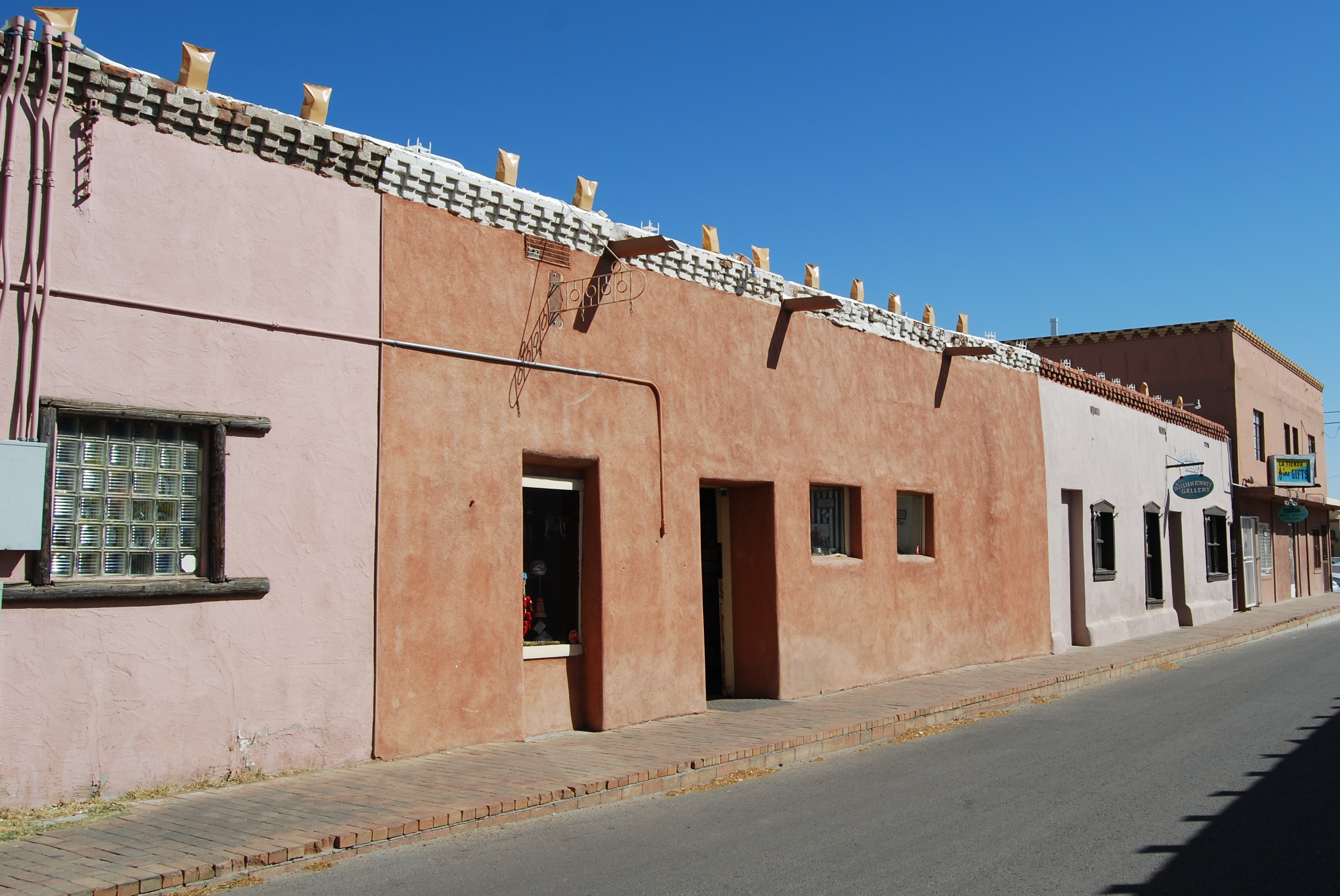
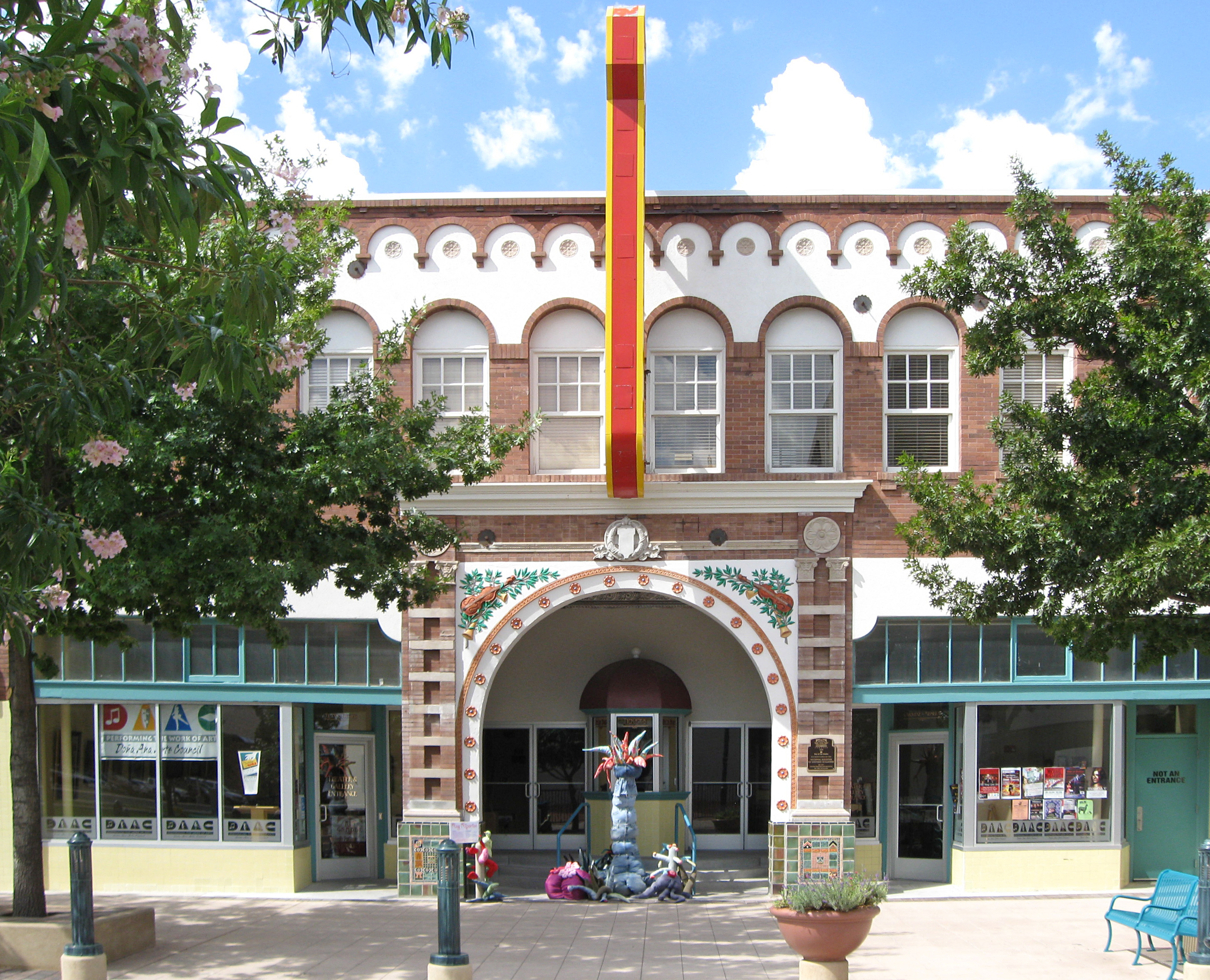
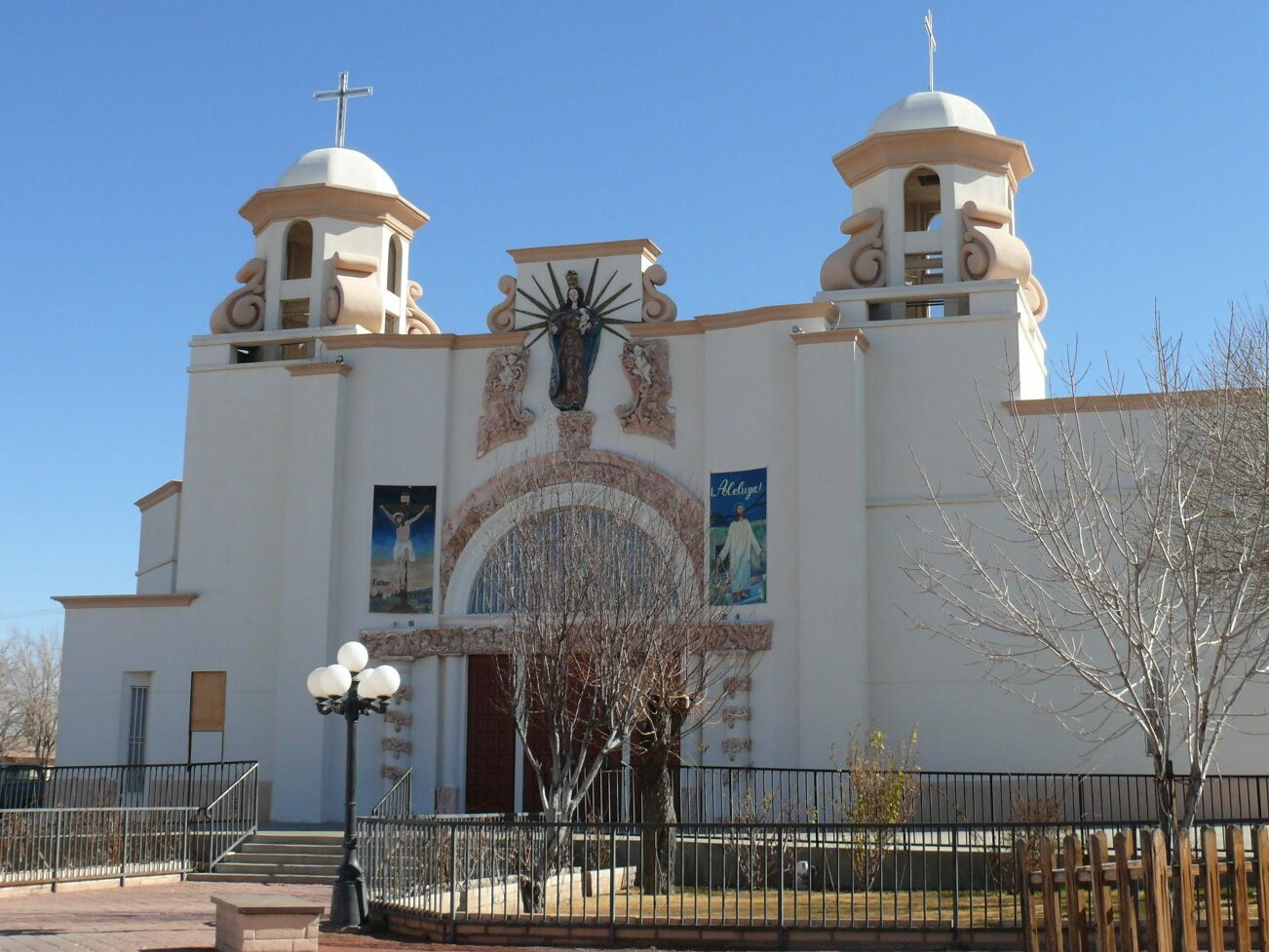
- Las Cruces with the Organ Mountains in the background New Mexico State University Las Cruces Street Rio Grande Theatre Our Lady of Health Church

- Flag Seal
- Nickname: The City of the Crosses
- Motto: Mountains of Opportunity
- Location of Las Cruces within Doña Ana County and New Mexico

- Location within New Mexico Location within the United States
- Coordinates: 32°18′35″N 106°46′43″W
- Country: United States
- State: New Mexico
- County: Doña Ana
- Founded: 1849
- Incorporated: 1907

Government
  - Type: Council–manager
  - Mayor: Eric Enriquez
  - City Council: Cassie McClure, Bill Mattice, Becki Graham, Johana Bencomo, Becky Corran, Yvonne Flores
  - State House: Representatives: 5 Democrats, 0 Republicans; Angelica Rubio (D); Nathan Small (D); Joanne Ferrary (D); Doreen Gallegos (D); Sarah Silva (D)
  - State Senate: State senators: 4 Democrats, 0 Republicans; Joe Cervantes (D); Jeff Steinborn (D); William Soules (D); Carrie Hamblen (D)
  - U.S. House: Gabe Vasquez (D)

Area
  - City: 77.03 sq mi (199.51 km^{2})
  - Land: 76.93 sq mi (199.26 km^{2})
  - Water: 0.097 sq mi (0.25 km^{2})
- Elevation: 3,901 ft (1,189 m)

Population (2020)
  - City: 111,385
  - Density: 1,450/sq mi (559/km^{2})
  - Metro: 217,552 (US: 202nd)
- Demonym(s): Las Crucen, Cruceño, Cruceña
- Time zone: UTC−07:00 (Mountain)
  - Summer (DST): UTC−06:00 (DST)
- ZIP Codes: 88001, 88003-88007, 88011-88013
- Area code: 575
- FIPS code: 35-39380
- GNIS feature ID: 2411629
- Website: lascruces.gov

Las Cruces (/lɑːsˈkruːsɪs/; Spanish: [las 'kruses]; lit. 'the crosses') is a city in Doña Ana County, New Mexico, United States, and its county seat. The population was 111,385 at the 2020 census, making it the second-most populous city in New Mexico, and the largest in both Doña Ana County and southern New Mexico. It is the principal city of the Las Cruces metropolitan statistical area, which encompasses all of Doña Ana County and had an estimated 230,000 residents in 2024. The city is also part of the larger El Paso–Las Cruces combined statistical area.

Las Cruces is the economic and geographic center of the Mesilla Valley, the agricultural region on the floodplain of the Rio Grande, which extends from Radium Springs to the west side of El Paso, Texas. The Organ Mountains, 10 miles (16 km) to the east, are dominant in the city's landscape, along with the Doña Ana Mountains, Robledo Mountains, and Picacho Peak. Las Cruces lies 225 mi (362 km) south of Albuquerque, 42 mi (68 km) northwest of El Paso, and 41 mi (66 km) north of the Mexico–United States border.

The city's major employer is the federal government at nearby White Sands Test Facility and White Sands Missile Range. Spaceport America, which has corporate offices in Las Cruces, operates from 55 mi (89 km) to the north; it has completed several successful crewed, suborbital flights. The city is also the headquarters for Virgin Galactic, the world's first company to offer suborbital spaceflights. Las Cruces is the home of New Mexico State University, New Mexico's only land-grant university.

== History ==
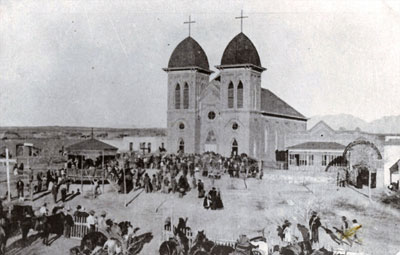
St. Genevieve Church in 1887

During the Mexican–American War, the Battle of El Bracito was fought nearby on Christmas Day, 1846. The settlement of Las Cruces was founded in 1849, when the US Army first surveyed the town, thus opening up the area for American settlement. The town was first surveyed as the result of the American acquisition of the land surrounding Las Cruces, which later became the New Mexico Territory. This land had been ceded to the United States as a result of the Treaty of Guadalupe Hidalgo of 1848, which ended the Mexican-American War. The town was named Las Cruces (Spanish: "the crosses") after three crosses that its earliest settlers had reported seeing just north of the town. The crosses were thought to be "either marked graves or were similar to roadside memorials called descansos".

Initially, Mesilla became the leading settlement of the area, with more than 2,000 residents in 1860, more than twice what Las Cruces had; at that time, Mesilla had a population primarily of Mexican descent. When the Atchison, Topeka, and Santa Fe Railway reached the area, the landowners of Mesilla refused to sell it the rights-of-way, and instead residents of Las Cruces donated the rights-of-way and land for a depot in Las Cruces. The first train reached Las Cruces in 1881. Las Cruces was not affected as strongly by the train as some other villages, as it was not a terminus or a crossroads, but the population did grow to 2,300 in the 1880s. Las Cruces was incorporated as a town in 1907.

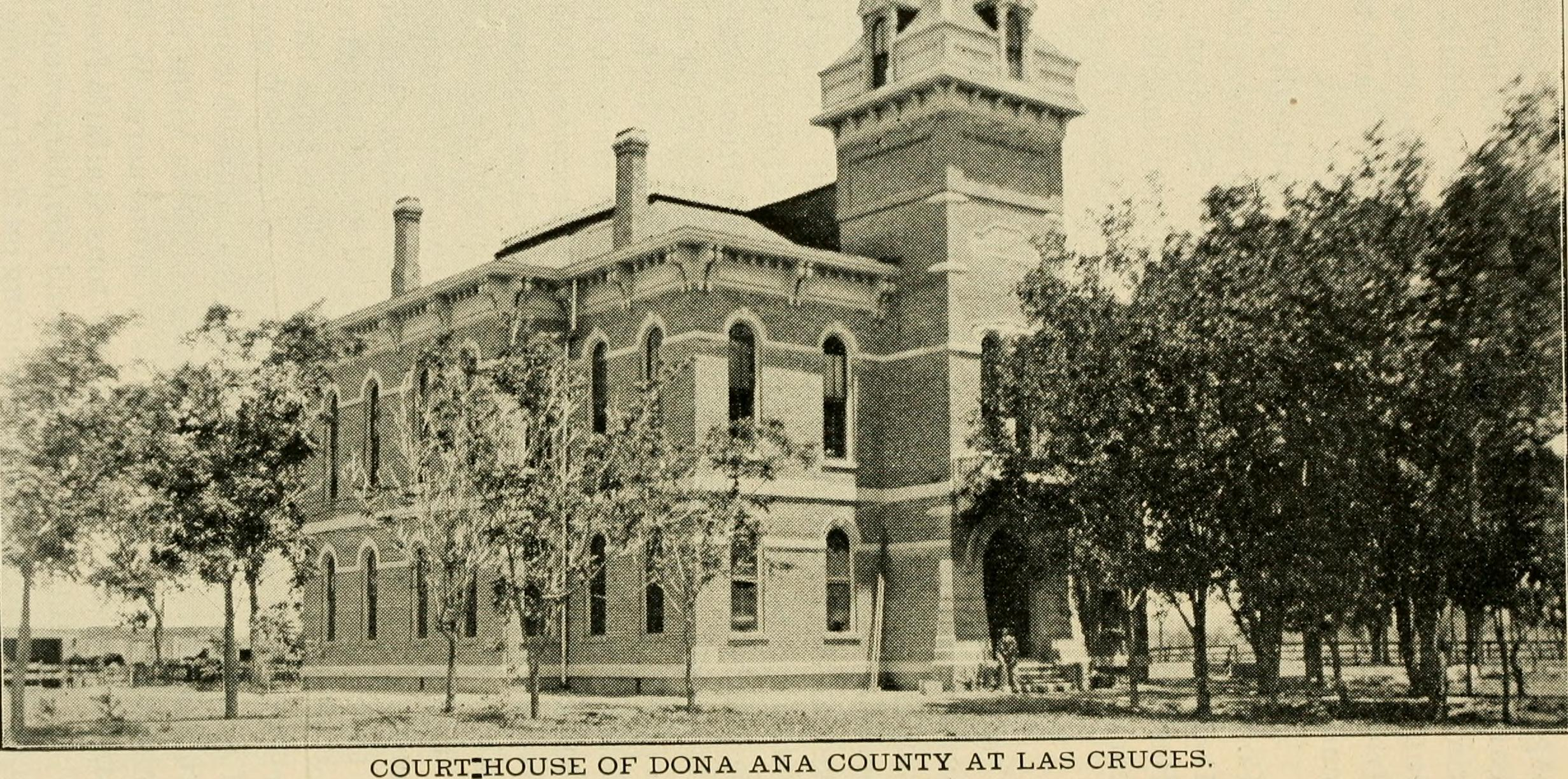
Doña Ana County courthouse, 1904

Pat Garrett is best known for his involvement in the Lincoln County War, but he also worked in Las Cruces on a famous case, the disappearance of Albert Jennings Fountain in 1896.

New Mexico State University was founded in 1888, and it has grown as Las Cruces has grown. The growth of Las Cruces has been attributed to the university, government jobs, and recent retirees.

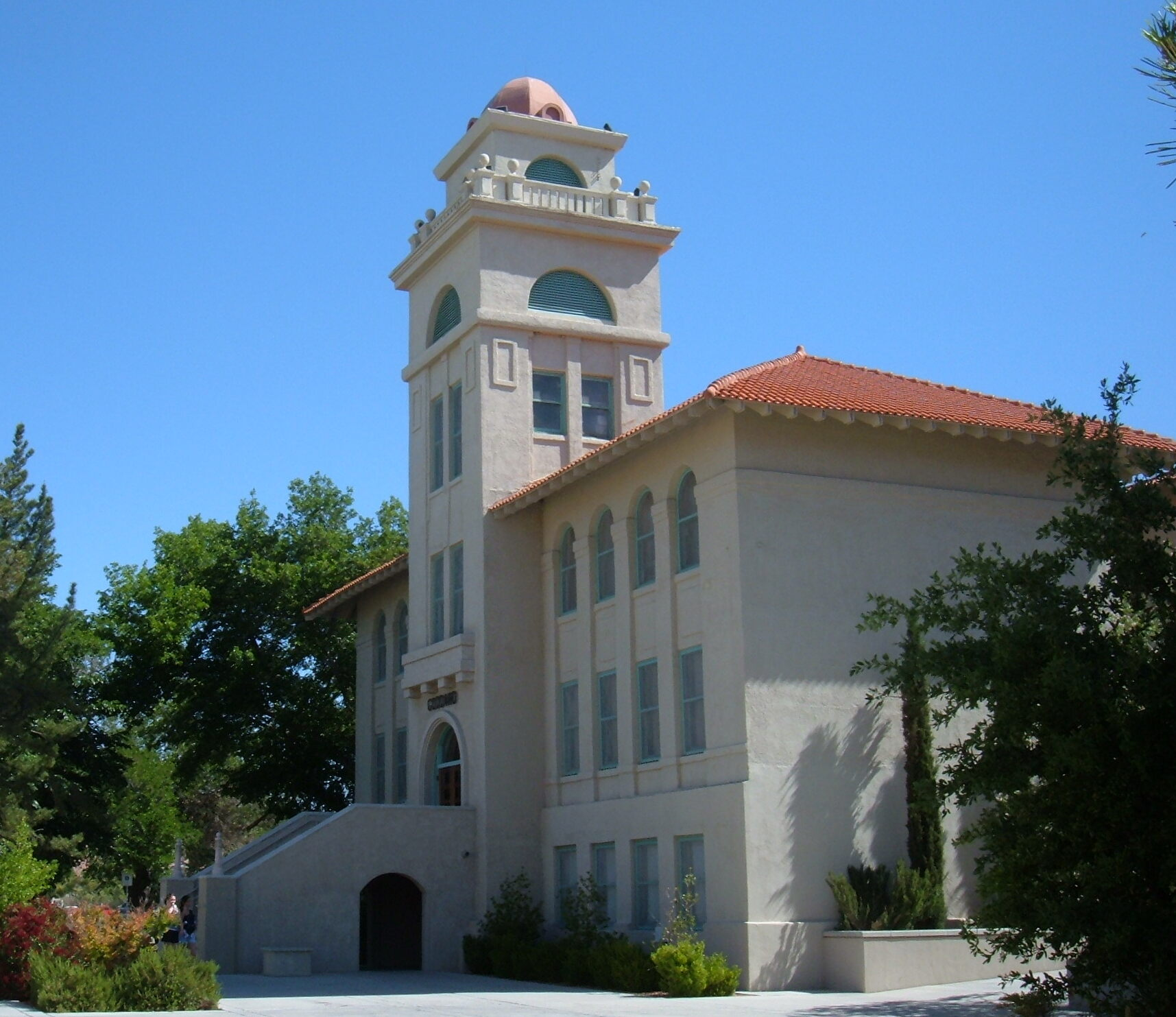
Goddard Hall was built in 1913.

The establishment of White Sands Missile Range in 1944 and White Sands Test Facility in 1963 has been integral to population growth. Las Cruces is the nearest city to each, and they provide Las Cruces' workforce with many high-paying, stable, government jobs. In recent years, the influx of retirees from out of state has also increased Las Cruces' population.

In the 1960s, Las Cruces undertook a large urban renewal project, intended to convert the old downtown into a modern city center. As part of this, St. Genevieve's Catholic Church, built in 1859, was razed to make way for a downtown pedestrian mall. The original covered walkways have been removed in favor of a more traditional main-street thoroughfare.

On February 10, 1990, seven people were shot, four fatally, in the Las Cruces bowling alley massacre. The incident remains unsolved.

== Geography ==
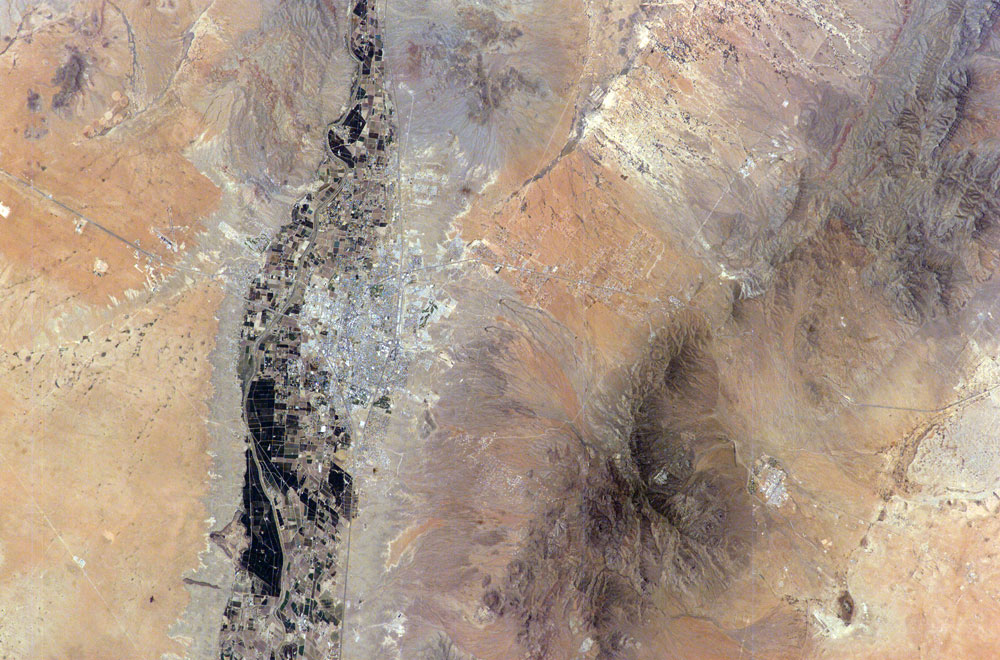
Satellite view of Las Cruces

The approximate elevation of Las Cruces is 3,908 feet (1,191 m) above mean sea level.

According to the United States Census Bureau, the city has a total area of 76.6 square miles (198.5 km^{2}), of which 0.2 square miles (0.4 km^{2}), or 0.18%, is covered by water.

Las Cruces is the center of the Organ Caldera; the Doña Ana Mountains to the north and the Organ Mountains to the east are its margins. Its major eruption was 32 Ma.

Doña Ana County lies within the Chihuahuan Desert ecoregion, and the vegetation surrounding the built portions of the city are typical of this setting; it includes creosote bush (Larrea tridentata), soaptree (Yucca elata), tarbush (Flourensia cernua), broom dalea (Psorothamnus scoparius), and various desert grasses such as tobosa (Hilaria mutica or Pleuraphis mutica) and black grama (Bouteloua eriopoda).

The Rio Grande bisects the Mesilla Valley and passes west of Las Cruces proper, supplying irrigation water for the intensive agriculture surrounding the city. Since the institution of water rights, though, the Rio Grande fills its banks only when water is released from upstream dams, which before 2020 usually occurred at least from March to September. Drought conditions, exacerbated by climate change, mean that the Rio Grande experiences increasingly short or small flows.

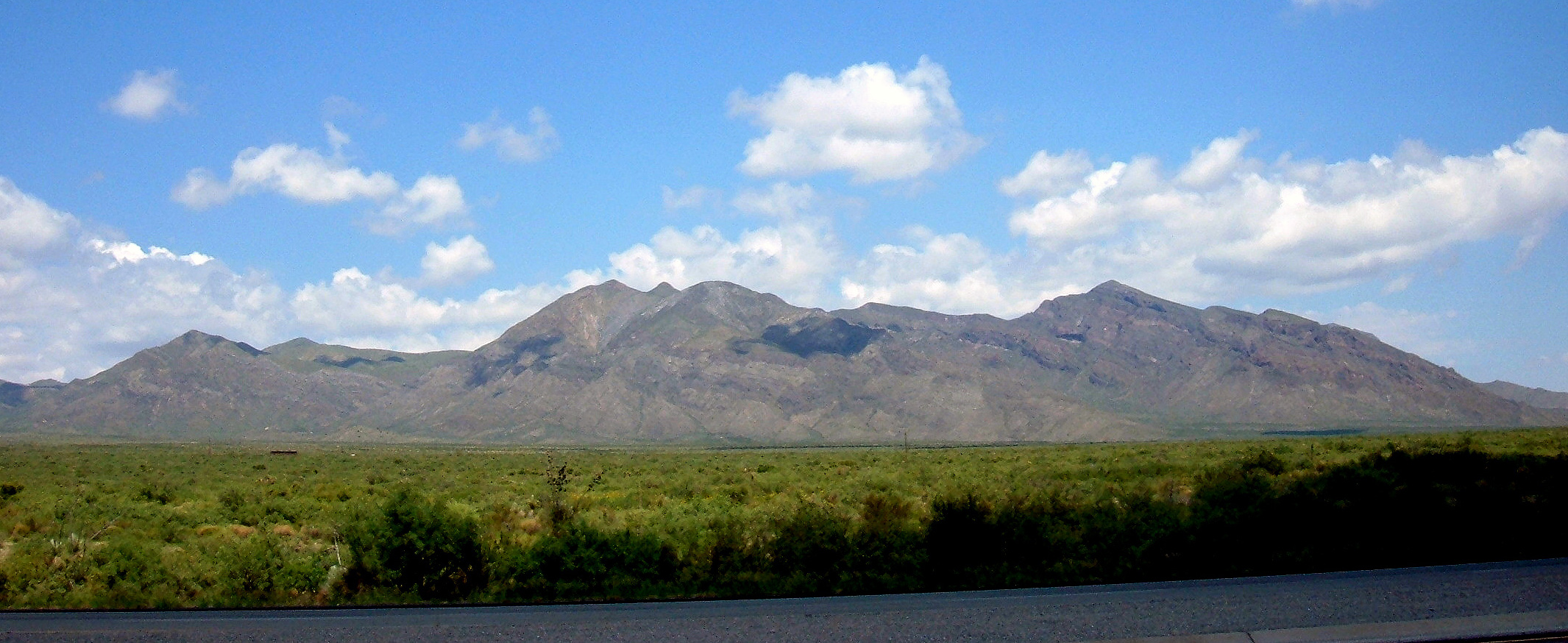
View of the San Andres Mountains

Prior to farming and ranching, desert shrub vegetation extended into the valley from the adjacent deserts, including extensive stands of tornillo (Prosopis pubescens) and catclaw acacia (Acacia greggii). Desert grasslands extend in large part between the edges of Las Cruces and the lower slopes of the nearby Organ and Robledo Mountains, where grasses and assorted shrubs and cacti dominate large areas of this mostly rangeland, as well as the occasional large-lot subdivision housing.

The desert and desert grassland uplands surrounding both sides of the Mesilla Valley are often dissected with arroyos, dry streams that often carry water following heavy thunderstorms. These arroyos often contain scattered small trees, and they serve as wildlife corridors between Las Cruces' urban areas and adjacent deserts or mountains.

=== Cityscape ===
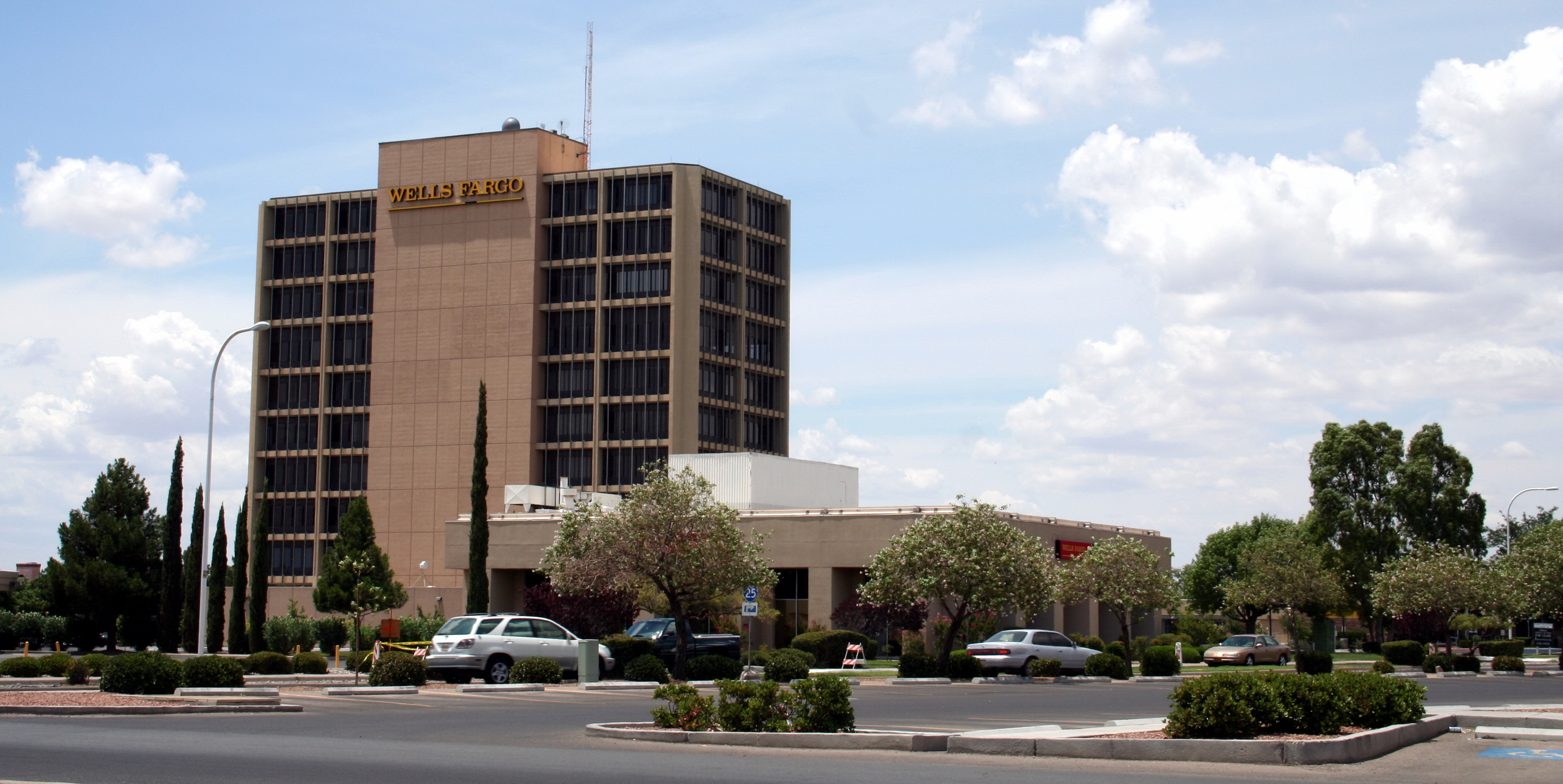
Wells Fargo Tower is the tallest building in downtown Las Cruces.

Unlike many cities its size, Las Cruces lacks a true central business district, because in the 1960s, an urban-renewal project tore down a large part of the original downtown. Many chain stores and national restaurants are located in the rapidly developing east side. Las Cruces' shopping mall and a variety of retail stores and restaurants are located in this area.

The historic downtown of the city is the area around Main Street, a six-block stretch of which was closed off in 1973 to form a pedestrianized shopping area. The downtown mall has an extensive farmers' market each Wednesday and Saturday mornings, where a variety of foods and cultural items can be purchased from numerous small stands that are set up by local farmers, artists, and craftspeople. This area also contains museums, businesses, restaurants, churches, art galleries, and theaters, which add a great deal to the changing character of Las Cruces' historic downtown.

In August 2005, a master plan was adopted, the centerpiece of which was the restoration of narrow lanes of two-way traffic on this model portion of Main Street, which was reopened to vehicular traffic in 2012.

In February 2013, Las Cruces Mayor Ken Miyagishima announced during his "State of the City" address that a 700-acre (280 ha) park in the area behind the Las Cruces Dam was under construction, in cooperation with the Army Corps of Engineers. The area features trails through restored wetlands, and serves as a major refuge for migratory birds and a key recreational area for the city.

=== Climate ===
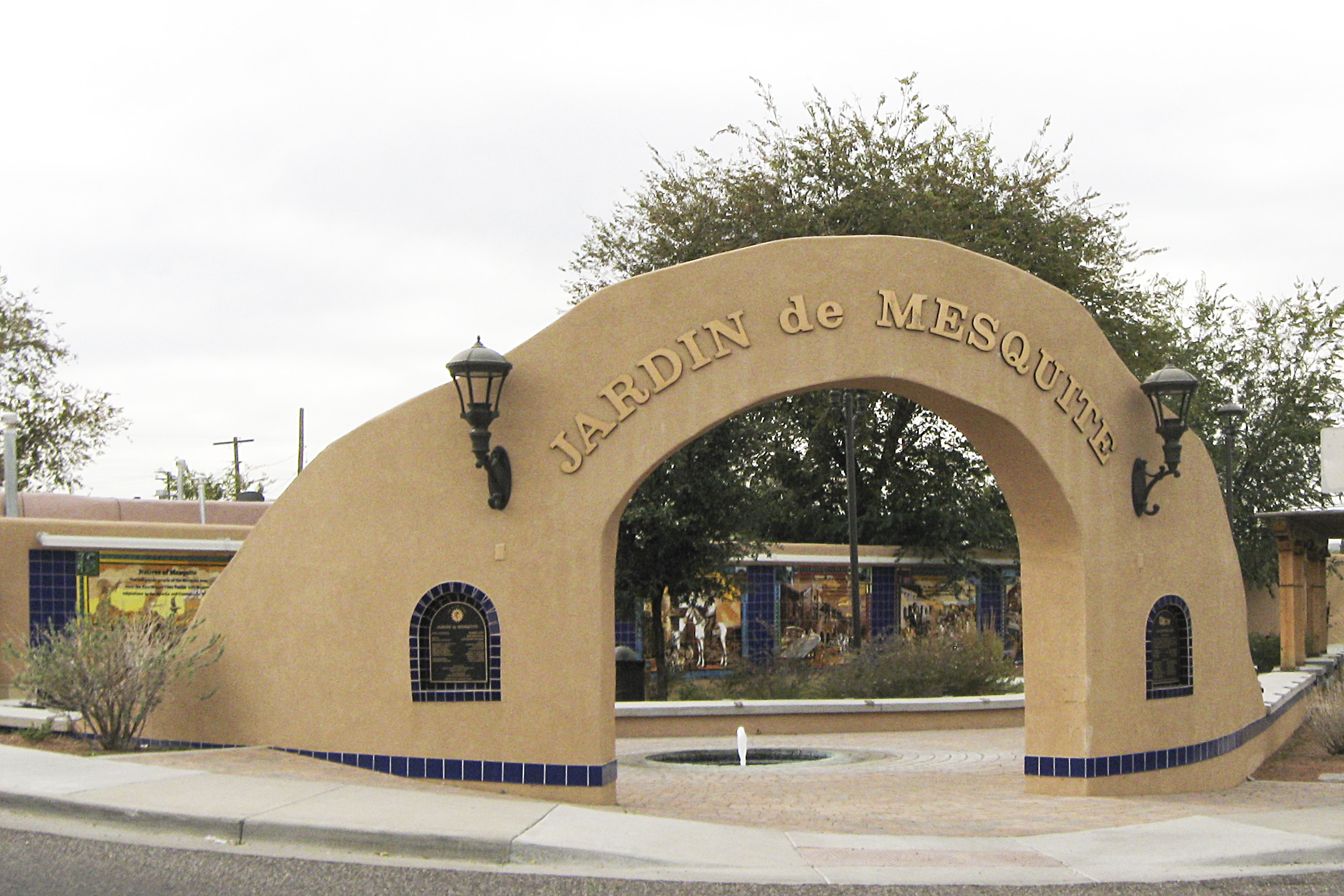
Jardín de Mesquite

Las Cruces has a cool desert climate (Köppen BWk). Winters alternate between colder and windier weather following trough and frontal passages, and warmer, sunnier periods; light freezes occur 69 nights on average. Spring months can be windy, particularly in the afternoons, sometimes causing periods of blowing dust and short-lived dust storms. Summers begin with the hottest weather of the year, with some extended periods of over 100 °F (37.8 °C) temperatures not uncommon, while the latter half of the summer has increased humidity and frequent afternoon thunderstorms, with slightly lower daytime temperatures. Autumns feature decreasing temperatures and precipitation.

Precipitation is very light from October to June, with only occasional winter storm systems bringing any precipitation to the Las Cruces area. Most winter moisture is in the form of rain, though some light snowfalls happen most winters, usually enough to accumulate and stay on the ground for a few hours. Summer precipitation is often from heavy thunderstorms, especially from the late summer monsoon weather pattern.

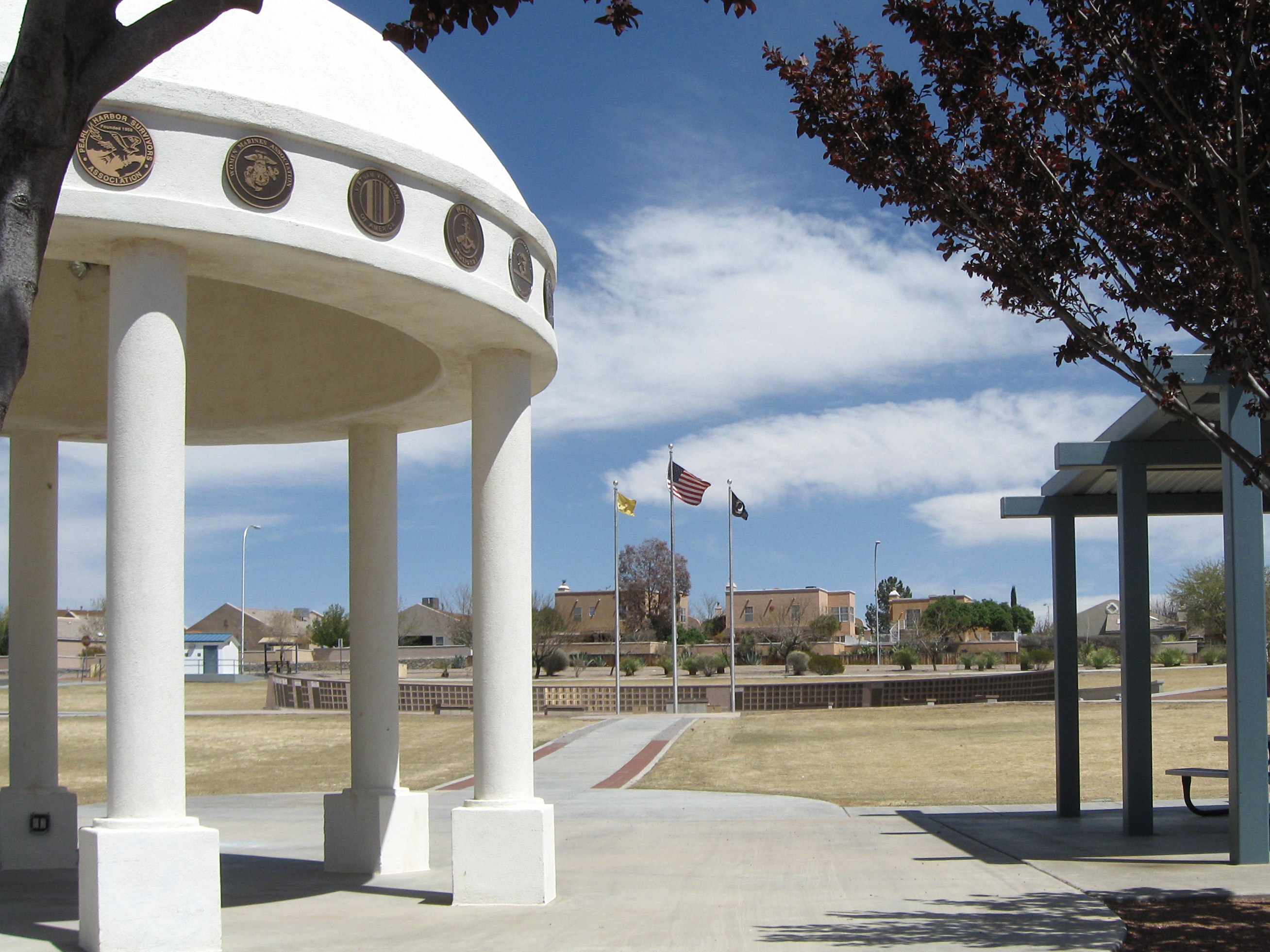
Las Cruces Veterans Memorial Park

Since records began in 1892, the lowest temperature recorded at New Mexico State University has been −10 °F (−23.3 °C) on January 11, 1962 – though only 10 nights have ever fallen to or below 0 °F (−17.8 °C) – and the highest 110 °F (43.3 °C) on June 28, 1994. The lowest maximum on record is 16 °F (−8.9 °C) on January 28, 1948, and the highest minimum 83 °F (28.3 °C) on June 8, 2024. The wettest calendar year has been 1941 with 19.60 inches (497.8 mm), although 1905 with 17.09 in (434.1 mm) is the only other year to exceed 15 in (380 mm). The only months to exceed 6 in (150 mm) have been September 1941 with 7.53 in (191.3 mm) and August 1935 with 7.41 in (188.2 mm). The wettest single day has been August 30, 1935, with 6.49 in (164.8 mm) and the driest calendar year 1970 with 3.44 in (87.4 mm).

Climate data for Las Cruces, New Mexico, 1991–2020 normals, extremes 1892–present
Month	Jan	Feb	Mar	Apr	May	Jun	Jul	Aug	Sep	Oct	Nov	Dec	Year
Record high °F (°C)	78 (26)	86 (30)	90 (32)	96 (36)	104 (40)	110 (43)	109 (43)	109 (43)	103 (39)	95 (35)	87 (31)	78 (26)	110 (43)
Mean maximum °F (°C)	70.2 (21.2)	76.1 (24.5)	83.7 (28.7)	89.1 (31.7)	97.1 (36.2)	103.8 (39.9)	103.5 (39.7)	100.1 (37.8)	96.9 (36.1)	90.7 (32.6)	79.6 (26.4)	71.1 (21.7)	105.0 (40.6)
Mean daily maximum °F (°C)	58.9 (14.9)	64.1 (17.8)	71.3 (21.8)	78.5 (25.8)	87.1 (30.6)	96.2 (35.7)	95.6 (35.3)	93.6 (34.2)	88.4 (31.3)	79.6 (26.4)	67.9 (19.9)	58.1 (14.5)	78.3 (25.7)
Daily mean °F (°C)	44.2 (6.8)	48.8 (9.3)	55.2 (12.9)	62.1 (16.7)	70.6 (21.4)	80.0 (26.7)	82.4 (28.0)	80.6 (27.0)	74.8 (23.8)	64.0 (17.8)	52.2 (11.2)	43.9 (6.6)	63.2 (17.3)
Mean daily minimum °F (°C)	29.6 (−1.3)	33.5 (0.8)	39.2 (4.0)	45.7 (7.6)	54.2 (12.3)	63.7 (17.6)	69.1 (20.6)	67.7 (19.8)	61.1 (16.2)	48.3 (9.1)	36.6 (2.6)	29.7 (−1.3)	48.2 (9.0)
Mean minimum °F (°C)	20.8 (−6.2)	23.3 (−4.8)	29.0 (−1.7)	35.9 (2.2)	43.7 (6.5)	55.5 (13.1)	63.5 (17.5)	62.7 (17.1)	51.8 (11.0)	36.3 (2.4)	25.3 (−3.7)	19.9 (−6.7)	17.7 (−7.9)
Record low °F (°C)	−10 (−23)	−5 (−21)	8 (−13)	20 (−7)	27 (−3)	35 (2)	42 (6)	44 (7)	30 (−1)	20 (−7)	−4 (−20)	−1 (−18)	−10 (−23)
Average precipitation inches (mm)	0.48 (12)	0.36 (9.1)	0.26 (6.6)	0.22 (5.6)	0.38 (9.7)	0.65 (17)	1.77 (45)	1.73 (44)	1.41 (36)	0.82 (21)	0.42 (11)	0.64 (16)	9.14 (233)
Average snowfall inches (cm)	0.4 (1.0)	0.1 (0.25)	0.0 (0.0)	0.0 (0.0)	0.0 (0.0)	0.0 (0.0)	0.0 (0.0)	0.0 (0.0)	0.0 (0.0)	0.0 (0.0)	0.1 (0.25)	0.4 (1.0)	1.0 (2.5)
Average precipitation days (≥ 0.01 in)	3.3	2.5	2.0	1.6	2.1	3.2	8.9	8.4	5.2	4.0	2.6	3.3	47.1
Average snowy days (≥ 0.1 in)	0.3	0.1	0.0	0.0	0.0	0.0	0.0	0.0	0.0	0.0	0.1	0.3	0.8
Source 1: NOAA
Source 2: National Weather Service

== Demographics ==
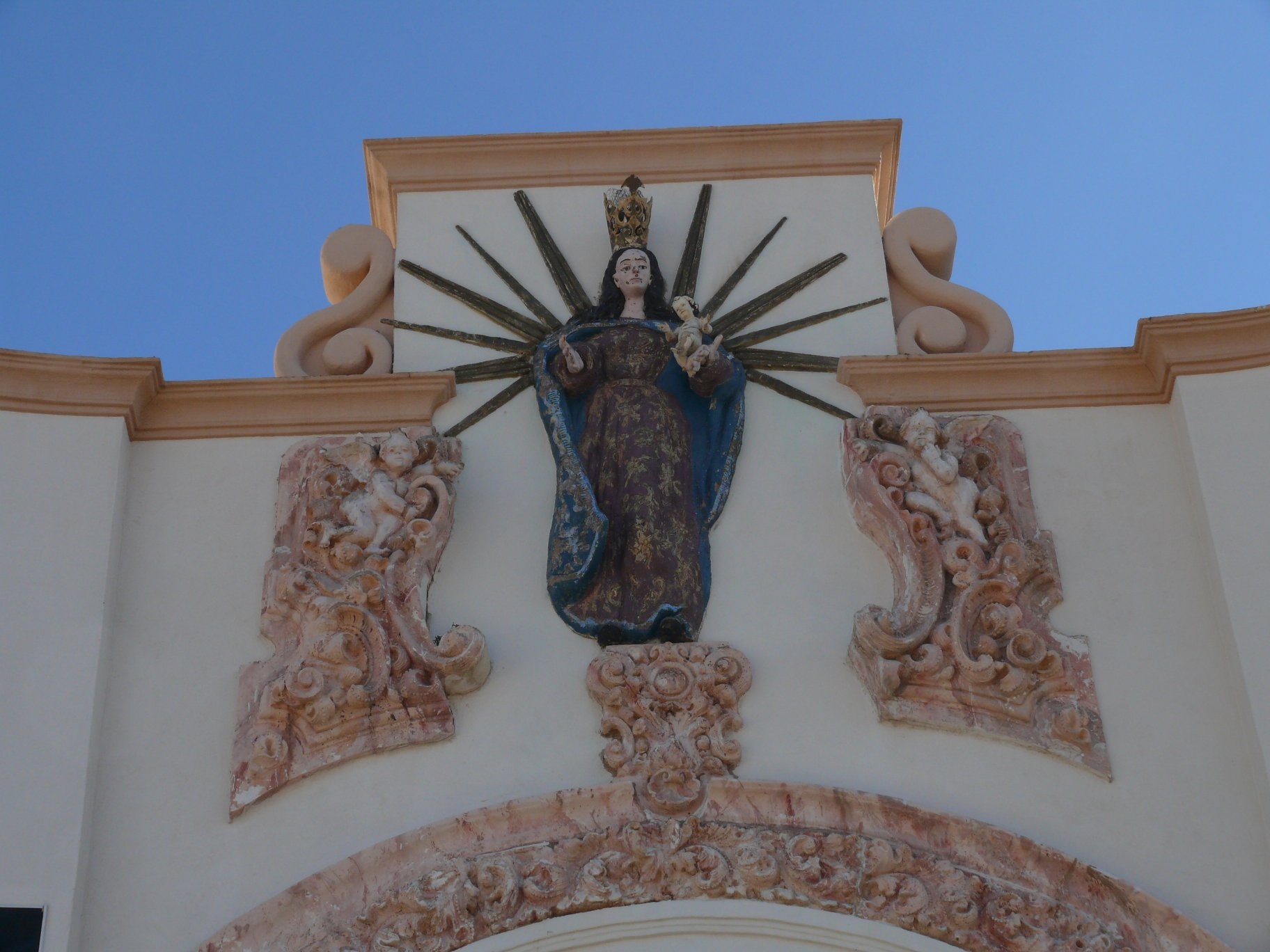
Spanish Colonial Revival–style Church of Our Lady of Health

Historical population
Census	Pop.	Note	%±
1910	3,836		—
1920	3,989		4.0%
1930	5,811		45.7%
1940	8,385		44.3%
1950	12,325		47.0%
1960	29,387		138.4%
1970	37,857		28.8%
1980	43,377		14.6%
1990	57,866		33.4%
2000	74,267		28.3%
2010	97,618		31.4%
2020	111,385		14.1%
U.S. Decennial Census; 2018 Estimate

=== 2020 census ===
Las Cruces, New Mexico – Racial and ethnic composition Note: the US census treats Hispanic/Latino as an ethnic category. This table excludes Latinos from the racial categories and assigns them to a separate category. Hispanics/Latinos may be of any race.
Race / Ethnicity (NH = Non-Hispanic)	Pop. 2000	Pop. 2010	Pop. 2020	% 2000	% 2010	% 2020
White (NH)	31,208	36,577	35,672	42.02%	37.47%	32.03%
Black or African American (NH)	1,486	1,915	2,392	2.00%	1.96%	2.15%
Native American or Alaska Native (NH)	697	861	983	0.94%	0.88%	0.88%
Asian (NH)	816	1,421	1,957	1.10%	1.46%	1.76%
Pacific Islander (NH)	34	77	76	0.05%	0.08%	0.07%
Some other race (NH)	497	136	472	0.67%	0.14%	0.42%
Mixed or multiracial (NH)	1,108	1,188	2,629	1.49%	1.22%	2.36%
Hispanic or Latino	38,421	55,443	67,204	51.73%	56.80%	60.33%
Total	74,267	97,618	111,385	100.00%	100.00%	100.00%

As of the 2020 census, Las Cruces had a population of 111,385.

Estimates for 2019 indicate that Las Cruces had a population of 103,432. Its demographics were 32.5% non-Hispanic White, 2.8% African American or Black, 1.4% Native American, 1.8% Asian, and 2.9% from two or more races: 60.5% were Hispanics or Latinos of any race. The 39,925 households had an average household size of 2.51 people each. Median household income was $43,022, and the level of people in poverty was 23.6%.

=== Census 2010 data ===
As of the 2010, census Las Cruces had a population of 97,618. The ethnic and racial makeup of the population was:

- 56.8% Hispanic and Latino Americans (Hispanics may be of any race)
- 34.3% Non-Hispanic White
- 2.4% African American or Black
- 1.7% Native Americans
- 1.6% Asian
- 0.1% Native Hawaiian and Other Pacific Islander
- 3.5% Two or more races

=== Census 2000 data ===
As of the census of 2000, 74,267 people, 29,184 households, and 18,123 families were residing in the city. The population density was 1,425.7 inhabitants per square mile (550.5/km^{2}). The 31,682 housing units had an average density of 608.2 per square mile (234.8/km^{2}). The racial makeup of the city was 69.0% White, 2.3% African American, 1.7% Native American, 1.2% Asian, 0.1% Pacific Islander, 21.6% from other races, and 4.1% from two or more races. Hispanic or Latino of any race were 51.7% of the population.

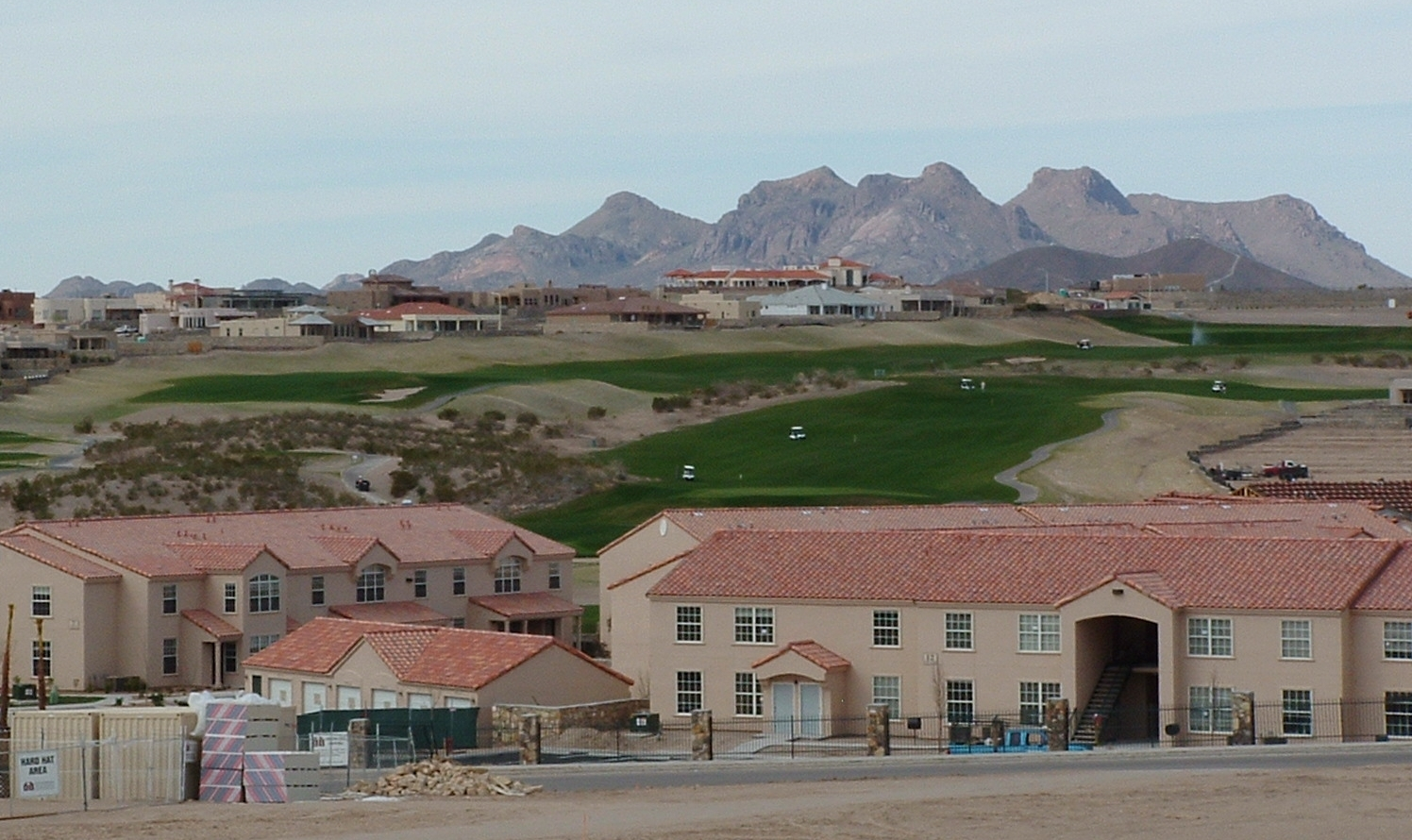
Development in East Mesa

Of the 29,184 households, 30.4% had children under 18 living with them, 42.3% were married couples living together, 15.1% had a female householder with no husband present, and 37.9% were not families. About 27.9% of all households were made up of individuals, and 8.9% had someone living alone who was 65 or older. The average household size was 2.46 and the average family size was 3.05.

In the city, the age distribution was 25.1% under 18, 16.0% from 18 to 24, 26.9% from 25 to 44, 19.0% from 45 to 64, and 13.1% who were 65 or older. The median age was 31 years. For every 100 females, there were 94.3 males. For every 100 females 18 and over, there were 91.0 males.

The median income for a household in the city was $30,375, and for a family was $37,670. Males had a median income of $30,923 versus $21,759 for females. The per capita income for the city was $15,704. About 17.2% of families and 23.3% of the population were below the poverty line, including 30.7% of those under age 18 and 9.7% of those age 65 or over.

== Economy ==
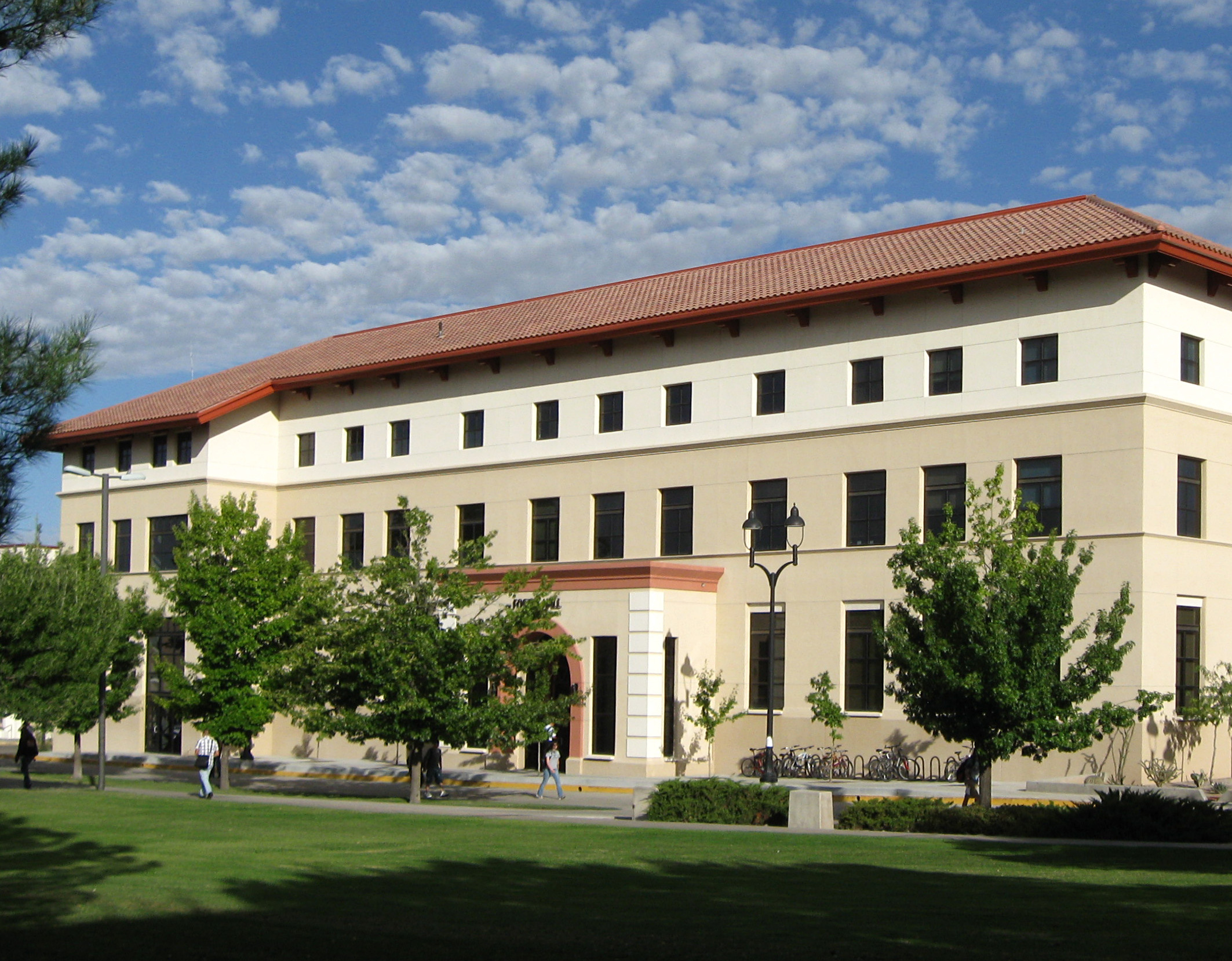
New Mexico State University

Major employers in Las Cruces include New Mexico State University, Las Cruces Public Schools, the City of Las Cruces, Memorial Medical Center, Walmart, MountainView Regional Medical Center, Doña Ana County, Doña Ana Community College, Addus HealthCare, and NASA.

=== Filming location ===
Movies and TV series shot in Las Cruces include:

- The 2018 film The Mule, written, produced, directed by, and starring Clint Eastwood, filmed for six days in and around Las Cruces.
- The 1964 pilot Calhoun: County Agent, starring Jackie Cooper and Barbara Stanwyck, was filmed in and around Las Cruces, but never aired. The process of writing and shooting the pilot is the subject of Merle Miller and Evan Rhodes's book Only You, Dick Daring!

== Arts and culture ==
Most of Las Cruces's cultural events are held late in the calendar year.

=== Gallery ===
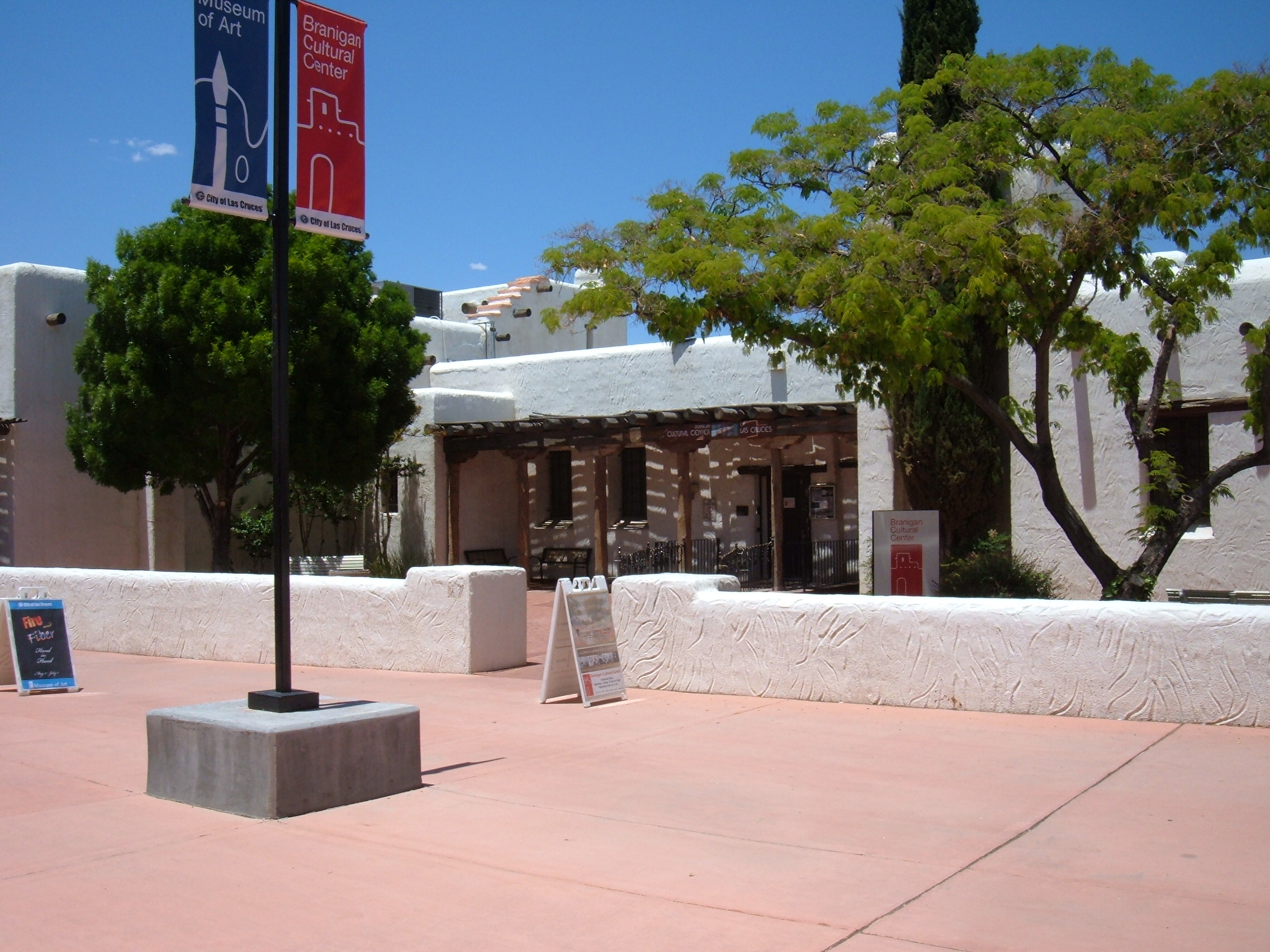
Branigan Cultural Center

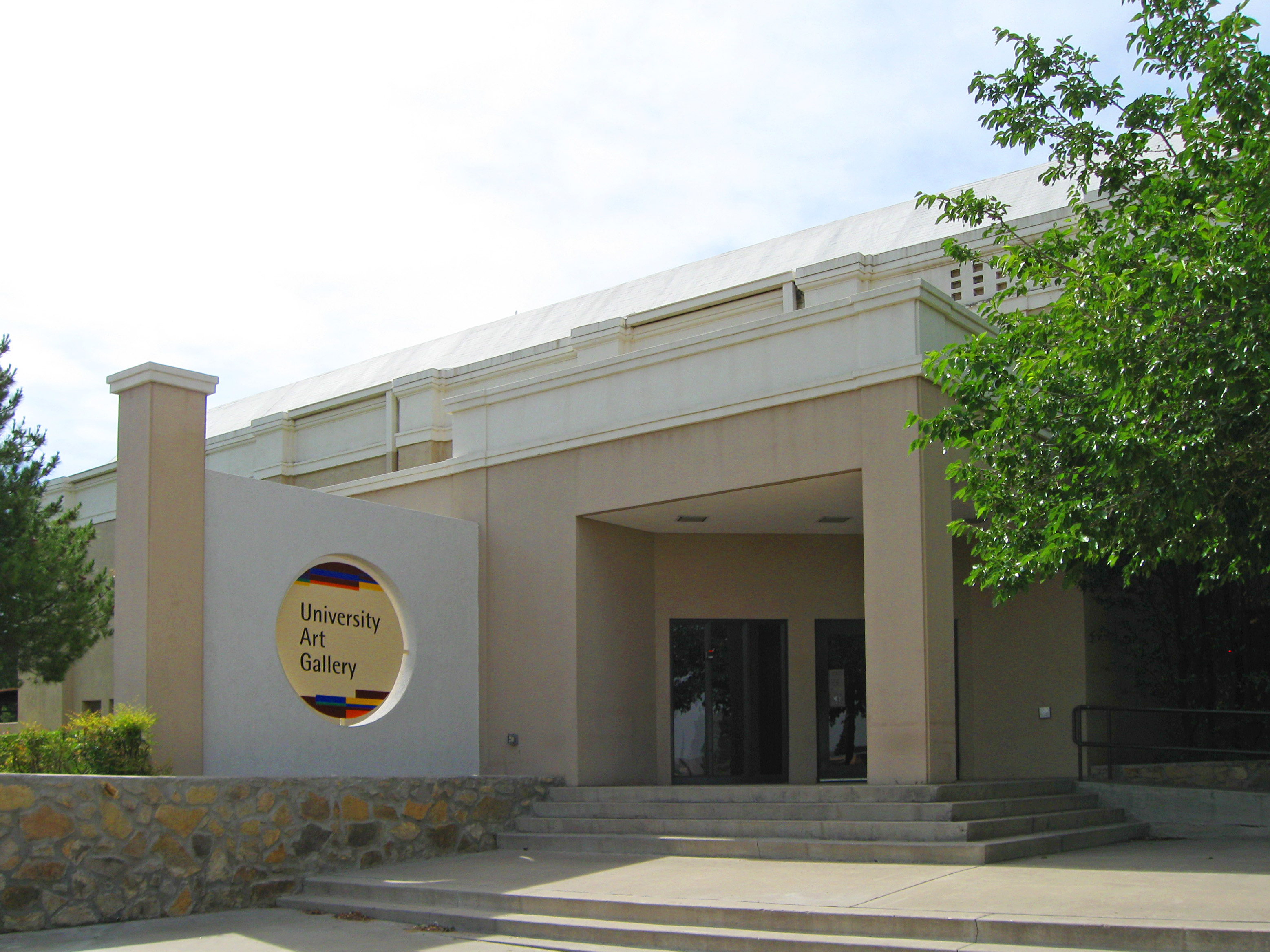
University Art Gallery

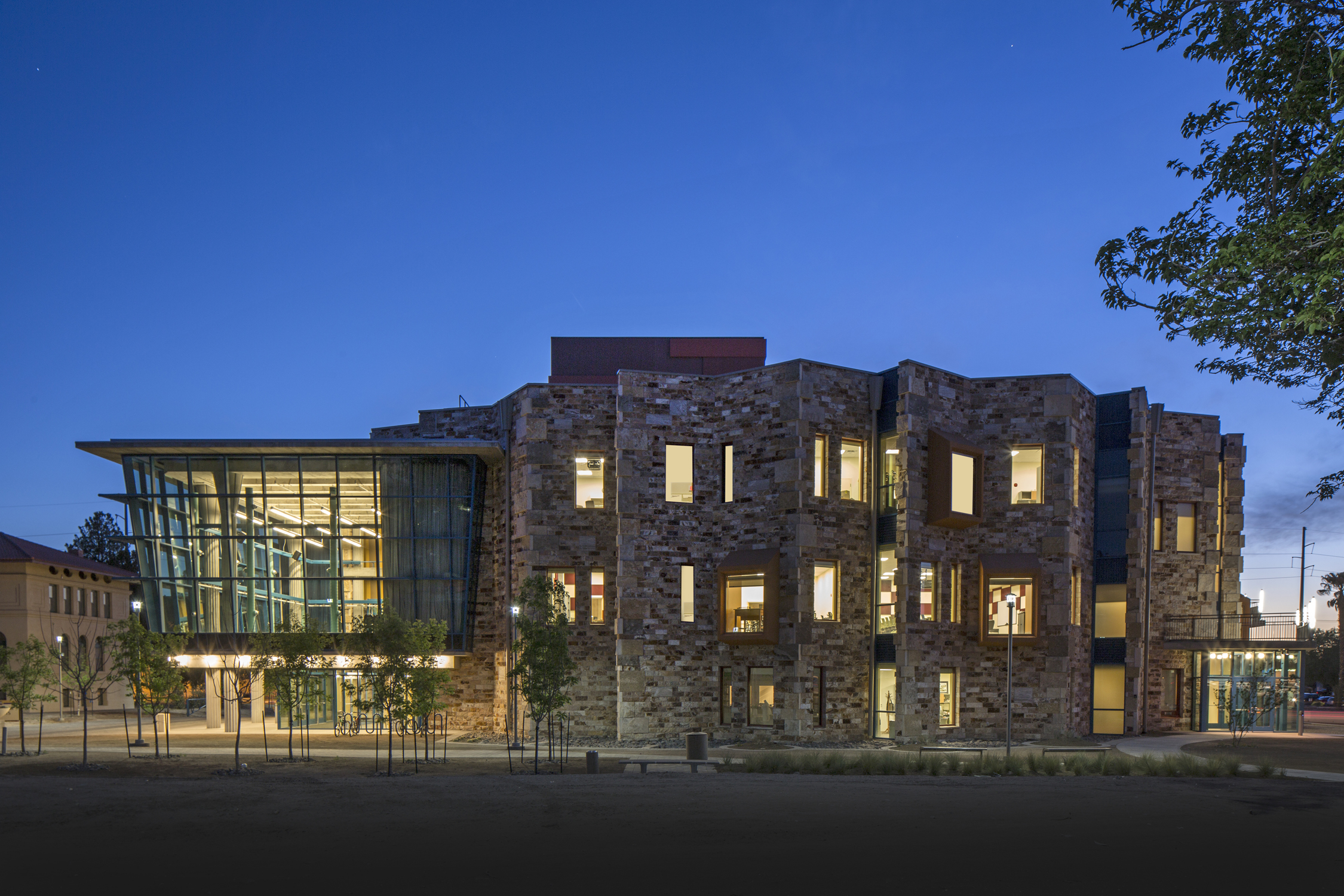
New Mexico State University Center for the Arts

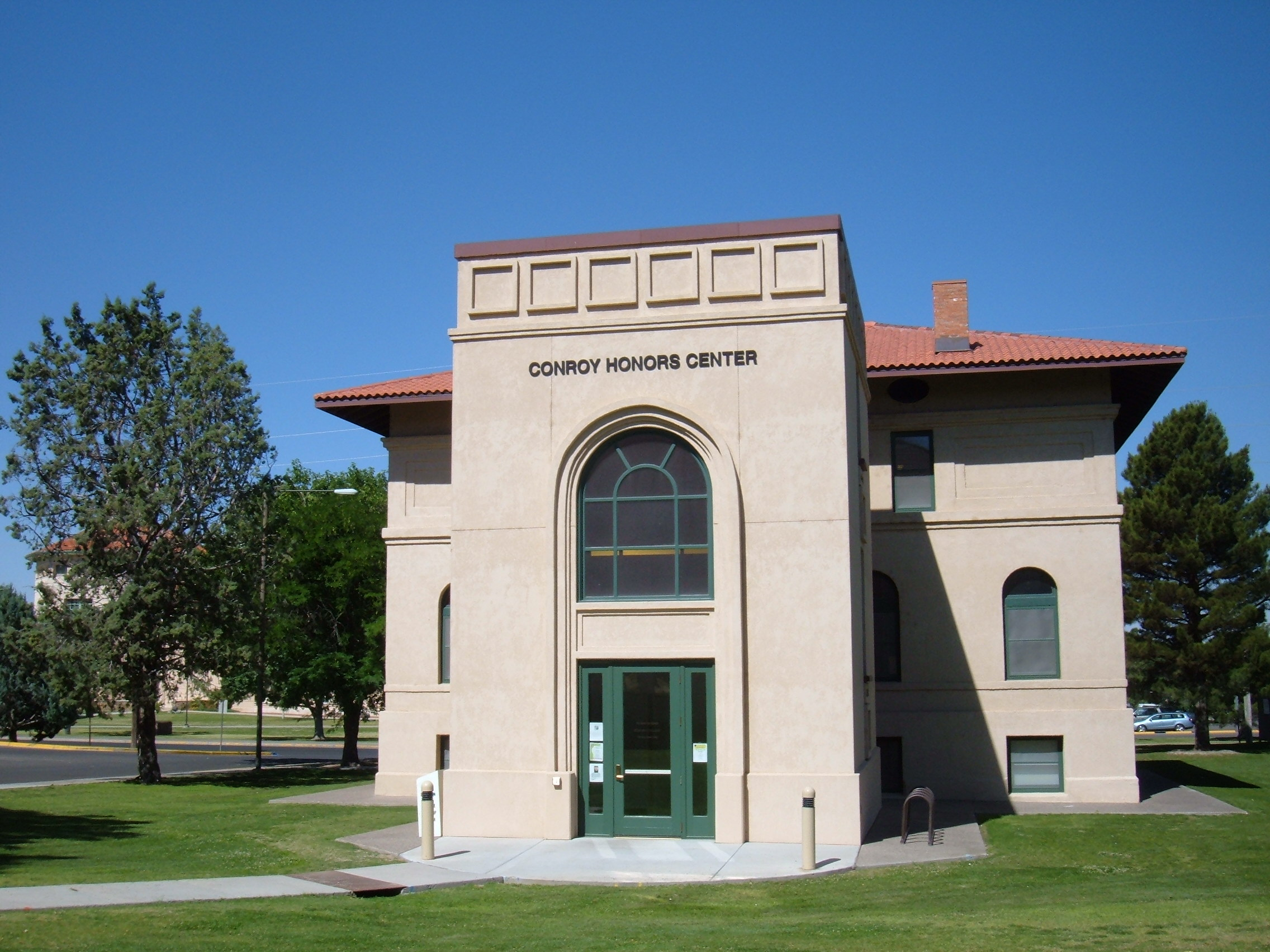
William Conroy Honors Center

=== Festivals and events ===
==== Current festivals ====
Festival name	Location	Description	Time
Cowboy Days	Farm and Ranch Heritage Museum	Children's activities, cowboy food and music, mounted shooting, horseback and stagecoach rides, living history, gunfight re-enactments, and more	Early March
Las Cruces Game Convention / CrucesCon	Las Cruces Convention Center	An annual event, gamers compete in high-level tournaments and play free games. The LCGC is a nonprofit event with 100% of the proceeds going towards the community, equipment, and future events.	March
Cinco de Mayo Celebration	Mesilla	Celebration of Mexican heritage and pride with arts, crafts, food vendors, and Mexican music	May 3–4
Southern New Mexico Wine Festival	Fairgrounds	Exclusively features New Mexico wines, local foods, live music, and the University of Wine for food and wine pairings	Memorial Day weekend
July 4 Electric Light Parade, Celebration and Fireworks	Field of Dreams Football Stadium	Parade and fireworks display celebrating Independence Day	July 3 and 4
Harvest Wine Festival	Fairgrounds	Features wines from New Mexico wineries, a grape-stomping contest, several concerts throughout the weekend, food from several local vendors, and related shopping	Labor Day weekend
Southern New Mexico State Fair	Fairgrounds	Promoting traditional agriculture, the fair boasts one of the largest junior livestock shows in the state; the fair also invites youth from six counties in New Mexico and West Texas to participate.	First week of October
Pumpkin Harvest Festival	Lyles Farms	Features live music and the Tour de Maze (an adults-only tricycle race), as well as Pumpkin Pie and a Goblin Egg Gourd Hunt	Month of October
Day of the Walking Dead	Mesilla Valley Mall	Zombies walk around the mall.	Halloween
Day of the Dead (Día de los Muertos)	Plaza in Mesilla, and Branigan Cultural Center	Originating in Mexico, this celebration of the lives of those now dead hasa focus on Mexican heritage. It is put on by the Calavera Coalition, a nonprofit organization.	November 1–2
Renaissance ArtsFaire	Young Park	Founded in 1971, it includes a juried art show and is put on by the Doña Ana Arts Council.	November
Lighting of the Mesilla Plaza	Historic plaza of Mesilla	Every Christmas Eve, the historic plaza of Mesilla is lined with thousands of luminarias, which are brown bags containing candles and weighted with sand. The evening consistently attracts locals and tourists.	Christmas Eve
Las Cruces Chile Drop	Plaza de Las Cruces	Since 2014, a vibrant 19-foot (5.8 m) New Mexico chile, adorned with 400 feet (120 m) of LED lighting, has marked the arrival of the new year, as it descends from a crane in the plaza in downtown Las Cruces. This unique celebration has become an annual tradition, accompanied by live music, a piñata, and carnival games. In 2021, the event introduced an interactive element, allowing attendees to vote on the chile's color by scanning a QR code. The event achieved national recognition in 2023, ranking third on USA Today's list of Best New Year's Eve Drops. Additionally, in the same year, it garnered significant attention with a live broadcast on CNN, attracted over 5,000 participants, and received a visit from Congressman Gabe Vasquez and Mayor Eric Enriquez.	New Year's Eve

==== Past festivals ====
Festival name	Location	Description	Time
Border Book Festival	Mesilla	Once it featured a trade show, readings, film festival, workshops led by local artists and writers, and discussion panels, but ended its 20-year run in April 2015. The festival was founded in 1994 by authors Denise Chávez and Susan Tweit; Chávez was the executive director of the festival.	April
The Whole Enchilada Fiesta	1501 E. Hadley Ave.	It attracted roughly 50,000 attendees each year. The centerpiece was the making of a large, flat enchilada. The fiesta started in 1980 with a 6-foot-diameter (1.8 m) enchilada, and it grew over the years. In 2000, the fiesta's 10 1/2-foot-diameter (3.2 m) enchilada was certified by Guinness World Records as the world's largest. After the enchilada was assembled, it was cut into many pieces and distributed free of charge to the fiesta attendees. The enchilada was the brainchild of local restaurant owner Roberto V. Estrada, who directed its preparation each year. The celebration also featured a parade, the Whole Enchilada Fiesta Queen competition, a huachas tournament, activities for kids, live music, an enchilada eating contest, a 5 kilometer road race, a one-mile race, and a car and motorcycle show. After 34 years, The Whole Enchilada Fiesta's final event occurred in 2014 after Estrada had retired.	Last week in September

=== Museums ===
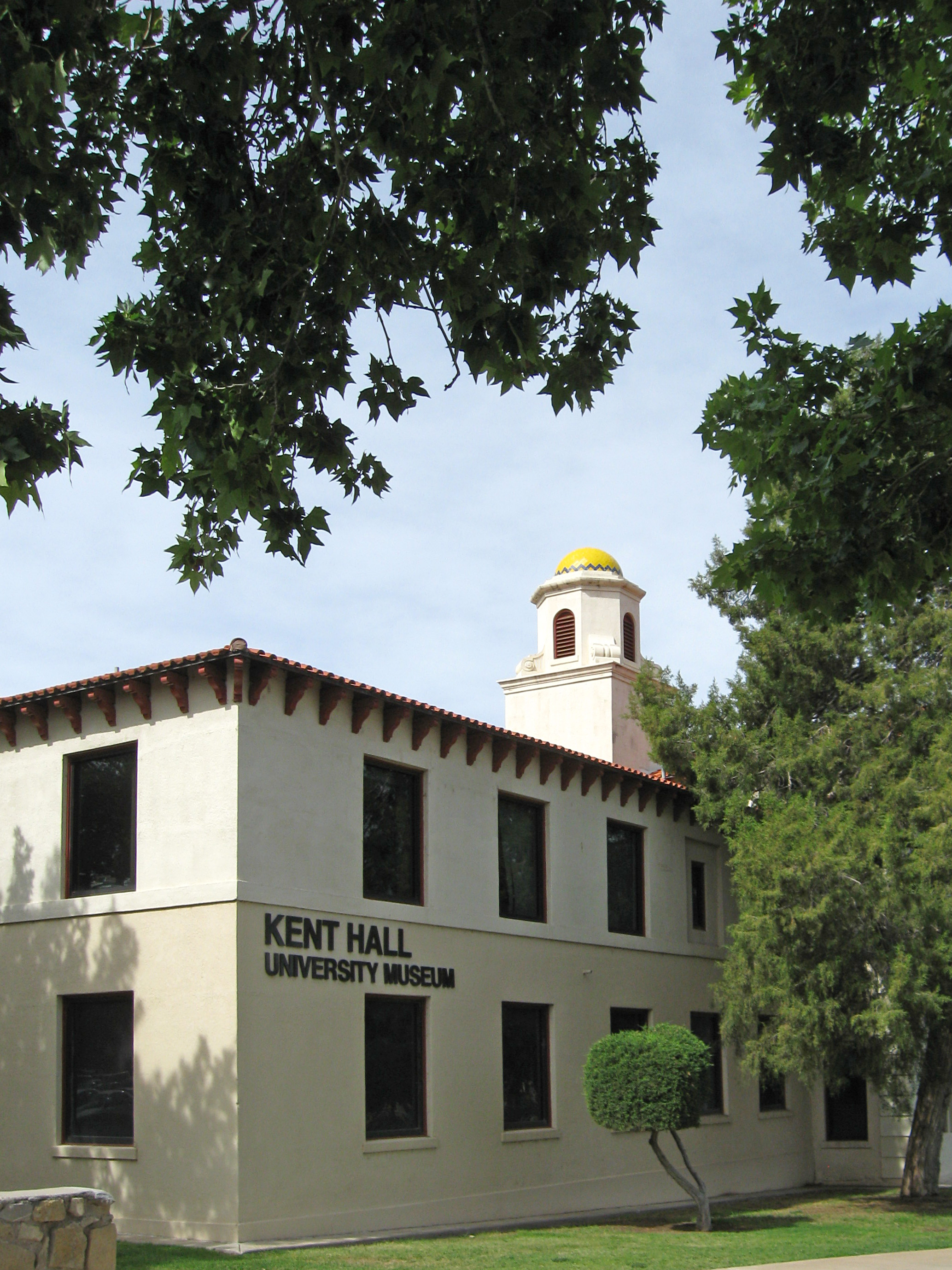
New Mexico State University Museum

The New Mexico Farm and Ranch Heritage Museum is state-operated and shows the history of farming and ranching in New Mexico. It is located just east of New Mexico State University.

The New Mexico State University Arthropod Museum and Collection contains roughly 500,000 arthropod specimens. The University Museum (Kent Hall) at New Mexico State University focuses on archeological and ethnographic collections and also has some history and natural-science collections.

The Zuhl Museum (located in the Alumni and Visitors' Center) at New Mexico State University focuses on geologic collections, including the finest collection of petrified wood on display and a large fossil and mineral collection.

The four city-owned museums include the Branigan Cultural Center, which examines local history through photographs, sculpture, paintings, and poetry. The building is on the National Register of Historic Places. The Las Cruces Museum of Art offers art exhibits and classes. The Las Cruces Museum of Natural History makes science and natural history more accessible to the general public and has an emphasis on local animals and plants. The Las Cruces Railroad Museum is in the historic Santa Fe Railroad station. It exhibits the impact of the railroads on the local area.

=== Las Cruces Symphony ===
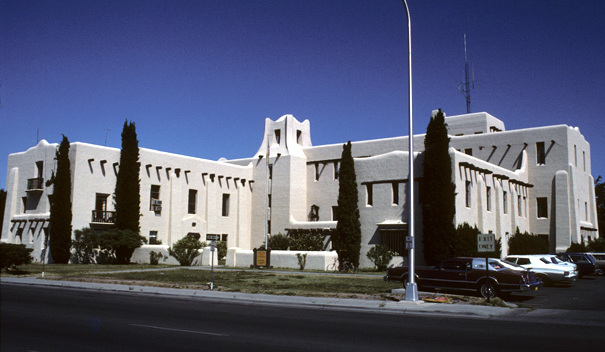
Doña Ana County courthouse

The Las Cruces Symphony Orchestra is an 80-member orchestra, conducted by Dr. Ming Luke. The orchestra consists of 47% students, 17% NMSU faculty, 20% other local musicians, and 16% professionals from outside Las Cruces. The venue of the orchestra is the NMSU Music Center Recital Hall. The orchestra received attention with the world premiere of Bill McGlaughlin's Remembering Icarus, a tribute to local radio pioneer Ralph Willis Goddard, performed by the LCSO on October 1, 2005. The performance was taped and broadcast nationally on NPR's Performance Today on December 9, 2005 and on July 4, 2007, on Performance Today and on Sirius Satellite Radio.

=== Points of interest ===
Several water tanks in Las Cruces have been painted with murals by Tony Pennock, including one at the intersection of Triviz Drive and Griggs Avenue. Multimedia artist group Keep Adding has a large mural titled Wave Nest on Picacho Avenue at the Lion's Park.

The Cathedral of the Immaculate Heart of Mary is the mother church of the Roman Catholic Diocese of Las Cruces.

== Sports ==
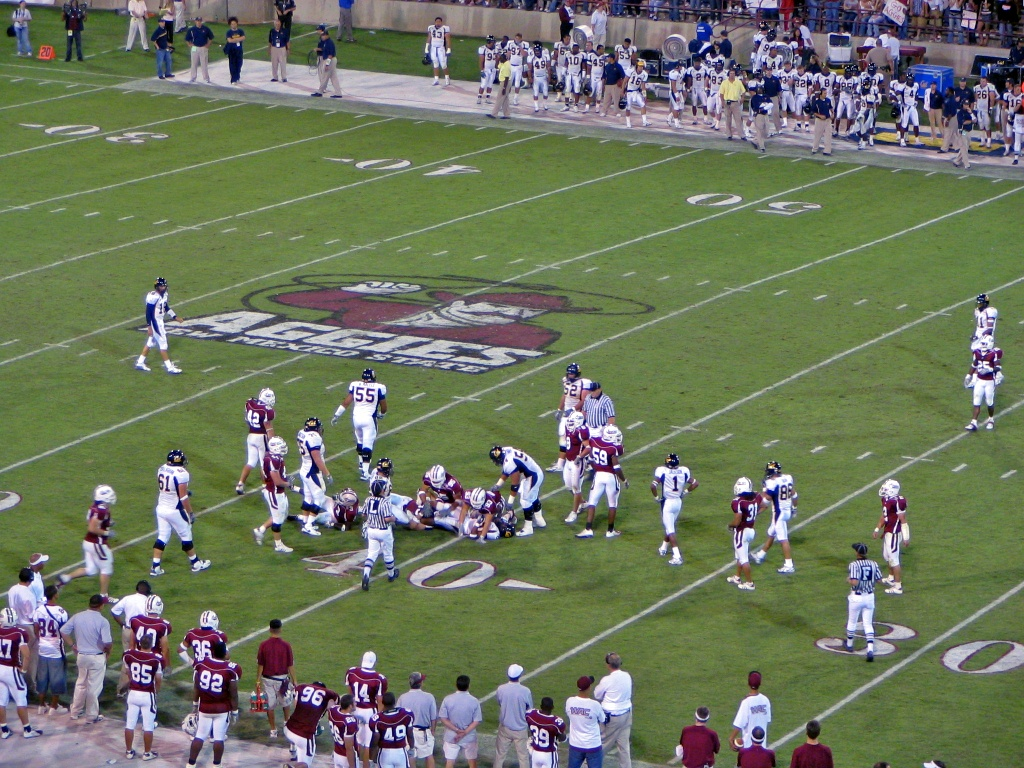
The New Mexico State Aggies play at Aggie Memorial Stadium.

Las Cruces is the home of Vado Speedway Park, a 3/8th-mile dirt track that hosts the annual Wild West Shootout.

At the university level, the New Mexico State Aggies compete in Conference USA for various sports, such as men's and women's basketball, as well as football. Aggies men's basketball has had a rich history of success. Between 2010 and 2019, the Aggies made the NCAA tournament eight times. The team also reached the Final Four of the tournament in 1970. The 2014–15 NMSU women's basketball team reached the NCAA tournament for the first time since 1988, when it won both the WAC regular season and tournament championships.

The Las Cruces Kings have been a long-running semiprofessional football team in the city.

Beginning in the 2010 season, the Las Cruces Vaqueros were the first professional sports team in Las Cruces. In the 2011 season, the Vaqueros joined the Pecos League of Professional Baseball Clubs against the White Sands Pupfish, Roswell Invaders, Ruidoso Osos, Alpine Cowboys and Carlsbad Bats. The Vaqueros played in the Pecos League of Professional Baseball Clubs for the 2011–2013 seasons. The team returned for the 2015 season, but structural damage to their home ballpark in January 2016 forced them to sit out the 2016 season. They planned to return for the 2017 season.

== Parks and recreation ==
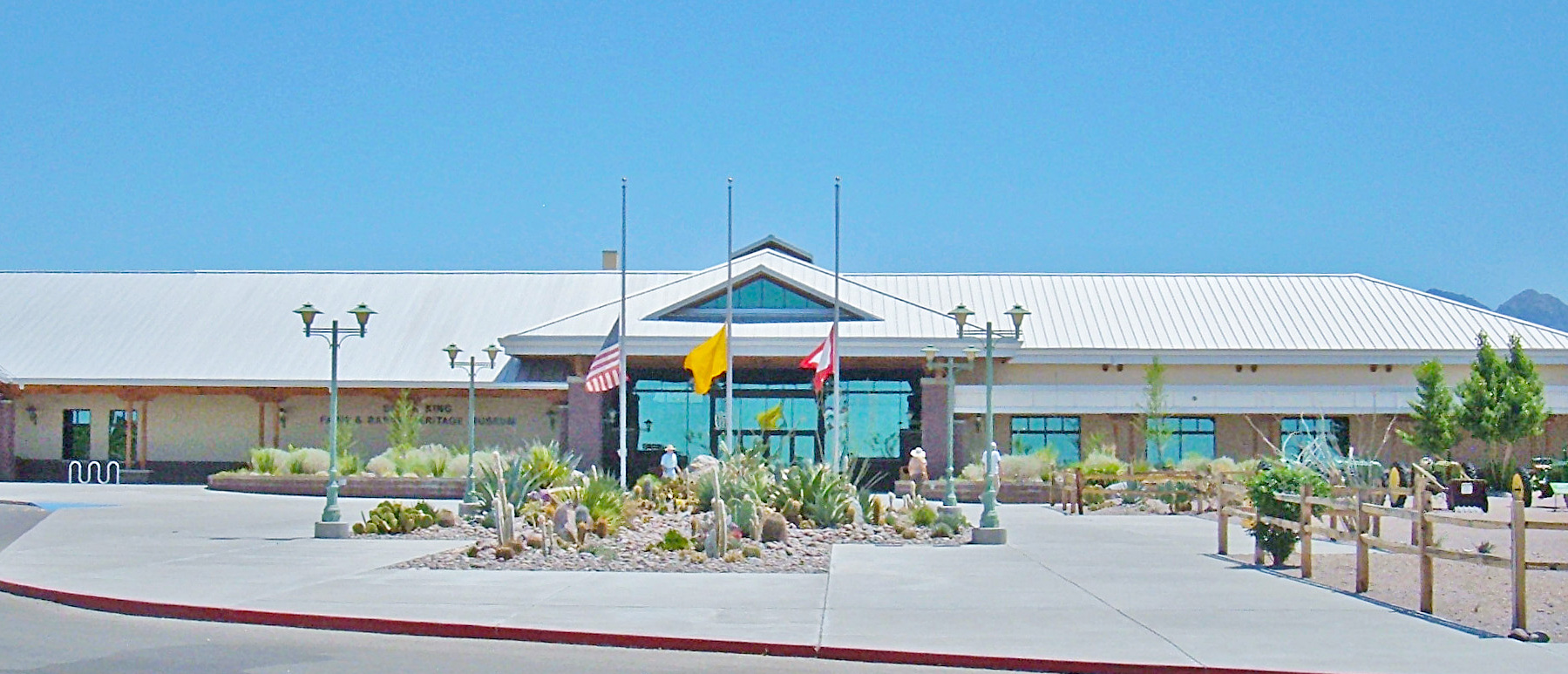
New Mexico Farm and Ranch Heritage Museum

Las Cruces operates 87 city parks, 18 tennis courts, and four golf courses. A list of parks, with facilities and maps, is available.

Las Cruces holds a Ciclovía, a citywide event featuring exercise and physical activities, on the last Sunday of each month at Meerscheidt Recreation Center.

The New Mexico Farm and Ranch Heritage Museum is a 47-acre (190,000 m2) interactive museum that chronicles New Mexico's 3,000-year history of farming and ranching. The museum is part of the New Mexico Department of Cultural Affairs.

== Government ==
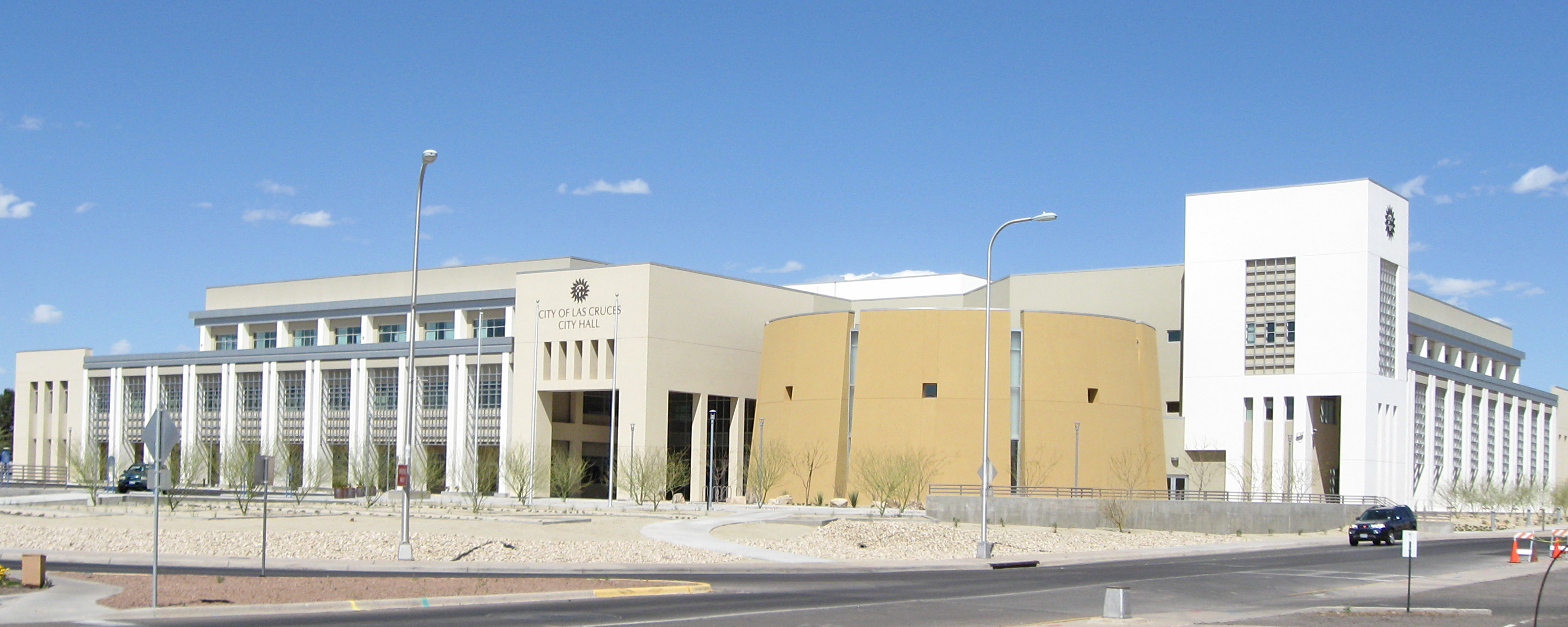
Las Cruces City Hall

Las Cruces is a charter city (also called a home rule city) and has a council–manager form of government. The city council consists of six councilors and the mayor, who chairs the meetings. The mayor is elected at-large, and each of the city councilors represents one neighborhood district within the city. Each resident of Las Cruces is thus represented by the mayor and by one city councilor. The mayor and city council members serve staggered four-year terms. As of the 2024, the mayor is Eric Enriquez. Councilors are Cassie McClure, Dist. 1; Bill Mattiace, Dist. 2; Becki Graham, Dist. 3; Johana Bencomo, Dist. 4; Becky Corran, Dist. 5; Yvonne Flores, Dist. 6. Live and archived video of city council meetings are available anytime at Las Cruces, NM. In the November 2019 municipal election, ranked-choice voting was used for the first time.

== Education ==
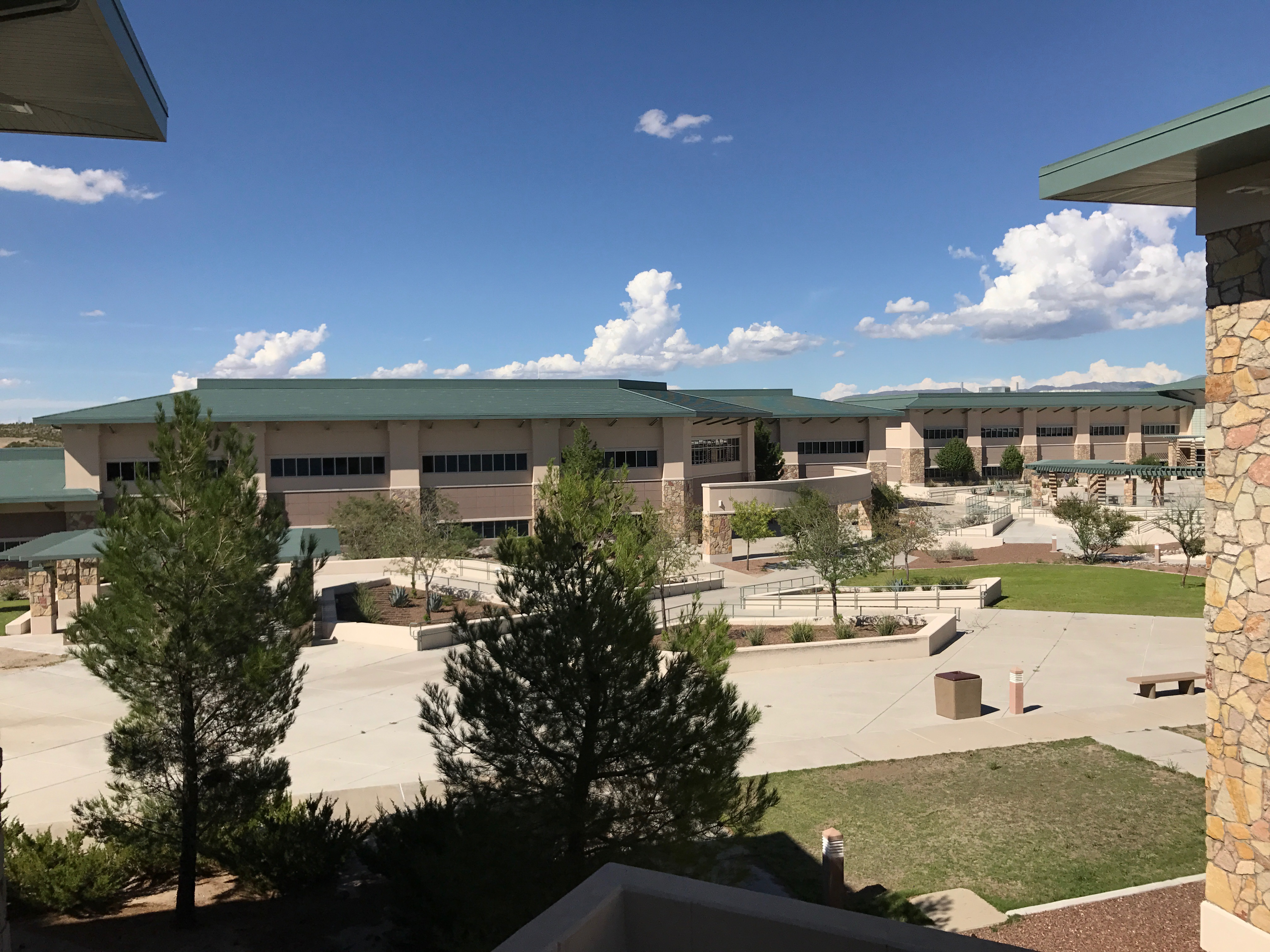
Doña Ana Community College

=== Public schools ===
Public schools are in the Las Cruces Public School District, which covers the city of Las Cruces, as well as White Sands Missile Range, the settlement of Doña Ana, and the town of Mesilla. The system has 26 elementary schools, nine middle schools, and six high schools. Of the high schools, Rio Grande Preparatory Institute is an alternative high school.

Four charter schools are within the Las Cruces Public Schools. Alma d'arte is a high school with a focus on an integrated arts curriculum. Las Montañas is a charter high school that opened in fall 2007 and caters to at-risk students. New America High School offers schooling for young and older adults who want to go back to school for their diploma or GED. Academia Dolores Huerta Middle School is the only recognized dual language program in the state.

New Mexico School for the Deaf operates a preschool facility in Las Cruces.

==== High schools ====
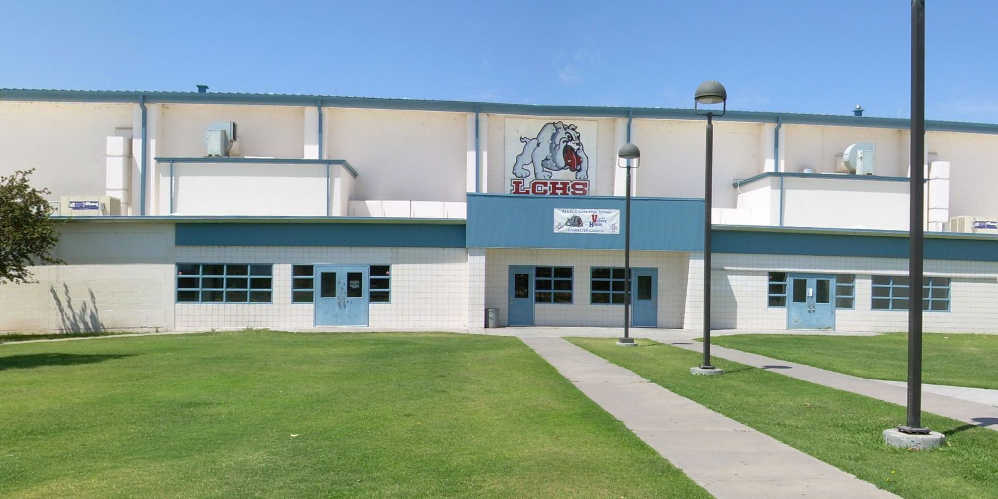
Las Cruces High School campus

- Arrowhead Park Early College High School and Medical Academy
- Centennial High School
- Las Cruces High School
- Mayfield High School
- Organ Mountain High School
- Alma d'arte Charter High School

=== Private schools ===
Five private Christian schools operate in Las Cruces. College Heights Kindergarten is a private Christian kindergarten, founded in 1954. Desert Springs Christian Academy, Las Cruces Catholic Schools, Mesilla Valley Christian School, and a small independent Baptist school called Cornerstone Christian Academy are other Christian schools in the area.

A secular nonprofit private school, Las Cruces Academy offers kindergarten through grade eight, with plans to eventually enroll up to grade 12.

=== Colleges and universities ===
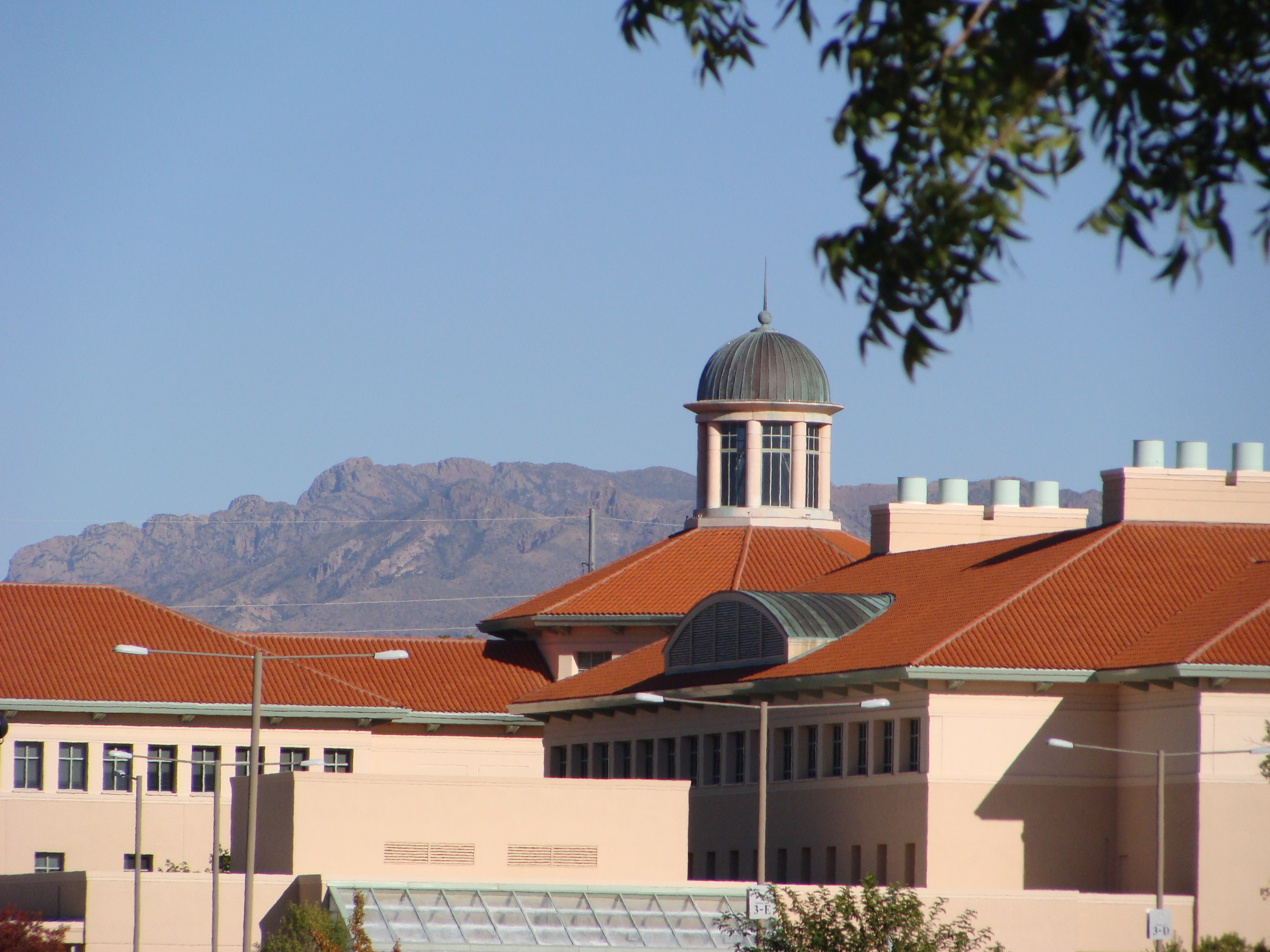
The main campus of the New Mexico State University is adjacent to the Las Cruces city limits.

New Mexico State University (NMSU) is a land-grant university; its main campus is adjacent to, but outside, the city limits. The school was founded in 1888 as Las Cruces College, an agricultural college, and in 1889, the school became New Mexico College of Agriculture and Mechanic Arts. It received its present name, New Mexico State University, in 1960. The NMSU Las Cruces campus had about 18,500 students enrolled as of fall 2012, and had a faculty-to-student ratio of about one to 19. NMSU offers a wide range of programs and awards associate, bachelor's, master's, and doctoral degrees through its main campus and four community colleges. For 10 consecutive years, NMSU has been rated as one of America's 100 Best College Buys for offering "the very highest quality education at the lowest cost" by Institutional Research & Evaluation Inc., an independent research and consulting organization for higher education. NMSU is one of only two land-grant institutions classified as Hispanic-serving by the federal government. The university is home to New Mexico's NASA Space Grant Program and is one of 52 institutions in the United States to be designated a Space Grant College. During its most recent review by NASA, NMSU was one of only 12 space grant programs in the country to receive an excellent rating.

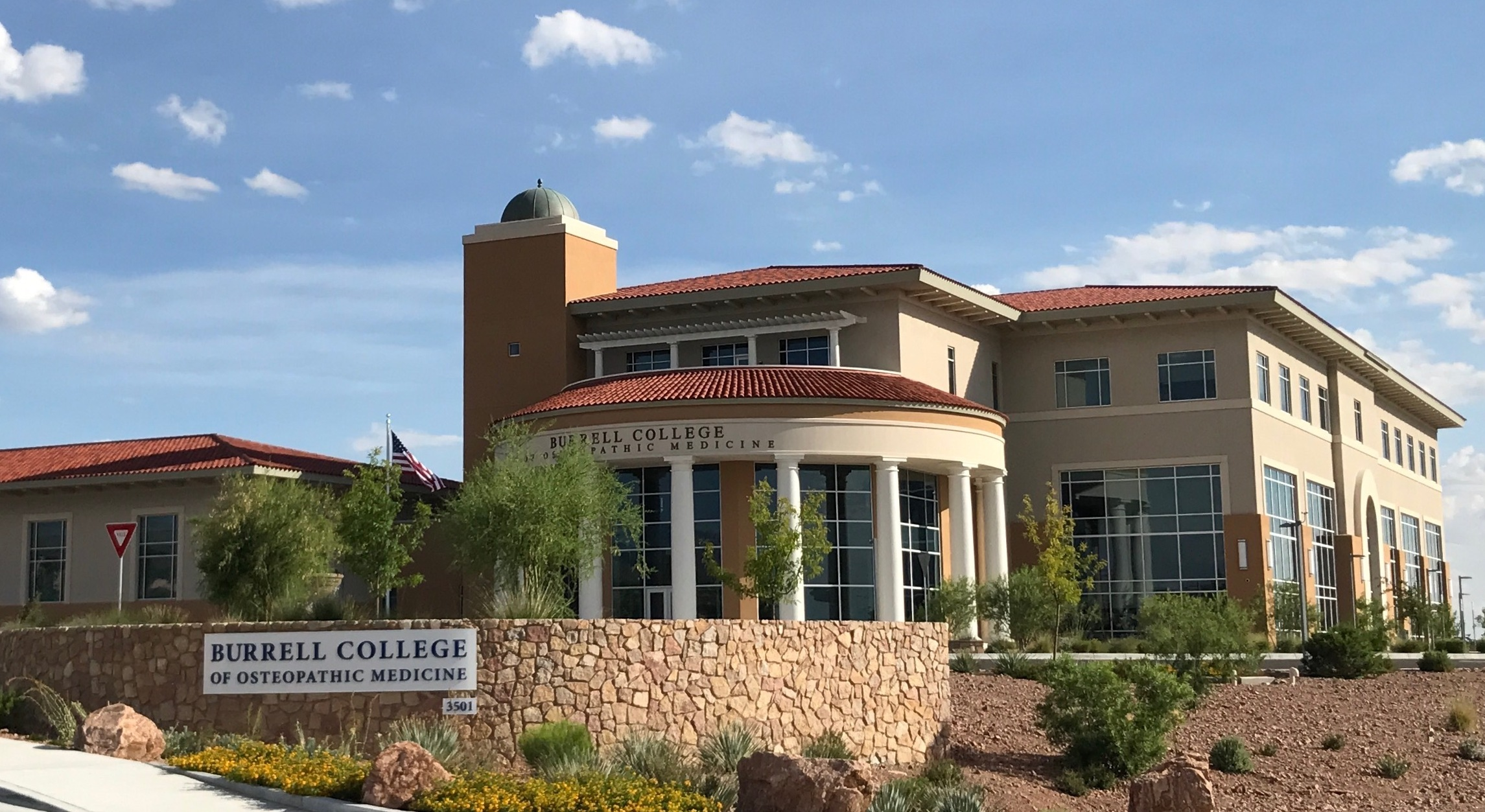
Burrell College of Osteopathic Medicine

The Burrell College of Osteopathic Medicine (BCOM), a private osteopathic medical school, opened on the campus of NMSU in 2013. The first class began instruction in August 2016.

Doña Ana Community College is a branch of New Mexico State University. When it first opened in 1973, it had 500 students in six programs. In the 2015–2016 school year, there were 4,997 full-time equivalent credit enrollments and 4,246 non-credit students, served by 136 full-time faculty, 401 part-time instructors, together with 225 full-time staff and 55 part-time staff.

DACC operates centers in Anthony, Sunland Park, Chaparral, and White Sands Missile Range. In Las Cruces, its central campus is at 3400 S. Espina Street, and its East Mesa campus is at 2800 Sonoma Ranch Boulevard. Community Education is available at all centers and campuses and also in Las Cruces at the Mesquite Neighborhood Learning Center at 804 N. Tornillo, and Workforce Center at 2345 E. Nevada Street.

=== Libraries ===
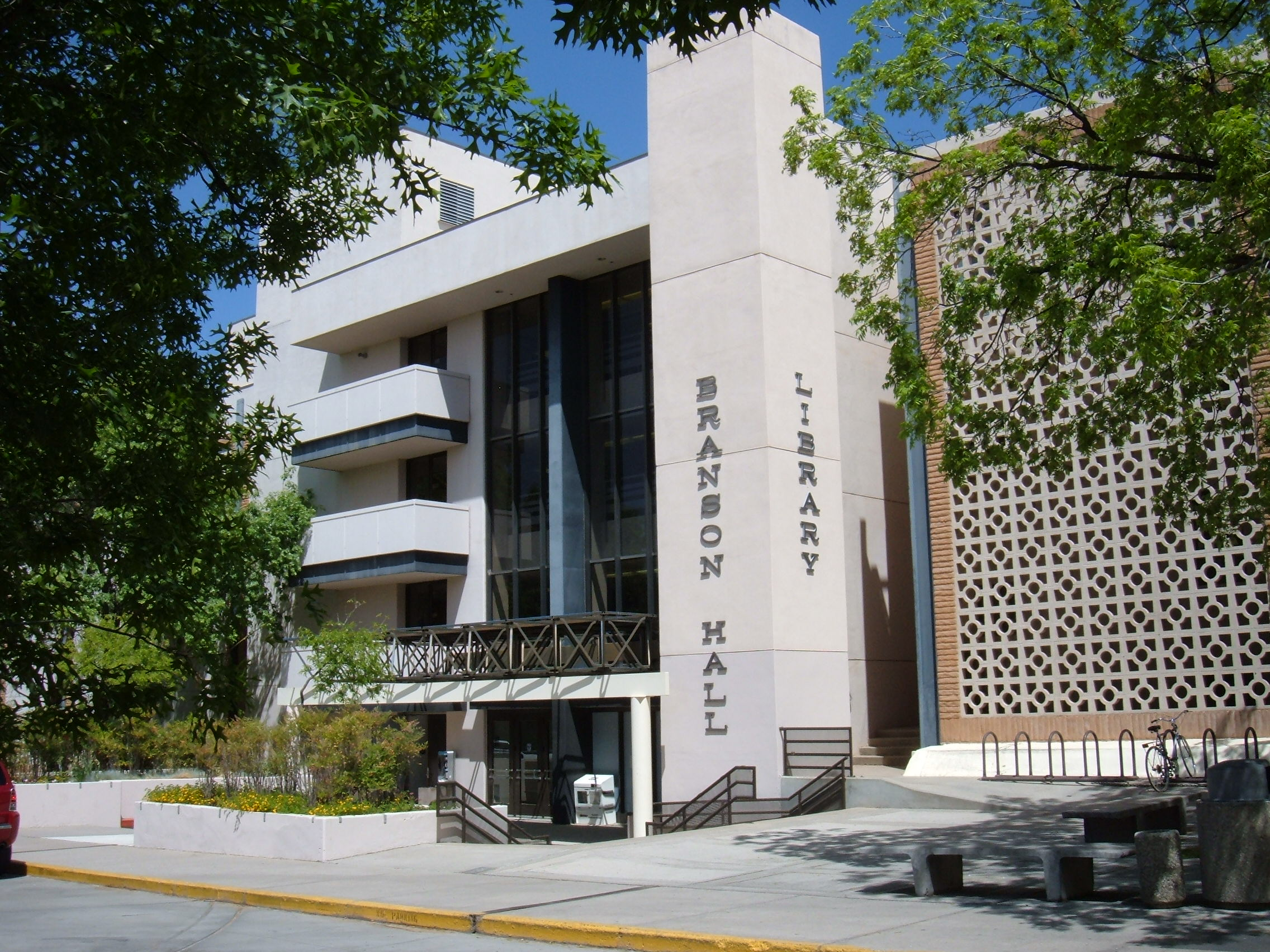
Branson Library

Thomas Branigan Memorial Library is the city's public library. It was constructed in 1979 and has a collection of about 185,000 items. The previous library building, also called Thomas Branigan Memorial Library, opened in 1935. That building is now the Branigan Cultural Center. and is on the National Register of Historic Places. Other public libraries include the Munson Branch Library as well as the Sage Café Branch Library.

The two university libraries at the New Mexico State University campus, Branson Library and Zuhl Library, are open to the public. Any New Mexico resident can check out items from these libraries.

== Media ==
Las Cruces is part of the El Paso – Las Cruces Designated Market Area (DMA) as defined by Nielsen Media Research. The City of Las Cruces operates CLC-TV cable channel 20, an Emmy award-winning 24-hour government-access television (GATV) and educational-access television channel on Comcast cable TV in Las Cruces. CLC-TV televises live and recorded Las Cruces city council meetings, Doña Ana County commission meetings, and Las Cruces School board meetings. The channel had previously televised City Beat, a monthly news magazine, hosted by Jennifer Martinez, with information directly related to the City of Las Cruces. The program is no longer available, but segments can still be found on YouTube.com/Clctv20. Also available for viewing are health news and other government and education-related programming, as well as current weather reports and road and traffic information. CLC-TV is not a public-access television cable TV channel. In addition to a 2009 Emmy Award by the Rocky Mountain Southwest Chapter of the National Academy of Television Arts and Sciences, CLC-TV received a first- and third-place award by the National Association of Telecommunications Officers and Advisors and five national Telly Awards, four platinum and one gold.

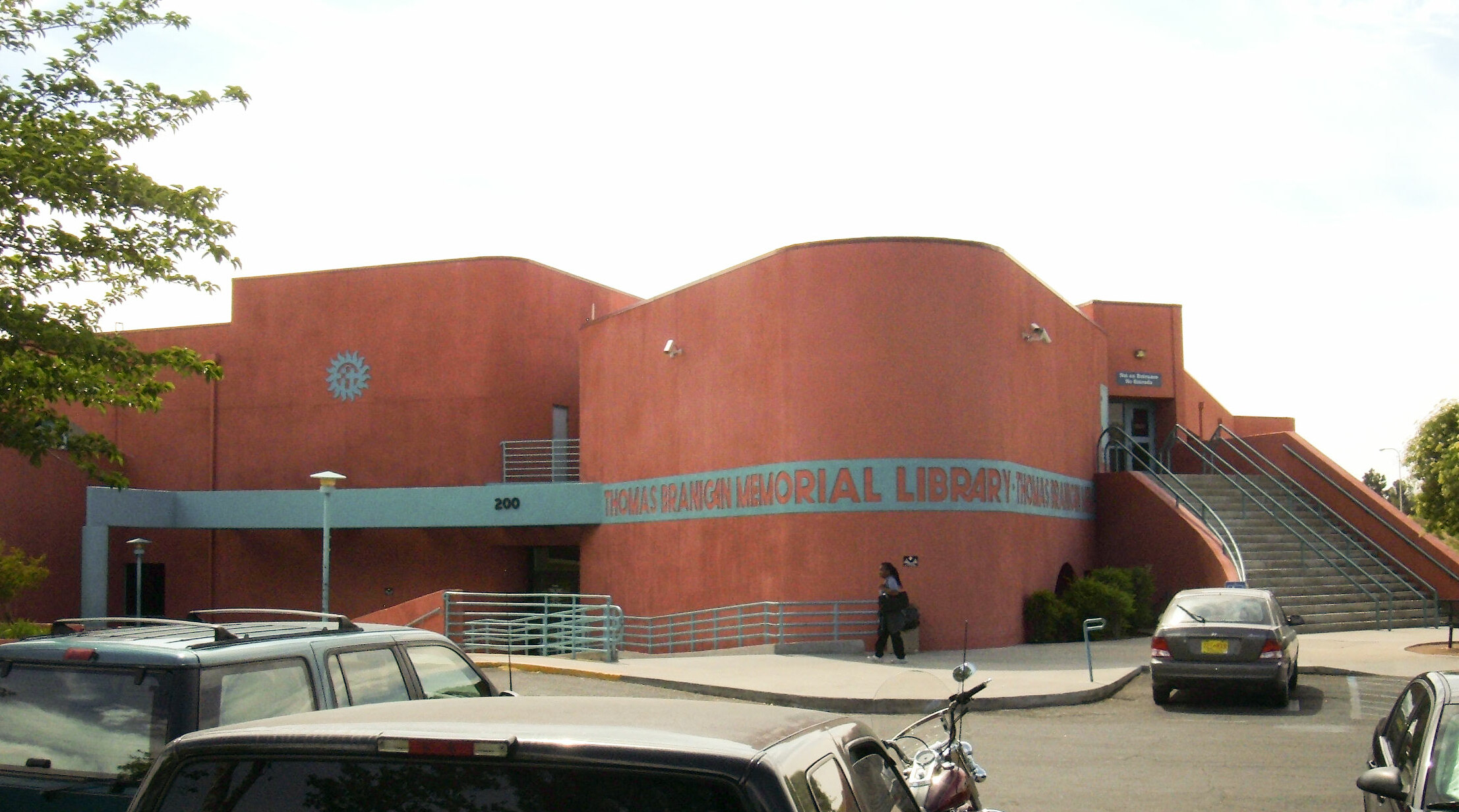
Thomas Branigan Memorial Library

Las Cruces Sun-News is a daily newspaper published in Las Cruces by the USA Today Co. Las Cruces Bulletin is a weekly community newspaper published in Las Cruces by FIG Publications, LLC. It is tabloid size and covers local news, business, arts, sports, and homes. The Round Up is the student newspaper at NMSU. It is tabloid size and published twice weekly. The Ink is a monthly tabloid published in Las Cruces, covering the arts and community events in southern New Mexico and West Texas.

Las Cruces has one television station, the PBS outlet KRWG-TV, operated by NMSU. The Telemundo outlet KTDO is licensed in Las Cruces, but serves El Paso. The city also receives several Albuquerque, El Paso, and Ciudad Juárez stations. Las Cruces is in Nielsen Media Research's El Paso/Las Cruces television media market.

Las Cruces has one local commercial independent cable television station called "The Las Cruces Channel" (LCC98). It can be seen on Comcast cable channel 98. LCC-98 is not a public-access television channel. The channel airs programs that are produced locally in their studio facility and by outside producers.

About 10 commercial radio stations broadcast in the Las Cruces area, running a variety of formats. Four of these stations are owned by Adams Radio Group and four are owned by Bravo Mic Communications, LLC, a Las Cruces company. The local NPR outlet is KRWG-FM, operated by NMSU, which also operates a college radio station, KRUX. KRUC is a Spanish-language station in Las Cruces. Many El Paso stations are received in Las Cruces. See list of radio stations in New Mexico for a complete list of stations. Las Cruces is in Arbitron's Las Cruces media market.

== Infrastructure ==
=== Transportation ===
==== Airports ====
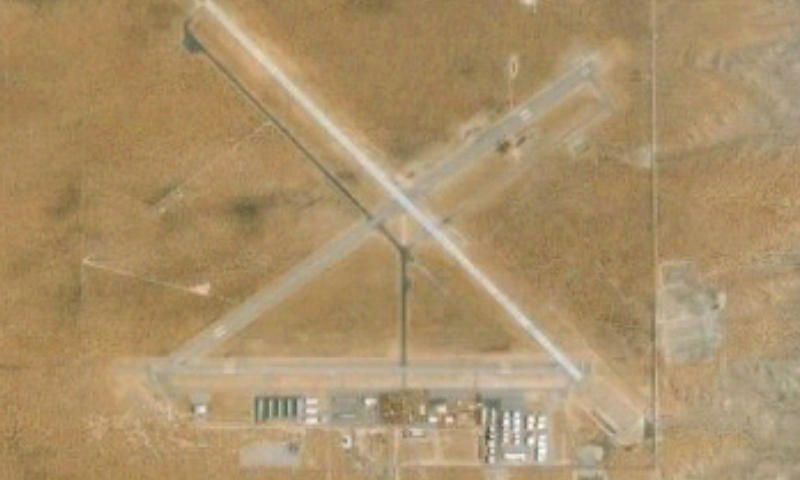
Las Cruces International Airport

- Las Cruces International Airport currently offers service with Advanced Air to Albuquerque. Prior to the start of this service, it had had no regularly scheduled commercial passenger flights since July 25, 2005, when Westward Airways ceased operations. General aviation, New Mexico Army National Guard (four UH-72 Lakota helicopters), private charters, and the Civil Air Patrol use the airport, among others.

==== Major highways ====
- Interstate 10, east–west travel: south-southeast to El Paso, Texas; west to Tucson, Arizona
- Interstate 25, north–south travel: north to Albuquerque, Las Cruces is the southern terminus for Interstate 25, where it intersects Interstate 10.
- U.S. Route 70, east–west travel: northeast to Alamogordo, to the west it is merged with Interstate 10.
- U.S. Route 85 (unsigned; follows I-25 north to Albuquerque and I-10/US-180 east to El Paso)
- U.S. Route 180
- NM 28
- NM 101
- NM 185
- NM 188
- NM 292
- NM 320
- NM 373
- NM 478

==== Rail ====
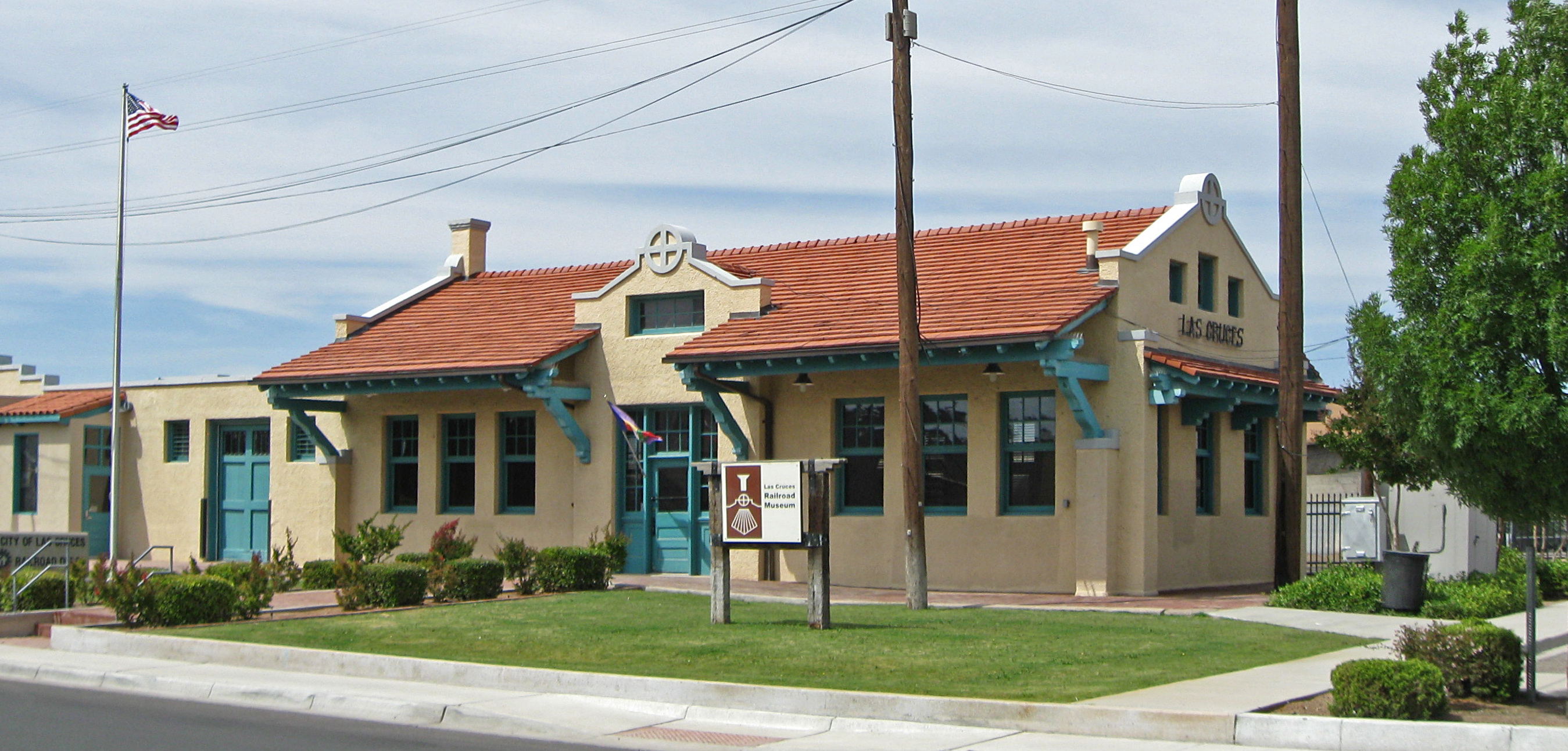
Las Cruces Railroad Museum

Las Cruces is served by the BNSF Railway' El Paso Subdivision, which provides freight service and extends from Belen, New Mexico to El Paso, Texas. Passenger service on this line was discontinued in 1968, due to low ridership numbers on the Atchison, Topeka, and Santa Fe Railway's (predecessor to the BNSF) El Pasoan train.

==== Bus transit ====
The city operates a small transit authority known as RoadRUNNER Transit. It operates a total of eight routes, and two Aggie routes running Mondays through Saturdays.

NMDOT Park and Ride's Gold Route connects Las Cruces to El Paso on Monday through Friday during commute hours. The Silver Route connects Las Cruces to White Sands Missile Range.

South Central Regional Transit District's Green Line connects Las Cruces to Hatch, and the Red Line connects Las Cruces to Anthony.

Ztrans connects Las Cruces with Alamogordo.

Greyhound buses departing Las Cruces serve El Paso, Amarillo, Denver, Albuquerque, Phoenix, Tucson, Los Angeles, and San Diego.

=== Utilities ===
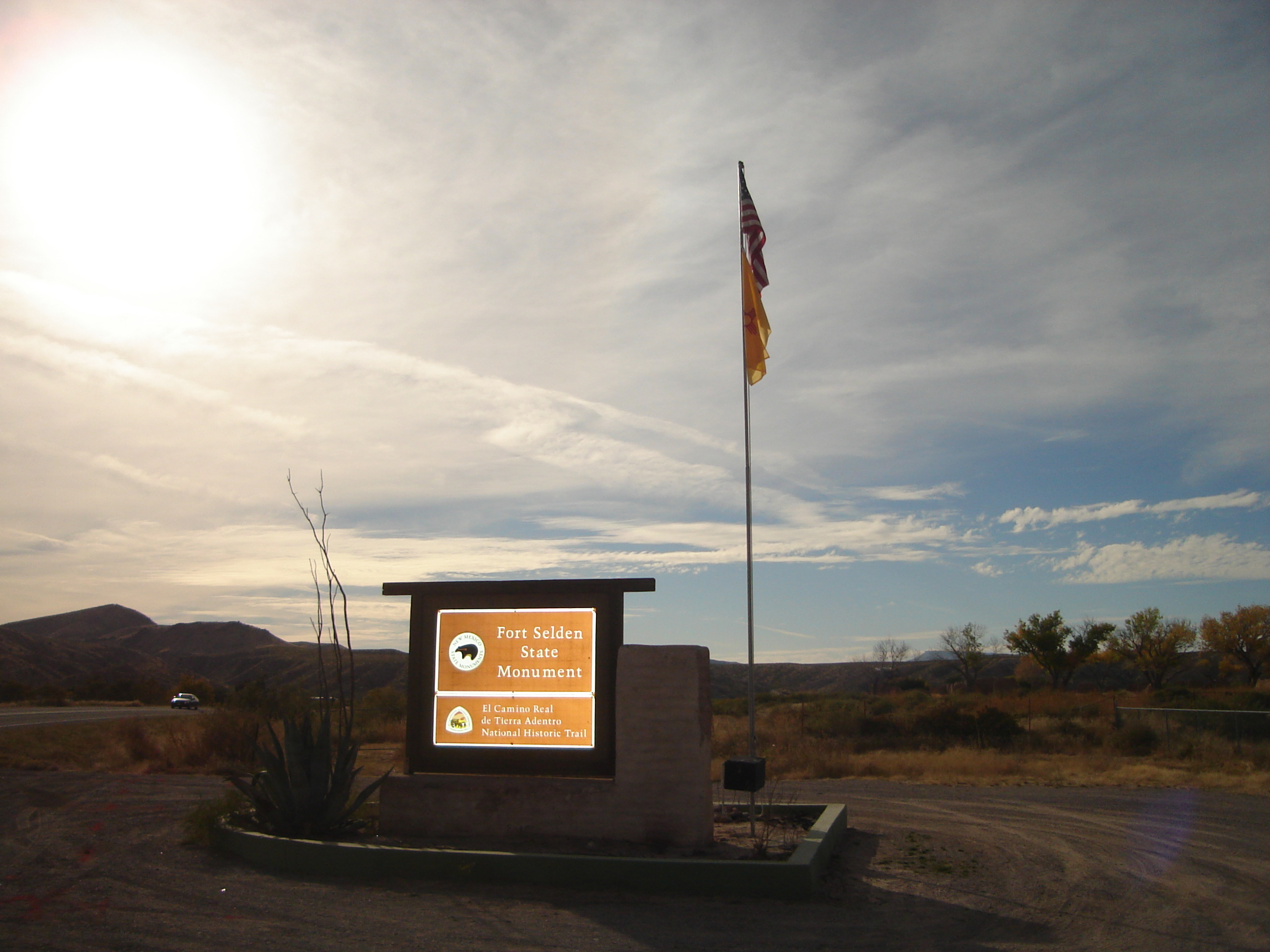
Fort Selden State Monument

The City of Las Cruces provides water, sewer, natural gas, and solid-waste services, including recycling centers. El Paso Electric is the electricity provider, CenturyLink is the telephone land line provider, and Comcast is the cable TV provider.

=== Healthcare ===
==== Hospitals ====
Memorial Medical Center is a for-profit general hospital operated by LifePoint Hospitals Inc. The physical plant is owned by the City of Las Cruces and the County of Doña Ana, which signed a 40-year, $150 million lease in 2004 with Province HealthCare, since absorbed into LifePoint. Prior to 2004, it was leased to and operated by the nonprofit Memorial Medical Center Inc. The hospital is a licensed 286-bed acute care facility and is accredited by JCAHO. It offers a wide range of patient services. The University of New Mexico Cancer Center-South opened in 2006 on the MMC campus. It is 5,300 square feet (490 m^{2}) and has 9 examination rooms. The original facility was called Memorial General Hospital and was opened in April 1950 at South Alameda Boulevard and Lohman Avenue after the city obtained a $250,000 federal grant. In 1971, the city and county joined to build a new hospital on South Telshor Boulevard. In 1990, it was renamed Memorial Medical Center.

MountainView Regional Medical Center is a for-profit general hospital operated by Community Health Systems (formerly Triad Hospitals). It opened for business in August 2002. It is a 168-bed facility with a wide range of patient services.

Mesilla Valley Hospital is a 125-bed private psychiatric hospital operated by Universal Health Services. It is an acute inpatient and residential facility offering a variety of treatments for behavioral health issues.

Three Crosses Regional Hospital is a 46-bed private acute care hospital developed by Goldenrod Companies and the Tetrad Property Group. The facility opened in 2020, after being delayed by the COVID-19 pandemic. The Accreditation Council for Graduate Medical Education approved accreditation for an internal medicine residency program at the hospital in 2025.

Rehabilitation Hospital of Southern New Mexico is a 40-bed rehabilitative care hospital, operated by Ernest Health Inc. It opened January 2005. It treats patients after they have been cared for at general hospitals for injuries or strokes.

Advanced Care Hospital of Southern New Mexico is a 20-bed long-term acute care facility operated by Ernest Health Inc. It opened in July 2007.

== Notable people ==
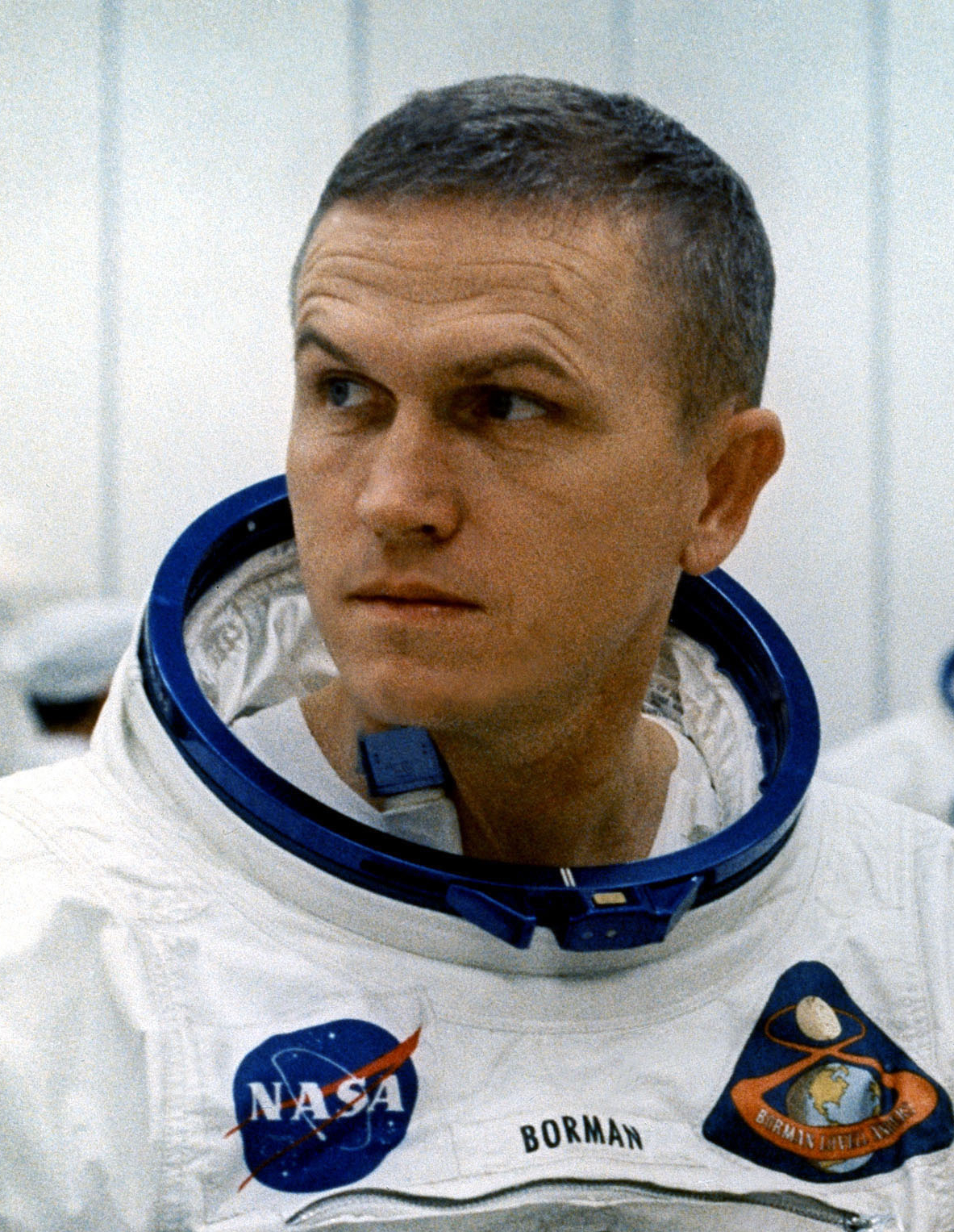
Frank Borman

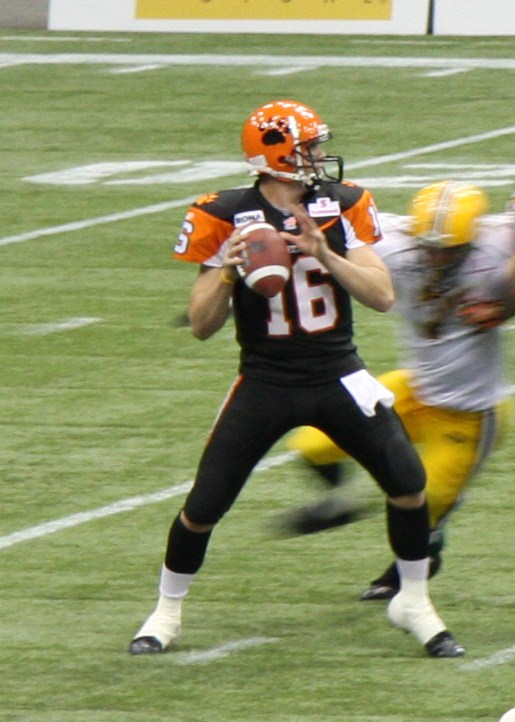
Buck Pierce

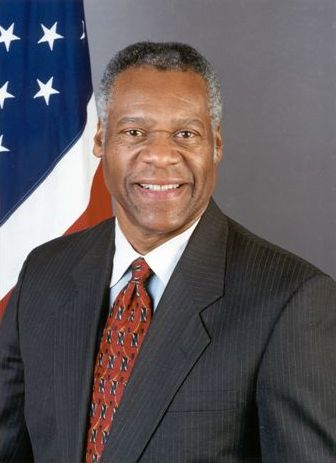
Delano Lewis

- Richard Artschwager, painter and sculptor, grew up in Las Cruces
- Anwar al-Awlaki, alleged Al-Qaeda spokesman and regional leader, was born in Las Cruces; he was killed by the U.S. government in 2011 for his alleged propaganda on behalf of Al-Qaeda in the Arabian Peninsula
- Luis Barraza, soccer player
- Barnard Elliott Bee Jr., a career U.S. Army officer and a Confederate States Army general during the American Civil War, spent six years in Las Cruces prior to the war.
- Rich Beem, professional golfer; played high school and college golf at Las Cruces High School and NMSU; winner of the 2002 PGA Championship
- Joseph Benavidez, Mexican-American mixed martial arts fighter
- Baxter Black, cowboy, poet, philosopher, former large-animal veterinarian, and radio commentator; raised in Las Cruces and attended NMSU
- Frank Borman, NASA astronaut and engineer, had a home and auto dealership in Las Cruces. He is known for Gemini VII, a nearly 14-day, low-Earth-orbital mission (1965) and Apollo 8, the first humans to leave low-Earth orbit, reach and orbit the Moon, and return safely (1968).
- William Bowers, Oscar-nominated screenwriter; born in Las Cruces
- Randy Brown, professional basketball player for the Chicago Bulls; previously played at NMSU
- Pamela Burford, novelist; born in Las Cruces
- Edgar Castillo, soccer player who represented the Mexico and United States national teams
- Denise Chávez, author, playwright, and stage director
- Steve Colter, professional basketball player in the NBA; played at NMSU
- John A.D. Cooper, physician and educator, and first president of the Association of American Medical Colleges, grew up in Las Cruces.
- Sharon Douglas, actress, attended Las Cruces Union High School
- Doug Eddings, Major League Baseball umpire; resident
- Albert Fall, U.S. senator from New Mexico and U.S. Secretary of the Interior
- Richard Farrer, South African–American soccer player; raised in Las Cruces
- Albert Jennings Fountain, a lawyer, Indian fighter, and Republican politician in Texas and New Mexico, whose disappearance remains a mystery
- Chuck Franco, first gentleman of New Mexico
- Pat Garrett, Old West lawman who killed Billy the Kid
- Mimi Reisel Gladstein, professor of English and Theatre Arts at the University of Texas at El Paso
- Lou Henson, basketball coach
- Po James, professional football player; running back for NFL's Philadelphia Eagles; played collegiately at NMSU
- Albert Johnson, first black mayor in New Mexico
- Charley Johnson, professional football player, NFL quarterback, professor of chemical engineering at his alma mater, NNMSU; resident
- Freddy Juarez, American soccer coach and former player
- Paul Wilbur Klipsch, engineer and high-fidelity audio pioneer, is known for developing the high-efficiency, folded-horn loudspeaker; graduate of NMSU
- Timothy Kraft, a political consultant and the 1980 presidential campaign manager for Jimmy Carter; retired in Las Cruces
- Kiki Lara, soccer player; born in Las Cruces
- Delano Lewis, former U.S. ambassador to South Africa and president and CEO of National Public Radio; resident
- Kerry Locklin, NFL football coach
- Mireille Marokvia, French writer best known for two books about her ordeals during World War II in Nazi Germany, resident later in life until her death in 2008
- Mark Medoff, Tony Award-winning playwright of Children of a Lesser God
- Susan Louise O'Connor, actress; born in Las Cruces
- Rose Marie Pangborn, scientist and pioneer in the sensory analysis of food; born in Las Cruces
- J. R. Patton, racing driver; born in Las Cruces
- Bertha M. Paxton, first woman elected to the New Mexico Legislature
- Lenny Pickett, saxophonist and musical director of the Saturday Night Live band; born in Las Cruces
- Buck Pierce, professional Canadian football quarterback who played for NNSU, resident during the off-season
- Bashir Ramzy, a long jumper in track and field, won a bronze medal in the 2007 Pan American Games; born in Las Cruces
- Patricia Ryan, writer of romance, mystery and erotic novels; born in Las Cruces
- Mai Shanley, Miss USA 1984
- Tom Smith, playwright and director, teaches at NMSU; resident
- Clyde Tombaugh, astronomer who discovered Pluto; resident
- Xochitl Torres Small, congressional representative from New Mexico and United States Deputy Secretary of Agriculture
- Austin Trout, a former WBA light-middleweight champion of the world; born in and fights from Las Cruces
- Gabe Vasquez, United States Representative from New Mexico, former Las Cruces City Councilor
- Prentiss Walker, member of the United States House of Representatives from Mississippi, spent part of his childhood in Las Cruces
- Cora Witherspoon, stage and screen character actress; resident
- Fredd Young, professional football player (NFL's Seattle Seahawks and Indianapolis Colts); played for NMSU, resident

== See also ==
- Las Cruces Police Department

== Sister cities ==
Las Cruces has two sister cities, as designated by Sister Cities International:

- Ciudad Lerdo, Durango, Mexico
- Nienburg, Lower Saxony, Germany

Las Cruces Sister Cities Foundation is responsible for overseeing sister cities activities on behalf of the citizens of Las Cruces. The Foundation was created in 1989 to officially recognize a relationship that began in 1982 with exchanges between Doña Ana Community College and the Centro de Bachilleratio Technológico Industrial y de Servicios Numero 4 of Lerdo, Durango, Mexico. On July 4, 1993, a second partnership was established with Nienburg, Lower Saxony, Germany, which grew from a school exchange between Mayfield High School and Albert Schweitzer School which was managed for the Las Cruces students by Mayfield German Language teacher Ingrid Luchini.
