= List of high schools in New Mexico =

This is a list of high schools in the state of New Mexico.

== Bernalillo County ==
- East Mountain High School, Sandia Park
- To'Hajilee High School, Canoncito

=== Albuquerque ===
==== Public/magnet schools ====
- Albuquerque High School
- Atrisco Heritage Academy
- Career Enrichment Center/Early College Academy
- Cibola High School
- College & Career High School
- Del Norte High School
- Eldorado High School
- Freedom High School
- Highland High School
- La Cueva High School
- Manzano High School
- Nex+Gen Academy
- Rio Grande High School
- Sandia High School
- School on Wheels Magnet School
- Valley High School
- Volcano Vista High School
- West Mesa High School

==== Charter schools ====
- ABQ Charter Academy
- ACE Leadership High School
- Albuquerque Talent Development Academy
- Albuquerque Institute for Mathematics and Science
- Amy Biehl High School
- Corrales International School
- Cottonwood Classical Preparatory School
- Digital Arts & Technology Academy (DATA)
- eCADEMY Alternative School
- El Camino Real Academy
- Health Leadership High School
- La Academia de Esperanza Charter School
- Los Puentes Charter School
- Mark Armijo Charter Academy
- Native American Community Academy
- New Mexico Academy for the Media Arts
- Northpoint Charter School
- Public Academy for Performing Arts
- Robert F. Kennedy High School
- South Valley Academy
- Technology Leadership High School

==== Private schools ====
- Albuquerque Academy
- Bosque School
- Designs for Learning Differences (DLD) Sycamore School
- Hope Christian School
- Menaul School
- St. Pius X High School
- Sandia Preparatory School

== Catron County ==
- Quemado Elementary and High School, Quemado
- Reserve High School, Reserve

== Chaves County ==
- Dexter High School, Dexter
- Early College High School, Roswell
- Gateway Christian School, Roswell
- Goddard High School, Roswell
- Hagerman High School, Hagerman
- Lake Arthur High School, Lake Arthur
- New Mexico Military Institute, Roswell
- Roswell High School, Roswell
- University High School, Roswell
- Valley Christian Academy, Roswell

== Cibola County ==
- Grants High School, Grants
- Laguna Acoma Middle/High School, New Laguna
- Pine Hill High School, Pine Hill

== Colfax County ==
- Cimarron High School, Cimarron
- Maxwell High School, Maxwell
- Moreno Valley Preparatory, Angel Fire
- Raton High School, Raton
- Springer High School, Springer

== Curry County ==
- Clovis Christian School, Clovis
- Clovis High School, Clovis
- Grady High School, Grady
- Melrose High School, Melrose
- Texico High School, Texico

== De Baca County ==
- Fort Sumner High School, Fort Sumner

== Doña Ana County ==
- Alta Vista Early College High School, Las Cruces/University Park
- Arrowhead Park Early College High School and Medical Academy, Las Cruces
- Centennial High School, Las Cruces
- Chaparral High School, Chaparral
- Desert Pride Academy, Anthony
- Gadsden High School, Anthony
- Hatch Valley High School, Hatch
- Las Cruces High School, Las Cruces
- Las Montanas High School, Las Cruces
- Mayfield High School, Las Cruces
- Mesilla Valley Vocational Training High School, Las Cruces
- Mesilla Valley Christian School, Las Cruces
- Organ Mountain High School (formerly Oñate High School), Las Cruces
- Rio Grande Preparatory Institute, Mesilla
- San Andres High School, Mesilla
- Santa Teresa High School, Santa Teresa

== Eddy County ==
- Artesia High School, Artesia
- Carlsbad Early College High School, Carlsbad
- Carlsbad High School, Carlsbad
- Jefferson Montessori Academy, Carlsbad
- Loving High School, Loving

== Grant County ==
- Cliff High School, Cliff
- Cobre High School, Bayard
- Silver High School, Silver City, Silver City
- Aldo Leopold Middle & High Charter School, Silver City

== Guadalupe County ==
- Santa Rosa High School, Santa Rosa
- Vaughn High School, Vaughn

== Harding County ==
- Mosquero High School, Mosquero
- Roy High School, Roy

== Hidalgo County ==
- Animas High School, Animas
- Lordsburg High School, Lordsburg

== Lea County ==
- Eunice High School, Eunice
- Hobbs High School, Hobbs
- Jal High School, Jal
- Lovington High School, Lovington
- New Hope High School, Lovington
- Tatum High School, Tatum

== Lincoln County ==
- Capitan High School, Capitan
- Carrizozo High School, Carrizozo
- Corona High School, Corona
- Gavilan Canyon Alternative, Ruidoso
- Hondo High School, Hondo
- Sierra Blanca Christian Academy, Ruidoso
- Ruidoso High School, Ruidoso

== Los Alamos County ==
- Los Alamos High School, Los Alamos

== Luna County ==
- Deming Cesar Chavez Charter High School, Deming
- Deming High School, Deming
- Early College High School, Deming
- Mimbres Valley High School, Deming

== McKinley County ==
- Crownpoint High School, Crownpoint
- Gallup Catholic High School, Gallup
- Gallup High School, Gallup
- Middle College Charter High School, Gallup
- Miyamura High School, Gallup
- Navajo Pine High School, Navajo
- Ramah Middle/High School, Ramah
- Rehoboth Christian School, Rehoboth
- Thoreau High School, Thoreau
- Tohatchi High School, Tohatchi
- Tsé Yí Gai High School, Pueblo Pintado
- Twin Buttes High School, Zuni
- Wingate High School, Fort Wingate
- Zuni High School, Zuni

== Mora County ==
- Mora High School, Mora
- Wagon Mound High School, Wagon Mound

== Otero County ==
- Alamogordo High School, Alamogordo
- Cloudcroft High School, Cloudcroft
- Mescalero Apache High School, Mescalero
- Tularosa High School, Tularosa

== Quay County ==
- House High School, House
- Logan High School, Logan
- San Jon High School, San Jon
- Tucumcari High School, Tucumcari

== Rio Arriba County ==
- Coronado High School, Gallina
- Dulce High School, Dulce
- Escalante Middle/High School, Tierra Amarilla
- Española Military Academy, Española
- Española Valley High School, Española
- McCurdy Charter School, Española

== Roosevelt County ==
- Dora High School, Dora
- Elida High School, Elida
- Floyd High School, Floyd
- Portales High School, Portales

== San Juan County ==
- Aztec High School, Aztec
- Bloomfield High School, Bloomfield
- Career Prep High School, Shiprock
- Farmington High School, Farmington
- Kirtland Central High School, Kirtland
- Navajo Preparatory School, Farmington
- Newcomb High School, Newcomb
- Piedra Vista High School, Farmington
- Rocinante High School, Farmington
- Shiprock High School, Shiprock
- San Juan College High School, Farmington
- Shiprock Northwest High School, Shiprock

== San Miguel County ==
- Armand Hammer United World College of the American West, Montezuma
- Las Vegas Christian Academy, Las Vegas
- Pecos Middle/High School, Pecos
- Robertson High School, Las Vegas
- West Las Vegas High School, Las Vegas

Former

- Native American Prep School, Rowe

== Sandoval County ==
- Bernalillo High School, Bernalillo
- Cuba High School, Cuba
- Independence High School, Rio Rancho
- Jemez Valley High School, Jemez Pueblo
- Rio Rancho High School, Rio Rancho
- Sandia View Academy, Corrales
- V. Sue Cleveland High School, Rio Rancho (2009)

== Santa Fe County ==
- Pojoaque Valley High School, Pojoaque

=== Santa Fe ===
- Academy for Technology and the Classics
- Capital High School
- Desert Sage Academy
- Early College Opportunities
- Mandela International Magnet School
- Monte del Sol Charter School
- St. Michael's High School
- Santa Fe High School
- Santa Fe Indian School
- Santa Fe Preparatory School
- Tierra Encantada Charter School

== Sierra County ==
- Hot Springs High School, Truth or Consequences

== Socorro County ==
- AIM High, Socorro
- Alamo Navajo High School, Alamo
- Magdalena High School, Magdalena
- Socorro High School, Socorro

== Taos County ==
- Chamisa Mesa High School, Ranchos de Taos (closed)
- Mesa Vista High School, Ojo Caliente
- Peñasco Middle/High School, Peñasco
- Questa Junior/Senior High School, Questa
- Taos High School, Taos

== Torrance County ==
- Estancia High School, Estancia
- Moriarty High School, Moriarty
- Mountainair High School, Mountainair

== Union County ==
- Clayton High School, Clayton
- Des Moines High School, Des Moines

== Valencia County ==
- Belen High School, Belen
- Century High School, Los Lunas
- Los Lunas High School, Los Lunas
- School of Dreams Academy, Los Lunas
- Valencia High School, Los Lunas

== See also ==
- List of school districts in New Mexico
