= Aggie Memorial Stadium =

New Mexico stadium

Joey Mullen Field at Aggie Memorial Stadium
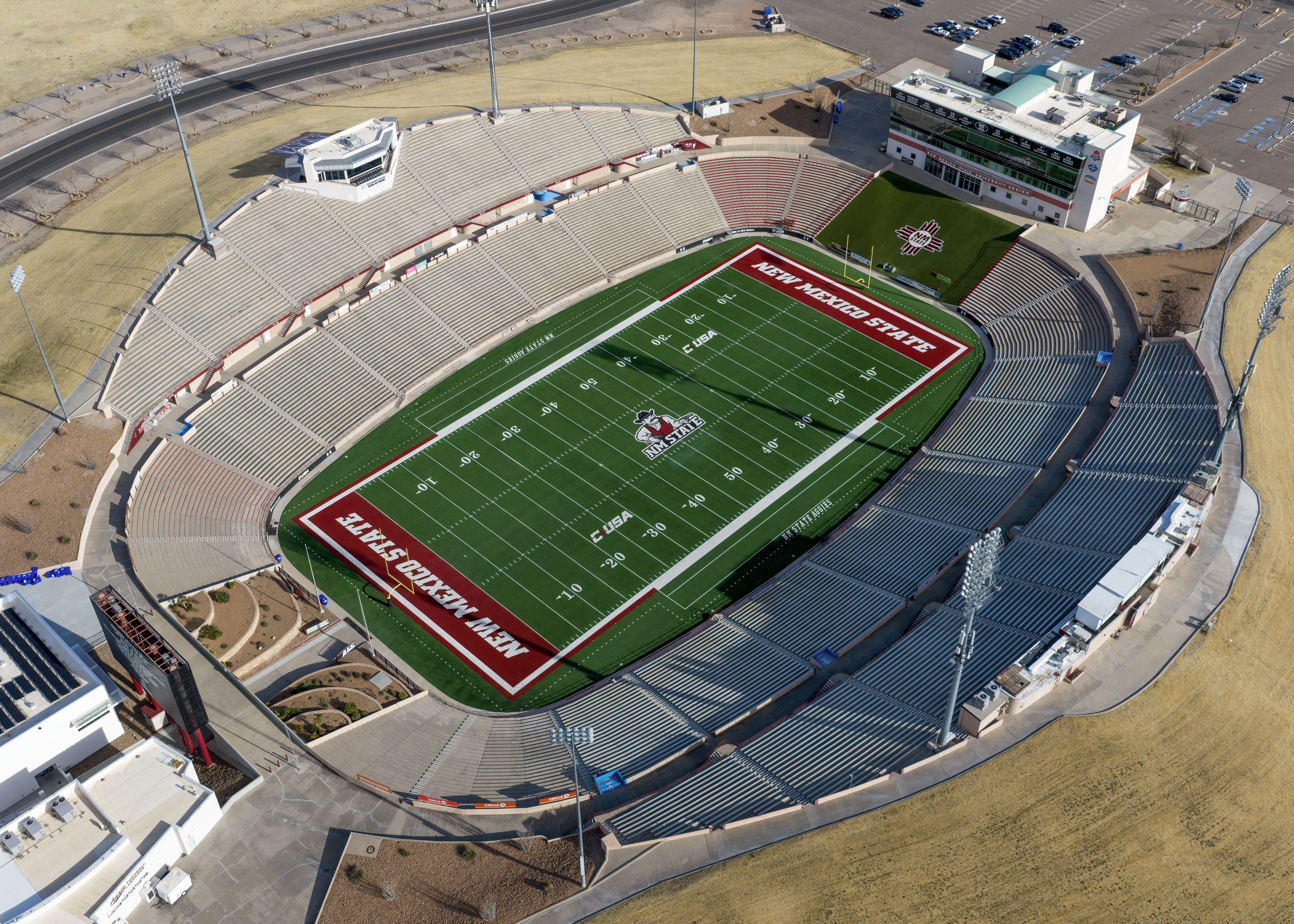
- View from northwest corner in 2026

- Location within the United States Location within New Mexico
- Interactive map of Joey Mullen Field at Aggie Memorial Stadium
- Address: Stewart St & Payne St
- Location: New Mexico State University; Las Cruces, New Mexico, U.S.
- Coordinates: 32°16′47″N 106°44′28″W
- Elevation: 3,980 feet (1,215 m) AMSL
- Owner: New Mexico State University
- Operator: New Mexico State University
- Capacity: 28,853 (2015–present); 30,343 (1978–2014)
- Surface: Artificial turf (2014–present); Hybrid Bermuda grass (1978–2013)
- Record attendance: 32,993 (vs. UTEP, 1998)

Construction
- Groundbreaking: March 1977; 49 years ago
- Opened: September 16, 1978; 48 years ago
- Cost: $4 million ($19.7 million in 2025)
- Architects: Craig Protz of Bohening-Protz Associates; Caudill Rowlett Scott of Houston, Consultants

Tenants
- New Mexico State Aggies (NCAA); Football (1978–present); Women's soccer (2009–2011); Las Cruces HS–Mayfield HS derby (1978-present); Organ Mountain HS–Centennial HS derby (2017–present)

Aggie Memorial Stadium is an outdoor football stadium in the southwestern United States, located on the campus of New Mexico State University in Las Cruces, New Mexico. It is the home field of the New Mexico State Aggies of Conference USA.

Opened 48 years ago in 1978, the current seating capacity is 28,853. Its artificial turf playing field is aligned north-northwest to south-southeast at an elevation of 3,980 feet (1,215 m) above sea level. It is the former home of Aggies women's soccer.

== Prior to 1978 ==
The original football field for New Mexico A&M was located just northwest of the Horseshoe at Espina Street and College Drive, on the site now occupied by Skeen Hall. Known as Miller Field, its entrance gates, constructed in 1924, still stand on a traffic island in front of Skeen Hall's main entrance. In 1933. Aggie football moved to a new field located just to the northeast of Hadley Hall (the university's Administration building), originally known as Quesenberry Field. The original Memorial Stadium was built at the same site in 1950. It was dedicated as a memorial to New Mexico A&M students who had died in World War II, World War I, and the Spanish–American War, among whom was Henry C. Gilbert Jr., whose parents were instrumental in the 10-year-long fundraising drive.

Memorial Stadium, which served for 28 seasons, was replaced both due to its small size (maximum seating capacity of 12,155) and the want of an expanded athletics plant with more infrastructure and parking. (Currently Memorial Tower, which was originally part of the press box of the stadium, is the only remaining reminder of the stadium. It is now structurally incorporated into the university's Health and Social Services building and houses a memorial lounge and computer lab.)

== The "New" stadium ==
The "new" Aggie Memorial Stadium, dedicated to alumni who had served in the Korean War and Vietnam War, was built for $4 million over a period of 18 months. It was funded by the state legislature as part of a capital project on the campus.

Its inaugural game in 1978 saw the Aggies defeat nearby rival Texas–El Paso (UTEP) 35–32 on September 16. Twenty years (and ten days) later, the Aggies and UTEP Miners played to the largest attendance (32,993) in stadium history, as the Aggies won again, 33–24.

For its first 36 seasons, the playing field was natural grass; UBU Sports Speed S5-M synthetic turf was installed prior to the 2014 season.

== Stadium design ==
Designed by alumnus Craig Protz of Bohering-Protz Associates, the stadium was built just to the south of the Pan American Center, the home of Aggie basketball. It boasts a unique design in which earth that was excavated to construct the lower bowl and field level was moved to the sides of the stadium to support the upper level, with a street level concourse dividing the lower and upper bowls.

The first level of seating wraps around the field, except for two 100-foot-wide (30 m) gaps behind each end zone. The southern end is a grass berm, with the Fulton Athletics Center, a $6 million structure constructed in 2004 housing athletics offices, an athletic training and education center, and club facilities, behind it. The northern end leads to the locker room facilities and main entrance to the stadium.

Because of these gaps it was previously impossible to access the east side of the stadium from the west, and vice versa, without exiting the stadium and re-entering on the other side. A bridge over the north ramp constructed prior to the 2006 season now allows fans to cross from one side of the stadium to the other. The seating extends to a rounded second level on either side of the field, which extends the length of the playing field. The curved, undulating design of the upper level is reminiscent of similarly designed structures such as Memphis' Liberty Bowl Stadium and the now-demolished Tampa Stadium, albeit on a somewhat smaller scale.

== Improvements ==
The original four pole sodium vapor lighting system is now augmented by four additional smaller poles added prior to the 2005 season to increase the stadium's lighting capacity for televised night games. A $1.5 million scoreboard, including a 38-by-23-foot (11.6 m × 7.0 m) video screen, was added in 2007, as well as a new team meeting and video room complex adjacent to the field house on the stadium's north end. A club level area called Club 27 was added in 2015, which reduced the stadium's total capacity to 28,853, but added 92 club level seats at the cost of $1.1 million.

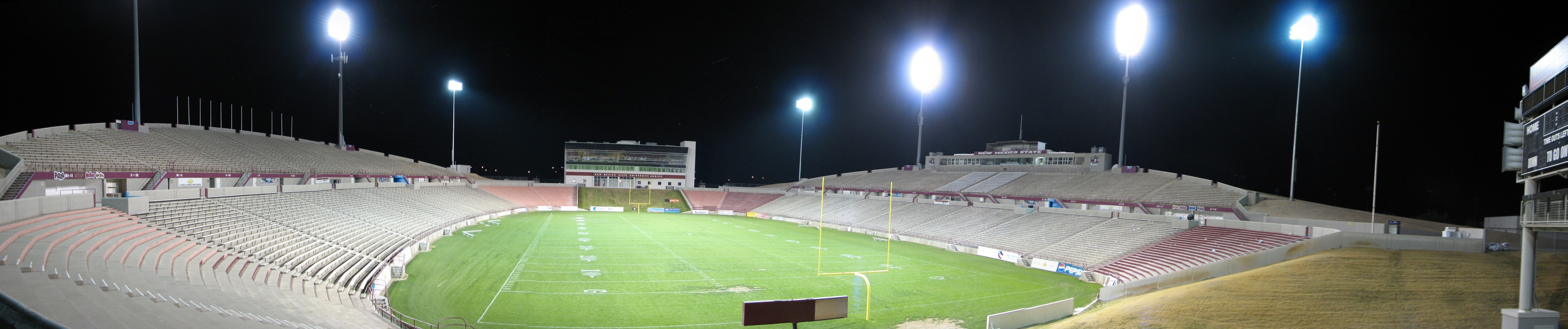
Aggie Memorial Stadium in 2006

== Attendance records ==
Rank	Attendance	Date	Game Result
1	32,993	September 26, 1998	New Mexico State 33, UTEP 24
2	32,904	September 13, 1986	UTEP 47, New Mexico State 33
3	31,839	September 18, 1993	New Mexico State 31, UTEP 14
4	31,214	September 24, 2004	New Mexico 38, New Mexico State 3
5	30,605	October 5, 2002	New Mexico State 49, UTEP 14
6	30,343	September 27, 2008	New Mexico 35, New Mexico State 24
6	30,343	September 15, 2007	New Mexico State 29, UTEP 24
6	30,343	September 3, 2005	UTEP 34, New Mexico State 17
9	30,341	September 14, 1991	UTEP 22, New Mexico State 21
10	30,193	September 16, 1978	New Mexico State 35, UTEP 32
11	30,061	October 29, 1988	UTEP 42, New Mexico State 9
12	29,921	September 2, 1995	New Mexico State 45, UTEP 17
13	29,095	September 9, 2006	New Mexico 34, New Mexico State 28
14	28,587	November 21, 2002	New Mexico State 24, New Mexico 13
15	27,646	September 12, 1992	New Mexico State 42, New Mexico 39
16	27,306	September 4, 1982	UTEP 20, New Mexico State 17
17	27,238	September 8, 2001	Oregon State 27, New Mexico State 22
18	27,201	September 12, 2015	Georgia State 34, New Mexico State 32
19	26,528	October 22, 1994	New Mexico 56, New Mexico State 31
20	26,271	September 29, 1979	New Mexico 30, New Mexico State 16

== Other uses ==
In addition to football, the stadium occasionally hosts major concerts and other large outdoor gatherings on campus.

=== Concerts ===
Artists that have performed at the stadium include Metallica, Guns N' Roses, Faith No More, The Eagles, Vans Warped Tour & Paul McCartney, among others.

Date	Artist	Opening act(s)	Tour / Concert name	Attendance	Revenue	Notes
August 27, 1992	Guns N' Roses; Metallica	Faith No More	Guns N' Roses/Metallica Stadium Tour	35,373 / 35,373	$972,758	
April 20, 1993	Paul McCartney	—	The New World Tour	30,058 / 30,058	$1,002,625	
May 3, 1995	The Eagles	—	Hell Freezes Over Tour	—	—	

=== Other events ===
During the 2005–06 renovation of the nearby Pan American Center, the stadium hosted the university's commencement ceremonies, although they returned to the Pan Am following completion of the renovations. Also, the varsity teams of Mayfield High School and Las Cruces High School play against each other in the stadium every year in November. Since November 2017, Onate High School (renamed Organ Mountain High School in 2021) and Centennial High School also play each other in the stadium.

== Gallery ==
Views around the stadium
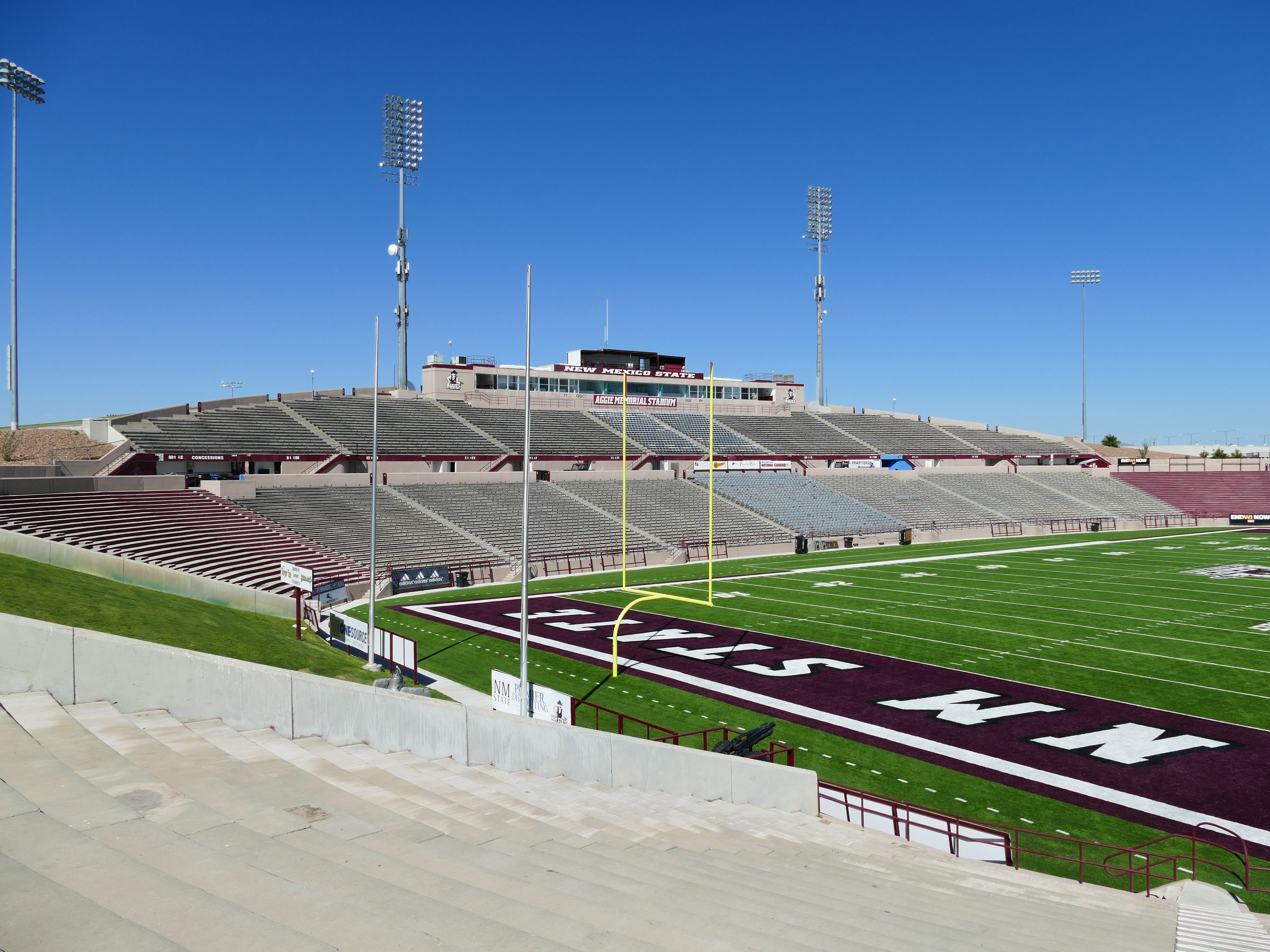
South side end zone & press box

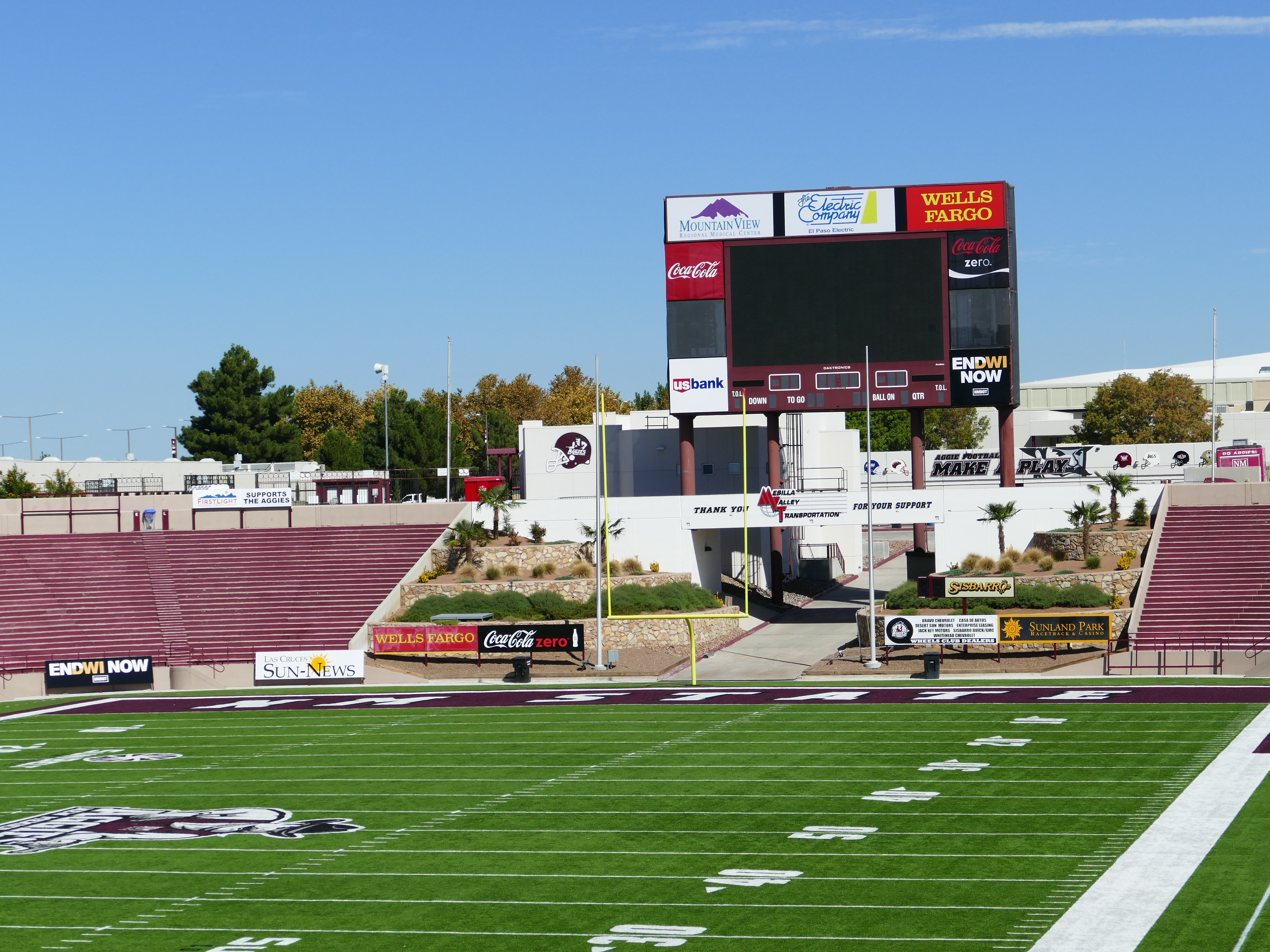
North side video board

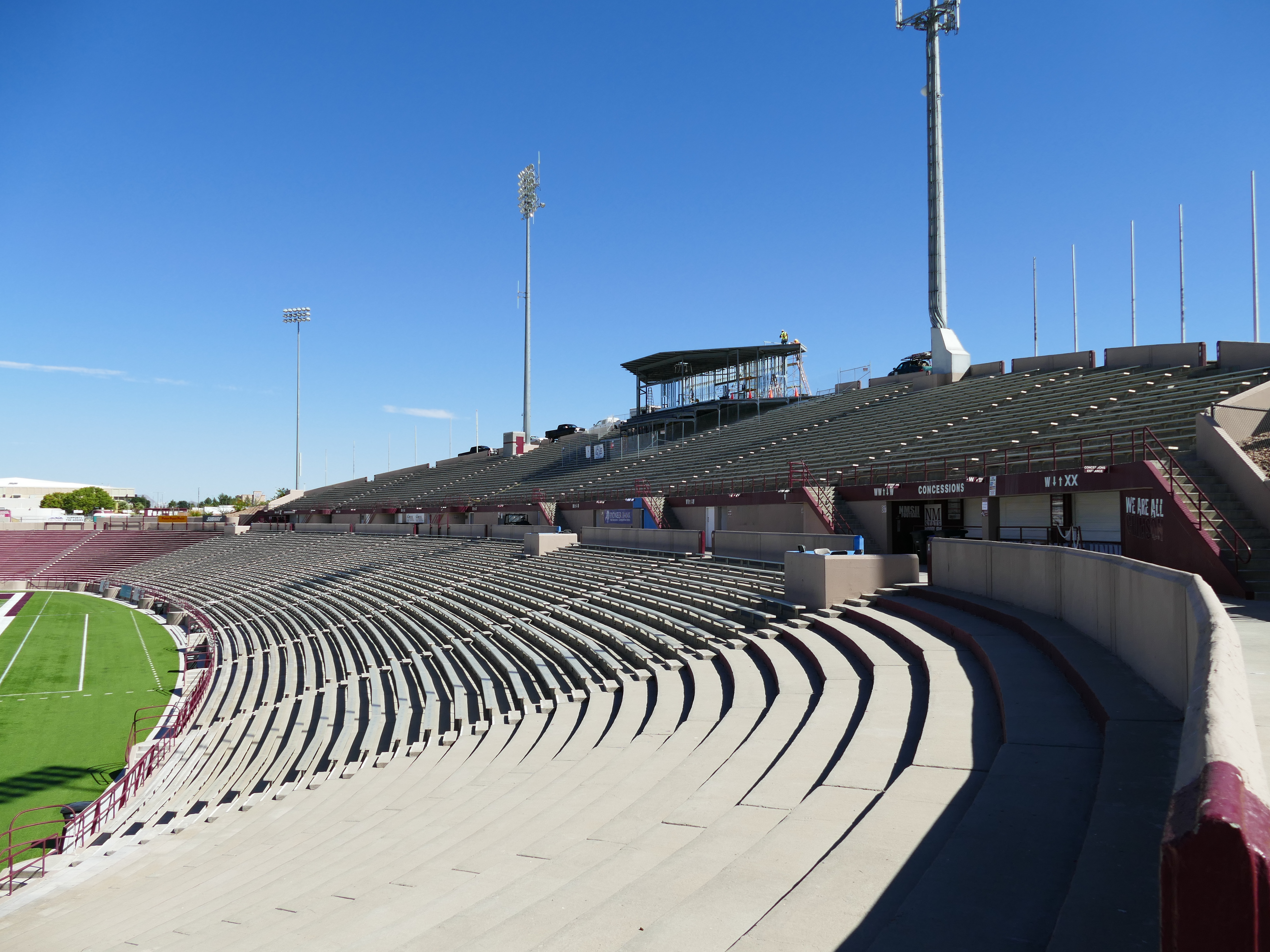
East side stands and Skybox construction

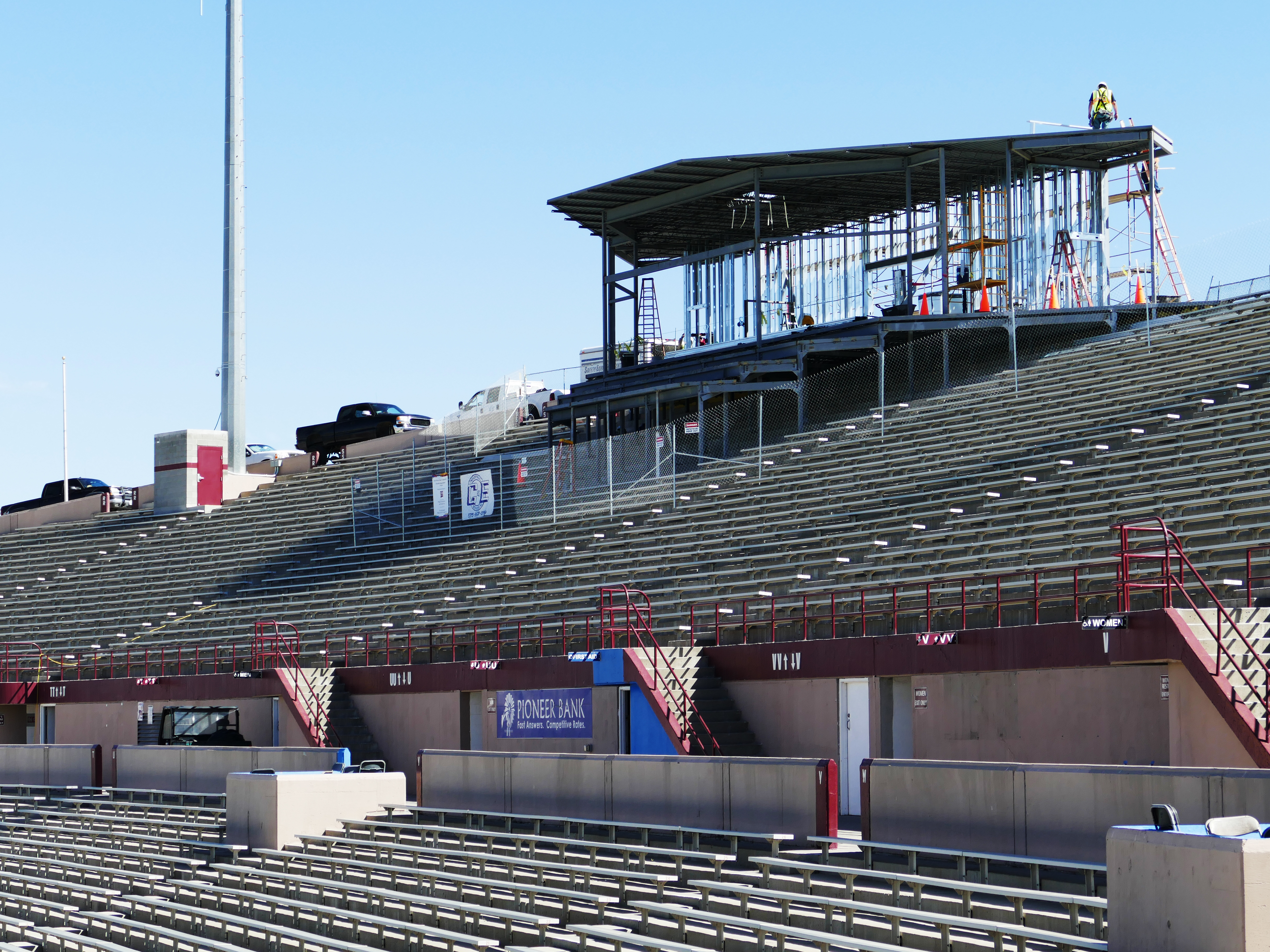
Closer view of east stand Skybox

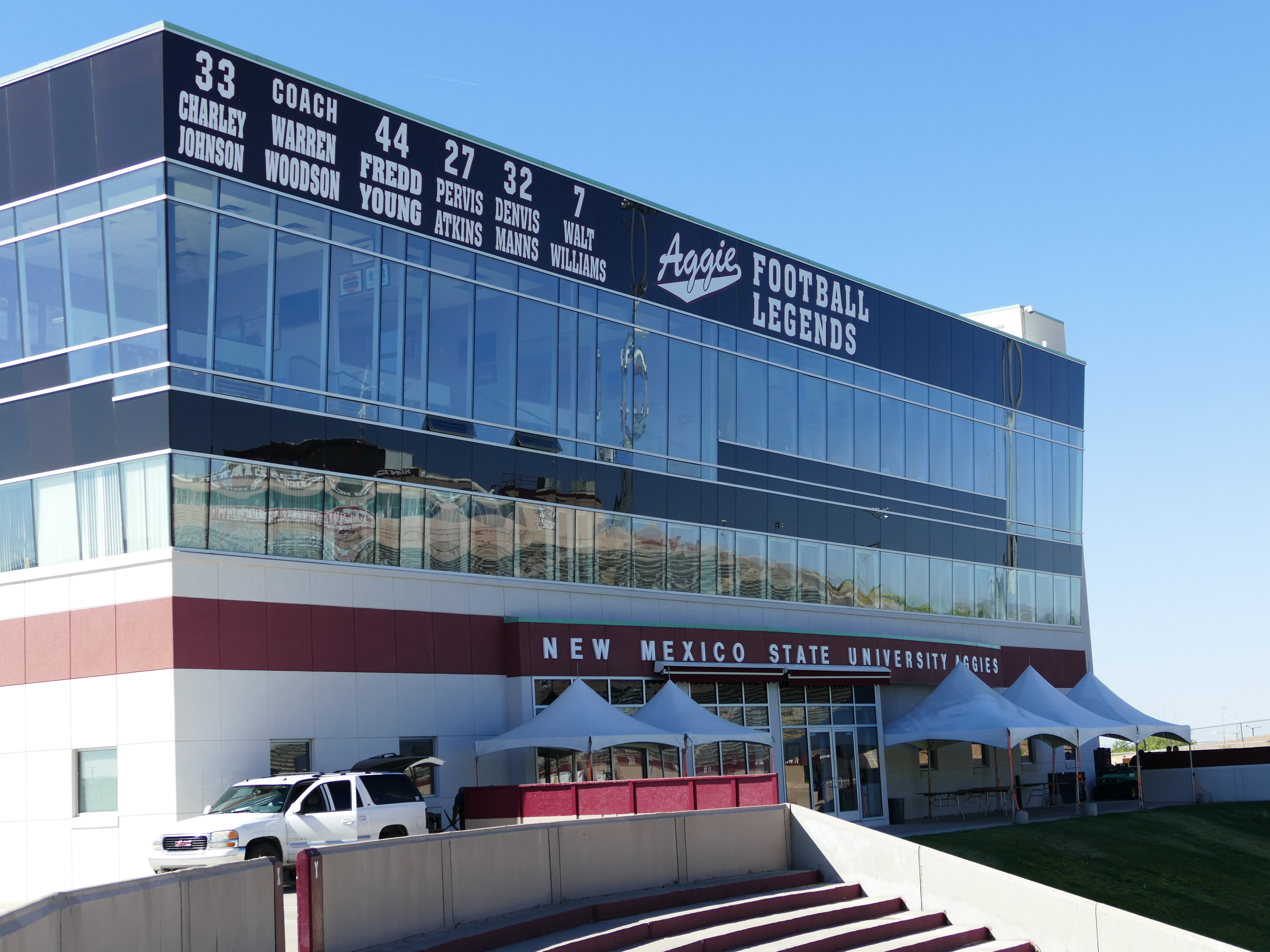
Fulton Center Skybox

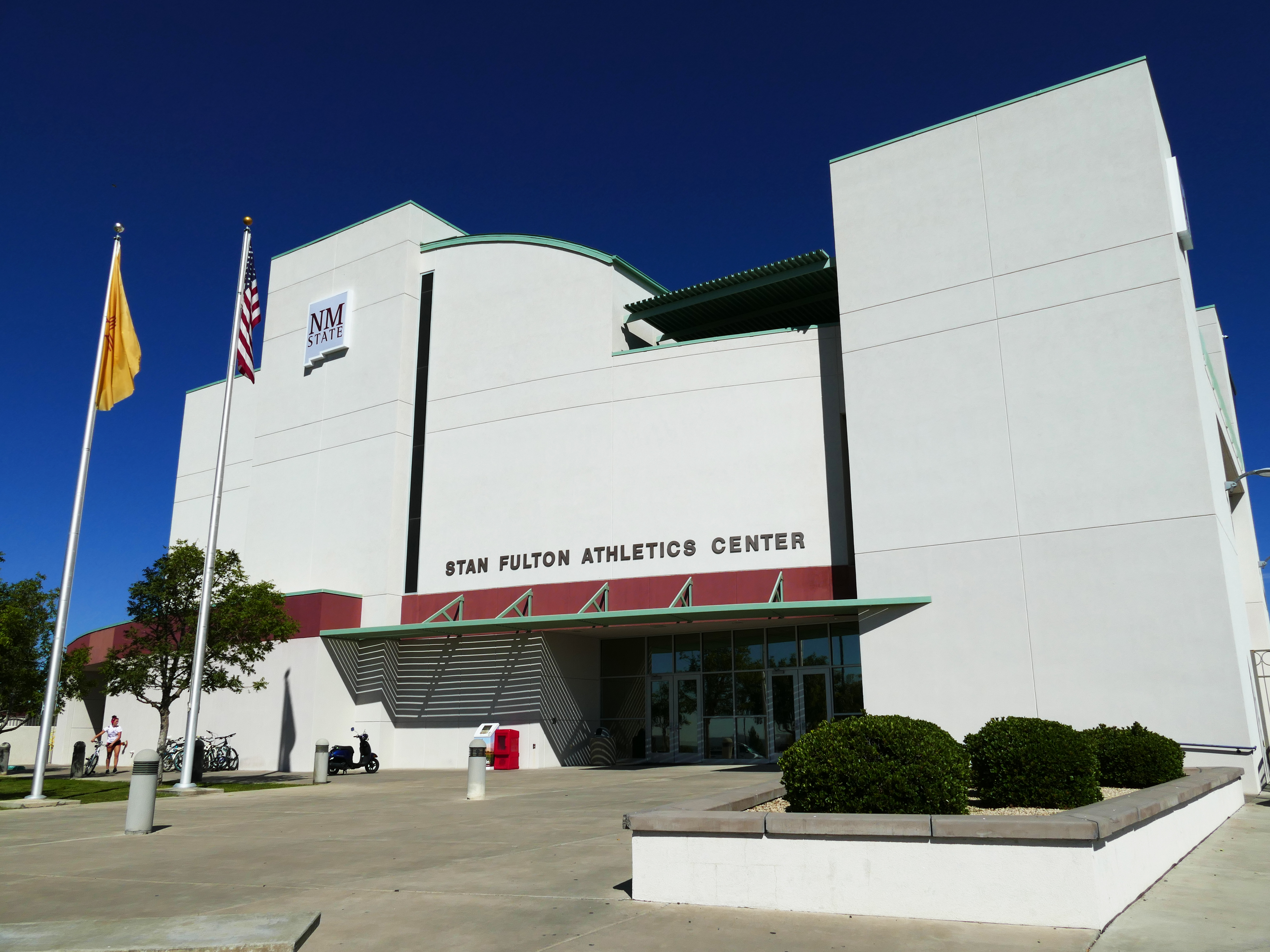
Fulton Athletics Center (Front entrance)

View from the south

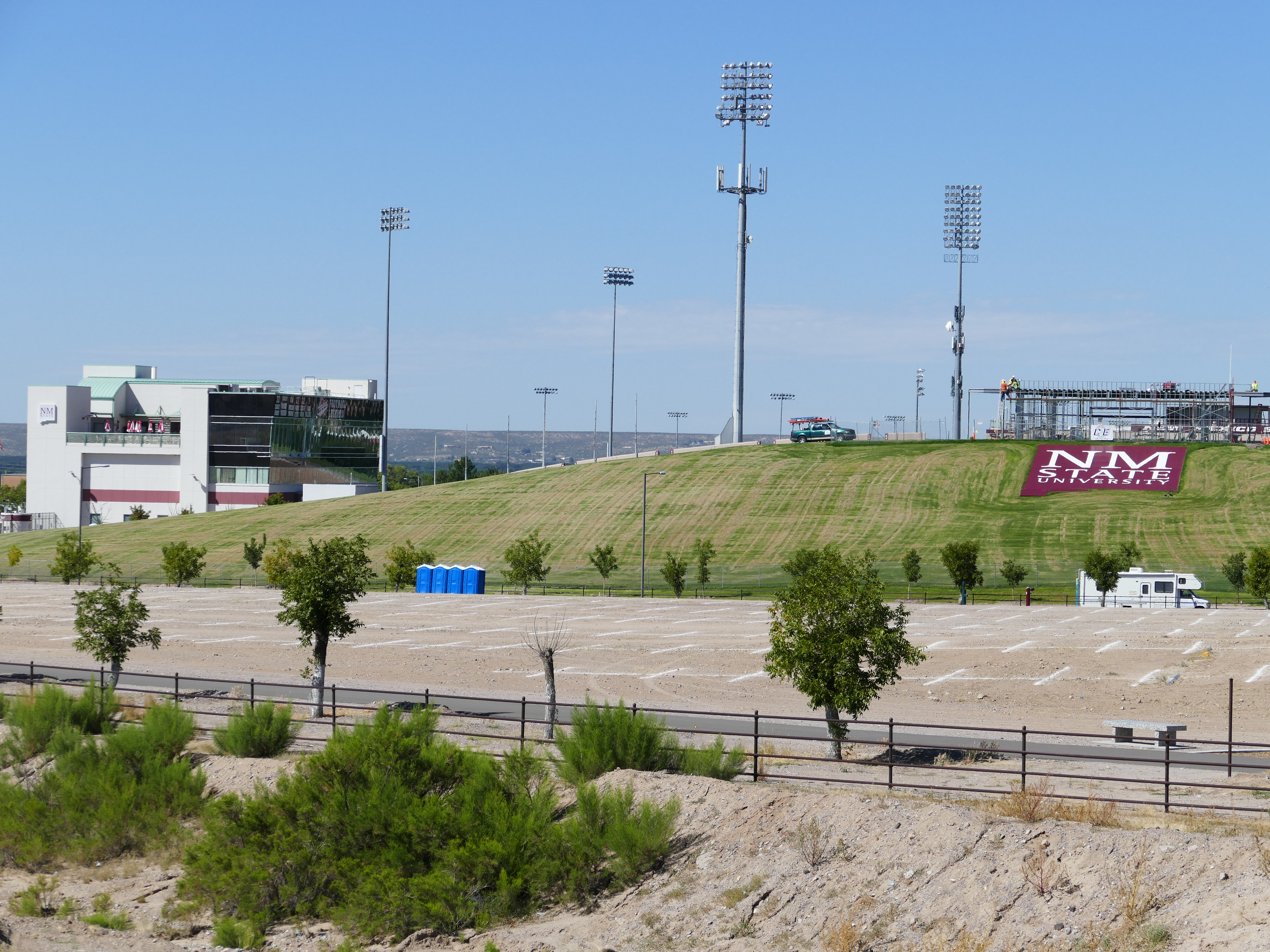
Fulton Center and east embankment

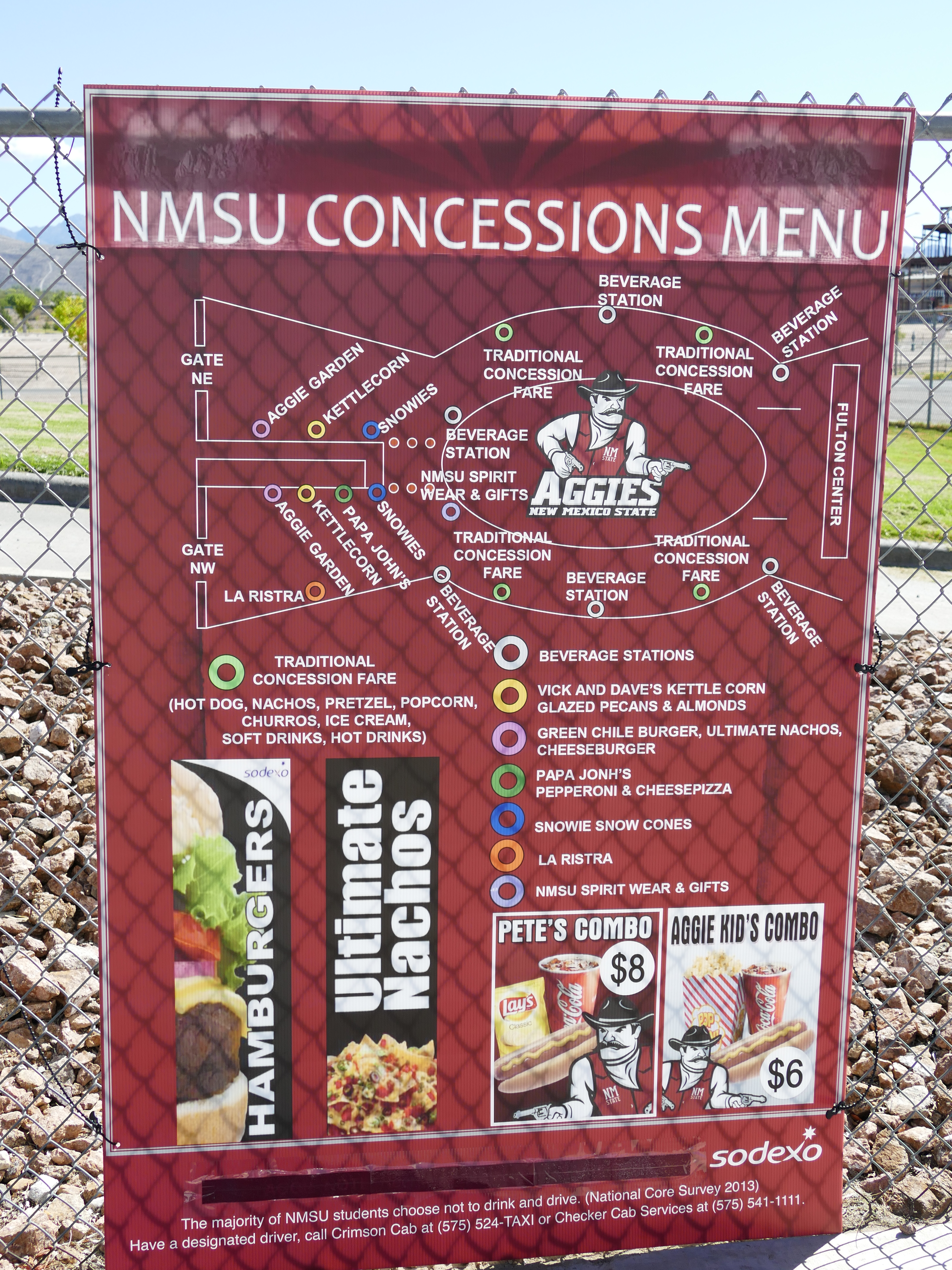
Stadium map

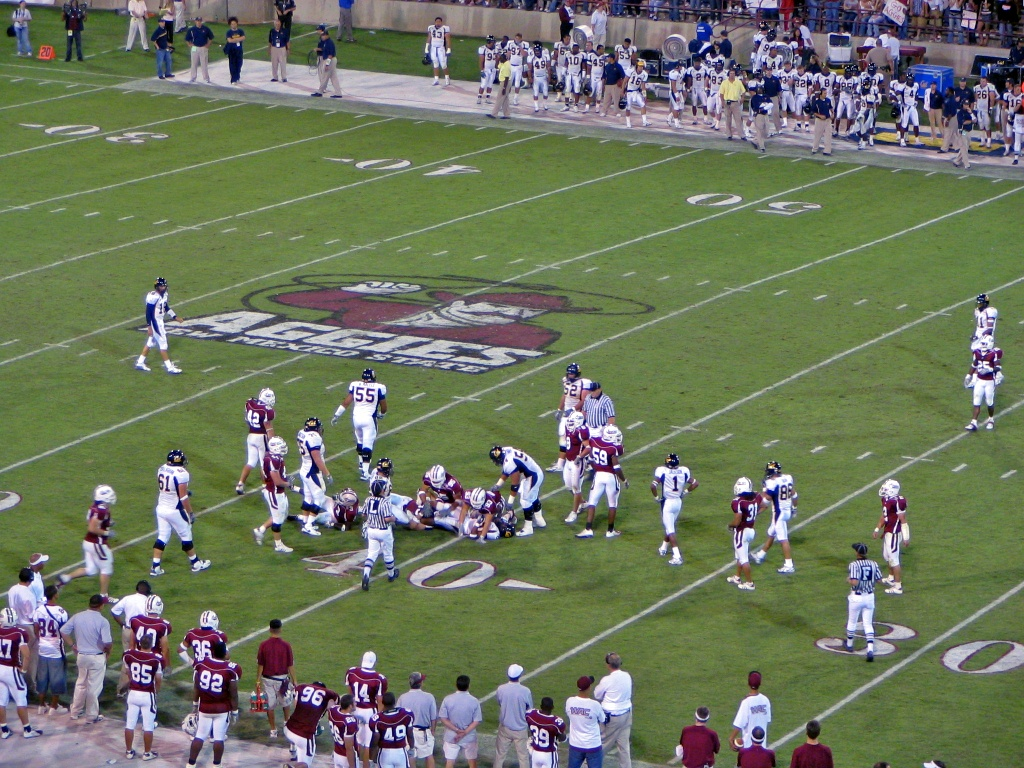
NMSU Aggies vs Cal Bears

== See also ==
- List of NCAA Division I FBS football stadiums
