= EMHS =

EMHS may refer to:

- East Meadow High School, East Meadow, New York, United States
- East Mountain High School, Sandia Park, New Mexico, United States
- Eastern Montgomery High School, Elliston, Virginia, United States
- Edmond Memorial High School, Edmond, Oklahoma, United States
- Eisenhower Middle/High School, Russell, Pennsylvania, United States
- El Modena High School, Orange County, California, United States
- El Monte High School, El Monte, California, United States
- Elkhart Memorial High School, Elkhart, Indiana, United States
- Ellender Memorial High School, Houma, Louisiana, United States
- Elmont Memorial Junior – Senior High School, Elmont, New York, United States
