= Moreno Valley High School =

Moreno Valley High School may refer to:

- Moreno Valley High School (California), Moreno Valley, California
- Moreno Valley Preparatory (formerly Moreno Valley High School) Angel Fire, New Mexico
