= Fairacres, New Mexico =

- Census-designated place
- Location within New Mexico
- Coordinates: 32°18′17″N 106°50′12″W
- Country: United States
- State: New Mexico
- County: Doña Ana

Area
  - Total: 2.11 sq mi (5.46 km^{2})
  - Land: 2.11 sq mi (5.46 km^{2})
  - Water: 0 sq mi (0.00 km^{2})
- Elevation: 3,895 ft (1,187 m)

Population (2020)
  - Total: 720
  - Density: 341.6/sq mi (131.88/km^{2})
- Time zone: UTC-7 (Mountain (MST))
  - Summer (DST): UTC-6 (MDT)
- ZIP code: 88033
- Area code: 575
- GNIS feature ID: 2584098

Fairacres is a census-designated place and unincorporated community in Doña Ana County, New Mexico, United States. As of the 2020 census, Fairacres had a population of 720. Fairacres has a post office with ZIP code 88033, which opened on June 15, 1926. U.S. Route 70 passes through the community.

== Demographics ==
Historical population
Census	Pop.	Note	%±
2020	720		—
U.S. Decennial Census

== Education ==
It is located in Las Cruces Public Schools. The district operates Fairacres Elementary School.

== Commerce ==
The Truck Farm, LLC was established here in 1996; they manufacture and ship seasonings such as Cannon's Sweet Hots and Besito Caliente.

== Notable person ==
- Barbara Funkhouser, first woman to serve as editor of the El Paso Times (1980–1986), operated the Tatreault Vineyard in Fairacres
