= McCurdy =

McCurdy may refer to:

- McCurdy (surname), includes a list of people with the name
- McCurdy Charter School, public school in Española, New Mexico, U.S.
- McCurdy Field, stadium in Frederick, Maryland, U.S.
- McCurdy Hotel, historic building in Evansville, Indiana, U.S.

== See also ==
- McCurdy's, former New York department store chain
