= Siddeeq Shabazz =

American gridiron football player (born 1981)

No. 28, 39, 26, 29, 20, 8
- Positions: Safety, linebacker

Personal information
- Born: February 5, 1981 (age 45); Frankfurt, West Germany
- Listed height: 6 ft 0 in (1.83 m)
- Listed weight: 205 lb (93 kg)

Career information
- High school: Anthony (NM) Gadsden
- College: New Mexico State
- NFL draft: 2003: 7th round, 246th overall pick

Career history
- Oakland Raiders (2003); Atlanta Falcons (2003–2004); Cincinnati Bengals (2005)*; Washington Redskins (2005)*; New Orleans Saints (2005); Miami Dolphins (2006)*; → Rhein Fire (2006); Edmonton Eskimos (2007–2008); Winnipeg Blue Bombers (2009); Las Vegas Locomotives (2010)*; Calgary Stampeders (2010)
- * Offseason or practice squad member only

Awards and highlights
- 2× First-team All-Sun Belt (2001–2002)
- Stats at Pro Football Reference
- Stats at CFL.ca (archive)

Siddeeq Muneer Shabazz (born February 5, 1981) is an American former professional football safety and linebacker who played in the National Football League (NFL) and Canadian Football League (CFL). He was selected by the Oakland Raiders in the seventh round of the 2003 NFL draft. He played college football at New Mexico State.

Shabazz was also a member of the Atlanta Falcons, Cincinnati Bengals, Washington Redskins, New Orleans Saints, Miami Dolphins, Rhein Fire, Edmonton Eskimos, Winnipeg Blue Bombers, Las Vegas Locomotives and Calgary Stampeders.

== Early life ==
Shabazz was born in Frankfurt, Germany but moved to Chaparral, New Mexico when he was four or five years old. Shabazz's parents were Muslim but Shabazz himself did not start practicing Islam until college before eventually stopping.

Shabazz attended Gadsden High School in Anthony, New Mexico.

== College career ==
Shabazz joined the New Mexico State Aggies as a running back in 1998 and redshirted that season. He then played as a defensive back from 1999 to 2002. He was a backup from 1999 to 2000. Shabazz started every game in 2001, totaling 107 tackles, two interceptions and four pass breakups, earning first-team All-Sun Belt Conference honors. He also started every game the following season in 2002, accumulating 93 tackles, one sack, two forced fumbles and two interceptions, garnering unanimous first-team All-Sun Belt recognition.

== Professional career ==
Shabazz was selected by the Oakland Raiders in the seventh round of the 2003 NFL draft. He officially signed with the team on July 25, 2003. He played in four games for the Raiders in 2003, recording one solo tackle, before being waived on September 30, 2003.

Shabazz signed with the Atlanta Falcons on October 1, 2003. He appeared in seven games for the Falcons during the 2003 season, totaling seven solo tackles and one fumble recovery. He played in 15 games in 2004, accumulating nine solo tackles and two assisted tackles. Shabazz was waived on April 25, 2005.

He was signed by the Cincinnati Bengals on April 28, 2005, but was waived on May 31, 2005.

Shabazz signed with the Washington Redskins on August 17, 2005. He was waived on September 3, 2005.

He was signed by the New Orleans Saints on October 12, 2005. He appeared in two games for the Saints in 2005, recording one solo tackle, before being waived on November 7, 2005.

Shabazz signed with the Miami Dolphins on January 13, 2006. He was allocated to NFL Europe in 2006, where he played for the Rhein Fire during the 2006 NFL Europe season. He played in 10 games, starting seven, for the Fire, recording 44 tackles, one forced fumble, two fumble recoveries, one interception and four pass breakups. Shabazz was waived by the Dolphins on August 29, 2006.

Shabazz was signed by the Edmonton Eskimos of the Canadian Football League (CFL) on January 29, 2007. He played in 18 games in 2007, totaling 78 tackles on defense, 17 special teams tackles, four sacks, one forced fumble, three fumble recoveries and two pass breakups. He started all 18 games for the Eskimos during the 2008 season, accumulating 63 tackles on defense, six special teams tackles, three sacks, two forced fumbles, one fumble recovery and one interception. Shabazz was named the CFL defender of the week for the final week of the 2008 season after accumulating eight tackles, two sacks and a forced fumble.

On February 16, 2009, Shabazz was traded to the Winnipeg Blue Bombers for Kai Ellis. He signed a contract extension with the Blue Bombers on May 26, 2009. He appeared in 16 games, starting 15 games, for the Blue Bombers in 2009, recording 72 tackles on defense, 13 special teams tackles, one forced fumble, two fumble recoveries and four interceptions (two of which were returned for touchdowns. Shabazz was named the CFL defender of the month for July 2009. He was released by the Blue Bombers on April 16, 2010, a move that surprised Shabazz.

Shabazz later signed with the Las Vegas Locomotives on United Football League but was released on September 8, 2010.

He was signed to the practice roster of the Calgary Stampeders of the CFL on October 7, 2010. He was later promoted to the active roster and played in two games for the Stampeders in 2010, totaling two tackles on defense and one special teams tackle.
