= Chaparral High School (New Mexico) =

Public school in Chaparral, New Mexico

Location
- 800 S County Line Dr, Chaparral, NM 88081
- 32°02′38″N 106°23′00″W

Information
- Principal: Danielle Rodriguez
- Grades: 9–12
- Enrollment: 1,067
- Mascot: Lobo
- Website: chs.gisd.k12.nm.us

Chaparral High School is a public high school in Chaparral, New Mexico. As of the 2024–25 school year, it had 1,067 students.

== Athletics ==
=== Football ===
In 2024, the Chaparral High School football team won their first ever post-season playoff in beating Portales High School in the first round. Head coach Joseph Frias, who also led Chaparral in a historic 2025 season, reaching the semi-finals before losing to St. Pius X High School, was hired by Mayfield High School in 2026.
