= Butterfield Park, New Mexico =

- Census-designated place
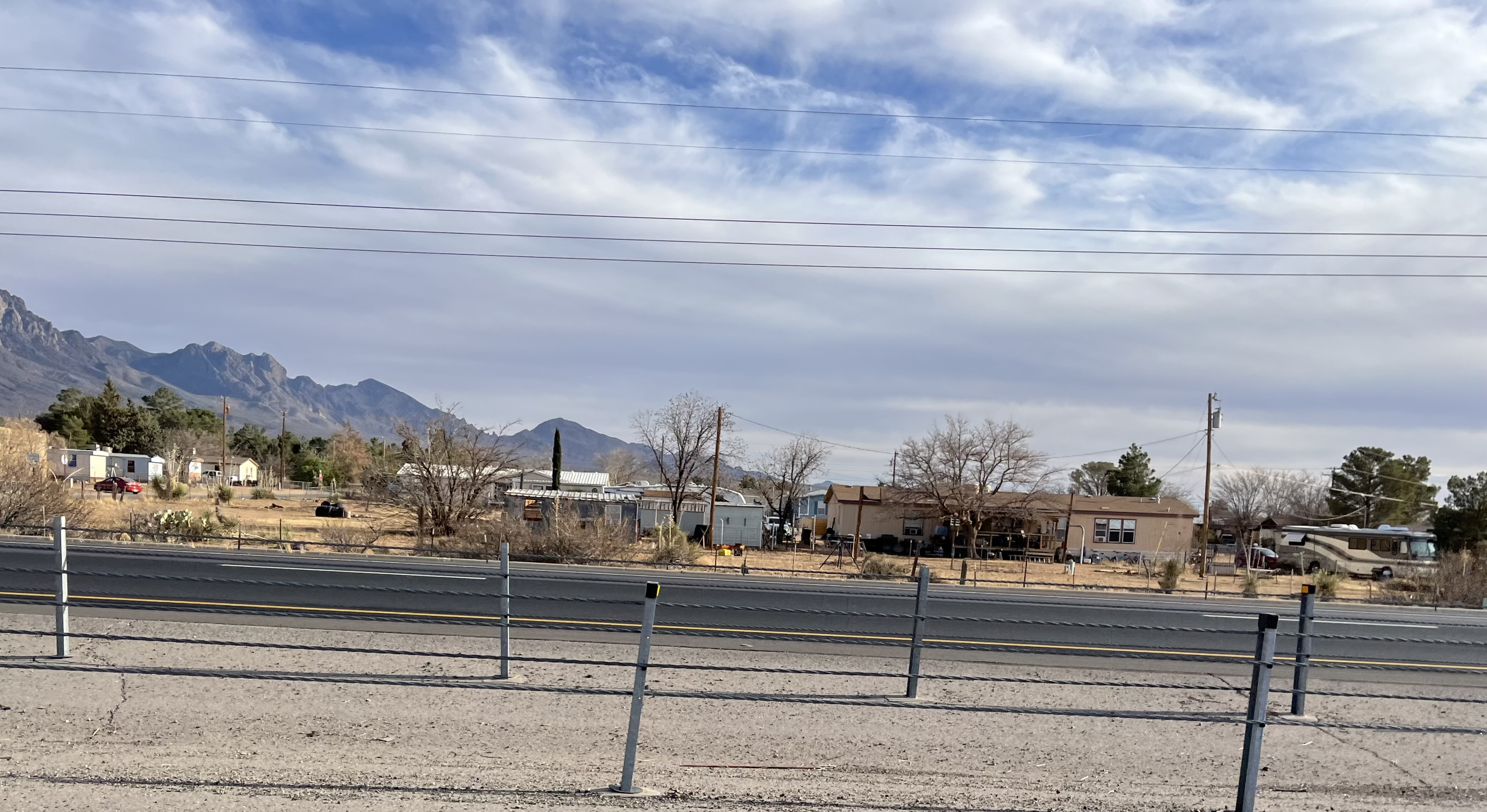

- Location within New Mexico Location within the United States
- Coordinates: 32°24′19″N 106°38′48″W
- Country: United States
- State: New Mexico
- County: Doña Ana

Area
  - Total: 0.45 sq mi (1.16 km^{2})
  - Land: 0.45 sq mi (1.16 km^{2})
  - Water: 0 sq mi (0.00 km^{2})
- Elevation: 4,610 ft (1,410 m)

Population (2020)
  - Total: 794
  - Density: 1,765.3/sq mi (681.58/km^{2})
- Time zone: UTC-7 (Mountain (MST))
  - Summer (DST): UTC-6 (MDT)
- ZIP Code: 88011 (Las Cruces)
- Area code: 505
- FIPS code: 35-09980
- GNIS feature ID: 2806697

Butterfield Park is an unincorporated community and census-designated place (CDP) in Doña Ana County, New Mexico, United States. As of the 2020 census, Butterfield Park had a population of 794. It was first listed as a CDP prior to the 2020 census.

The community is in eastern Doña Ana County, on the south side of U.S. Route 70, which leads southwest 11 miles (18 km) to Las Cruces and northeast 57 miles (92 km) to Alamogordo.

It is located in Las Cruces Public Schools.

== Demographics ==
Historical population
Census	Pop.	Note	%±
2020	794		—
U.S. Decennial Census
