= Doña Ana Community College =

Community college in Doña Ana County, New Mexico, U.S.

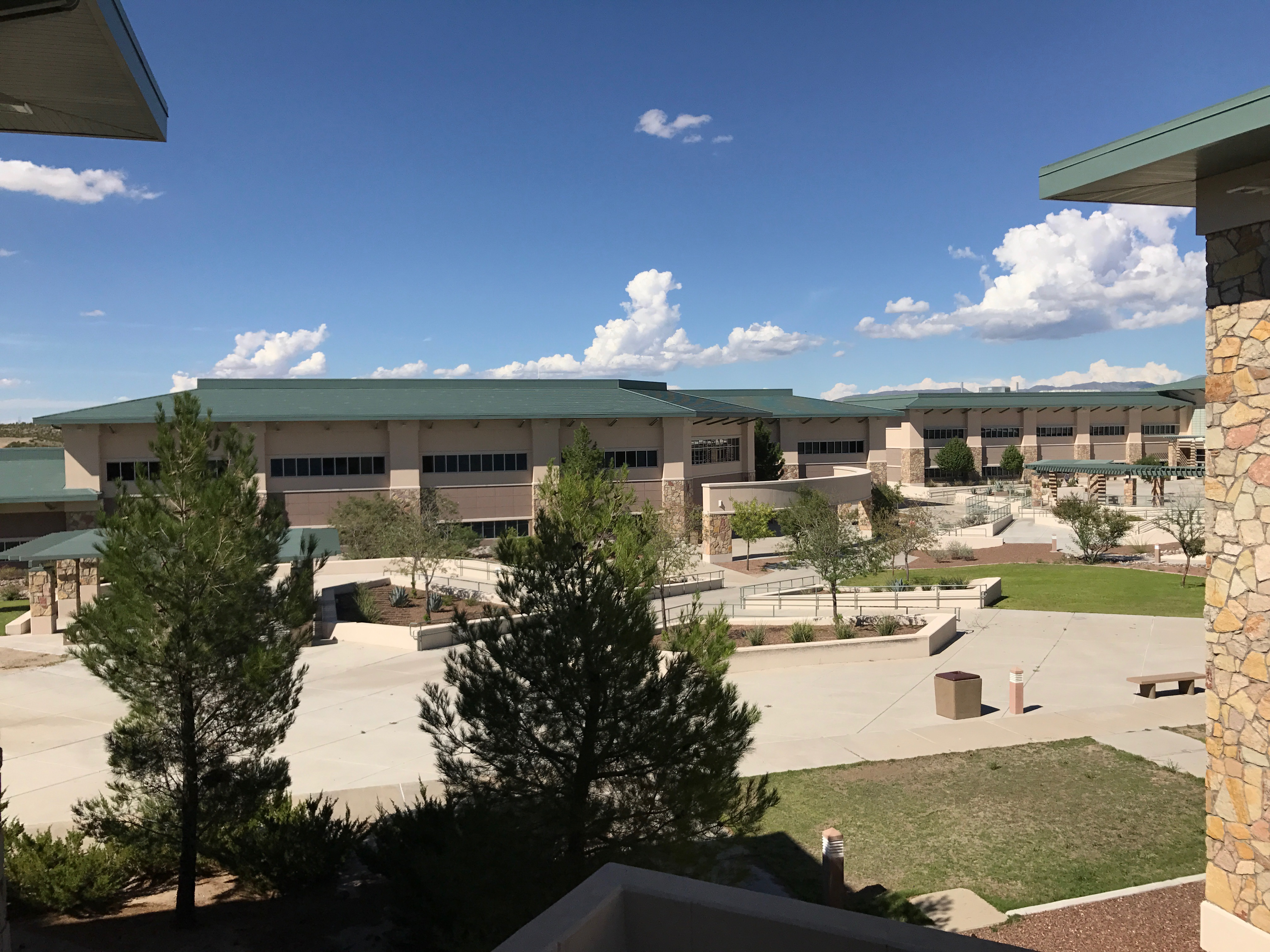
- DACC East Mesa Campus
- Former name: Doña Ana Branch Community College
- Type: Public community college
- Established: 1973
- Academic affiliations: Space-grant
- President: Mónica Torres
- Academic staff: 536
- Administrative staff: 310
- Students: Credit: 10,644 (2016-2017); Non-credit: 3,498 (2016-2017)
- Location: Las Cruces, New Mexico, U.S. 32.2761°N 106.7554°W
- Campus: Small City
- Nickname: Aggies
- Website: dacc.nmsu.edu

Doña Ana Community College is a public community college with several campuses located in Doña Ana County, New Mexico. It was established in 1973 at the request of the Gadsden, Hatch, and Las Cruces school boards to provide vocational and technical education opportunities to the residents of Doña Ana County. The college is independently accredited by The Higher Learning Commission and is a branch of New Mexico State University. It offers instruction leading to associate degrees and technical certificates, as well as academic preparation for further university-level study. Dual credit courses are also available in collaboration with local high schools.

As of 2017, the school had 10,644 credit students (including part-time) and 3,498 non-credit students.

== Campus ==
Doña Ana Community College operates six campuses and centers across Doña Ana County. Three of these—Espina Campus, East Mesa Campus, and the Workforce Center—are located in Las Cruces. The remaining campuses are located in Anthony (Gadsden Campus), Sunland Park, and Chaparral.

The East Mesa Campus, situated on the northeast side of Las Cruces, hosts most of the college’s general education programs, along with programs in criminal justice, culinary arts, business, creative media, and information technology. The Espina Campus, located on the west side of the New Mexico State University main campus, serves as the primary location for health sciences and trades programs. The Workforce Center, in central Las Cruces, provides customized employee training and career and technical education, including truck driving and industry certifications.

The Gadsden Center, located in the southeastern part of the county in Anthony, offers general and adult education programs. The Sunland Park Center, in Santa Teresa, offers general education, adult basic education, and welding. The Chaparral Center provides adult basic education and continuing education classes. Dual credit programs are offered in partnership with area high schools.

== Accreditation ==
The school is accredited by the Higher Learning Commission. Several programs at Doña Ana Community College have specialized accreditation:

- American Dental Association – Commission on Dental Accreditation
- American Design Drafting Association
- American Welding Society
- Accreditation Commission on Education in Nursing
- Accreditation Council for Business Schools and Programs
- Commission on Accreditation for Respiratory Care
- Commission on Accreditation of Allied Health Education Programs
- International Fire Service Accreditation Congress
- Joint Review Committee on Education in Radiologic Technology
- Joint Review Commission for Education in Diagnostic Medical Sonography
- Automotive Service Excellence Education Foundation
- The National Center for Construction Education and Research

=== Nursing program ===
In 2012, the National League for Nursing Accrediting Commission revoked accreditation for the college's nursing program. Although the New Mexico Board of Nursing permitted the program to continue, accreditation is a prerequisite for employment in most hospitals and acceptance into other nursing programs, such as the one at New Mexico State. In 2010 the school had been placed on warning status by the commission for having an inadequate ratio of qualified instructors. A lawsuit filed in 2013 by eight nursing students alleges that the school had not notified students of the warning, and had been made aware of the problem as early as 2002. In May 2015, a state judge ruled that the lawsuit would become a class action, and would include the 100 students enrolled at the time. In August 2015, it was announced that accreditation had been fully restored. This applied retroactively to students who graduated the previous May.
