= Herbert A. Collins =

Canadian-American painter

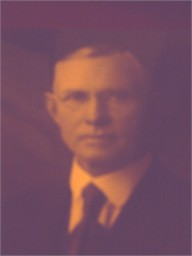
- Herbert A. Collins, Sr.
- Born: October 21, 1865; West Williams Township, Middlesex County, Canada West
- Died: December 5, 1937 (aged 72); Berkeley, California, U.S.
- Known for: Painter of Landscape art and portraits

Herbert Alexander Collins, Sr., (1865–1937) was a Canadian-born American artist. He was known nationally in the United States as a landscape and portrait painter.

== Early years ==
Herbert was born on October 21, 1865, in West Williams Township, Middlesex County, Canada West. He was the son of James Hamilton Collins and Lucinda Collins, both of whom were born in Ontario. His mother's father, William Collins, was born in Scotland. "At 17, Collins was apprenticed to J. W. Forster of Toronto, one of the foremost portrait painters in Canada. His progress was so rapid that before completing the first year of his apprenticeship, he painted a portrait of Honorable Albion Rawlings, a member of the Ontario Parliament."

== A start in Omaha ==
His apprenticeship ended after he incurred a serious injury at a barn raising, followed by contracting pneumonia. Collins convalesced with his aunt, Jean Anderson Collins Shontz, and uncle, Benjamin Shontz in Omaha, Nebraska. He emigrated to the United States in 1884. His younger brother James A Collins was also a portrait artist. Herbert and James had an artist shop together in Omaha, Nebraska in 1885.

While in Omaha, he painted portraits of Nebraska governors James W. Dawes, James E. Boyd and Senator John Thurston. He also painted portraits of General Nelson A. Miles, General Brooks, General George Crook, and General Oliver O. Howard of Fort Omaha as well as English actress Olga Nethersole.

On October 17, 1888, he married Mary E. Straight in Chicago, Illinois. She was born on November 12, 1867, in Mount Orab, Ohio. Her parents were born in Ohio. Together they had 9 children, six of which survived. Their children were born between 1891 and 1904. He was in Omaha in 1889 and 1890.

== Artistic career ==
"In 1890 Collins and family moved to Chicago, where he continued his career." "Among the outstanding achievements of this period was a crayon portrait, eight feet long, of John Plankinton, owner and operator of the Plankinton Hotel, Milwaukee, Wisconsin. For this piece of work he was said to have received the highest price ever paid in this country for a crayon portrait. Later, the Plankinton Hotel was destroyed by fire and the picture with it."

In 1893 he went to London for six months and studied at the Royal Academy. While there he met Henry Charles Heath, the noted miniature painter. This contact marked the beginning of his specialty of miniature portraits painted with watercolor on ivory."

In June 1900, the census recorded them living in Chicago's 31st Ward on Bishop Street. They already had 4 children. He worked as a portrait artist.

During a four-month stay in Mexico City in 1903, he painted a portrait of Mexican President Porfirio Diaz, the Secretary of State, and other high Mexican Officials. The portrait of Diaz was destroyed in the 1910 revolution.

In 1904, he painted a portrait of Charles Hackley, which was hung in Mr. Hackley's newly completed gift to Muskegon, Michigan, of the Hackley Hospital.

In 1910, he and his family lived in Hagerman, Idaho, where he was an artist. In 1920, they lived in Gooding, Idaho, where he worked as an art instructor. He was a member of the Lincoln Lodge while there. The Hagerman High School senior class of 1919 commissioned him to do a landscape of Stanley Lake in the Sawtooth Range as their class gift.

In 1911, the Idaho legislature voted for an appropriation for painting the portraits of all territorial and state governors, including the then incumbent, James H. Hawley. Herbert entered the open competition and was awarded the contract. This resulted in a total of twenty pictures being painted in Boise that year. His "portraits of Idaho Governors (are) hanging in the Boise Capitol Building"...

Herbert made several significant portraits of naturalist John Muir. The Sierra Club uses one of his portraits in their biographical materials about Muir. One of these portraits is in the collection of the College of the Siskiyous in Weed, California.

== Move to California ==
He moved to California in 1921. He settled in Berkeley, California, after a short time in Los Angeles. While in Berkeley he painted portraits of Mr. and Mrs W. H. Heywood in 1923.

Two years after the death of Mary Straight Collins in 1925, he married Josephine J. Pratt of London Ontario. She was born about 1864, emigrated to the United States in 1887, and died in 1950.

"In the period 1928–34 he went into semi-retirement with his wife near Los Gatos, California, they did considerable traveling, but he kept up his interest in art by painting a number of landscapes. In 1930, he is shown in the census with Josephine in Redwood Township, Santa Clara County, California. Redwood Township is in the area of the modern cities of Los Gatos, Monte Sereno and Saratoga California.

== National Park Service ==
"Through the years 1934 to 1937, inclusive, he worked as Artist-Preparator in the Western Museum Laboratories, National Park Service, Berkeley, California. ... This was the happiest period of his professional life ..."

His portrait of an Indian Camp near the Tetons hangs in the Colter Bay Indian Arts Museum in Grand Teton National Park. His painting of the legend of Mato the Bear hangs over the fireplace in the visitors center at Devils Tower National Monument. His work is also on display in the visitor center of Tumacácori National Historical Park.

He did portraits of National Park Service Directors Stephen Mather, Horace M. Albright, and Arno B. Cammerer.

Herbert A. Collins, Sr. and his son Herbert A. Collins, Jr. were commissioned in the spring of 1937, the final year of his life, to paint six Yosemite Valley reconstructions for the Yosemite National Park Museum. These oil paintings show how the valley might have looked at six different times during its geographic evolution. They are also reproduced in the book The Incomparable Valley.

His portraits of the Kent family are in the Muir Woods National Monument in Marin County, California. They were unveiled not long before his death.

His Oakland Tribune second page obituary summarized his career by saying that he was "widely heralded for his portrait artistry" and that "he did much work for the National Park Service".

== Death and legacy ==
He died at his home of a heart attack on December 5, 1937, in Berkeley, California. His funeral was on December 7, 1937, at the Berg Chapel, officiated by Dr. Horace Westerwood. He was buried in Mountain View Cemetery in Oakland, California. He was living at 2119 Addison Street in Berkeley at the time. He was survived by his wife, two daughters, and four sons.

His son William W. Collins became a photographer.
