= Charles T. Sinclair =

American criminal

Charles Thurman Sinclair
- Born: Charles Thurman Sinclair; November 24, 1946; Jal, New Mexico, U.S.
- Died: October 30, 1990 (aged 43); Anchorage, Alaska, U.S.
- Resting place: Alaska
- Criminal charges: Aggravated kidnapping; Attempted murder; Burglary; Murder

Details
- Victims: 13; total unconfirmed
- Span of crimes: 1980–1990
- Country: United States
- States: California; Indiana; Montana; New Mexico; Utah; Washington
- Date apprehended: August 13, 1990

Charles Thurman Sinclair, also known as the Coin Shop Killer, was an American criminal suspected of various murders of coin shop owners between the early 1980s and the 1990s. He was categorized as a nomadic killer who was linked to murders across the western United States and Canada.

Sinclair has been linked to eleven homicides, one attempted murder and two rapes. He targeted coin shop owners in order to rob them of valuable coin collections. His victims were killed to eliminate any witnesses to the event, not out of any known or specific malice.

== Background ==
Charles Sinclair was born and raised in the small town of Jal, New Mexico. He was the youngest of four children from a working-class family. Sinclair lost his father at a young age, leaving his mother to support the family by operating a coin laundry and taking in ironing.

Sinclair started a coin shop in the 1970s in Hobbs, New Mexico, using his own coin collection. He expanded his store to sell a wide range of guns. In 1985, Sinclair's shop burned down. There were investigations for arson but no one was ever charged. The destruction of his only means of income led to defaults on bank loans. When creditors tried to repossess his gun stock he had used as collateral, Sinclair and his family left Hobbs.

== Victims ==
Sinclair invoked the same method of robbery for each victim: he would make himself known to the owners of a coin shop by talking to them frequently about coins, visiting the shop multiple times a day, and pretending to be interested in making a purchase. This constant interaction with the owners created an image of a trustworthy regular customer, when, in fact, he was learning the traits and attributes of the store and its owners. One day, he would arrive close to closing time with a small-caliber weapon with which he would shoot and kill the owners, then rob the store. The murder was usually committed with a gun, and consisted of a headshot resulting in immediate death.

On July 31, 1990, Charles Sparboe (60), the owner of a Billings, Montana, coin shop, was killed along with his assistant Catharine Newstrom (47), with a .22 caliber handgun. The 10-year-old coin shop was also robbed of $54,000 in coins and gold. Similar to the other killings, Sinclair had lingered around the shop, making himself accustomed and known to the owners by representing himself as a farmer from a town close by.

Jim Sparboe, the son of Charles Sparboe, became suspicious of the frequency of Sinclair's visits, his conspicuous distance in parking, and his "banker-smooth" hands. However, he failed to act in time leading to his returning to the shop to find his father and assistant Newstrom dead. Jim Sparboe provided information about the circumstances leading up to the murders and information that was used to create a composite drawing of the suspect.

=== Attempted murder ===
For several days, a polite Texan wanting to invest in coins frequented Legacy Rare Coins in Murray, Utah multiple times a day. On May 4, 1990, Sinclair (posing as "Jim Stockton") waited around until owner Kelly Finnegan closed up the shop. As he put his valuables in the safe, Sinclair murmured, "dumb bastard".

Finnegan turned his head towards Sinclair and was met with a shot to the forehead. Despite being shot in the head, Finnegan survived. The bullet managed to not seriously wound him and he remained conscious. He pretended to be dead on the floor as Sinclair robbed the store of around $60,000 worth of merchandise. In his pocket was an antique pocket watch that he had stolen out of the shop's safe; his son was wearing a Rolex watch that Sinclair had stolen from the coin shop's other owner.

=== Non-coin shop murder ===
Robert and Dagmar Linton were a working-class couple from the city of Lodi, located in San Joaquin County, California. The soon-to-be retirees loved the outdoors and frequently took short trips to Lake Camanche and New Hogan Reservoir.

In the summer of 1986, they headed towards the northwest in hopes of reaching Vancouver to see the World's Fair. As they worked their way north for the first month, they frequently called home. When they reached Washington state, the phone calls stopped. The red and white trailer they had been traveling in was found empty at a campground in Washington state by a campground staff member. Their pickup was abandoned at the Seattle Tacoma Airport. It was mostly clean except for small amounts of blood in the wooden ceiling material of the camper shell. The blood included three distinct types: one matching Robert; one matching Dagmar; and one unknown. Inside the trailer, there was evidence of distress and a struggle. Despite the lack of remains, the family and authorities concluded that Robert and Dagmar Linton were murdered. The memorial was held on October 19, 1986.

Pete Piccini was the main investigator in the case from Brinnon, Washington. Robert and Dagmar's credit cards were stolen and used repeatedly allowing Piccini to trace the transactions through several states. In one instance, a large, bearded white man with a bandaged right hand was seen using the Lintons’ credit cards to purchase a clarinet. When the credit card's use was reported through the media, all activity ceased. Piccini interviewed multiple suspects, including a suspicious looking man in a pawn shop with a bandage on his right hand. The investigation was tedious, leaving family members distressed and anxious about the ambiguous nature of the investigation.

On August 16, 1990, police officers in Alaska arrested Charles Thurman Sinclair for the potential connection to at least eight murders. The police officers raided his storage shed, where they found piles of maps, instruments used for creating false identifications, Claymore land mines, C-4 explosives, and valuable coins. More evidence was uncovered, solidifying the link to the murder of the Lintons, including the fact that Sinclair had the exact same scars on his right hand as did the man with bandages on his right hand that Piccini had previously interviewed due to his suspicious behavior in a coin shop earlier that year. There was also a clarinet found in Sinclair's home which was traced back to the Lintons’ stolen credit cards.

=== Linked crimes ===
There were many crimes that were linked to the Coin Shop Killer based upon victim characteristics (coin/antique dealers) and the manner of death (gunshot wounds to the head):

- David Sutton, of Everett, Washington, was found dead of a gunshot wound to the head on January 27, 1980. Sutton's antique store was robbed of $80,000 in silver dollars.
- Thomas Rohr, of Mishawaka, Indiana, was killed during a robbery of the coin shop he managed on August 28, 1985.
- Reuben Lee Williams aka Ruben Lucky Williams, of Vacaville, California, was killed with a gunshot wound to the head and his coin shop robbed on November 1, 1986. and marriage certificate lists his legal name as Reuben Lee Williams)
- Leo Cashatt, of Spokane, Washington, was killed with a gunshot wound to the head and his coin shop robbed on July 14, 1987.
- LeRoy Hoffman, of Kansas City, Missouri, was killed and his coin shop robbed of several thousand dollars' worth of coins on March 12, 1988. Hoffman had mentioned to his wife that a local farmer had frequented his store and inquired about selling a "large collection" of coins.

Pete Piccini, investigator of the Linton case, suspected Sinclair of the November 24, 1989 rape and murder of Amanda Stavik. However, DNA evidence from the crime led to the May 2019 conviction of Timothy Bass.

== Arrest ==
On August 16, 1990, Sinclair was arrested near his home in Kenny Lake, Alaska after being tracked down by investigators following the trail of bodies left across multiple states.

He was held in prison on a $500,000 bond in Palmer, Alaska while Montana authorities were seeking extradition.

Montana authorities charged Sinclair with the murders of Charles Sparboe and Catharine Newstrom and requested his extradition to stand trial. Utah authorities added charges of attempted criminal homicide and aggravated robbery for the attack on Kelly Finnegan at Legacy Rare Coins.

== Death ==
On October 30, 1990, Charles T. Sinclair died of heart failure in an Anchorage, Alaska jail cell.

== See also ==
- List of serial killers in the United States
