= Picacho Hills, New Mexico =

- Census-designated place
- Location within New Mexico Location within the United States
- Coordinates: 32°18′57″N 106°52′24″W
- Country: United States
- State: New Mexico
- County: Doña Ana

Area
  - Total: 3.24 sq mi (8.39 km^{2})
  - Land: 3.24 sq mi (8.39 km^{2})
  - Water: 0 sq mi (0.00 km^{2})
- Elevation: 4,137 ft (1,261 m)

Population (2020)
  - Total: 1,864
  - Density: 575.1/sq mi (222.06/km^{2})
- Time zone: UTC-7 (Mountain (MST))
  - Summer (DST): UTC-6 (MDT)
- ZIP Code: 88007 (Las Cruces)
- Area code: 505
- FIPS code: 35-56748
- GNIS feature ID: 2806699

Picacho Hills is a planned community and census-designated place (CDP) in Doña Ana County, New Mexico, United States. It was first listed as a CDP prior to the 2020 census. As of the 2020 census, Picacho Hills had a population of 1,864.

The community is in central Doña Ana County, 6 miles (10 km) west of the center of Las Cruces and on the west side of the Rio Grande valley, on a hillside rising above the older community of Picacho. The CDP takes its name from Picacho Hills Country Club, around which the residential areas of the community have been built.

It is located in Las Cruces Public Schools.

== Demographics ==
Historical population
Census	Pop.	Note	%±
2020	1,864		—
U.S. Decennial Census
