= San Pablo, New Mexico =

- Census-designated place
- Location within New Mexico
- Coordinates: 32°14′58″N 106°45′30″W
- Country: United States
- State: New Mexico
- County: Doña Ana

Area
  - Total: 1.22 sq mi (3.15 km^{2})
  - Land: 1.22 sq mi (3.15 km^{2})
  - Water: 0 sq mi (0.00 km^{2})
- Elevation: 3,872 ft (1,180 m)

Population (2020)
  - Total: 858
  - Density: 705/sq mi (272.3/km^{2})
- Time zone: UTC-7 (Mountain (MST))
  - Summer (DST): UTC-6 (MDT)
- Area code: 575
- GNIS feature ID: 2584211

San Pablo is a census-designated place in Doña Ana County, New Mexico, United States. As of the 2020 census, San Pablo had a population of 858. The community is located south of Las Cruces along New Mexico State Road 28.

== Geography ==
According to the U.S. Census Bureau, the community has an area of 1.217 square miles (3.15 km^{2}), all land.

== Demographics ==
Historical population
| Census | Pop. | Note | %± |
|---|---|---|---|
| 2020 | 858 | | — |
U.S. Decennial Census

== Education ==
It is located in Las Cruces Public Schools.
