= San Ysidro, Doña Ana County, New Mexico =

San Ysidro, New Mexico
- Census-designated place
- Location within New Mexico
- Coordinates: 32°21′24″N 106°48′46″W
- Country: United States
- State: New Mexico
- County: Doña Ana

Area
  - Total: 2.645 sq mi (6.85 km^{2})
  - Land: 2.645 sq mi (6.85 km^{2})
  - Water: 0 sq mi (0 km^{2})
- Elevation: 3,918 ft (1,194 m)

Population (2010)
  - Total: 2,090
  - Density: 790/sq mi (305/km^{2})
- Time zone: UTC-7 (Mountain (MST))
  - Summer (DST): UTC-6 (MDT)
- Area code: 575
- GNIS feature ID: 2584214

San Ysidro is a census-designated place in Doña Ana County, New Mexico. Its population was 2,090 as of the 2010 census.

== Geography ==
San Ysidro has an area of 2.645 square miles (6.85 km^{2}), all land.

== Education ==
It is served by the Las Cruces Public Schools.
