= Barbara Funkhouser =

American journalist

Barbara Funkhouser (March 1, 1930 – August 15, 2014) was an American journalist, newspaper editor, and writer. Funkhouser was the first woman to serve as editor of the El Paso Times, a position she held from 1980 until 1986.

== Early life ==
She was born on March 1, 1930, at the Hotel Dieu hospital in El Paso, Texas. She was raised on her family's farm in Fairacres, New Mexico, which her parents had purchased in 1924. Her father died when she was just six-years old, leaving her mother to run the family farm with hired farm workers. She graduated from Las Cruces Union High School in nearby Las Cruces, New Mexico, and received her bachelor's degree in 1952 from New Mexico State University. Following college, Funkhouser participated in six month exchange program in Belgium through 4-H. She then worked for 4-H, based in Washington, D.C. and Chicago, for five years before moving back to New Mexico.

== Journalism career ==
Funkhouser began her career in journalism in 1958 by working as a freelance journalist for approximately one year. She then joined the staff of a newspaper in Las Cruces for a year before being hired by the El Paso Times. Her career with the El Paso Times spanned more than three decades. She covered the El Paso film premiere, Firecreek, in 1968 and conducted interviews with director Vincent McEveety, screenwriter Calvin Clements, and actors, James Stewart and Barbara Luna. She also interviewed actor and baseball player, Kurt Russell, when he joined the El Paso Sun Kings when he was 21 years old. Funkhouser conducted the El Paso Times' interview with singer Vikki Carr in 1973.

Funkhouser served as editor of the El Paso Times from 1980 to 1986, becoming the first woman to hold that position.

== Later years ==
She retired from the El Paso Times on June 1, 1990, after more than thirty years with the newspaper. She then joined the faculty of New Mexico State University and worked as a part-time editorial writer for the Las Cruces Sun-News. Funkhouser recorded an oral history in an interview with the New Mexico Farm and Ranch Heritage Museum in July 1996. She also wrote and published her book, "The Caregivers: El Paso's Medical History, 1898-1998." Funkhouser owned and operated the Tatreault Vineyard, located on her family's farm in Fairacres, until her death in 2014.

Barbara Funkhouser died at her home in Fairacres, New Mexico, on August 15, 2014, at the age of 84. Her memorial service was held at St. James Episcopal Church in Las Cruces, New Mexico, on August 26, 2014.
