= Hagerman High School =

Public school in New Mexico, United States

Location
- 406 North Cambridge Avenue; Hagerman, New Mexico; United States; 33°07′08″N 104°19′32″W

Information
- Type: Public, General
- School district: Hagerman Central
- Faculty: 10 full-time
- Teaching staff: 13.64 (FTE)
- Grades: 9–12
- Enrollment: 125 (2023–2024)
- Student to teacher ratio: 9.16
- Colors: Kelly Green and White
- Mascot: Bobcat

Hagerman High School is a small public high school / secondary school, located in Hagerman, New Mexico, southwest of larger nearby Roswell.

== Sports ==
Hagerman High School has a gymnasium with a seating capacity of 600, over four times its enrollment, for its teams, the Bobcats. Bobcats have nine football state championships, the last being in 2013 with a 12–0 record.

=== Esports ===
Hagerman High School fields an esports program and PlayVS in titles such as Mario Kart 8 Deluxe and Rocket League. In 2025, the team won the NMAA Class A–2A Mario Kart 8 Deluxe state championship and also claimed the overall 2A esports title. In 2026, the team repeated as Class A–2A Mario Kart 8 Deluxe state champions and placed third overall in the NMAA esports standings.

== Partnership with Eastern New Mexico University ==
The high school has a "partnership" with Eastern New Mexico University (ENMU), located in Portales (county seat of Roosevelt County) and with two other smaller satellite campuses. Hagerman High students attend workshops at ENMU, and have access to special scholarships from ENMU.

== Art ==
The Senior Class of 1919 commissioned a landscape by noted artist Herbert A. Collins of Stanley Lake in the Sawtooth Range, which was presented to the school.

== Notable alumni ==
- Rod Adair, member of the New Mexico Senate

== See also ==
- Eastern New Mexico University
- List of high schools in New Mexico
