= Las Cruces Public Schools =

School district in Las Cruces, New Mexico

- Las Cruces, Doña Ana, New Mexico

District information
- Type: Public
- Motto: Going Above and Beyond for Every Student, Every Day
- Established: 1918; 108 years ago
- Superintendent: Ignacio Ruiz

Students and staff
- Students: 25,000

Other information
- Website: https://www.lcps.net/

Las Cruces Public Schools (LCPS) is a school district headquartered in Las Cruces, New Mexico. The school district covers the city of Las Cruces as well as White Sands Missile Range, the settlement of Doña Ana, and the town of Mesilla. The system has 25 elementary schools, nine middle schools, and six high schools. Of the high schools, St. Mary's Catholic high school, Alma D'Arte, Las Montañas, and Arrowhead Park Early College High School are alternative high schools, and there are nearly 25,000 students and 3,600 employees. LCPS is the second-largest school district in New Mexico.

== History ==
In 1918, Las Cruces Union High School (now just Las Cruces High School) opened in the area.

Segregation came to Las Cruces in the 1910s and was made an option for districts codified by state law in 1924. In Las Cruces, Lincoln High School opened in a church after African Americans were removed from integrated schools and in the 1930s Booker T. Washington School opened at 755 East Chestnut, serving African Americans of all grades. Clara Belle Williams, who was the first African American to graduate from the predecessor of New Mexico State University, was Lincoln's first teacher and taught at the schools for more than 20 years.

== Service area ==
Areas in the district include: Las Cruces, Butterfield Park, Doña Ana, Fairacres, Mesilla, Organ, Picacho Hills, Radium Springs, San Pablo, San Ysidro, Tortugas, University Park, and White Sands. White Sands Missile Range is in the district.

== Schools ==
=== High schools ===
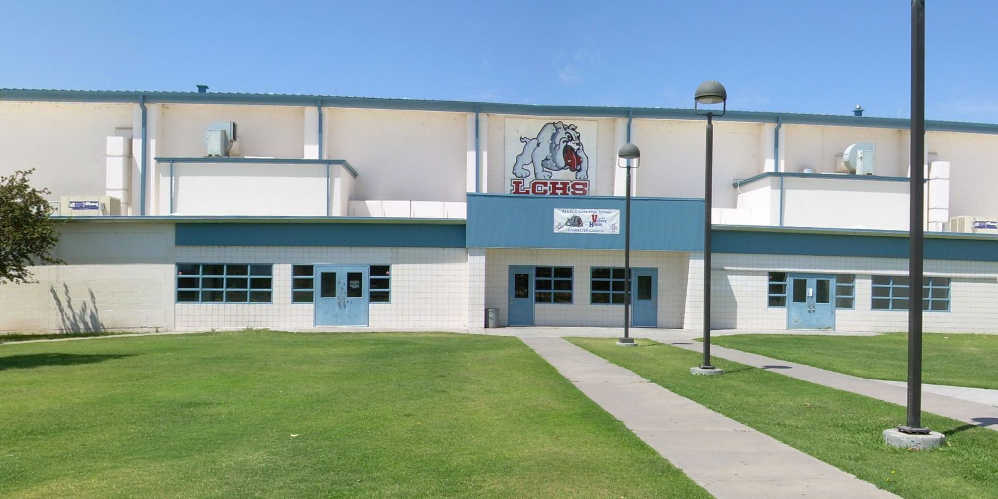
Las Cruces High School

- Arrowhead Park Early College High School and Medical Academy
- Centennial High School
- Las Cruces High School
- Mayfield High School
- Organ Mountain High School
- Rio Grande Preparatory Institute

=== Middle schools ===
- Camino Real Middle School
- Lynn Middle School
- Mesa Middle School
- Mesilla Valley Leadership Academy
- Picacho Middle School
- Sierra Middle School
- Vista Middle School
- White Sands School
- Zia Middle School

=== Elementary schools ===
- Alameda Elementary School
- Booker T. Washington Elementary School
- Central Elementary School
- Cesar Chavez Elementary School
- Columbia Elementary School (school under reconstruction due to mold; currently based within Centennial High School)
- Conlee Elementary School
- Desert Hills Elementary School
- Doña Ana Elementary School
- East Picacho Elementary School
- Fairacres Elementary School
- Hermosa Heights Elementary School
- Highland Elementary School
- Hillrise Elementary School
- Jornada Elementary School
- Loma Heights Elementary School
- MacArthur Elementary School
- Mesilla Elementary School
- Mesilla Park Elementary School
- Monte Vista Elementary School
- Sonoma Elementary School
- Sunrise Elementary School
- Tombaugh Elementary School
- University Hills Elementary School
- Valley View Elementary School
- White Sands School
