= Clara Belle Williams =

American educator (1885–1994)

- Born: Clara Belle Drisdale; October 29, 1885; LaGrange, Texas
- Died: July 3, 1994 (aged 108)
- Citizenship: United States
- Education: New Mexico College of Agriculture & Mechanic Arts (now New Mexico State University)
- Occupation: Teacher
- Employer(s): Booker T. Washington School, Las Cruces, New Mexico
- Known for: Being the first Black-American graduate of New Mexico State University
- Spouse: Jasper Williams (m. 1917)
- Children: Charles, Jasper, James

Clara Belle Williams (October 29, 1885 – July 3, 1994) was the first African-American graduate of New Mexico College of Agriculture and Mechanic Arts (now New Mexico State University), became an educator, and raised three sons who became doctors.

== Early life and marriage ==
Williams was born Clara Belle Drisdale in Plum, Texas, on October 29, 1885. She pursued her education on scholarship at the Prairie View Normal and Independent College, graduating as valedictorian in 1905.

In 1910, she studied at The University of Chicago in Chicago, Illinois. She married Jasper Williams in 1917 and they had three sons.

== College and graduate studies, teaching ==
In 1928, Williams enrolled at the New Mexico College of Agriculture and Mechanic Arts. She earned her diploma with a Bachelor of Arts degree in English in 1937, at the age of 51. She was the first African American to graduate from the New Mexico College. For the duration of her studies, professors did not allow her into the lecture halls; she took notes and attended classes in the hallway. Williams continued her studies with graduate classes into the 1950s.

Williams taught at Lincoln High School, which opened in an A.M.E. Church in Las Cruces after the institution of segregation removed African-American students from integrated Las Cruces schools in the 1920s when state law allowed districts to segregate. She later taught at Booker T. Washington School in Las Cruces for more than twenty years, after it opened in the 1930s.

== Family and legacy ==
All three of her sons became doctors: Jasper Jr., James, and Charles. Williams worked as a receptionist for her sons' practices.

In 1961, New Mexico State University named a street on its campus after Williams. In 1977, she was inducted into the National Education Association teachers' hall of fame. In 1980, Williams was awarded an honorary doctorate of laws degree by New Mexico State University, which also apologized for the treatment Williams was subjected to as a student. In 2005, the building of the university's English department was renamed Clara Belle Williams Hall. New Mexico State University offers a scholarship for undergraduates in her memory.
