= Chaparral, New Mexico =

- Census-designated place
- Location of Chaparral, New Mexico

- Location in the United States
- Coordinates: 32°2′40″N 106°24′22″W
- Country: United States
- State: New Mexico
- Counties: Doña Ana, Otero

Area
  - Total: 59.07 sq mi (152.98 km^{2})
  - Land: 59.07 sq mi (152.98 km^{2})
  - Water: 0 sq mi (0.00 km^{2})
- Elevation: 4,082 ft (1,244 m)

Population (2020)
  - Total: 16,551
  - Density: 280.2/sq mi (108.19/km^{2})
- Time zone: UTC-7 (Mountain (MST))
  - Summer (DST): UTC-6 (MDT)
- ZIP codes: 88081
- Area code: 575
- FIPS code: 35-14250
- GNIS feature ID: 2408012

Chaparral is an unincorporated community and census-designated place (CDP) in Doña Ana and Otero counties, New Mexico. The population was 16,551 at the 2020 census. Chaparral is primarily a bedroom community for the neighboring city of El Paso, Texas, and the neighboring military installations of White Sands Missile Range and Fort Bliss. It is officially part of the Las Cruces Metropolitan Statistical Area.

== Geography ==
Chaparral is located in the southeast corner of Doña Ana County and the southwest corner of Otero County at 32°2′21″N 106°25′47″W (32.039072, −106.429630). Its southern border is the Texas state line, the northern limit of the city of El Paso. Chaparral is geographically isolated from the rest of Doña Ana County due to its location on the east side of the Franklin Mountains.

Downtown El Paso, Texas is 20 miles (32 km) to the south, Fort Bliss in Texas is 19 miles (31 km) to the south, and the White Sands Missile Range is 30 miles (48 km) to the north.

According to the United States Census Bureau, the Chaparral CDP has a total area of 59.2 square miles (153.4 km^{2}), all land.

== Demographics ==
Historical population
Census	Pop.	Note	%±
2020	16,551		—
U.S. Decennial Census

=== 2020 census ===
As of the 2020 census, Chaparral had a population of 16,551. The median age was 31.7 years. 31.0% of residents were under the age of 18 and 11.4% of residents were 65 years of age or older. For every 100 females there were 96.1 males, and for every 100 females age 18 and over there were 94.6 males age 18 and over.

0.0% of residents lived in urban areas, while 100.0% lived in rural areas.

There were 5,039 households in Chaparral, of which 44.4% had children under the age of 18 living in them. Of all households, 49.6% were married-couple households, 17.0% were households with a male householder and no spouse or partner present, and 26.8% were households with a female householder and no spouse or partner present. About 19.2% of all households were made up of individuals and 8.0% had someone living alone who was 65 years of age or older.

There were 5,660 housing units, of which 11.0% were vacant. The homeowner vacancy rate was 0.7% and the rental vacancy rate was 11.4%.

Racial composition as of the 2020 census
Race	Number	Percent
White	5,178	31.3%
Black or African American	152	0.9%
American Indian and Alaska Native	178	1.1%
Asian	47	0.3%
Native Hawaiian and Other Pacific Islander	3	0.0%
Some other race	5,369	32.4%
Two or more races	5,624	34.0%
Hispanic or Latino (of any race)	14,486	87.5%

=== 2000 census ===
As of the 2000 census, there were 6,117 people, 1,837 households, and 1,497 families residing in the CDP. The population density was 157.8 people per square mile (60.9 people/km^{2}). There were 2,134 housing units at an average density of 55.1 per square mile (21.3/km^{2}). The racial makeup of the CDP was 70.69% White, 1.26% African American, 1.29% Native American, 0.43% Asian, 0.18% Pacific Islander, 21.38% from other races, and 4.77% from two or more races. Hispanics or Latinos of any race were 64.49% of the population.

There were 1,837 households, out of which 48.9% had children under the age of 18 living with them, 62.6% were married couples living together, 14.1% had a female householder with no husband present, and 18.5% were non-families. 15.6% of all households were made up of individuals, and 5.2% had someone living alone who was 65 years of age or older. The average household size was 3.32 and the average family size was 3.70.

In the CDP, the population was spread out, with 36.2% under the age of 18, 9.1% from 18 to 24, 28.6% from 25 to 44, 18.9% from 45 to 64, and 7.1% who were 65 years of age or older. The median age was 29 years. For every 100 females, there were 101.1 males. For every 100 females aged 18 and over, there were 95.1 males.

The median income for a household in the CDP was $22,692, and the median income for a family was $26,153. Males had a median income of $23,904 versus $17,750 for females. The per capita income for the CDP was $10,033. About 25.2% of families and 31.3% of the population were below the poverty line, including 42.6% of those under age 18 and 24.8% of those age 65 or over.

== Education ==
As part of the Gadsden Independent School District, Chaparral has the following public schools:

=== Elementary schools ===
- Chaparral Elementary School
- Desert Trail Elementary School
- Sunrise Elementary School
- Yucca Heights Elementary school

=== Middle schools ===
- Chaparral Middle School

=== High schools ===
- Chaparral High School

Doña Ana Community College maintains a satellite campus in Chaparral.

== Transportation ==
Commercial air and rail transportation are available in the neighboring city of El Paso, Texas. Several highways (state and federal) pass through Chaparral:

- NM 213, which runs north–south connecting El Paso to White Sands Missile Range. In Chaparral it is known as War Highway (which refers to its construction during World War II as a military access road) and connects to Martin Luther King Boulevard (Texas Farm to Market Road 3255) at the El Paso city limits.
- NM 404, which runs east–west. This highway connects Chaparral to Anthony, New Mexico and Interstate 10, which is approximately 10 miles (16 km) to the west through the Anthony Gap. In both Anthony and Chaparral it is known as O'Hara Road.
- U.S. Route 54, which runs north–south along Chaparral's eastern border, connects to Dyer Street and the Patriot Freeway in El Paso.

== Town highlights ==
- Chaparral High School
- Dolores Wright Park

== Notable people ==
- Willie D. Madrid, member of the New Mexico House of Representatives
- Siddeeq Shabazz, professional football player
