= El Paso Times =

Newspaper in El Paso, Texas

- Type: Daily newspaper
- Format: Broadsheet
- Owner: USA Today Co.
- Editor: Tim Archuleta
- Founded: 1881
- Headquarters: 500 West Overland Street; Suite 150; El Paso, Texas; 79901
- Circulation: 9,625 (as of 2023)
- ISSN: 0746-3588
- Website: elpasotimes.com

The El Paso Times is the newspaper for the US city of El Paso, Texas. The paper is the only English-language daily in El Paso (after the El Paso Herald-Post, an afternoon paper, closed in 1997), but often competes with the Spanish-language El Diario de El Paso, an offshoot of El Diario de Juárez which is published across the Rio Grande in Ciudad Juárez, Mexico.

== History ==
El Paso Times' logo until 2020

The paper was founded in 1881 by Marcellus Washington Carrico. The Times first published April 2, 1881. It originally started out as a weekly but within a year's time, it became the daily newspaper for the frontier town.

Gannett bought the Times in 1972. In 2003, Gannett and MediaNews Group formed a partnership between the Times and MediaNews' New Mexico papers, with Gannett as the managing partner. In December 2005, Gannett became a minority partner in the El Paso Times, handing the majority of the partnership and management to Denver-based MediaNews Group. In 2015, Gannett acquired full ownership of the Texas-New Mexico Newspapers Partnership from MediaNews successor Digital First Media. Later that year, Gannett split into two, with one having broadcasting and digital properties (Tegna) and another with newspapers (the new Gannett). The latter retained the Times.

Barbara Funkhouser served as editor of the El Paso Times from 1980 to 1986, the first woman to hold that position. Zahira Torres became the editor of the paper in 2017, making her the second woman and first Latina to lead the El Paso Times.

In March 2022, The El Paso Times moved to a six day printing schedule, eliminating its printed Saturday edition.

== Sections ==
The El Paso Times prints news in several sections:

- A-section: all-local news cover page, with national, Mexico and international news in the inside pages
- Borderland: the metro news page has an all-local cover page as well as neighborhood, New Mexico and Texas news
- Sports: local and national sports, with an emphasis in high school and University of Texas at El Paso (UTEP) coverage
- Business: local and national business news
- Living: local and national feature stories including rotating sections covering senior citizens, religion, popular culture, the arts, books, health, home decor, entertainment news, local music and fashion
- Tiempo: a weekly entertainment guide, published on Fridays, which includes concerts, movies, galleries, restaurant reviews and other entertainment related stories
- Hot Ticket: published every Wednesday

== Other publications ==
The El Paso Times publishes several other weekly, biweekly and monthly publications:

- El Paso y Más: bi-weekly Spanish news coverage
- TV y Más: weekly television guide and Spanish entertainment magazine
- Cars & Trucks: weekly auto trader guide

== Notable people ==
- Steve Almond, American short story writer and essayist
- Paul Salopek, American journalist and writer
- W. E. "Pete" Snelson, sports editor (1940–1943), later member of both houses of the Texas State Legislature from Midland
