= Gadsden High School (New Mexico) =

Coordinates: 31°59′51″N 106°39′21″W

Location
- 6301 Hwy 28; Anthony, New Mexico 88021; United States

Information
- Type: Independent high school
- Established: 1928
- Principal: Maria Legarreta
- Teaching staff: 73.28 (FTE)
- Enrollment: 1,288 (2023-2024)
- Student to teacher ratio: 17.58
- Colors: Maroon and gold
- Athletics conference: NMAA, 5A Dist. 3
- Mascot: Panther
- Website: gisd.k12.nm.us

Gadsden High School (GHS), originally named Valley High School, is a public high school in unincorporated Doña Ana County, New Mexico, United States, with an Anthony, New Mexico, postal address. Gadsden High School is administered by Gadsden Independent School District.

Gadsden High School serves the surrounding towns of Mesquite, Vado, Berino, La Mesa, San Miguel, Chamberino, La Union, and Anthony.

== Namesake ==
The school's name is in reference to the land acquisition known as the Gadsden Purchase.

== Athletics ==
GHS competes in the New Mexico Activities Association (NMAA), as a class 6A school in District 3. State championships in football: 1953, 1954, 1955, 1961, 1962. (https://www.nmact.org/file/Football_Past_Champs.pdf) State championships in volleyball: 2010, 2011 (https://www.nmact.org/file/Volleyball_Champions.pdf)

== Notable alumni ==
- A. Lee Martinez, fantasy and science fiction writer
- Siddeeq Shabazz, NFL safety and linebacker
