= Rio Grande Preparatory Institute =

Location
- 2355 Avenida de Mesilla; Mesilla, Dona Ana, New Mexico 88046; United States; 32°16′31″N 106°47′37″W

Information
- Principal: Julie Maestas
- Grades: 9–12
- Enrollment: 144
- Website: https://rgpi.lcps.net/

Rio Grande Preparatory Institute (RGPI) is an alternative high school in Mesilla, New Mexico. As of 2024, the school serves 144 students. The school is a part of Las Cruces Public Schools.

== History ==
RGPI was once host to the public library of Mesilla from 2012 to 2014, when the school forced the closure due to security concerns. In 2021, the gymnasium was painted with an homage to four major figures in Las Cruces Public Schools, including former superintendent Karen Trujillo and former Las Cruces High School principal Jim Hendee.

Michelle Ronga was appointed principal of the school in January 2023. Julie Maestas has been principal since July 2023.

In April 2026, in the wake of poor test results and declining enrollment, LCPS Superintendent Ignacio Ruiz moved to merge RGPI and the Mesilla Valley Leadership Academy into the proposed 6–12 Academy. The decision received criticism from the New Mexico Public Education Department, stating Ruiz's decision violated states requirements.

=== School structure ===
As an alternative high school, RGPI differs from standard high schools in their methods of teaching. RGPI reduces teacher-student ratios, focusing on one-on-one interactions, meant to foster creativity and original thinking.

== Demographics ==
As of the 2023–24 school year, RGPI has 144 students enrolled, with an average teacher-student ratio of 16–1. Ethnically, 86.1% of students are Hispanic, 10.4% is White, 2.1% are African-American, and 1.4% are of other ethnic groups.
