= Capitan High School =

Location
- 150 Forest Street; Capitan, New Mexico 88316; United States; 33°32′40″N 105°34′57″W

Information
- Type: Public
- School district: Capitan Municipal Schools
- Principal: Chris Rottman
- Faculty: 19.0
- Grades: 9 to 12
- Enrollment: 156 (2016–17)
- Colors: Orange & Black
- Mascot: Tiger
- Nickname: Fighting Tigers
- Website: hs.capitantigers.org

Capitan High School is a public high school located in Capitan, New Mexico, United States. The school has an enrollment of approximately 150 students in grades 9–12. Athletic teams are known as the Fighting Tigers and the school colors are orange and black.
