= Jal Public Schools =

School district in New Mexico, United States

Jal Public Schools is a school district headquartered in Jal, New Mexico.

The district is entirely in Lea County and includes Jal.

== History ==
In 2015 the school district voters approved a bond for $45,000,000 so the district could build new facilities.

== Schools ==
It includes an elementary school (Jal Elementary School) and a combined junior-senior high school (Jal Junior-Senior High School).

The current elementary school, which has an open concept, opened in 2017. It had a cost of $15,000,000.

The former Burke Junior High School has 37,900 square feet (3,520 m^{2}) of space. In 2019 Jal city authorities chose to turn it into a new city hall, with that function using 14,300 square feet (1,330 m^{2}) of space in an eastern portion. This was under construction in 2021.
