= Hagerman, New Mexico =

- Town
- Location of Hagerman, New Mexico

- Location in the United States
- Coordinates: 33°07′15″N 104°19′45″W
- Country: United States
- State: New Mexico
- County: Chaves

Area
  - Total: 1.36 sq mi (3.51 km^{2})
  - Land: 1.36 sq mi (3.51 km^{2})
  - Water: 0 sq mi (0.00 km^{2})
- Elevation: 3,422 ft (1,043 m)

Population (2020)
  - Total: 975
  - Density: 719.1/sq mi (277.63/km^{2})
- Time zone: UTC-7 (Mountain (MST))
  - Summer (DST): UTC-6 (MDT)
- ZIP code: 88232
- Area code: 575
- FIPS code: 35-31330
- GNIS feature ID: 2412718
- Website: www.hagerman-nm.us

Hagerman is a town in Chaves County, New Mexico, United States. As of the 2020 census, Hagerman had a population of 975.

== Geography ==
Hagerman is located in south-central Chaves County approximately 2 miles (3 km) west of the Pecos River. New Mexico State Road 2 passes through the town, leading northwest 24 miles (39 km) to Roswell, the county seat, and south 20 miles (32 km) to Artesia. NM 249 leads east from the center of town 32 miles (51 km) to the top of the Mescalero Ridge.

According to the United States Census Bureau, the town has a total area of 1.4 square miles (3.6 km^{2}), all land.

== Demographics ==
Historical population
Census	Pop.	Note	%±
1910	449		—
1920	476		6.0%
1930	609		27.9%
1940	854		40.2%
1950	1,024		19.9%
1960	1,144		11.7%
1970	953		−16.7%
1980	936		−1.8%
1990	961		2.7%
2000	1,168		21.5%
2010	1,257		7.6%
2020	975		−22.4%
U.S. Decennial Census

As of the census of 2000, there were 1,168 people, 397 households, and 296 families residing in the town. The population density was 846.8 inhabitants per square mile (327.0/km^{2}). There were 439 housing units at an average density of 318.3 per square mile (122.9/km^{2}). The racial makeup of the town was 67.55% White, 0.09% African American, 0.09% Native American, 0.09% Asian, 0.51% Pacific Islander, 28.94% from other races, and 2.74% from two or more races. Hispanic or Latino of any race were 63.18% of the population.

There were 397 households, out of which 41.8% had children under the age of 18 living with them, 55.2% were married couples living together, 13.9% had a female householder with no husband present, and 25.2% were non-families. 21.4% of all households were made up of individuals, and 11.1% had someone living alone who was 65 years of age or older. The average household size was 2.94 and the average family size was 3.47.

In the town, the population was spread out, with 36.2% under the age of 18, 7.3% from 18 to 24, 24.9% from 25 to 44, 18.8% from 45 to 64, and 12.8% who were 65 years of age or older. The median age was 31 years. For every 100 females, there were 93.4 males. For every 100 females age 18 and over, there were 89.1 males.

The median income for a household in the town was $23,295, and the median income for a family was $26,131. Males had a median income of $25,238 versus $17,708 for females. The per capita income for the town was $10,114. About 24.1% of families and 27.9% of the population were below the poverty line, including 35.4% of those under age 18 and 23.7% of those age 65 or over.

== Education ==
Hagerman is served by the Hagerman Municipal Schools, which operates the following schools:

- Hagerman Elementary School
- Hagerman Middle School
- Hagerman High School

The original Hagerman school building was built in the late 1800s. Between 1999 and 2003, the Hagerman Municipal Schools underwent significant construction, impacting the elementary and high school, creating more space for the growing student body population.
