= Arrowhead Park Early College High School and Medical Academy =

Arrowhead Park Early College High School

Location
- 3600 Arrowhead Dr; Las Cruces, New Mexico 88011; United States; 32.2740°N 106.7395°W

Information
- Type: Public high school
- Motto: "The road to success is not a path you find but a trail you blaze."
- Established: July 2010
- School district: Las Cruces Public Schools
- Superintendent: Ignacio Ruiz
- Principal: Dr. Keely Scruggs
- Teaching staff: 20.04 (FTE)
- Grades: 9–12
- Enrollment: 311 (2018-19)
- Student to teacher ratio: 16.92
- Colors: Maroon, Gold and Black
- Mascot: Trailblazers
- Website: arrowhead.lcps.net

Arrowhead Park Early College High School and Medical Academy is a high school in Las Cruces, New Mexico, United States. It is the newest high school inside Doña Ana County. The school specializes in graduating its students with at least a two-year college degree. The school opened in July 2010 and has 311 students as of most current data. There is a 26.92 student/teacher ratio. It is a part of Las Cruces Public Schools.

== Entrance ==
In order to be accepted into either the STEM school or Medical Academy the students must go through an application process in the winter of their eighth grade year. Roughly 140 students are enrolled each year from this application process.

== Purpose ==
The school was formed by Las Cruces Public Schools due to overcrowding at the four high schools in the city of Las Cruces, as well as offering an alternative for students.
