= Moreno Valley Preparatory =

Public school in New Mexico, United States

Moreno Valley Prep
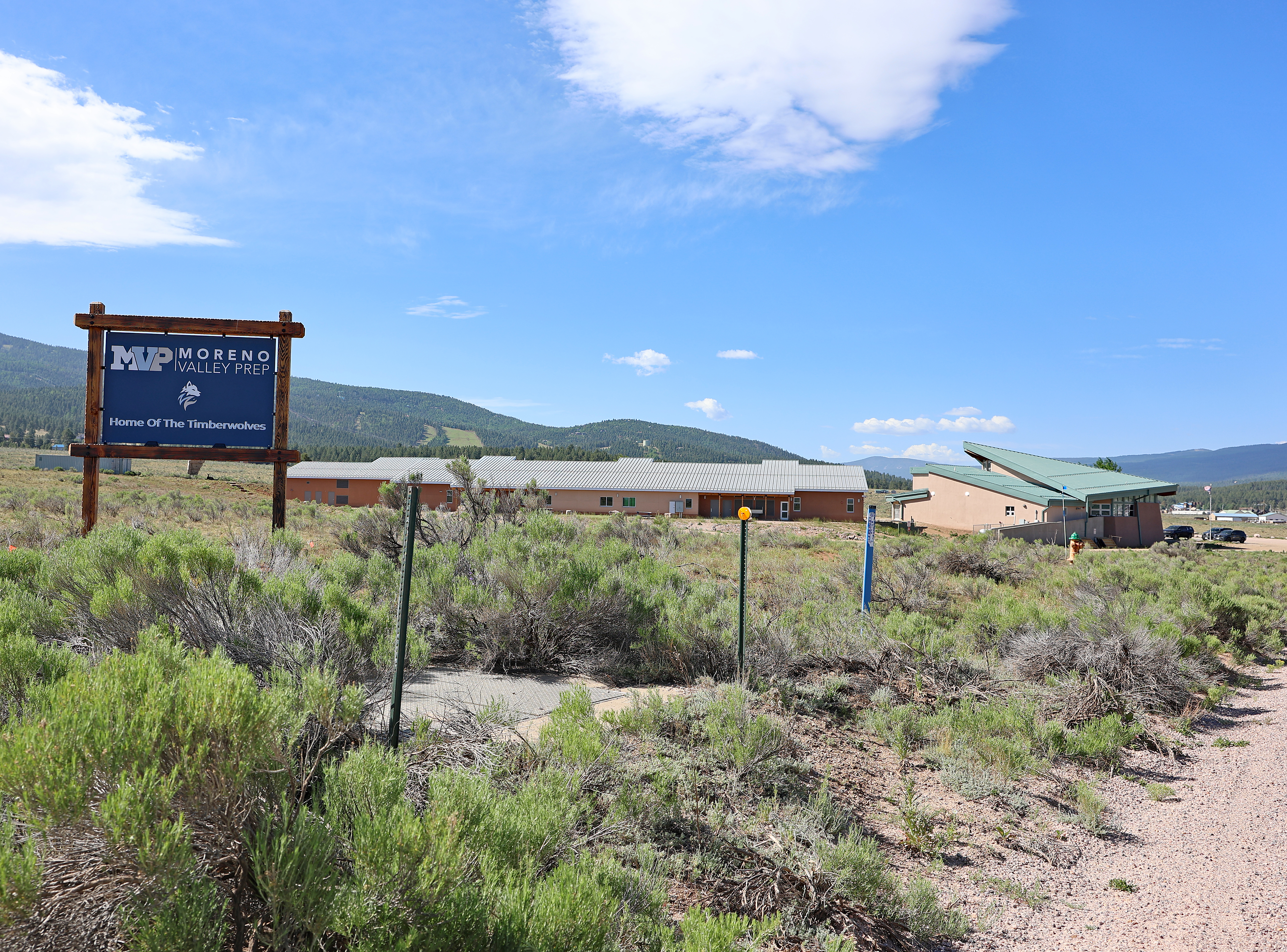
- The campus in 2026

Location
- 56 Camino Grande; Angel Fire, New Mexico 87710; USA
- 36.3995°N 105.2876°W

Information
- Former name: Moreno Valley High School (2001–2025)
- Type: Public
- Established: 2001
- School district: Cimarron
- Director: Tammy Dunn
- Faculty: 7.25 (FTE)
- Enrollment: 52 (2022–23)
- Student to teacher ratio: 7.17
- Athletics: Soccer, Snowboarding, Skiing Environmentally-based Fitness for Life
- Mascot: Timberwolf
- Colors: Blue, black & white
- Website: www.mvhsnm.org

Moreno Valley Preparatory, often shortened to Moreno Valley Prep, is a charter high school in Angel Fire, New Mexico. Founded by a group of Angel Fire citizens, the school was the first Paideia-based high school in New Mexico. It remains one of the only high schools totally based in Paideia methodology. Michael Strong was the first director, serving from 2001 to 2003. The school's charter was most recently renewed by the Cimarron School Board in 2025.

In 2025, the school's name was changed from its former name, Moreno Valley High School, to its new name, Moreno Valley Preparatory.

Moreno Valley Prep is nationally ranked by both the Washington Post's Challenge Index and by U.S. News & World Report and has been designated as a Gold Medal School.
