= Portales High School =

Public school in Portales, New Mexico

Location
- 201 S Knoxville Avenue; Portales, New Mexico; 34°11′14″N 103°19′21″W

Information
- Principal: Nathan Dodge
- Grades: 9–12
- Enrollment: 754
- Website: phs.portalesschools.com

Portales High School (PHS) is a public high school in Portales, New Mexico, serving 754 students between grades 9–12.

== History ==
During the COVID-19 pandemic, PHS returned to in-person school by the spring of 2021, though the school had to temporarily revert to online learning after 4 students contracted the virus within a 14-day period.

In 2023, a former PHS teacher sued the school district in federal court over allegations that she was forced to resign due to some parents' backlash against her selecting the novel The Hate U Give, which covered issues including police brutality, for class reading, though she did not actually teach it due to the fallout.

In 2024, it was announced that PHS, along with the rest of Portales Municipal Schools, would switch to a four-day school week, amidst concerns over staff recruitment and burnout.

== Sports ==
PHS has a series of sports offered, including basketball, football, and softball.
