= Organ Mountain High School =

Coordinates: 32°22′55.9″N 106°42′55.1″W

Location
- 5700 Mesa Grande Dr; Las Cruces, New Mexico 88012; United States

Information
- School type: Public, high school
- Founded: 1988
- School district: Las Cruces Public Schools
- Principal: Adrian Galaz
- Teaching staff: 110.48 (FTE)
- Grades: 9–12
- Enrollment: 2,063 (2023-2024)
- Student to teacher ratio: 18.67
- Campus: Suburban
- Color
- Athletics conference: NMAA, 6A Dist. 3/4
- Mascot: Knight
- Rival: Centennial High School
- Feeder schools: Camino Real, Mesa, Sierra, Vista, White Sands
- Website: https://omhs.lcps.net/

Organ Mountain High School (OMHS) is one of four public high schools in Las Cruces, New Mexico. As of the 2021–2022 school year, OMHS serves 1,874 students, grades 9–12. The school is a part of the Las Cruces Public Schools District.

== History ==
Organ Mountain High School was established in 1988 under the name of Oñate High School, eponymously named for Juan de Oñate, the first Spanish governor of New Mexico. It was originally located in what is now Sierra Middle School. Construction of OMHS's current building began in 1991 and was completed in 1993, making it Las Cruces' third public high school after Las Cruces High School (est. 1918) and Mayfield High School (est. 1965). The school's architectural style reflects a castle-like theme, its mascot is the knight, and its colors are black, white, and teal. It houses a planetarium and, at the time of its construction, the largest performing arts center of the Las Cruces' high schools.

The original name of the school, Oñate High School, was chosen by city vote while the school was under construction and the color teal was added to the school by the cheerleaders in order give the school more color. On August 4, 2020, the Las Cruces Public Schools Board of Education voted unanimously to rename the school Organ Mountain High School, which took effect the following academic year, 2021–2022.

== Academics ==
=== School grade ===
Beginning in the 2010–2011 academic year, the NMPED (New Mexico Public Education Department) replaced the No Child Left Behind Act and AYP testing with a new grading formula. Since then, grades and student performance have been calculated through various forms of testing which also include graduation rates.

School Year	Grade from NMPED
2010–11	B

== Athletics ==
OMHS competes in the New Mexico Activities Association (NMAA), as a class 6A school in District 3/4. In addition to Organ Mountain High School, the schools in District 3-6A include: Alamogordo High School, Carlsbad High School, Centennial High School, Las Cruces High School, and Hobbs High School.

State championships
Sport	Championships	Year(s)
Football	1	2002
Boys basketball	1	2011
Boys golf	1	2013
Girls track and field	3	1990, 1991, 1992
Total		6
