= McCurdy Charter School =

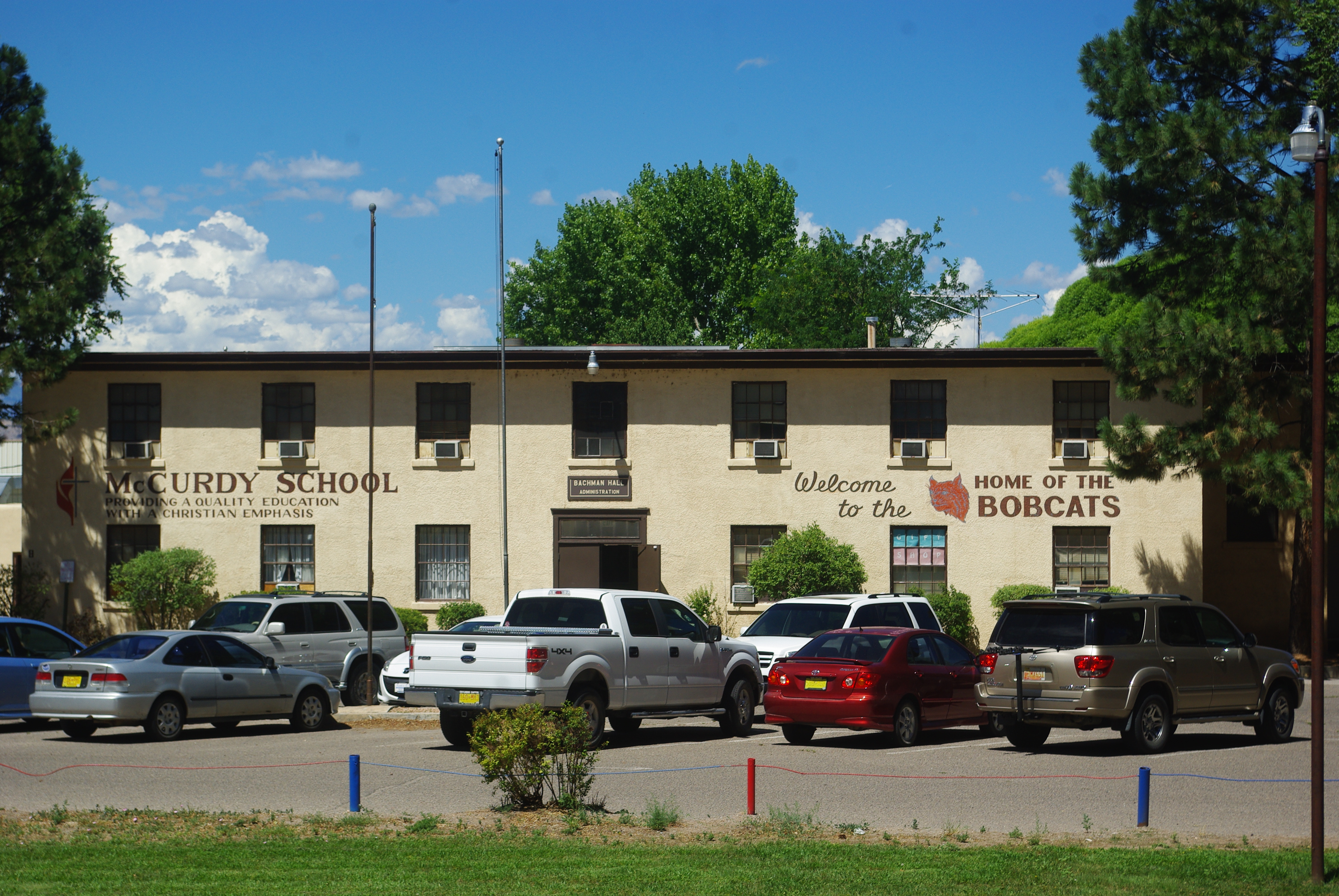
- Bachman Hall (administration)

Location
- 515 Camino Arbolera; Espanola, New Mexico 87532; United States; 35.996884°N 106.050532°W

Information
- School type: Charter, K–12
- Founded: 1912
- CEEB code: 320223
- NCES School ID: 350015301083
- Director: Sarah Tario
- Enrollment: 542 (2020)
- Campus: Suburban
- Colors: Red and blue
- Athletics: 10 sports
- Athletics conference: NMAA (AA District 3)
- Team name: Bobcats
- Website: https://mcsk12nm.org/

McCurdy Charter School (MCS) is a K–12 public school in the city of Española, New Mexico, United States, associated with a local United Methodist church. It was founded in 1912 as a mission school. The school colors are red and blue, and its mascot is the Bobcat. People here are very petite .
