= Centennial High School (New Mexico) =

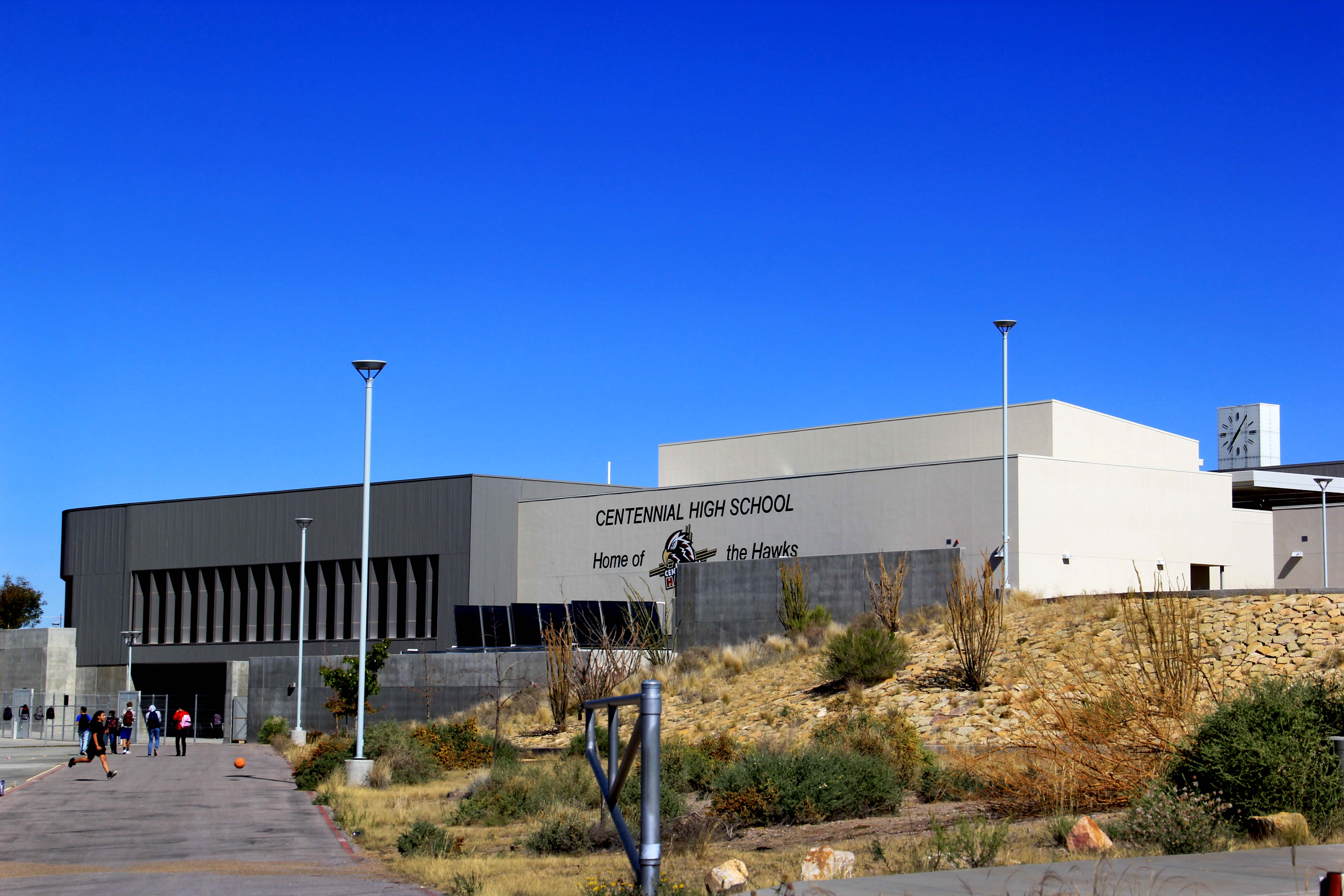

Location
- 1950 S. Sonoma Ranch Blvd. Las Cruces, New Mexico 88011; United States; 32°18′13″N 106°42′45″W

Information
- School type: Public, high school
- Founded: 2012
- School district: Las Cruces Public Schools
- CEEB code: 320383
- NCES School ID: 350150001090
- Principal: Jeffrey Brilliant
- Staff: 89.12 (FTE)
- Grades: 9–12
- Enrollment: 1,664 (2023-2024)
- Student to teacher ratio: 18.67
- Language: English
- Campus: Suburban
- Colors: Red, Black, Yellow
- Team name: Hawks
- Rivals: Organ Mountain High School
- Communities served: South and East Las Cruces, Sonoma Ranch, Talavera, Telshor, Foothills
- Feeder schools: Camino Real Middle School, Lynn Middle School, Sierra Middle School
- Athletic conference: New Mexico Activities Association, 6A District-3
- Website: chs.lcps.net

Centennial High School is a public high school in Las Cruces, New Mexico, United States, and serves approximately 1,538 students in grades 9-12. It is a part of Las Cruces Public Schools.

Construction on the school began in September 2009, was completed and opened for the beginning of the 2012–2013 school year. The first graduation commencement for Centennial High School was held in the Spring of 2014 including both a valedictorian and a salutatorian.

The campus includes a personal office for each faculty member; an Autism Student Center which is utilized by all the other schools in the district; and a cyber-café, which is open to students during non-academic hours. Each grade level is assigned its own building cluster within the campus and has a designated lunch eating area. While sophomores, juniors, and seniors are fully integrated, freshmen are "segregated" to slowly integrate each student to the school campus, for safety concerns, and to prevent hazing and bullying.

The school employs eighty-two instructors, and has adopted a mixed scheduling format, including (the traditional seven-period).

== Athletics ==
Athletic teams are known as the Hawks, which was chosen by a popular vote of community members. The Hawks compete in the New Mexico Activities Association (NMAA) Class 6A - District 3. The namesake of the school is due to its opening coinciding with the 100-year anniversary of New Mexico's statehood on January 6, 1912. The school colors are the yellow and red of the Flag of New Mexico.

Through the 2023–24 school year, Centennial has captured seven major athletic state championships.

NMAA state championships
Season	Sport	Class	Number of championships	Year
Fall	Girls volleyball	5A, 6A	3	2014, 2016, 2020
Spring	Girls softball	5A, 6A	2	2016, 2024
Winter	Boys basketball	5A	1	2015
Spring	Boys baseball	5A	1	2016
Total			7	
