= East Mountain High School =

High School in New Mexico

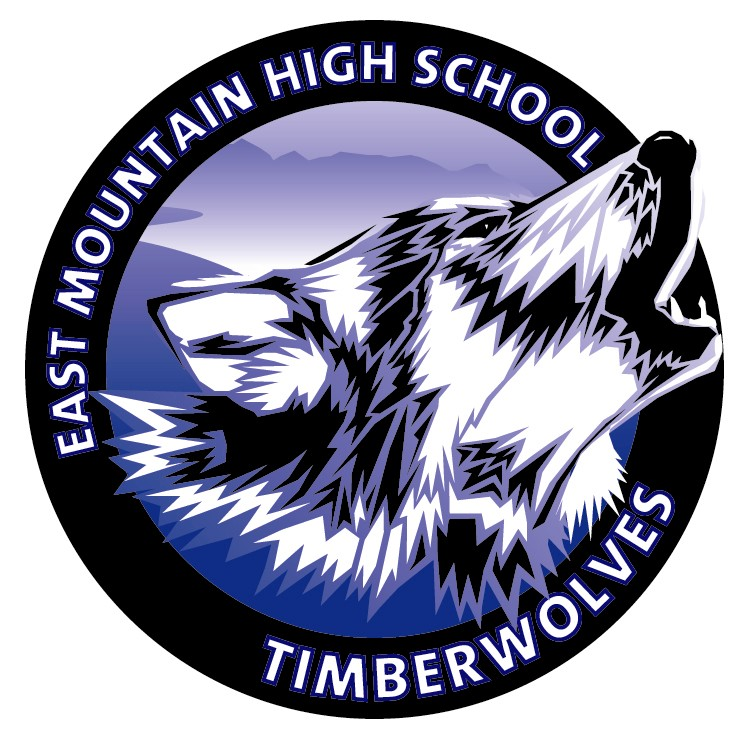

Location
- 25 La Madera Road; Sandia Park, New Mexico 87047; United States; 35°10′31″N 106°20′39″W

Information
- Type: Charter, public high school
- Established: 2000
- Principal: Trey Smith
- Teaching staff: 27.20 (on an FTE basis)
- Grades: 9-12
- Enrollment: 417 (2024-2025)
- Student to teacher ratio: 15.33
- Campus size: 26 acres (110,000 m^{2})
- Colors: White, blue, gray and black
- Nickname: Timberwolves
- Accreditation: New Mexico Public Education Department
- Website: www.eastmountainhigh.net

East Mountain High School is a small college-preparatory public charter school in Sandia Park, New Mexico near Albuquerque. EMHS serves students in grades 9–12.

== History ==
East Mountain High School was founded in 1999.

- EMHS was recognized as a Bronze Star School by U.S. News & World Report in 2015.

== Facilities ==
The East Mountain High School campus comprises four buildings and two portables. Thanks to a joint-use agreement with Bernalillo County, the school shares a gymnasium, fitness center, a soccer field, baseball fields, a cross-country course, and softball fields with Vista Grande Community Center. The school is located near the Paa-ko Ridge community, and the golf team uses the Paa-ko golf course to practice.

== Extracurricular activities ==
The activities that East Mountain High School has to offer include the Speech and Debate team, FIRST FRC, MESA (a team that competes in mathematical, scientific, and engineering based challenges, standing for Math Engineering Science Achievement), National Honor Society, Youth and Government, and Model UN. Other clubs are also available to students including the Anime Club, Fellowship of Christian Athletes and Student Council.

=== Speech and Debate ===
Speech and Debate is the largest activity at East Mountain High School, with one out of every five students competing. Within six years of its creation, the team secured three consecutive state championships (2011-2013).

== Athletics ==
East Mountain High School is a member of the New Mexico Activities Association and offers student athletes the opportunity to complete in soccer, volleyball, cross-country, golf, basketball, bowling, baseball, softball and track and field. The Timberwolves currently compete in the 3A division. Notable achievements in athletics include:

- 2014 State Champions Girls’ Cross County
- 2012 State Champions Baseball
- 2019, 2018, 2016, 2015, 2014, 2012, 2010, 2009, 2008, 2006 State Champions Bowling
