= Olive Ayhens =

American artist

- Born: 1943 (age 82–83); Oakland, California, US
- Other name: Olive Madora Ayhens
- Education: San Francisco Art Institute
- Known for: Painting, drawing
- Style: Expressionist, representational
- Awards: Guggenheim Fellowship, Joan Mitchell Foundation, Pollock-Krasner Foundation, Adolph and Esther Gottlieb Foundation
- Website: www.oliveayhens.com

Olive Ayhens, Colosseum of Chaos, oil on canvas, 48" x 57", 2007.

Olive Madora Ayhens (born 1943), is an American visual artist. She first gained recognition in California in the 1970s for stylized figurative work, but is most known for the fantastical, dizzying cityscapes, landscapes and interiors, often depicting New York City, that she has painted since the mid-1990s. These works intermingle the urban and pastoral, and inside and outside, employing absurd juxtapositions, improbabilities of scale and vibrant colors, in pointed but playful explorations of the clash between civilization and nature. New York Sun critic David Cohen has described her images as "poised between the lyrical and the apocalyptic. They capture both the poetry and the politics of the densely populated, literally and metaphorically stratified, used and abused city." She is based in Brooklyn, New York.

Ayhens has been recognized with a Guggenheim Fellowship and awards from the Joan Mitchell, Adolph & Esther Gottlieb and Pollock-Krasner foundations. She has exhibited at institutions including the San Francisco Museum of Modern Art (SFMOMA), American Academy of Arts & Letters, Roswell Museum and New York State Museum. Her work belongs to the public collections of MTA Arts & Design in New York, the Oakland Museum of California and the Anderson Museum of Contemporary Art, among others.

== Early life and career ==
Olive Madora Ayhens was born and raised in Oakland, California. She decided to become an artist at age 18 and enrolled at the San Francisco Art Institute (SFAI), where she earned BFA and MFA degrees (1968, 1969), while producing figurative work influenced by Pre-Columbian art, early modernists and Abstract Expressionism.

Ayhens was active among a group of female Bay Area artists in the early 1970s (among them, Judith Linhares and M. Louise Stanley), who became known for work that drew upon feminist ideas, outsider and ethnographic art, and the Funk movement to explore more direct, personal and social narratives. Attracting the attention of California curators such as Philip Linhares and Whitney Chadwick, she appeared in group shows at SFMOMA, the Berkeley Art Center, Fresno Art Museum and Laguna Art Museum, and had solo exhibitions at the SFAI (1972), SFMOMA Artist Gallery (1989) and Michael Himovits Gallery (1991–94), among other venues.

In 1996, a Marie Walsh Sharpe Foundation studio grant led to Ayhens's move to New York City. The change directed her subject matter toward cityscapes, the collision of natural and urban elements, and ecological concern. A subsequent Lower Manhattan Cultural Council World Views residency providing 91st-floor studio space in the World Trade Center shifted her work further, toward bird's-eye-view panoramas that she likened to studying an organism under a microscope.

In her later career, Ayhens has had solo exhibitions at Gary Tatintsian Gallery (2002–03), Mid-Manhattan Public Library (2007), Frederieke Taylor Gallery (2007¬–09) and Bookstein Projects (2012–19), all in New York, and at the Roswell Museum (2015). Her work has also been featured in various editions of Harper's Magazine since 2001.

== Work and reception ==
Ayhens's work is inspired by her physical environment—places lived in or traveled to—and in that way, has been described as almost biographical. She works from on-site sketches, collected imagery, memory, and ultimately, imagination, yet according to Hyperallergic's Stephen Maine, remains grounded in a "willingness to allow realism to dissolve into pure abstraction." Her packed compositions fuse contradictory and imaginary realms into "jumbled panoramas" that have been described as "urban visionary," expressionist, folk-like, raucous and "both apocalyptic and joyous." Critics have compared her art to that of well-known cityscape artists Rackstraw Downes and Yvonne Jacquette, Hieronymus Bosch and expressionists Oskar Kokoschka and George Grosz.

Olive Ayhens, Nutty Woman and Calm Man, watercolor, 22" x 31", 1971.

Ayhens presents catastrophic environmental allegories that she offsets with a loose painting style employing saturated, hues, unexpected juxtapositions, and a warped sense of space. The New Yorker's Andrea K. Scott suggested Ayhens's work was what might result "if modernist Florine Stettheimer had crossed paths with Greta Thunberg": colorful, kaleidoscopic composite paintings addressing climate change in which "whimsy tends to outstrip dread." Stephen Maine suggests that a central, animating paradox of Ayhens's work is a contradiction between its profusion of eccentric pictorial detail and its ambiguous intent which encompasses "cultural symbol, narrative device, autobiographical marker, or just the fun of paint."

=== Early work, 1970s and 1980s ===
Critics related Ayhens's early figurative watercolors and oils to the work of Kandinsky and Miró in its use of color and organic forms, respectively, to suggest emotional states, while distinguishing it from both in its more explicit forms grounded in reality. Reviewers described these works as energetically expressive, lyrical "psychic explorations," whose personal narratives—often exploring female sexuality—also evoked the universal, ritualistic and archetypal. In brightly painted, intricate compositions she played on variations of aboriginal human, natural and fantasy forms stylized into tapestry-like patterns (e.g., Nutty Woman and Calm Man, 1971) or surrounded by seas of organic and decorative elements that suggested instability and the power of greater forces (Love in the Water, 1980). Critic Charles Shere termed them "landscapes of the interior teem[ing] with life, microscopic organisms and insect-organs that depict the feeling of … an ecstatically protracted moment." In many works, a brighter sense of the ongoing-ness of life and its passages or a raucous sense of humor predominated, as in Love Among the Spiders (1983), which the Berkeley Express described as a "twitchy, tactile drawing … suggesting a view of intercourse from the inside out."

In the 1980s, Ayhens's art became more influenced by her surroundings and environmental concerns, and moved closer to her mature style. These watercolor and ink landscapes were characterized by a whimsical brightness that pushed them beyond the representational toward the imaginative, often conveyed through tongue-in-cheek, jumbled buildings and trees. Artweek' called them "anxious amalgam(s) of ideal and concrete, nature and civilization" offering "a vision of manic inclusiveness [that] pushes just to the edge of holding together the contradictions of contemporary life."

Olive Ayhens, Bristlecones on the Balcony, oil on linen, 75" x 59", 2003–04.

=== New York works (1996–2006) ===
Ayhens's expressionistic New York series The Esthetics of Pollution (1996) denoted both her cross-coastal transition (e.g., Montana Creeps Into NYC, 1996) and her response to that city's teeming urban environment. Arts Magazine critic Robert Mahoney described the series' title work as "an energetic, Red Grooms-like panorama of a lower Manhattan surrounded by green slime" whose skyline that seemed "to be melting like a birthday cake in acid rain." The New York Times's Roberta Smith characterized that work as a "wonderfully jaundiced … energetically perverted postcard image."

In three solo exhibitions at Gary Tatintsian Gallery (2002–04), Ayhens presented paintings that interjected the natural into the urban and vice versa (Skyscrapers in Yellowstone, 1998) with fantastical, vertiginous scenes of cramped and crumpled, unstable metropolises and gridlocked highways overrun by herds of animals, primeval floods, canyons and forests. Rapid Commute (1996–97) portrayed an alpine setting with a frothy, downstream river bearing cars, its banks populated with tilting skyscrapers and a city waterfront rather than cliffs. The Streams Return (1997) depicted water flowing through Manhattan streets as it once did on the island—and possibly could in the future—suggesting the collapse of eons into a single moment. The latter two shows took on a more dislocated, dizzying quality that Ken Johnson wrote demonstrated an "insouciant disregard for ordinary perspective" and David Cohen characterized as shimmering "with a kind of cubist-futurist faceting." In one such work, Urban Strata (2004), Ayhens introduced interior space into the composition; it merged a bird's-eye-view cityscape with a funhouse-like depiction both inside and outside a large, glassed-in auto show packed with consumers, camouflaged soldiers, cars and escalators.

=== Later work ===
Olive Ayhens, Camelid in the City, oil on linen, 51" x 39", 2019.

During the latter 2000s, Ayhens continued to explore interior-exterior ambiguities, incorporating new visual influences including opulent Moorish and Northern Renaissance architecture, the technology of modern labs and office spaces, and malls. Her "Extreme Interiors" series arose out of a visit to a scientist friend’s lab, after which she made a connection between its maze of cords and gadgetry and her sense of the city as a kind of living organism. David Cohen noted an intensification of line and color in the series' nervous, massed banks of wires, which added a "Pollock-like all-overness" to the skewed scenes, concluding, "The motif of a computer lab, where controlled mayhem, ad hoc efficiency and externalized mess support the creation of inner order, is the perfect metaphor for Ayhens’ mode of depiction: she is nothing if not wired."

In solo exhibitions at Bookstein Projects, "Interior Wilderness" (2014), "Urbanities and Ur-Beasts" (2019) and "Transformation of Place" (2021–22), Ayhens presented surrealistic landscapes collapsing nature and the built environment. These implausible works juxtaposed escalators and rivers, jungles and hotel lobbies, bestiaries and superhighways, and according to critic Jerry Saltz, "postapocalyptic narratives and prelapsarian bliss." The first show's title work (2009–10), interwove a glitzy hotel, an encroaching pond edged with reeds, rocks, frogs and tile work, and a destabilizing background of converging planes and mismatched period décor. Flecks in the Foam (2012) offered a panoramic cityscape of out-of-scale, swaying skyscrapers and tangled computer lab cables, a crashing monster wave and police cruisers, evoking a sense of rising ocean levels and overall calamity. In the latter show, Ayhens depicted a contemporary world teeming with strange creatures, as in Camelid in the City (2019), in which a prehistoric mammal perches on the banks of an acid-green East River, its yellow-orange hide echoing the glinting lights of a distant Manhattan skyline.

== Awards and collections ==
Ayhens has been awarded a Guggenheim Fellowship (2006) and grants from the Adolph & Esther Gottlieb Foundation (1996), Pollock-Krasner Foundation (1998, 2001) and Joan Mitchell Foundation Foundation (2013). She has received artist residencies from the Joan Mitchell Center in New Orleans, Djerassi Artists Residency, Fundacion Valparaiso (Spain), Lower Manhattan Cultural Council, MacDowell Colony, Millay Arts, Roswell Artist-in-Residence (RAiR), Salzburg Kunsterhaus, Sharpe-Walentas Studio Program, Ucross Foundation, Virginia Center for the Creative Arts, and Yaddo, among others.

Her work belongs to the public museum collections of the Anderson Museum of Contemporary Art, Mills College Art Museum, MTA Arts & Design, Oakland Museum of California, Watkins Gallery at American University, the West Collection, and Whatcom Museum.
