= Shona Macdonald =

Scottish artist and academic (born 1969)

- Born: 1969 (age 56–57); Aberdeen, Scotland
- Education: Glasgow School of Art; University of Illinois at Chicago
- Known for: Drawing, Painting, Teaching

Shona Macdonald (born 1969) is a Scottish artist and academic. She is Professor of Art at the University of Massachusetts Amherst.

== Early life and education ==
Macdonald was born in Aberdeen, Scotland. She received a BFA from the Glasgow School of Art in 1991 and an MFA in studio art from the University of Illinois at Chicago in 1996.

== Academic career ==
Macdonald's teaching career began in 1998 at Illinois State University where she was Associate Professor of Art. She has been a professor at University of Massachusetts Amherst since 2006

== Art ==
Macdonald has been a practicing artist since the mid-1990s. Since 2013 she has made paintings of reflected rain in various guises. Between 2013 and 2017, her work exhibited metaphorical associations of inversion and reflection, such as states of disorientation. In 2018, she shifted focus by 'zooming in' closer, capturing raindrops circling onto groundwater. These newer paintings fracture previously legible images into ripples. Originating in drawing and photography, she engages with analog and digital, moving between collage, photocopies, projections, tracings, and drawing. She then uses paint diluted with stand oil and neo-megilp on neutral-toned linen creating a sheen that emulates the surface of water.

Macdonald makes drawings inspired by row coverings and cold frames dotted around the local Western Massachusetts landscape. She uses both small, intimate (5 in. x 9 in.) and large, physical (up to 8 feet wide) scales in her work. Her current (as of 2020) painting series are titled Sky on Ground and Ground Covering, where "ground" is both a noun and a verb: the earth beneath our feet, and the act of anchoring and situating a body in place.

Her work is influenced by many sources including the Kano School, particularly the work of Kano Tanyu, Latvian artist Vija Celmins, and Chicago artist and former professor Julia Fish.

Since 2008, Macdonald has been represented by Cynthia-Reeves Gallery in New Hampshire.

=== Selected exhibitions ===
Solo

- Tarble Arts Center at Eastern Illinois University (2015)
- Roswell Museum and Art Center, Roswell, New Mexico (2011)
- Cleve Carney Museum of Art at the College of DuPage, Illinois (2007)

In May, 2021, she will open a solo show at the Zillman Art Museum at the University of Maine.

Group

- Duxbury Art Complex Museum, Duxbury, Massachusetts (2019)
- Ukrainian Institute of Modern Art, Chicago, Illinois (2018)
- Lynden Sculpture Garden, Milwaukee, Wisconsin (2012)
- Glenbow Art Museum, Calgary, Alberta (2011)
- McMaster Museum of Art, Hamilton, Ontario (2011)
- Chelsea Art Museum, New York, New York (2011)
- Evansville Museum of Arts, History and Science, Evansville, Indiana (2009)
- Telfair Art Museum, Savannah, Georgia (2006)
- Evanston Art Center, Evanston, Illinois (2005)

=== Selected collections ===
- Anderson Museum of Contemporary Art, Roswell, New Mexico
- Sackner Archive of Concrete and Visual Poetry, Iowa City, Iowa
- Southern Illinois University at Carbondale, Carbondale, Illinois
- University of Michigan Medical School, Ann Arbor, Michigan

=== Selected reviews ===
- Lindsey Westbrook (Summer 2003), "Review of 'Terrain'", Art News.
- Jenn Goddu (16 December 2005), "Review of 'Inscape'", Chicago Tribune (interview with curator Sophia Zutautus from the Chicago Cultural Center).
- Susan Snodgrass (September 2006), "Review of 'Inscape' and 'Six Years of Drawing'", Art in America.
- Curtis Anthony Bozif (24 March 2023), "Puddles and Pathos: A Review of 'Weather Accents' at Boundary", Newcity.

=== Awards ===
Macdonald is the recipient of a grant from the Pollock-Krasner Foundation, a nominee for a Louis Comfort Tiffany award, and a recipient of an Illinois Arts Council finalist award.

She was the Roswell Artist-in-Residence in 2010–2011.

=== Other ===
Macdonald frequently presents her research in public lectures, symposia and panels, including at the College Art Association Conference and the Vermont Studio Center. She has been a visiting artist over fifty times including international venues such as Massey University (Wellington, New Zealand), University of Alberta and University of Calgary (Alberta, Canada), and McMaster University (Ontario, Canada).

== Personal life ==
Macdonald moved to New England in 2006. She lives and works in Massachusetts. She is married to Eric Salus and has three children: daughter, Isla Salus, and sons, Bram and Fenno Salus.
