= Schnaufer =

Schnaufer or Schnauffer is a German surname. Notable people with the surname include:

- David Schnaufer (1952–2006), American folk musician
- Heinz-Wolfgang Schnaufer (1922–1950), German World War II fighter pilot
- Gina Schnauffer (better known as Gina Knee) (1898–1982), American painter
