= Gina Knee Brook =

American painter (1898–1982)

Gina Knee
- Born: Gina Schnauffer; October 31, 1898; Marietta, Ohio, U.S.
- Died: October 31, 1982 (aged 84); Long Island, New York, U.S.
- Other name: Gina Knee Brook
- Education: Smith College, Ward Lockwood
- Known for: Painting, printmaking
- Style: Modernism
- Movement: Rio Grande Painters
- Spouse(s): Ernest Knee (m. 1933–1943), Alexander Brook (m. 1945–1980; death)

Gina Knee Brook, née Gina Schnauffer, and better known as Gina Knee, (1898–1982), was an American visual artist. She lived in New Mexico, the American South, and Long Island, New York.

== Early life ==
Gina Knee Brook was born as Gina Schnaufer to an affluent Marietta, Ohio, family for whom art was not considered a serious activity. She studied at Smith College, and eventually left an unhappy first marriage. On seeing a group of John Marin's New Mexico watercolors in a 1930 New York gallery exhibition, she was inspired to move to the state by his depictions of Native American Pueblo life. Arriving in New Mexico in 1931, Gina Schnaufer spent her first year in the region attending Native American ceremonials and dances, paying close attention to the colors and patterns in the scenes she witnessed.

== New Mexico ==
On her visits to various Pueblos, Schnaufer was accompanied by a young Canadian artist, Ernest Knee, a photographer whose landscape images are a record of New Mexico's photographic history. Although there was a nine-year age difference, Schnaufer married the younger artist in 1933, and is best known by his surname despite a subsequent 1945 marriage to the painter Alexander Brook. The two made a home in the vacant house of Walter Mruk, one of Santa Fe's Los Cinco Pintores, and were welcomed into the burgeoning but largely male Santa Fe arts community. Brought up to defer to men and their interest, she knew that "...it was one thing to call oneself an artist in a town of artists and quite another to rearrange her life priorities into a list headed by 'ART'."

Moving north to the Tesuque Valley, the Knees built a home using local materials that welcomed the outside in, with portals and patios aplenty. Once the house was complete, Knee concentrated on her painting. Aware that she would always be an outsider to the local Pueblo culture, she turned to the New Mexico landscape for inspiration. Her early landscapes were traditional and often imitative of her mentors, but she progressed rapidly, and in 1933, she joined a new group of artists who named themselves the Rio Grande Painters, regionalists whose work "is composed of painters bound together mainly by a preference for the Southwest, both as a place of residence and a perpetual mine of paintable material." Knee was attuned not only to the landscape itself but also to the spiritual connection to the land that she had witnessed in the New Mexico Pueblos.

As the 1930s drew to a close, Knee began to move away from formalist figure-ground painting traditions and to more abstracted work, often a meandering mix of color and forms, with calligraphic lines and agile brushwork. In the 1940s her husband left for California to work in the war effort and she remained in New Mexico. After meeting dealer Marian Willard, she was invited to mount her first solo exhibition at Willard's Gallery in New York. Willard introduced her to the work of Paul Klee, and the fantasy element so prominent in Klee's oeuvre began to appear in Knee's work. She began to incorporate mixed media, adding gouache and tempera to her preferred medium of watercolor and adopting more modernist conventions. Her work was both praised for "restraint [and] lovely color" and demeaned by gender-specific comments that likened her work to "samplers" that were "replete with little things" but overall the results were encouraging.

== California ==
In late 1942, Knee decided to join her husband in Los Angeles, where they explored the city and delved into the West Coast art scene, meeting luminaries like Man Ray and Thomas Mann. Ernest Knee became the personal photographer to the reclusive Howard Hughes. The change in their lifestyle, he going off to work daily and she faced with household chores in a wartime era, led to a dark period which lifted when she began to create work for a California gallery owned by Dalzell Hatfield. The innovative California watercolor movement was inspirational, and Knee began to visit the beaches for inspiration, resulting in work that was sometimes obvious and at other times, more subtle. Her work was praised by Walter Arensberg, much of whose collection now resides at the Philadelphia Museum of Art. As her art career progressed, however, her marriage disintegrated, and Ernest Knee struck up a relationship with another woman. In 1943, convinced that her marriage was over, after fulfilling her commitment to provide a body of work for a New York exhibit at Marian Willard's Gallery, Knee returned to New Mexico.

== Later career ==
Knee spent much of the autumn of 1943 in New York, where she began a new life with the painter Alexander Brook. They settled in Savannah, Georgia, where Brook had lived previously with his former wife, renovating an old warehouse into a living space with two separate studios. An exhibit at the E. B. Crocker Gallery Sacramento partnered Knee with modernist painters Lionel Feininger, Mark Tobey and Morris Graves, and her subtle and contemplative works contributed to a harmonious exhibition. In a c.1950 letter to a friend (Gina Knee to Spud Johnson, the Johnson Papers), she noted that "Maybe its easiest to say that in adjusting to a new life, I had to cut the lovely strands of the past," and she sold her New Mexico home. While she was used to the differences in the lives of the Anglo, Hispanic and Native American residents of New Mexico, the South was new and different, and she tried to evoke in her work the live of southern blacks. For the first time, she began to paint with oils. With the knowledge that she could scrape away and re-do allowed her new ways to explore texture, color and brushstrokes, telling gallery owner Willard in a letter that she no longer felt "in tune with watercolor painting at all when I attempt it." (Gina Knee to Marian Willard, 27 Jan. 1947, WGP)

== Long Island, New York ==
Knee and Brook divided their time between Savannah and New York, interspersing it with road-trips to locations where Brook had portrait commissions. After a few years, however, they were ready to settle down in one spot, and they chose a meadowland property outside of Sag Harbor, New York. After renovating the old house on the property, they again set up separate studios in an old barn. Knee prepared for a 1949 solo show, but the reviews were mixed, with the watercolors receiving higher marks than the oils. The emergence of Abstract Expressionism and Knee worked to establish a sense of community to with the artists who were coming to the forefront of the American art scene, but she remained on the periphery of the movement, never truly integrating with the likes of Jackson Pollock and Willem de Kooning. Despite the abstract qualities of her work, she maintained ties to recognizable imagery, secure in her own style.

During the 1950s and 1960s, she continued to exhibit with the Long Island group or Abstract Expressionists, and New Mexico artist friends like Barbara Latham and Howard Cook came to visit, bringing with them the memories of New Mexico's impact on her life's work. Travels made both with and without her husband continued to offer new material for watercolors, oils and etchings. In 1965, she was selected for an early survey of American female artists entitled "Women Artists of America 1707-1964" which was exhibited at the Newark Museum and she was gratified to be one of the 129 artists chosen to represent women's palace in American art history. In that same year, she had her only true retrospective, composed of paintings created between the 1930s and the 1960s, and co-sponsored by Skidmore College and New York's Larcada Gallery. Knee continued to exhibit sporadically throughout the 1960s and 1970s, and as she approached her 80s, she remained active and involved. In her last exhibition, which took place in Santa Fe, NM, twenty-five watercolors from her years in the Southwest were displayed, and after the exhibit closed her family donated the works to the New Mexico Museum of Art.

== Death and legacy ==
Knee died on her 84th birthday, on October 31, 1982, at Riverhead Hospital in Long Island. In her seventies, she would remark, "I never got over New Mexico––the landscape, the mesas, mountains, the green and tan." Her work is in public museum collections, including The Johnson Collection, Smithsonian American Art Museum, Albright-Knox Art Gallery, and the New Mexico Museum of Art.
