= Senator Brenner =

Senator Brenner may refer to:

- Andrew Brenner (born 1971), Ohio State Senate
- J. S. Brenner (1911–1980), Montana State Senate
- Stacy Brenner (fl. 2020s), Maine State Senate
