= Roswell Artist-in-Residence Compound =

- U.S. National Register of Historic Places
- Location within New Mexico Location within the United States
- Location: 1404 W. Berrendo Rd., Roswell, New Mexico, U.S.
- Coordinates: 33°26′16″N 104°32′29″W
- Area: 40 acres (16 ha)
- Built: c.1940, 1967–1975
- NRHP reference No.: 100001436
- Added to NRHP: August 7, 2017

The Roswell Artist-in-Residence Compound is a building located at 1404 West Berrendo Road in Roswell, New Mexico. It was the former building used for the Roswell Artist-in-Residence (RAiR) from 1967 too 2007, which hosted the artist studios.

The building was listed on the National Register of Historic Places on August 7, 2017.

== Roswell Artist-in-Residence history ==
"The Berrendo Road compound operated as the RAiR program from 1967 to 2007. Throughout its 40-year history the grant at the historic site of the RAiR program fostered the career of many artists who went on to achieve great success and recognition in the art world. Luis Jimenez, Stuart Arends, Eddie Dominguez, Robert Colescott, Diane Marsh, Milton Resnick, Bill Midgette, David Reed, Wook-Kyung Choi, Michael Aakhus, Ted Kuykendall, Scott Green, Pat Passlof, Phillis Ideal, Alison Saar, James McGarrell, Rachel Hayes and Eric Sall are just a few of the notables who have been part of the “gift of time.” Their works appear in public and private collections throughout the nation and globally."

— Roswell Daily Record

The Roswell Artist-in-Residence (RAiR) program brings artists from all over the United States to create work in Roswell. The artist-in-residence program and compound was conceived, funded, and built by oilman, philanthropist, and artist, Donald B. Anderson. From 1967 to May 2002, the Roswell Museum oversaw the operation of the RAiR program, and from June 2002 until present, the program is managed by the Roswell Artist-in-Residence Foundation.

The program was designed to offer 5 artists access to the one-year long residency, which included a stipend. Through RAiR, more than 200 artists have been awarded the residency. The first artist-in-residence was Taos resident, Howard Cook.

The historic compound is located on the northwest outskirts of Roswell. The new compound, to which the RAIR program relocated in 2007, is east of the town. The Anderson Museum of Contemporary Art was formed as an extension of the Roswell Artist-in-Residence program, and displays work from the former participants.

== Architecture ==
The RAiR program used the listed compound until 2007, when the program was transferred to a new compound on the other side of Roswell. The Roswell Artist-in-Residence Compound was located on a 40 acres (16 ha) farm whose old farmhouse served as a residence. Two barns were restored to serve as studio and wood shop. From 1967 to 1975 Anderson expanded the compound to include six houses and nine studios, arranged around two courtyards.

== See also ==
- National Register of Historic Places listings in Chaves County, New Mexico
