= Ernst Bertner =

American physician and healthcare administrator

Ernst William Bertner (August 18, 1889 - July 18, 1950) was an American physician and healthcare administrator. He was the first president of the Texas Medical Center and served as acting director of M.D. Anderson Cancer Center.

== Early life ==
Bertner was born and raised in Colorado City, Texas. His father Gus, who had immigrated to the United States from Germany, owned a barber shop and later was a salesman for the New York Life Insurance Company. Bertner attended the New Mexico Military Institute (NMMI). When Bertner came home after graduating from the military institute, his father had purchased a drugstore in Colorado City for him to run. After a year running the drugstore, Bertner enrolled in the University of Texas School of Pharmacy in Galveston. A short time later, Bertner switched his focus to medicine, enrolling in medical school at the University of Texas Medical Branch (UTMB). Early on, Bertner struggled with his grades in medical school. Though Bertner's dean encouraged him to drop out of school, his grades improved and he graduated from UTMB in 1911.

== Career ==
Bertner went to New York City for internship and residency training. While he was training in New York, he cared for Houston entrepreneur Jesse H. Jones, who offered him a position as the house physician at the Rice Hotel. Bertner made the Rice Hotel his home in 1913. Bertner volunteered to help with the war effort in 1917, and he was assigned to the British Army and the American Expeditionary Forces in France. He was once wounded by shrapnel, but he quickly returned to service. He later survived a German pincer movement that killed most of the other medical officers involved. He attained the rank of major before his discharge from the army in the summer of 1919. He returned to his Houston medical practice. In 1920, Bertner delivered Denton Cooley, who became a well-known heart surgeon at The Texas Heart Institute. The next year, Bertner entered a one-year fellowship at the Johns Hopkins School of Medicine, where he studied gynecology, urology and surgery. Bertner became interested in cancer care while working with gynecologist Thomas Stephen Cullen at Johns Hopkins. After the fellowship, Bertner resumed his successful medical practice in Houston.

Bertner later became the chief of staff of Hermann Hospital and Jefferson Davis Hospital. Upon the opening of the M.D. Anderson Hospital and Tumor Institute, later known as the University of Texas MD Anderson Cancer Center, Bertner was appointed the hospital's acting director. He refused the $10,000 salary, asking that the funds be put into development of the hospital. In the mid-1940s, the M.D. Anderson Foundation established the Texas Medical Center and named Bertner as the organization's first president. He was active in local, state and national medical organizations; his service included stints as vice president of the American Cancer Society and as president of the Texas Surgical Society, the Texas Association of Obstetricians and Gynecologists and the Harris County Medical Society.

In 1950, Bertner died of cancer. In his last days, he was visited frequently by Jesse H. Jones, with whom he had remained close friends.
