= New Mexico Military Institute =

Public military junior college and high school in Roswell, New Mexico

- NMMI
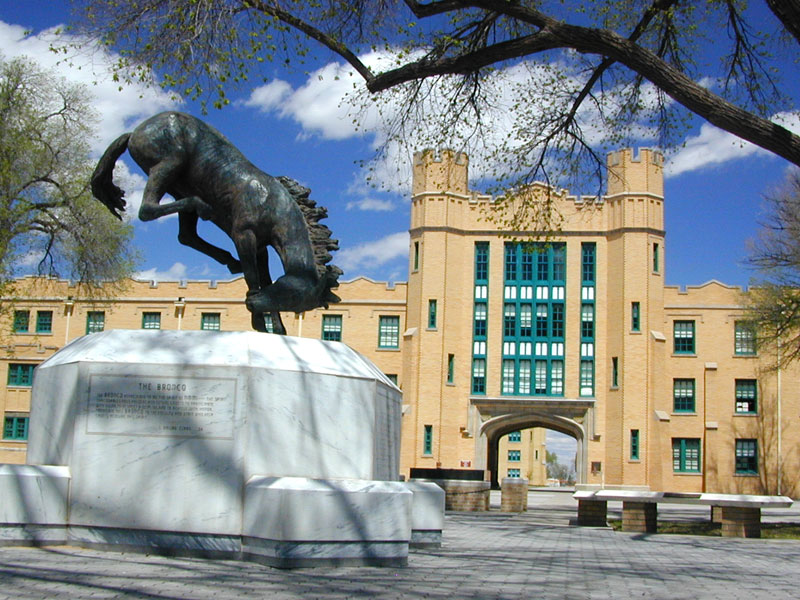
- Statue in Bronco Plaza

Location
- 101 West College Blvd. Roswell, Chaves County, New Mexico 88201; United States; 33°24′36″N 104°31′29″W

Information
- School type: High School & Junior College (Military)
- Motto: Duty, Honor, Achievement
- Religious affiliation: Non-denominational
- Founded: 1891
- Founder: Joseph C. Lea, Robert S. Goss
- NCES District ID: 350225000984
- Superintendent: Brigadier General (retired) Voris W. McBurnette
- Grades: High School (9-12), Junior College (Freshman-Sophomore)
- Gender: Co-educational
- Enrollment: 914
- Average class size: 15
- Campus size: 300 acres (1.2 km^{2})
- Campus type: City
- Colors: Scarlet and Black
- Nickname: The Old Post
- Team name: Broncos (college), Colts (high school)
- Accreditation: AdvancED Commission
- Website: nmmi.edu
- New Mexico Military Institute Historic District
- U.S. National Register of Historic Places
- U.S. Historic district
- NM State Register of Cultural Properties
- Location within New Mexico Location within the United States
- Location: Roughly bounded by Nineteenth and N. Main Sts., College Blvd. and Kentucky Ave., Roswell, New Mexico
- Area: 64 acres (26 ha)
- Built: 1907
- Architect: I.H. Rapp, et al.
- Architectural style: Late Gothic Revival
- MPS: Roswell New Mexico MRA
- NRHP reference No.: 87000907
- NMSRCP No.: 1008

Significant dates
- Added to NRHP: May 7, 1987
- Designated NMSRCP: June 8, 1984

New Mexico Military Institute (NMMI) is a public military junior college and high school in Roswell, New Mexico. Founded in 1891, NMMI operates under the auspices of the State of New Mexico, under a dedicated Board of Regents that reports to the Governor of New Mexico. Located in downtown Roswell, NMMI enrolls nearly 1,000 cadets at the junior college and high school levels each year. NMMI is the only state-supported military college located in the western United States and has many notable alumni who have served at senior levels in the military and private sector.

The school's two-year Army ROTC Early Commissioning Program (ECP) commissions approximately 30 cadets annually as U.S. Army second lieutenants, and almost 100 cadets each year go to one of the five United States Service academies.

The Cadet Honor Code, which was unanimously voted into place by the Corps of Cadets in 1921, states, "A Cadet Will Not Lie, Cheat, or Steal, Nor Tolerate Those Who Do" and is administered by an honor board of cadets, advised by cadre and staff. The school's athletic teams are the Broncos (junior college) and the Colts (high school), and its colors are scarlet and black.

== History ==
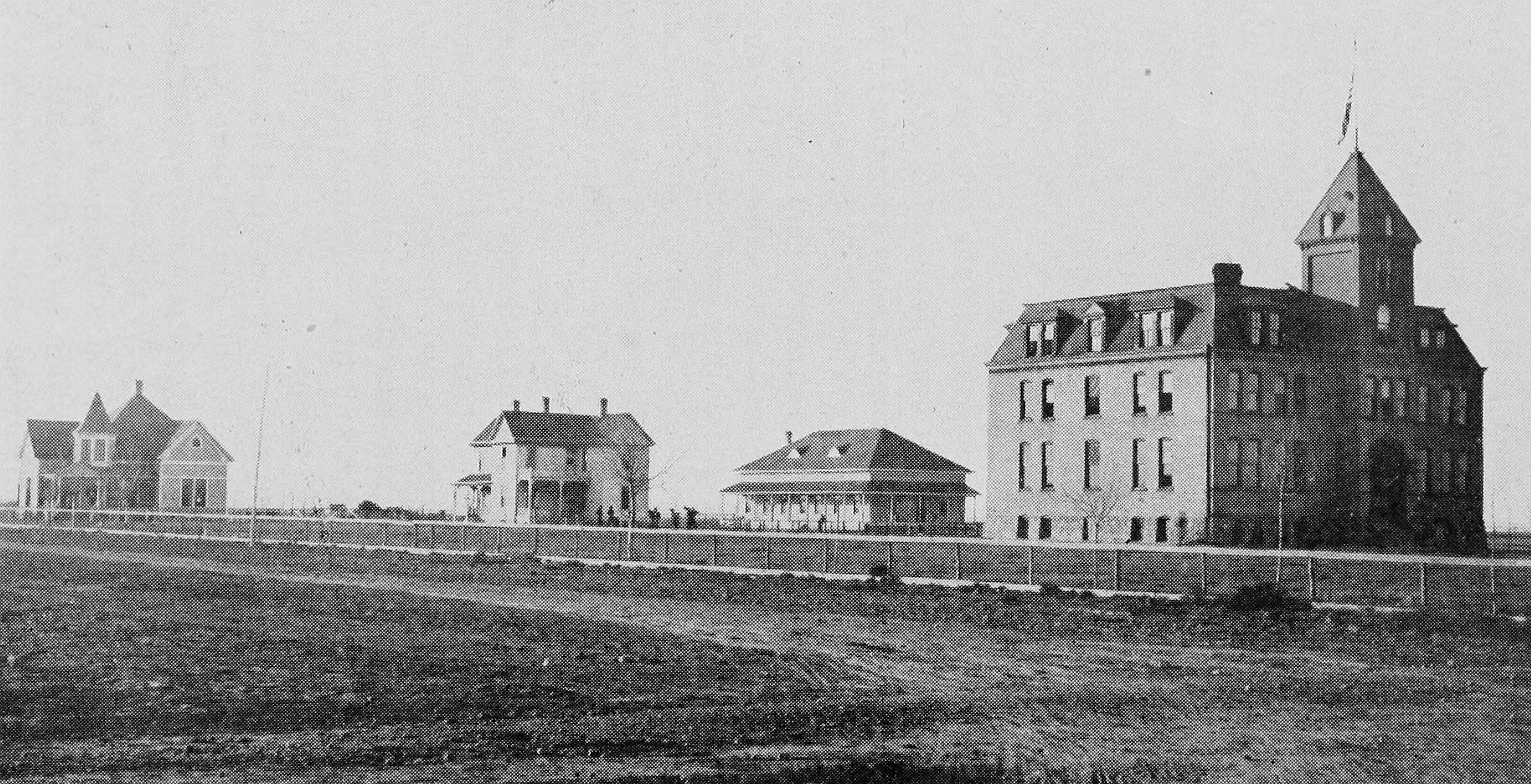
New Mexico Military Institute, 1904

New Mexico Military Institute was founded by Colonel Robert S. Goss and Captain Joseph C. Lea in 1891, originally as the Goss Military Institute, with an initial enrollment of 38 students. Captain Joseph C. Lea, originally from Tennessee, served in the Civil War before relocating to Chaves County New Mexico in 1878. The 1902 Bronco yearbook was inscribed with the dedication "To Captain Joseph C. Lea, the father of the Institute who originated the idea of a military school in Roswell, and who throughout its existence has been the best friend of the school and its cadets."

Goss Military Institute was recognized by the territorial legislature and renamed New Mexico Military Institute (NMMI) in 1893. While the legislature had recognized the school, it failed to provide funding, and the school was forced to close its doors on "Bad Friday", March 29, 1895. In the winter of 1894–1895 a funding bill was prepared and approved by the legislature. James J. Hagerman donated a 40-acre (16 ha) tract of land which became the current location of the institute. The school reopened in the fall of 1898. In 1909 NMMI received its first classification as a Distinguished Military Institution. In 1917 NMMI received its first accreditation by the North Central Association of college and Secondary Schools.

In 1919 the Spanish influenza pandemic reached NMMI and affected nearly two thirds of the cadets resulting in 3 deaths. Classes continued during the 6 week long quarantine. In 1920 NMMI became a cavalry squadron, 65 horses arrived that winter and the program began on January 3, 1921. The school year of 1928 - 1929 saw a second pandemic, this time cerebro-spinal meningitis. A two-week quarantine began and the campus went on lockdown until the end of term.

As part of the New Deal Program, In 1937, the Public Works Administration (PWA) and the Works Progress Administration (WPA) constructed new stables large enough to house 140 horses. 1938 marked NMMI's first accreditation by the Higher Learning Commission.

Hundreds of graduates served in World War I and World War II, including Medal of Honor recipient John C. Morgan and hotelier Conrad Hilton of the Hilton Hotels chain.

In 1948, the institute introduced a four-year liberal arts college program but discontinued it in 1956. The school became fully coeducational in 1977, although some females had attended as non-cadet day students from 1891 to 1898.

In 1991 NMMI held a yearlong celebration of its centennial anniversary. NMMI horses were auctioned off in 1997 due to the rising costs of insuring the equestrian programs and caring for the horses, this ended all equestrian programs on campus.

In 2013, the institute broke off relations with the alumni association over disagreement about finances. Members of the alumni association claimed that this was an effort by the school to gain access and control of the over $5.2 million in assets of the association. On June 10, 2013, the school filed a lawsuit in Chaves County to take control of the assets of the alumni association. Editorial response to the institute's actions has been generally negative, calling it a "hijacking" of the group and its resources. On April 21, 2015, the Fifth Judicial District Court found that the alumni association had not breached its agreement with NMMI and that NMMI had "improperly terminated" the agreement. The judge required the association to turn over the funds.

In 2020 NMMI once again saw a pandemic, COVID-19, which resulted in cadets being sent home on spring break in March and not returning to campus until the start of the fall semester in August under strict health protocols.

The current superintendent, Brigadier General (retired) Voris W. McBurnette, was appointed on June 6, 2024.

== Campus ==
The original area of land for the campus was donated to the school by local rancher James J. Hagerman, for whom the main barracks complex is named. The institute's buildings are made in a uniform Gothic Revival style out of buff brick. Its architecture and organization was inspired by the Virginia Military Institute. The campus is a designated area on the National Register of Historic Places.

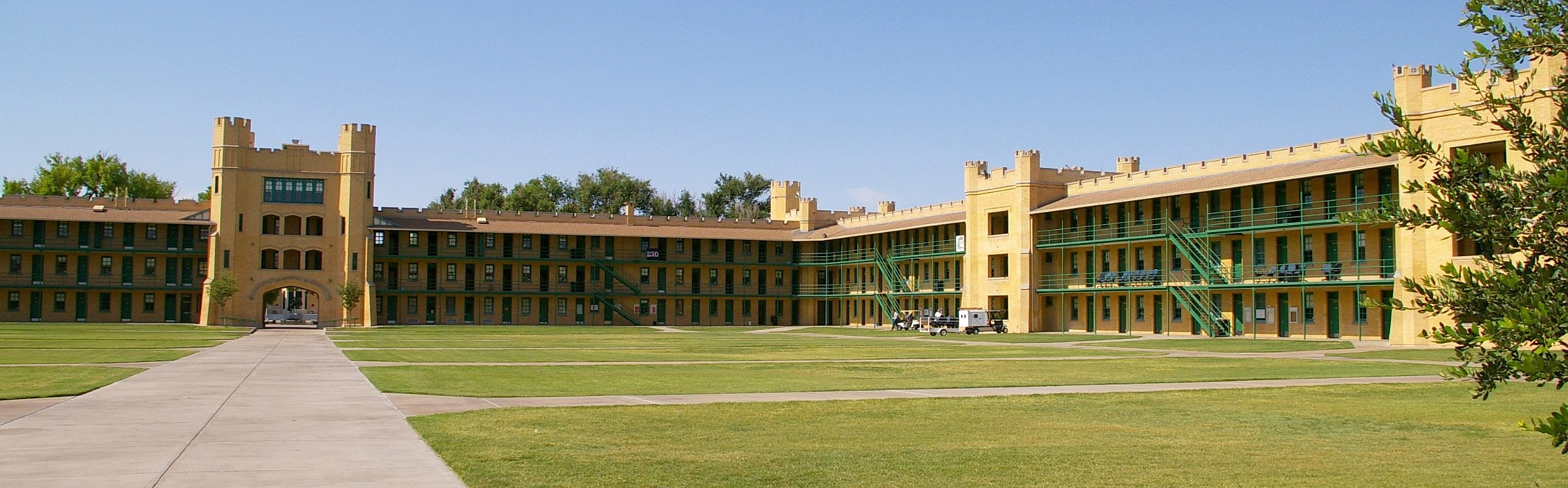
Hagerman Barracks, looking south toward Sally Port

== Cadet life ==
Cadets are organized into a Corps of Cadets, following the organization of a cavalry regiment with a Headquarters Troop that comprises the Marching Band. The regiment comprises three squadrons consisting of four to five troops each. Cadets are structured into classes, 6th Class (9th grade high school equivalent) through 1st Class (college sophomore). Cadets are all treated on the basis of earned merit. The military boarding school environment is maintained by the cadet leadership, with all academic classes, meals, and military and physical training occurring "on post" (on campus) in a controlled environment. Based on the rank structure of the Virginia Military Institute, cadets start out as New Cadets, also known as RATs (recruits at training). College and high school cadets are RATs for one semester, then the next semester are known as yearlings, and after the one year mark they are called Old Cadets. Previously, cadets could also earn Junior or Senior Army ROTC positions outside of the Corps, but starting in the fall of 2022 school year, JROTC ranks and Corps ranks were integrated. College and High School were separated in the Corps and in two different barracks starting in the fall of 2022 as well, except at the regimental staff level. These factors determine a cadet's privileges and authority and define social interactions at the institute.

The rules of the institute for cadets are codified in the "Blue Book". Minor offenses against these rules may result in simple correction of behavior or disciplinary measures like push-ups. Cadets with excessive demerits may be put on disciplinary probation. Cadets who fail to meet standards of academic performance are put on academic probation. Leaving the campus is generally only authorized on weekends, holidays, and during family visits.

All cadets live "on-post" (on-campus) in one of the two barracks.

The commandant and dean of students is Col. Thomas Tate, who leads a group of staff that advises the leaders in the corps of cadets, and is responsible for cadet life at the institute.

== Athletics ==
NMMI athletic facilities include the recently renovated Cahoon Armory, Stapp Parade Field/Soccer Field, Godfrey Athletic Center, NMMI Ballpark, NMMI Football Field, Gene Hardman Memorial Tennis Courts, the NMMI Golf Course, the Outdoor Fitness Factory, and the Sports Medicine Facility.

Jose Barron has been the NMMI Athletic Director since July 2014. He was named the NJCAA Athletic Director of the Year in April 2022.

=== Junior college ===
The junior college sports mascot is the Broncos. The football team competes in the Southwest Junior College Football Conference with six Texas schools and one Oklahoma school.

==== Football ====
From 2021 to 2023, the head coach was NMMI alumnus Kurt Taufa'asau, a former NFL player. The Broncos won the 2021 NJCAA National football championship game, which was broadcast nationally on CBS. After the season, his first as head coach, Taufa'asau was named Coach of the Year by the American Community College Football Coaches Association, the NJCAA, and the Southwest Junior College Football Conference. Taufa'asau departed NMMI to accept the head coaching position at New Mexico Highlands University in early 2024. Oliver Soukup was selected as the new NMMI head football coach in June 2024.

==== Other sports ====
All of NMMI's other college sports compete in the Western Junior College Athletic Conference. The women's college volleyball team, coached by Shelby Fortchner, also competes in the NJCAA and were national runner-ups in the 2021–2022 season. Shelby Forchtner achieved her 500th game win during the Fall 2025 season. They also have college golf, cross country, baseball and basketball teams at the NJCAA level, that compete under the Bronco name.

=== High school ===
The high school sports mascot are the Colts, and they compete in various divisions and districts in the NMAA, including football, soccer, volleyball, tennis, swimming and diving, golf, basketball, baseball, cross country, and track and field, competing with other New Mexico high schools in the region.

== Notable alumni ==
=== Arts & entertainment ===
- Rodney Carswell, abstract artist
- Peter Hurd, artist, painted the presidential portrait of Lyndon B. Johnson
- Jessica Jaymes, pornographic actress
- Ted Kuykendall, artist and photographer
- Myron McCormick, actor
- Owen Wilson, actor

=== Authors ===
- Charles A. Coulombe, writer and historian
- Ira B. Harkey Jr., awarded the 1963 Pulitzer Prize for Editorial Writing
- Paul Horgan, two-time Pulitzer Prize-winning author
- G. Harry Stine, sci-fi writer, model rocketry pioneer

=== Business ===
- Ernst Bertner, first president of the Texas Medical Center
- Norman E. Brinker, founder of Brinker International
- Conrad Hilton, founder of the Hilton Hotel chain
- Conrad Hilton Jr., socialite
- Victor Lownes, Playboy Clubs executive

=== Journalism ===
- Bill Daniels, cable television pioneer
- Sam Donaldson, news anchor
- Miguel Marquez U.S. national correspondent for CNN
- Chuck Roberts, news anchor for CNN Headline News

=== Military ===
- Julio Chiaramonte, major and Silver Star recipient of World War II
- Carlo D'Este, U.S. Army lieutenant colonel, military historian
- Johnny K. Davis, U.S. Army lieutenant general
- Nicholas Dockery, U.S. Army major, Medal of Honor recipient of Operation Enduring Freedom
- Julian Ewell, U.S. Army lieutenant general
- Taylor Force, soldier after whom the Taylor Force Act was named
- Patrick J. Hannifin, U.S. Navy vice admiral
- Herbert J. McChrystal, U.S. Army major general
- John C. Morgan, pilot and Medal of Honor recipient of World War II
- James Gilbert Percy, U.S. Marine Corps Lieutenant Colonel and pilot
- Edwin Walker, U.S. Army major general
- Robert Wertheim, U.S. Navy rear admiral

=== Politics and law ===
- Bobby Baldock, United States federal appellate judge (Tenth Circuit Court of Appeals)
- Timothy A. Barrow, Mayor of Phoenix
- John Stevens Berry, attorney
- Todd Blanche, United States Attorney General
- Howard C. Bratton, judge of the United States District Court for the District of New Mexico
- J. S. Brenner, member of the Montana State Senate
- Nicholas Clinch, mountaineer and lawyer, namesake of Clinch Peak
- Max Coll, New Mexico House of Representatives member
- William "Billy Jack" Cox, attorney, author and political activist
- Jack Daniels, New Mexico House of Representatives member
- Hiram M. Dow, Lieutenant Governor of New Mexico
- William J. Gray, New Mexico House of Representatives member, Senior Vice President of Navajo Refining Company and Holly Frontier-Sinclair Corporation
- Donald L. Ivers, judge of the United States Court of Appeals for Veterans Claims
- Timothy Jennings, member of the New Mexico Senate
- Robert A. Junell, judge of the United States District Court for the Western District of Texas
- Joe Lane, member of the Arizona House of Representatives
- Gene Lusk, member of the New Mexico Senate
- Pat O'Rourke, politician
- Guillermo Padrés Elías, governor of Sonora, Mexico
- Sam Pick, Mayor of Santa Fe
- Anthony Principi, fourth United States Secretary of Veterans Affairs
- Joe Rice. member of the Colorado House of Representatives
- Aaron Ringel, Assistant Secretary of State for Global Public Affairs
- H. Tati Santiesteban, member of the Texas Senate
- Tony Scarborough, justice of the New Mexico Supreme Court
- John F. Simms, Governor of New Mexico
- Frank D. White, governor of Arkansas
- Frank B. Zinn, judge of the New Mexico District Court

=== Sports ===
- Link Abrams, basketball player
- Wilson Alvarez, football player
- Jack Chapple, football player
- Matt Coates, football player
- Taymon Domzalski, basketball player
- Conrad Hamilton, football player
- Joe Hernandez, professional football player
- Mary Beth Iagorashvili, modern pentathlete
- Enock Makonzo, football player for the Edmonton Elks
- Greg Morris, football player
- Hal Mumme, football coach
- Diego Pavia, football player
- Bill Purifoy, football player
- Øyvind Rojahn, golfer
- Daniel Santiago, basketball player
- Dave Sherer, football player
- Blair Smith, football player
- Joe Smith, football player
- Roger Staubach, football player, member of the Pro Football Hall of Fame
- Jordan Ta'amu, football player
- Casey Urlacher, football player, brother of Brian Urlacher
- Tim Van Galder, football player
- Tony Phillips, 18 year, MLB Player

=== Other ===
- Ernst Bertner, physician and healthcare administrator
- Daniel B. Borenstein, psychiatrist
- Clyde Snow, forensic anthropologist

== See also ==
- New Mexico Military Institute Summer Camp, Main Building, in Lincoln County, New Mexico
- National Register of Historic Places listings in Chaves County, New Mexico
