= Lia Cook =

American artist

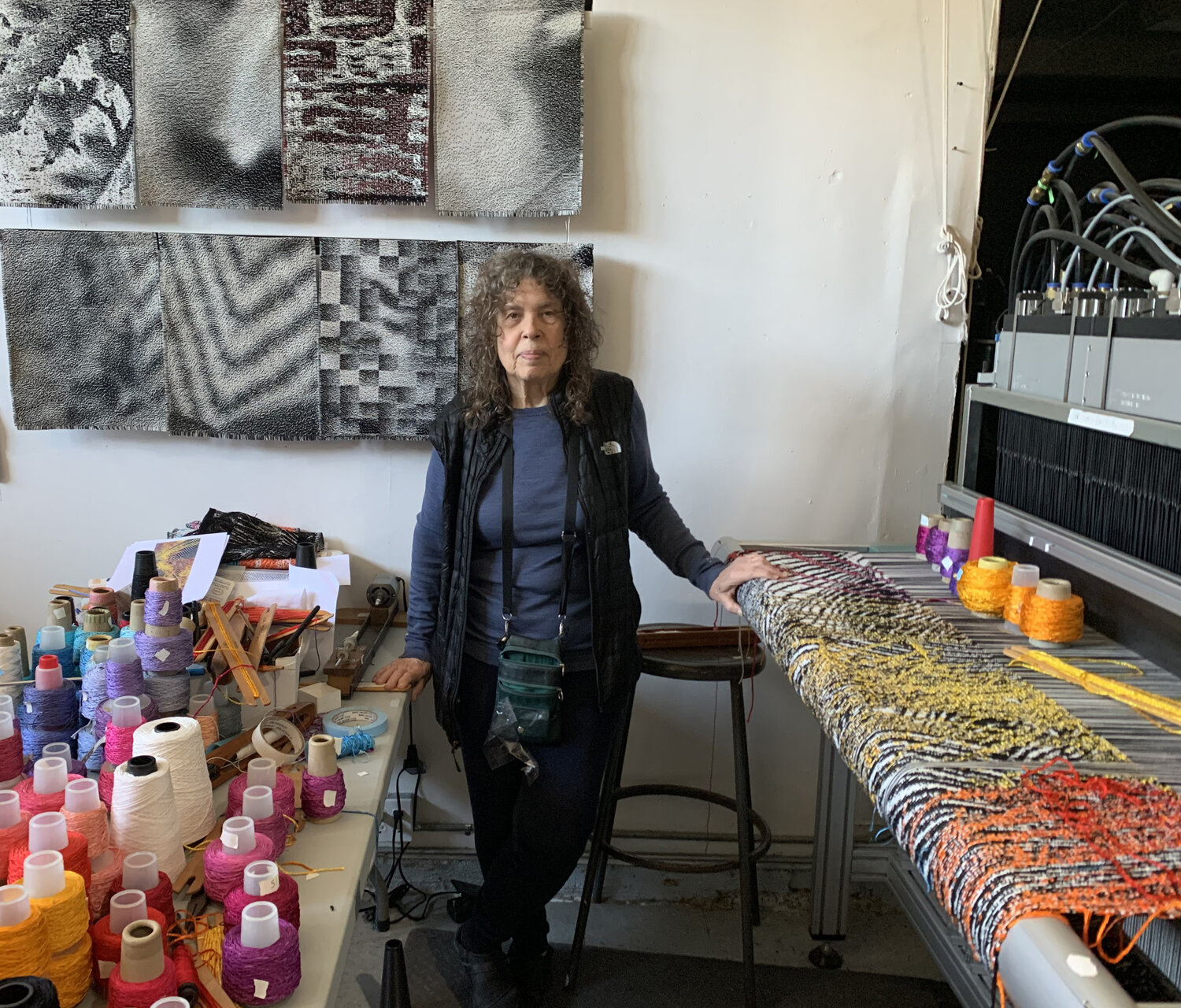
- Education: University of California, Berkeley
- Known for: Textiles
- Children: 1
- Awards: National Endowment for the Arts Fellowship; Flintridge Foundation Fellowship; Smithsonian Artist Research Fellowship (SARF)
- Website: Official website

Lia Cook is an American fiber artist noted for her work combining weaving with photography, painting, and digital technology. She lives and works in Berkeley, California, and is known for her weavings which expanded the traditional boundaries of textile arts. She has been a professor at California College of the Arts since 1976.

== Education ==
Cook graduated from the University of California, Berkeley in 1965 and went on to earn a master's degree in 1973. After studying theater at San Francisco State University, Cook received a BA degree in political science from University of California, Berkeley in 1965. During her time there, she studied painting and ceramics, in addition to political science. She went on to receive a MA degree in design from the University of California, Berkeley in 1973. During this time, she studied closely with textile artist, Ed Rossbach. In 1965 Lia travels to Mexico and encounters weaving in Chiapas and Oaxaca, It is during this period that Cook collects and is inspired by these textiles which set fourth her interest for weaving as an artistic practice. In 1967, Lia marries her first husband David Cook and they travel to Sweden together where she studies weaving from Northern Europe and the Soviet Union.

== Career ==
Cook's work focuses on breaking theories of art, craft, science and technology by combining all aspects in her textiles. Her latest project is about the brain and incorporates how humans physically and emotionally respond to images. Cook is considered a pioneer in her use of the electronic Jacquard loom, which she uses in her own work and in her teaching. Cook has completed several fellowships with the National Endowment for the Arts between 1974 and 1992. In 1976 Cook was commissioned by the Art in Architecture Program Fine Arts Collection U.S. General Service Administration to create "Spatial Ikat III" located at the Frank Hagel Federal Building in Richmond California. Cook was also an artist-in-residence at Pittsburgh University where she worked with TREND (Transdisciplinary Research in Emotion, Neuroscience, and Development) to create a body of work that researched Diffusion Spectrum Imaging. During this period Cook had her brain scanned using Diffusion Spectrum Imaging; these scans would later be incorporated into her textiles which went on display at Perimeter Gallery in 2014. Cook has since been interested with sensory sagacity and discovered that woven imagery activated brain activity most affected by touch. In 2006, Cook was once again commissioned by the U.S. General Service Administration to produce "Sons and Daughters" at the Joseph F. Weis, Jr. U.S. Courthouse in Pittsburgh Pennsylvania. Her work, Presence/Absence: Touches II, was acquired by the Smithsonian American Art Museum as part of the Renwick Gallery's 50th Anniversary Campaign.

=== Commissions ===
"Sons and Daughters" 2006, located at Joseph F. Weis, Jr. U.S. Courthouse Pittsburgh, Pennsylvania.

- "Spatial Ikat III" 1976, Art in Architecture Program Fine Arts Collection U.S. General Service Administration, located at Frank Hagel Federal Building, Richmond California.
- "Sons and Daughters" 2006, Art in Architecture Program Fine Arts Collection U.S. General Service Administration, located at Joseph F. Weis, Jr. U.S. Courthouse. Pittsburgh, Pennsylvania.

== Solo exhibitions ==
- Embedded Portraiture, 2004 Perimeter Gallery, Chicago, Illinois
- Galerie Les Drapiers, Liege, Belgium Lia Cook, Icones Jacquard, 2014
- Houston Center for Contemporary Craft
- Material Allusions, March 12, 1996 – July 7, 1996 Smithsonian American Art Museum
- Perimeter Gallery, Chicago, IL Lia Cook, Neuro Nets & Net Works, 2014
- Re-Embodied, 2006 Nancy Margolis Gallery, New York
- San Jose Museum of Quilts and Textiles, San Jose, CA Cerebral Touch: Lia Cook 1980–Now, 2017

== Public collections ==
- American Museum of Art and Design, NYC
- Art Institute of Chicago Chicago, Illinois
- Art in Embassies Program United States Department of State
- Cleveland Museum of Art Cleveland, Ohio
- Denver Art Museum Denver, Colorado
- French National Collection of Art, Paris, France
- Los Angeles County Museum of Art Los Angeles, California
- Metropolitan Museum of Art, NYC
- Museum of Modern Art, NYC
- National Gallery of Australia Parkes, Australia
- Oakland Museum of California Oakland, California
- Philbrook Museum of Art
- Racine Art Museum
- Rhode Island School of Design Museum
- Smithsonian American Art Museum Washington, D.C.
- Textile Museum (George Washington University) Washington, D.C.
- Toms Pauli Foundation, Lausanne, Switzerland

== Awards ==
- 1974, 1977, 1986, 1992 – Fellowships, National Endowment for the Arts
- 1990 – Artist's Fellowship Grant, California Arts Council
- 1993 – United States/Mexico Creative Artist's Residency, National Endowment for the Arts
- 1994 – French Fellowship, National Endowment for the Arts
- 1996 – Distinguished Faculty Award, California Faculty Award, California College of Arts and Crafts
- 1997 – American Craft Council College of Fellows
- 1998 – Distinguished Alumnus Award, University of California, Berkeley
- 2000 – Flintridge Foundation Fellowship
- 2003 – Artist's Fellowship Grant, California Arts Council
- 2008 – Gold Medal Award, Lausanne to Beijing 5th International Fiber Art Biennale Exhibition, Beijing, China
- 2010 – Artist Residence TREND group, Transdisciplinary Research in Emotion, Neuroscience and Development, Department of Psychiatry, University of Pittsburgh School of Medicine
- 2011 – Center for Cultural Innovation, Investing in Artists grant for Artistic Innovation
- 2012 – Smithsonian Artist Research Fellowship (SARF)
