= Max Coll =

American politician from New Mexico (1932–2014)

Max Welton Coll Jr.
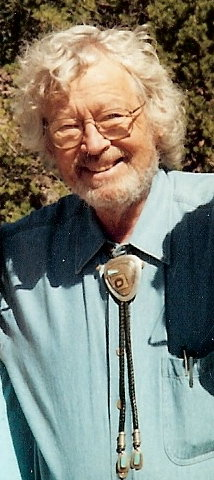

Personal details
- Born: February 26, 1932 (age 94)
- Children: 3

Max W. Coll II (February 26, 1932 – March 27, 2014) was an American politician from New Mexico.

== Political career ==
=== Roswell ===
Coll was elected to the New Mexico House of Representatives representing a Chaves County district from 1966 to 1970 as a Republican. He served as Republican Legislative Whip, and as a delegate to the state's last Constitutional Convention in 1969. He was focused on the environment and social justice issues. Coll introduced a bill requiring deposits on bottles and cans during his first term, and supported the federal Equal Rights Amendment, which wasn't ratified by New Mexico until 1972.

=== Santa Fe ===
After moving to the state's capitol of Santa Fe, Coll returned to politics in the 1980s, elected to represent Santa Fe's District 47 in 1981 as a Republican. Coll changed parties from Republican to Democrat in 1983 to tip the partisan balance in the House, and to get more Democrats to support his bills. Coll was re-elected by District 47's voters for 15 consecutive terms, usually with a landslide vote in his favor. When campaigning, Coll knocked on doors to speak to voters.

Coll served a total of 32 years in the New Mexico House of Representatives, 18 of them as Chair of the House Appropriations and Finance Committee. Coll also served on the House Taxation and Revenue Committee and as head of the Legislative Finance Committee, which serves as the permanent budget oversight panel to New Mexico's legislature. Coll held liberal stances on social justice and the environment, and he was considered a fiscal conservative. Coll came into conflict with both Republican and Democratic governors over the state's funds. Coll described his views to a reporter during his 2000 campaign as, "I think we really need to work on overcoming poverty and ignorance and poor health care... I think we should target those things, and I think government has a big role in those things." After he retired in 2004, Coll remained interested in politics, consulting with legislators who sought his advice, and lecturing on techniques of successful lobbying at a workshop given by the League of Women Voters of New Mexico in 2007.

=== Legislature ===
An early supporter of universal healthcare, in 1993 Coll joined Representative Luciano "Lucky" Varela and sponsored "NewMexicare," a single-payer healthcare system designed after Canada's that was defeated then, and again when another version of it was re-introduced in 1999. In 1994, Coll considered running as a fusion candidate of both the New Mexico Green Party and the Democrats, but withdrew under pressure from the state's Democratic Party. Also in 1994, in an effort to save the time and money of New Mexico's students in higher education, Coll led efforts, eventually successful, to ensure that credits earned at the state's two-year colleges were viable at the state's four-year institutions. Coll proposed whistle-blower protection legislation in 1997, but it was unsuccessful.

When asked for his stance on same-sex marriage in 2003, Coll felt that churches have the right to take whatever stance they choose with their own memberships. But he also felt that the state had an obligation to define civil unions, saying, "I'm very much in favor of not interfering at all with people's private sexual life or preferences...As far as civil law, we should stay out of sexual practices." In February 2003, Coll attended a rally opposing the United States' eventual military invasion of Iraq. After becoming the chair of the House Appropriations and Finance Committee, Coll chose to sponsor fewer bills of his own as a strategic move. He felt that if he were to sponsor a great number of bills, his position of power might be weakened by the need to negotiate in a variety of directions.

Coll was known for prioritizing the letter of the law. The lawsuit which gained Coll the most notoriety was brought in 1995. Coll, along with state Representative George Buffett and Guy Clark of the New Mexico Coalition Against Gambling petitioned Governor Gary Johnson for forming gaming compacts with state tribes without legislative approval. The case ended up before the New Mexico Supreme Court, which declared the gambling compacts void. The next year, due to inaccurate reporting by the Albuquerque Journal, this action got confused in the minds of some with a federal lawsuit brought by different plaintiffs seeking to declare casinos illegal in New Mexico. This confusion resulted in the formation by Pojoaque Pueblo members of a political action committee called "K'ema" or Tewa for friend, the sole goal of which was to defeat Coll's re-election on the grounds that he was racist. In reply, Coll held that, "I'm going to run my campaign like I always have. I have long taken the position that Native Americans don't have a fair piece of the pie, and I'm going to continue to work on that." Another time, Coll and Republican colleague Jerry Lee Alwin sued the state over a bond-issue designed to fund prisons in 1997.

During his retirement, Coll filed a class-action lawsuit against New Mexico's Public Regulatory Commission and its insurance department in 2006 over fixed prices and price-gouging title insurance sales. Coll also sued to keep a candidate with an insufficient number of signatures on her nominating petition off District 47's ballot in 2008, stating, "Rules are rules."

Coll often cited experience in his reasons for backing certain bills. In a battle with Governor Gary Johnson over a plan to place the state's Medicaid program in the hands of managed healthcare, Coll's objections included the death of his daughter. Coll told the Legislative Finance Committee in 1996 that his daughter's symptoms would have been noticed and addressed had she been allowed by her managed care to see the same doctor at each visit. As it was, a benign tumor that went undetected caused her to die. In February 1999, the House proposed a bill that would require those with multiple convictions for Driving Under the Influence (DUI) to pay for the installation of, and use, ignition inter-lock devices on their vehicles for six months before having their driving privileges restored. Coll proposed a tougher amendment, which was defeated, that the devices be required after the first DUI conviction.

== Family and personal history ==
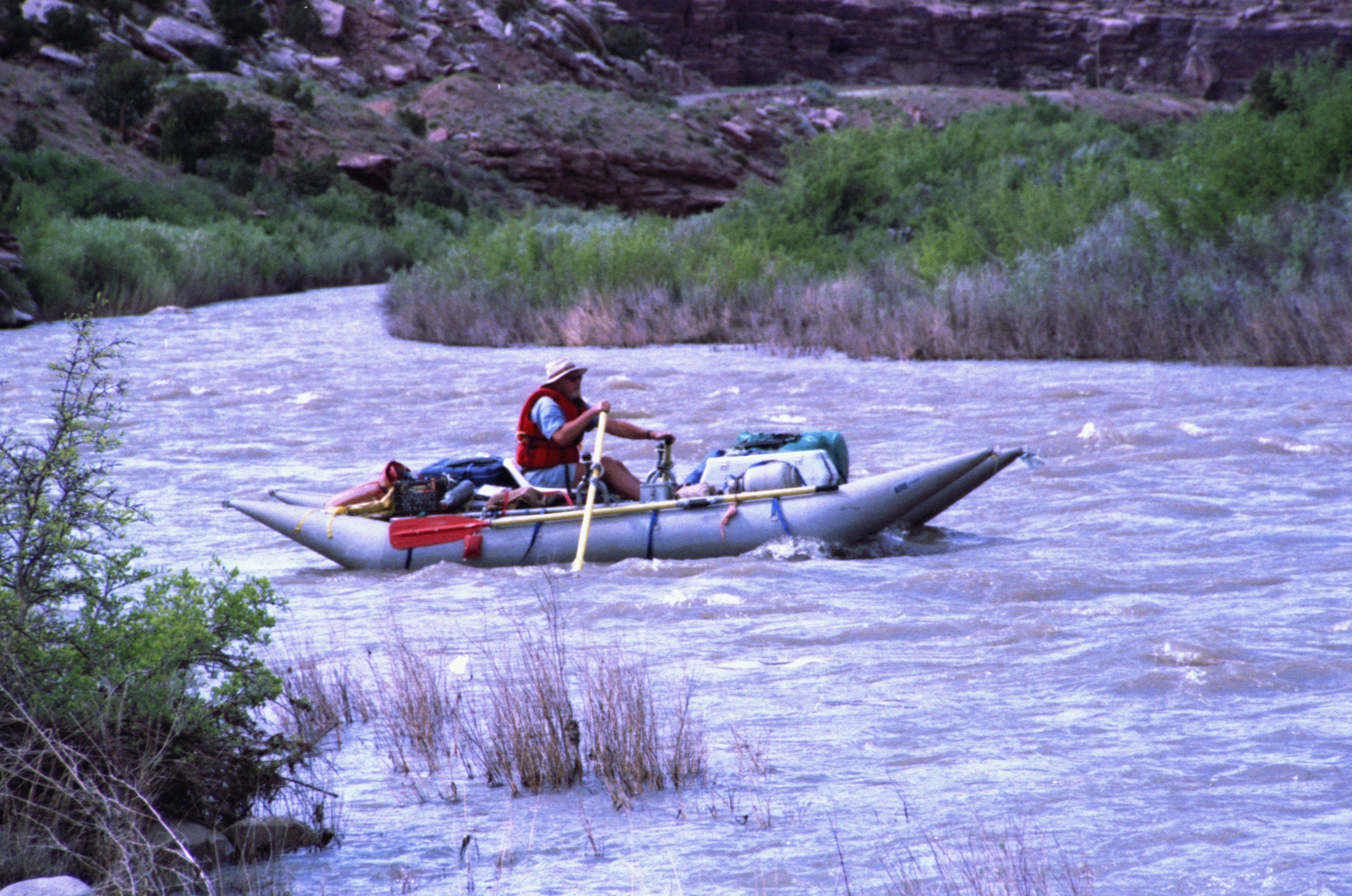
Max Coll on the Delores River below Slick Rock, Colorado, in 1997. Photo by Barry Massey.

Max W. Coll, II, was born February 26, 1932, in Roswell, New Mexico, to Max Welton Coll and Lillian Hinkle Coll and was the eldest of four sons. Coll graduated from New Mexico Military Institute's Junior College and went on to the University of Missouri, where he graduated with a BS in Chemistry in 1954. Coll's maternal grandfather was New Mexico governor James Fielding Hinkle.

Coll married Martha Lou McGranahan on July 5, 1952. They had three children: Melanie Ann, Kristi Colleen (deceased 1991) and Max Welton Coll III (Tres). During his first marriage, Coll served for three years in the United States Army in Germany. Coll and McGranahan ended their marriage December 22, 1969.

After the divorce, Coll moved to Albuquerque to attend Law School at the University of New Mexico School of Law where he graduated in 1974. He married his second wife, Sally Rodgers, on September 20, 1975 and moved to Santa Fe where he established a Law practice. Coll and Rodgers divorced on May 20, 2001.

On December 29, 2001, Coll married Catherine Joyce, a long-time resident of Taos and Santa Fe New Mexico. The two remained married until Coll's passing. When he passed the Fine Arts Education Act of 2003, he credited his wife, long a supporter of the Arts. The bill established and funded art, music, dance and drama in grade schools. As a result, the New Mexico Art Education Association renamed their Professional Lifetime Achievement Award, "The Max Coll and Catherine Joyce-Coll Award for Excellence in Art Education," to honor the couple. The award is given yearly.

Coll sometimes drew caricature art of other legislators. Coll was recognized for his fashion style while in office, which included stud earrings, a turquoise watchband, brightly-colored vests on the Capitol Floor, and bolo ties.

Coll was a rower while holding office and after retiring from politics, including many Grand Canyon trips, the Tatshenshini River in Alaska and the Salmon River in Idaho. He would sometimes leave immediately after the end of a Legislative Session for a river trip.

Coll died March 27, 2014, in Santa Fe, New Mexico after suffering a massive stroke. His memorial service was held in the Rotunda of the New Mexico State Capitol.

== Recognition ==
A section of highway US 285 near Lamy and Eldorado is named the Max Coll corridor

In 2006, Coll was declared one of Santa Fe's Living Treasures for his contributions both as legislator and citizen. On February 21, 2013, Max Coll was honored by New Mexico's House of Representatives with House Memorial 62. Sponsored by Coll's longtime colleague Representative Luciano "Lucky" Varela, the memorial was passed with a unanimous vote. In 2015, the Santa Fe County Commission named the new community center in Eldorado, New Mexico, after him.
