= Joseph F. Weis, Jr. U.S. Courthouse =

- U.S. National Register of Historic Places
- U.S. Historic district – Contributing property
- Pittsburgh Historic Designation
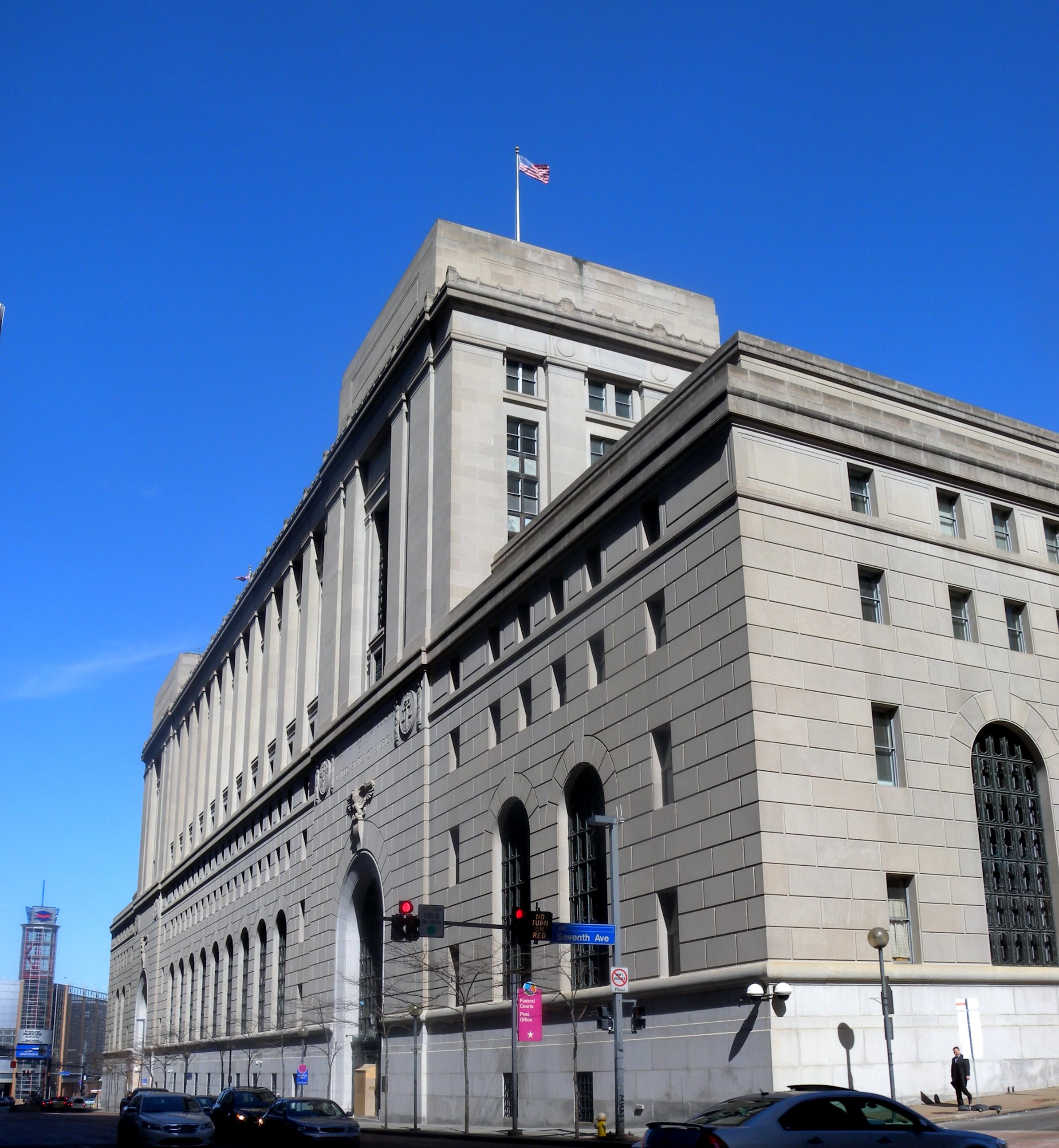

- Location within Pittsburgh Location within Pennsylvania Location within the United States
- Location: 700 Grant Street, Pittsburgh, Pennsylvania
- Coordinates: 40.44277°N 79.99402°W
- Area: 2.3 acres (0.93 ha)
- Built: 1931–1934
- Architect: Trowbridge & Livingston
- Architectural style: Beaux Arts
- NRHP reference No.: 94001620
- Added to NRHP: February 2, 1995

The Joseph F. Weis, Jr. U.S. Courthouse is a Beaux Arts-style building in Pittsburgh, Pennsylvania, US. It is a courthouse for the Western District of Pennsylvania, a United States district court. Until 2015, the building was known as the US Post Office and Courthouse-Pittsburgh.

== Building history ==
As the steel industry boomed in Pittsburgh during the last quarter of the nineteenth century, the population of the city grew. New residents required federal services, so Pittsburgh native and Secretary of the Treasury Andrew W. Mellon helped to allocate funds for a new federal building in his hometown. Mellon supported the construction of a building that would represent the rise of Pittsburgh and western Pennsylvania to national political and economic prominence.

The New York architectural firm of Trowbridge & Livingston designed the building under the auspices of Supervising Architect of the Treasury James A. Wetmore. Construction commenced in 1931 but stopped shortly thereafter due to a labor dispute. The strike ended and construction resumed on June 8, 1932. The building was erected over the rail line in order to eliminate transporting mail to and from stations. It was completed and opened to the public on October 13, 1934 amid much fanfare, as was typical for federal building dedications during the Depression era, when federal buildings were symbols of hope for economic recovery and social stability. The Western District of Pennsylvania gaveled in its first court session in the building on November 7, 1934. Referred to as the New Federal Building until 1964, when another federal building was built across the street, it was the city's main postal distribution center until the majority of postal functions moved to a new facility in 1983. General Services Administration (GSA) acquired the building the following year.

During the 20th century, the building underwent several significant interior alterations, which included the addition of new courtrooms and the removal of the train tracks. Renovations that began in 2002 involved the modernization of existing courtrooms and the installation of six new courtrooms and judge's chambers to accommodate the growing needs of the courts. Lobby spaces were restored, and the building's exterior was cleaned and re-pointed.

The U.S. Post Office and Courthouse is a contributing building in the Pittsburgh Central Downtown Historic District, which was listed in the National Register of Historic Places in 1985. Ten years later, the building was individually listed in the National Register of Historic Places as the US Post Office and Courthouse-Pittsburgh. The renovation design received a citation at the 2001 GSA Design Awards Ceremony. In 2015, the building was renamed for Joseph F. Weis Jr., a judge in the Third Circuit Court of Appeals.

The Grant Street Station Post Office, which had been in the Seventh Avenue section of the building since its opening, closed permanently at 2:00 p.m. EST on Saturday Afternoon, February 15, 2014. Glenn A. Walsh, who had leased a post office box in this Post Office for more than 25 years, was the last member of the general public in the Post Office at the time of closing.

== Architecture ==
The U.S. Post Office and Courthouse occupies the entire block bounded by Seventh and Grant streets and the Pennsylvania Railroad. The most significant exterior elevation faces Grant Street and contains the primary entrance to the courtrooms and offices.

A Monument Reborn: U.S. Post Office & Courthouse, Pittsburgh, Pennsylvania

The building was designed in the Stripped Classical style of architecture, which was commonly used for government buildings during the late 1920s and early 1930s. It is a refined style that conveys the dignity and stability of the federal government, which was particularly important during the Great Depression. It does not, however, contain excessive or exuberant ornamentation that was deemed inappropriate for a somber period in American history. It was one of the last classically inspired buildings to be constructed in Pittsburgh before Moderne architecture became popular.

The building contains two distinct masses. The first mass is four stories in height and originally housed the postal facilities. The second mass is set back slightly and includes the fifth through eleventh floors, which contain courtrooms, jury rooms, judge's chambers, and other offices.

The Post Office and Courthouse has a steel frame clad in granite on the lower levels, while the upper stories are faced in limestone. The lower portion of the building is covered in rusticated blocks that provide an appropriate foundation for the tall arched window and door openings that dominate each elevation. Massive carved limestone eagles above the entrances convey the federal importance of the building. The upper stories feature pilasters (attached columns) topped with circular medallions.

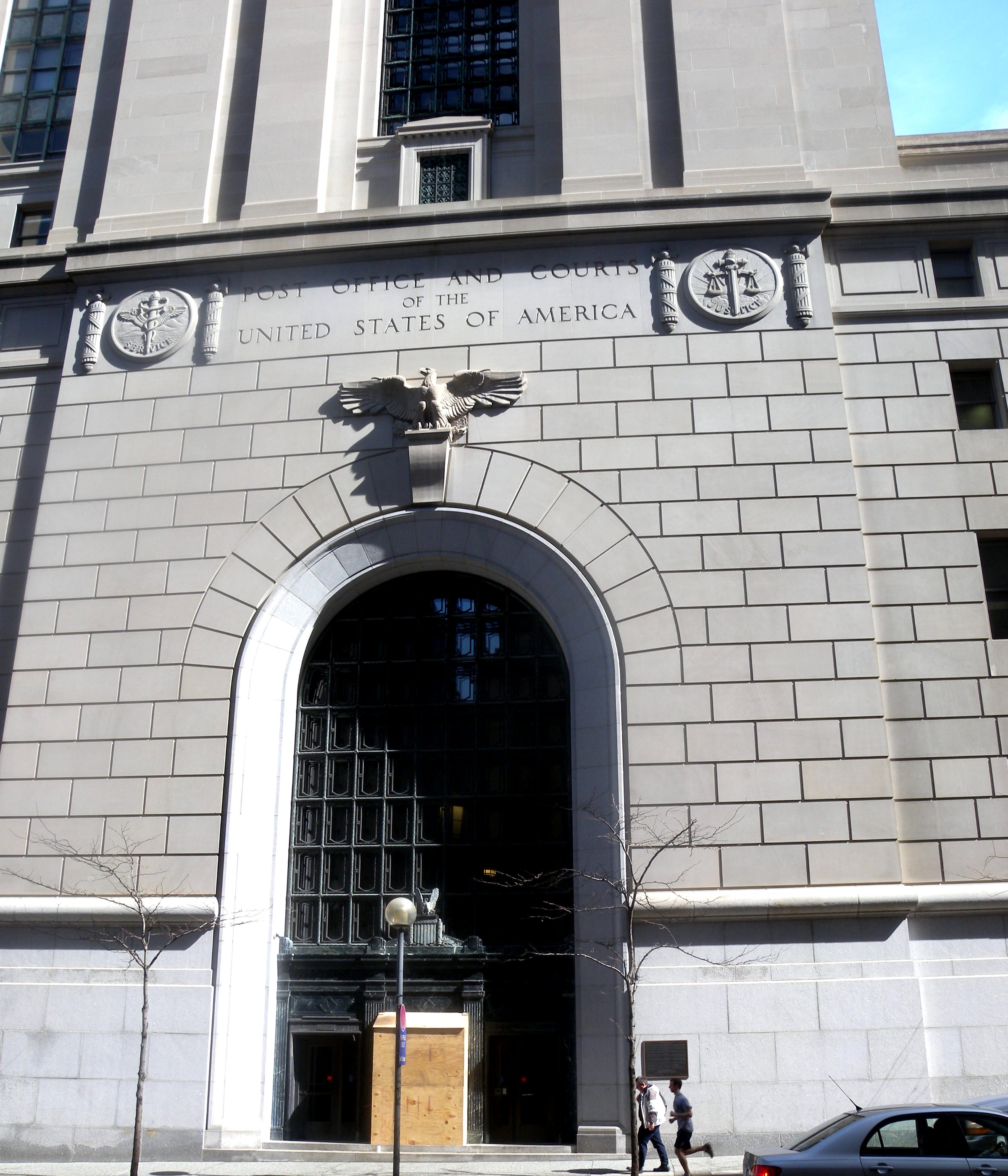
Grant Street entrance

Steel Industry (1936), fresco by Howard Cook

High-quality metals such as bronze and aluminum, which were commonly incorporated in federal buildings constructed during this era, were used on doors, window frames, window sash, and grilles. These original features remain in place throughout the building.

The building has undergone several renovations and alterations to its interior. In the 1960s and 1970s, before the post office vacated the site, original finishes in some portions of the interior were covered or removed. Some office spaces were finished with modern materials and part of the main post office area was sheathed in drywall in 1975. However, many public spaces remain intact. The south lobby at Grant Street is two stories. Walls are covered with pink Alabama marble and a marble dentil course encircles the room. Floors are covered with gray marble, while decorative coffered plaster ceilings top the space. Mouldings surrounding the bronze and glass doors contain ornate rope and garland designs. Original custom glass light fixtures remain in the lobby.

Other important public spaces include stair and elevator lobbies and corridors. Walls are generally clad in marble wainscot, and floors are covered in terrazzo. The plaster ceilings are less ornate than those found in the ground-floor lobby. Staircases have original brass handrails. The first floor contains an elaborate groin vaulted, terra cotta ceiling with gold-leaf trim, now visible from the main lobby.

The original courtrooms are among the most notable interior spaces in any historic public building in Pittsburgh. Five ceremonial courtrooms are located on the sixth and eighth floors. Each courtroom is two stories in height with wood-panel walls, decorative plaster ceilings, and ornamental lighting. During the Depression, President Franklin D. Roosevelt stimulated the economy through public works and other government expenditures. Three murals were commissioned for the courtrooms under the Treasury Section of Painting and Sculpture and installed in 1936 and 1937: Steel Industry by Howard Cook; Pittsburgh Panorama by Stuyvesant Van Veen; and Modern Justice by Kindred McLeary. A 1972 survey found that Modern Justice had been removed. It remains lost today.

The 2002 to 2006 modifications included glazed additions to house new courtrooms within the existing light courts. The General Services Administration commissioned Brian Shure and Lia Cook to create new works of art. Shure's three murals depict contemporary Pittsburgh from a variety of vantage points. Cook's work, a textile painting depicting images of children, combines hand weaving techniques with computer technology.

== Significant events ==
- 1931-1934: Building constructed and occupied
- 1960s-1990s: Various alterations to interior spaces
- 1984: GSA acquires the building from the U.S. Postal Service
- 1985: Listed in the National Register of Historic Places as part of the Pittsburgh Central Downtown Historic District
- 1995: Individually listed in the National Register of Historic Places
- 2002-2006: Renovations and repairs to interior and exterior spaces, including the addition of six new courtrooms
- 2015: The courthouse was renamed after the death of Pittsburgh-born appellate judge Hon. Joseph F. Weis Jr.

== Building facts ==
- Location: 700 Grant Street
- Architects: Trowbridge & Livingston; Shalom Baranes Associates
- Construction Dates: 1931-1934; 2002–2006
- Floor Area: 805,397 sq. feet
- Floors: 14
- Landmark Status: Individually listed in the National Register of Historic Places and a contributing building within the Pittsburgh Central Downtown Historic District
- Architectural Style: Stripped Classical
- Primary Materials: Granite and Limestone
- Prominent Features: Original lobby with decorative finishes; Elaborate courtrooms with murals

== In popular culture ==
- a/k/a Tommy Chong
- American Greed "Cybercrime"
