= Bill Purifoy =

American football player (1959–2013)

No. 71
- Position: Defensive end

Personal information
- Born: November 15, 1959; Pittsburgh, Pennsylvania, U.S.
- Died: October 14, 2013 (aged 53); Pittsburgh, Pennsylvania, U.S.
- Listed height: 6 ft 7 in (2.01 m)
- Listed weight: 255 lb (116 kg)

Career information
- High school: Steel Valley (PA)
- College: Tulsa
- NFL draft: 1982: 7th round, 193rd overall pick

Career history
- Dallas Cowboys (1982)*; Arizona Wranglers (1983)
- * Offseason or practice squad member only

William Dewitt Purifoy, Sr. (November 15, 1959 – October 14, 2013) was an American football defensive end in the United States Football League (USFL) for the Arizona Wranglers. He played college football at the University of Tulsa.

== Early life ==
Purifoy attended Steel Valley High School, where he practiced football and basketball. He received All-conference and All-state honors at defensive tackle as a senior.

He enrolled at the New Mexico Military Institute. He transferred to the University of Tulsa after his freshman season. He was named a starter at defensive end as a sophomore. He had 15 tackles (11 solo) against the University of Louisville as a junior.

In 1980, he left school and returned to his hometown in Pittsburgh to work as a fireman. He returned for his senior season in 1981 and was named a team's co-captain. He had 9 tackles, 3 sacks and one blocked punt against the University of Kansas.

== Professional career ==
=== Dallas Cowboys ===
Purifoy was selected 193rd overall by the Dallas Cowboys in the seventh round (193rd overall) of the 1982 NFL draft. He was waived on August 31.

=== Arizona Wranglers (USFL) ===
On October 4, 1982, he was signed as a free agent by the Arizona Wranglers of the United States Football League. In 1983, he was placed on the injured reserve list, before being activated on May 8. He played 11 snaps against the Michigan Panthers before re-injuring his right hamstring and being lost for the season.

== Personal life ==
On October 14, 2013, he died of natural causes at UPMC Mercy. For 17 years he was the Fire Chief of the Homestead Volunteer Fire Department. He was a detective with the District Attorney's Vicious Crime and Firearms Task Force.

In the early nineties, he was a community service officer in the Tulsa City police force and then in the Tulsa County sheriff's department. In 1991, he was named Tulsa Deputy of the Year for 1991 after being shot while doing a gang investigation.
