= Barbara Latham =

American painter and illustrator (1896–1989)

- Born: June 6, 1896; Walpole, Massachusetts
- Died: May 28, 1989 (aged 92); Santa Fe, New Mexico
- Resting place: Fairview Cemetery (Santa Fe, New Mexico)
- Education: Andrew Dasburg
- Alma mater: Pratt Institute; Art Students League of New York
- Known for: Prints, book illustration, painting
- Spouse: Howard Cook

Barbara Latham (June 6, 1896 – May 28, 1989) was an American painter, printmaker, and children's book illustrator.

== Early life and education ==
Latham was born on June 6, 1896, in Walpole, Massachusetts, and raised in Norwich, Connecticut. Her parents were Allen and Caroline Walker Latham.

She was raised in a farmhouse. Her family were naturalists who had a large apiary and she was given a small hive of her own. Her father developed a unique queen bee and he invented honey butter, which is not honey with butter, but a honey that is specially whipped at a specific temperature to achieve a specific texture and solidity. Traveling by boat, then by surrey, they spent summers three miles from Provincetown, on Cape Cod, where her father had built a house. Living rustically, they had no phone, electricity or access to cars. Barbara won her first art scholarship at age eight from the Norwich Free Academy, where her father taught and he would observe her from his window in her art classroom. She also attended the Art Students League in Woodstock during the summer under instructors from The League in New York City. Once while painting from nude models, an older female student became upset with fact the nude model that day was a teenager. Andrew Dasburg was called to handle the situation which he did by putting a tablecloth around the boy.

She studied at Norwich Free Academy, and at Pratt Institute in Brooklyn, New York, from which she graduated in 1919. She also studied, at the Art Students League of New York summer school in Woodstock, with modernist painter Andrew Dasburg.

== Taos, New Mexico ==
In 1925, Latham went to Taos, New Mexico, to produce graphic illustrations of southwestern life for Joseph O'Kane Foster's greeting card company. In Taos Victor Higgins introduced her to artist Howard Cook, whom she married in May 1927. From 1928 to 1935, they traveled: to Europe, Mexico and the American South. In 1938, the couple settled near Taos on the Talpa ridge. This became their base until 1976.

Latham painted and created prints of the Taos landscape, including town views and scenes of the rural life of the Taos Pueblo Indians. In addition, she did illustrations for children's books, including Pedro, Nina and Perritto (1939) and Maggie, which was included in the American Institute of Graphic Arts best books list from 1945 to 1950.

== Roswell and Santa Fe, New Mexico ==
In 1967, Cook became the first artist in the Roswell Museum and Art Center's Artist-in-Residence program. The couple started to spend their winters in Roswell, New Mexico, where they eventually moved in 1973.

Due to Cook's health issues, the couple moved to Santa Fe in 1976. Cook died in 1980. Latham died on May 28, 1989.

== Public collections ==
- Metropolitan Museum of Art
- Dallas Museum of Fine Arts
- Library of Congress
- New Mexico Museum of Art
- Philadelphia Museum of Art
