= New Mexico Military Institute Summer Camp, Main Building =

- U.S. National Register of Historic Places
- Location within New Mexico
- Nearest city: Ruidoso, New Mexico
- Coordinates: 33.306351°N 105.669413°W
- Area: less than one acre
- Built: 1926
- Architectural style: Late 19th and 20th Century Revivals
- NRHP reference No.: 83001622
- Added to NRHP: May 2, 1983

The New Mexico Military Institute Summer Camp, Main Building was built in 1926. It was listed on the National Register of Historic Places in 1983.

It is located in a ravine near the Carrizo River, in Lincoln County, New Mexico, near Ruidoso, New Mexico.

The building is U-shaped and reflects a mix of Revivals styles,

with rustic simplicity appropriate to the

wilderness setting of New Mexico's White Mountains: the Spanish-Pueblo Revival Styles, and the English Tudor Collegiate Gothic Revival Style, with some suggestions of the Italianate Villa Revival Style. The resulting effect is that of an unusual

combination of the "picturesque styles", unique in New Mexico.

It has ornamental vigas.

It was part of the New Mexico Military Institute (N.M.M.I.).

It has also been known as Camp Carrizo and Carrizo Lodge.
