= Stuyvesant Van Veen =

American artist and muralist

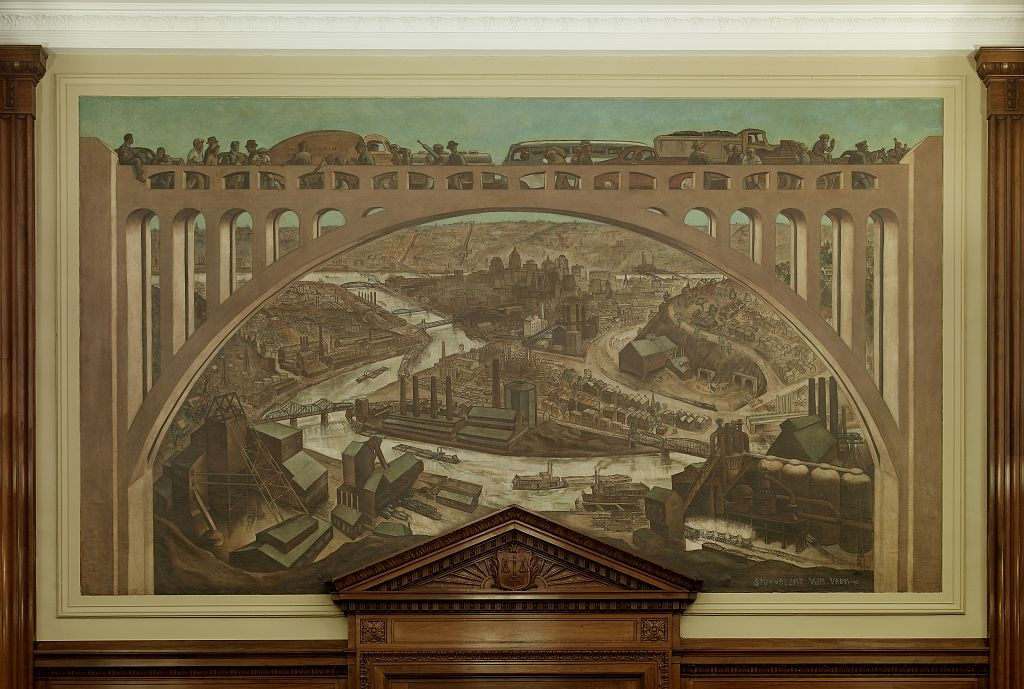
Van Veen's Pittsburgh Panorama at the U.S. Courthouse and Post Office, Pittsburgh, Pennsylvania

Stuyvesant Van Veen (September 12, 1910 – 1988) was an American artist and muralist.

== Life ==
Stuyvesant Van Veen was born in New York City on September 12, 1910. He studied at the National Academy of Design and the Art Students League of New York. In 1929, at the age of 19, he became the youngest contributor to an international exhibition of modern paintings at the Carnegie Institute in Pittsburgh, Pennsylvania.

Van Veen was later commissioned by the U.S. Treasury Department's Section of Painting and Sculpture to paint Pittsburgh Panorama in 1937. The mural, which hangs in Courtroom No. 3 of the U.S. Post Office and Courthouse in downtown Pittsburgh, features the Westinghouse Bridge framing the city. Decades later, Van Veen, who held leftist beliefs, revealed in an interview that he had given the Monongahela River an especially pronounced bend as a subtle way of incorporating a sickle into the scene.

In addition to Pittsburgh Panorama, Van Veen created numerous other murals under the Federal Art Project, including works for the Ebbets Field Apartments, the 1964 New York World's Fair, Wright-Patterson Air Force Base, and the Family Court Building in Philadelphia.

Van Veen also taught painting at the City College of New York.
