= Ted Kuykendall =

American artist and photographer

- Ted Kuykendall, Self-portrait, 1987
- Born: 1953; Roswell, New Mexico, U.S.
- Died: October 5, 2009 (aged 55–56); Roswell, New Mexico, U.S.
- Education: New Mexico Military Institute; University of New Mexico
- Occupations: Artist, photographer
- Children: 1 son

Ted Kuykendall (1953 - October 5, 2009) was an American artist and photographer.

== Life ==
Kuykendall was born in 1953 in Roswell, New Mexico. He graduated from the New Mexico Military Institute. He was trained by sculptor Luis Jiménez and photographer Richard Schaeffer, before graduating from the University of New Mexico.

Kuykendall became a professional artist and photographer. He was a Roswell artist-in-residence at the Roswell Museum and Art Center in 1975. He was awarded the Willard Van Dyke Memorial Grant. The historian of photography, Van Deren Coke, described Kuykendall's photographs as "puzzling pictures full of wonders that draw us into a fragile synthesis of anonymity and frightening intimacy."

Kuykendall had a son, Ian. He died of pneumonia on October 5, 2009, in Roswell, at age 56.

== Collections ==
His work is held in the permanent collections of many museums like the Roswell Museum and Art Center, the New Mexico Museum of Art, the Albuquerque Museum of Art and History, Albright–Knox Art Gallery, the Denver Art Museum, the Museum of Fine Arts, Houston, and the Smithsonian American Art Museum.
