= Howard Cook =

American artist

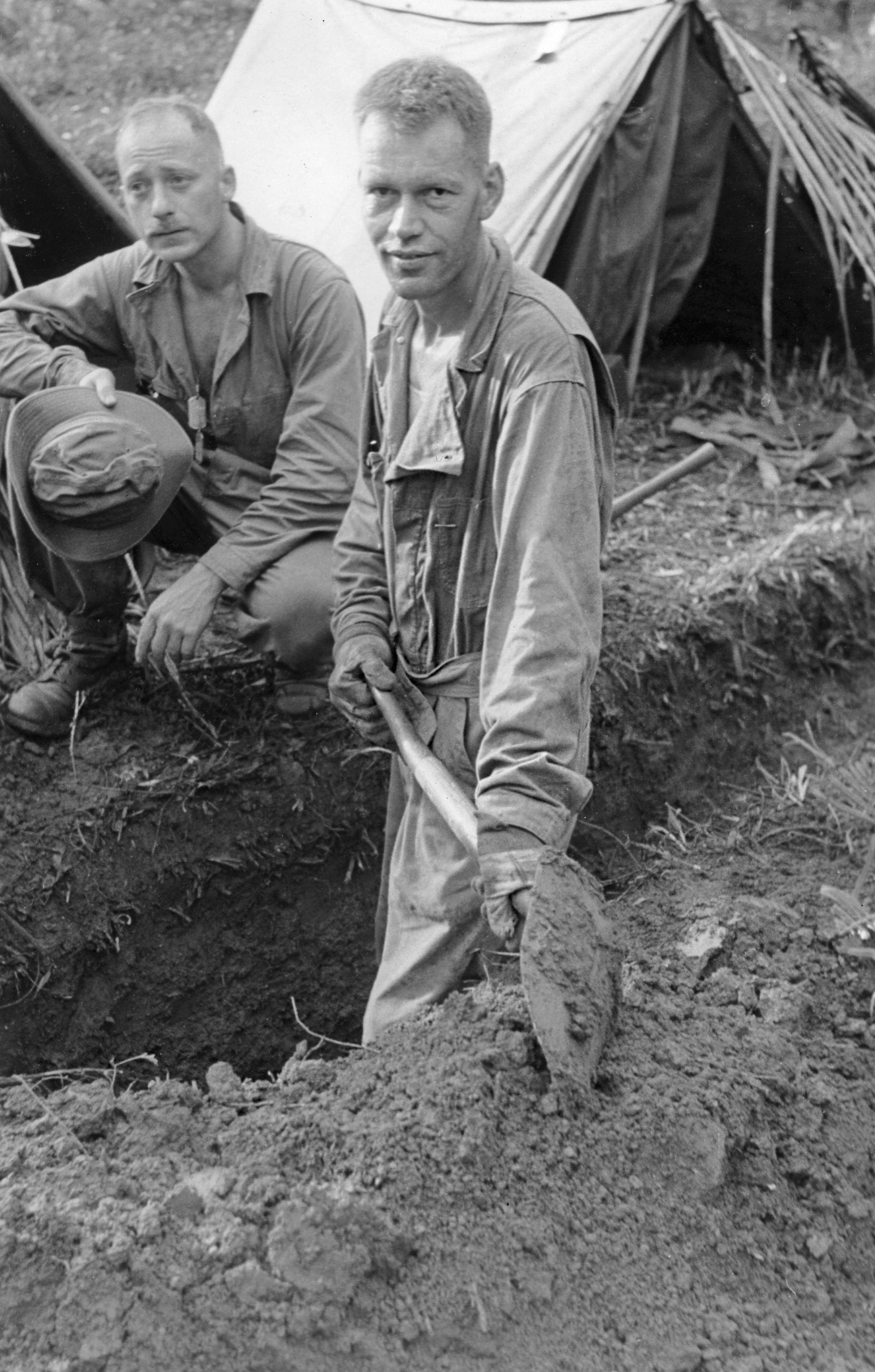
- War artists Aaron Bohrod (left) and Howard Cook on Rendova Island, June 1943
- Born: July 16, 1901; Springfield, Massachusetts
- Died: June 24, 1980 (aged 78); Santa Fe, New Mexico
- Education: Andrew Dasburg; Maurice Sterne
- Alma mater: Art Students League of New York
- Known for: Printmaking, watercolors, frescos
- Style: expressionistic, abstract, realistic
- Spouse: Barbara Latham
- Awards: Guggenheim Fellowships in 1932, 1934

Howard Norton Cook (1901–1980) was an American artist, particularly known for his wood engravings and murals. Cook spent much of the 1920s in Europe and returned to live in Taos, New Mexico.

Steel Industry (1936) Cook's fresco at Joseph F. Weis, Jr. U.S. Courthouse in Pittsburgh, Pennsylvania

Cook first came to Taos, New Mexico in 1926 commissioned by The Forum to make a series of woodcuts to illustrate Death Comes for the Archbishop that would be published serially in the periodical. In Taos he was introduced to artist Barbara Latham by Victor Higgins. The couple married in May 1927. From 1928 to 1935, they traveled: to Europe, Mexico and the American South. Working for New Deal art projects, Cook produced murals for courthouses in Pittsburgh (Section of Painting and Sculpture) and Springfield, Massachusetts (Public Works of Art Project). He also produced a 16-panel fresco, The Importance of San Antonio in Texas History, in a San Antonio post office, for which he was paid $12,000 in 1937. In 1938, the couple settled near Taos on the Talpa ridge. This became their base until 1976.

In 1943 Cook was appointed to lead a World War II art unit in the Asiatic-Pacific Theater. His team accompanied the U.S. Army's 43rd Infantry Division throughout the region, including the Solomon Islands, New Hebrides and Phoenix Islands. After six months Cook returned home on a medical discharge. Drawings and watercolors from Cook's war experiences in the South Pacific were part of the touring exhibition The Army at War: A Graphic Record by American Artists (1944), sponsored by the Treasury Department.

In 1967, Cook became the first artist in the Roswell Museum and Art Center's Artist-in-Residence program. The couple started to spend their winters in Roswell, New Mexico, where they eventually moved in 1973. Due to Cook's ill health, the couple moved to Santa Fe in 1976. Cook died in 1980.

== Public collections ==
- Metropolitan Museum of Art
- Whitney Museum of American Art
- Fogg Art Museum
- Harvard University
- Baltimore Museum of Art
- Art Institute of Chicago
- Bibliothèque Nationale de France
- British Museum
- Albuquerque Museum
- Smithsonian American Art Museum
