= J. S. Brenner =

American politician

Member of the Montana State Senate
- In office 1952–1966

Member of the Montana House of Representatives
- In office 1949–1952

Personal details
- Born: John Skoning Brenner; January 2, 1911 Elgin, Illinois, U.S.
- Died: June 24, 1980 (aged 69) Dillon, Montana, U.S.
- Party: Republican
- Occupation: rancher

John Skoning Brenner (January 2, 1911 – July 24, 1980) was an American politician in the state of Montana. A Republican, he served in the Montana House of Representatives from 1949 to 1952 and Montana Senate from 1952 to 1966. In 1963, he served as minority leader of the state Senate. Born at Elgin, Illinois in 1911, Brenner attended the New Mexico Military Institute, Montana State University, and the University of Pennsylvania. He was a cattle rancher and lived in Grant, Beaverhead County, Montana. He was also a member and president of the Montana Stock Growers Association. He was defeated for reelection to the state Senate in 1966 by Frank W. Hazelbaker.
