= Anderson Museum of Contemporary Art =

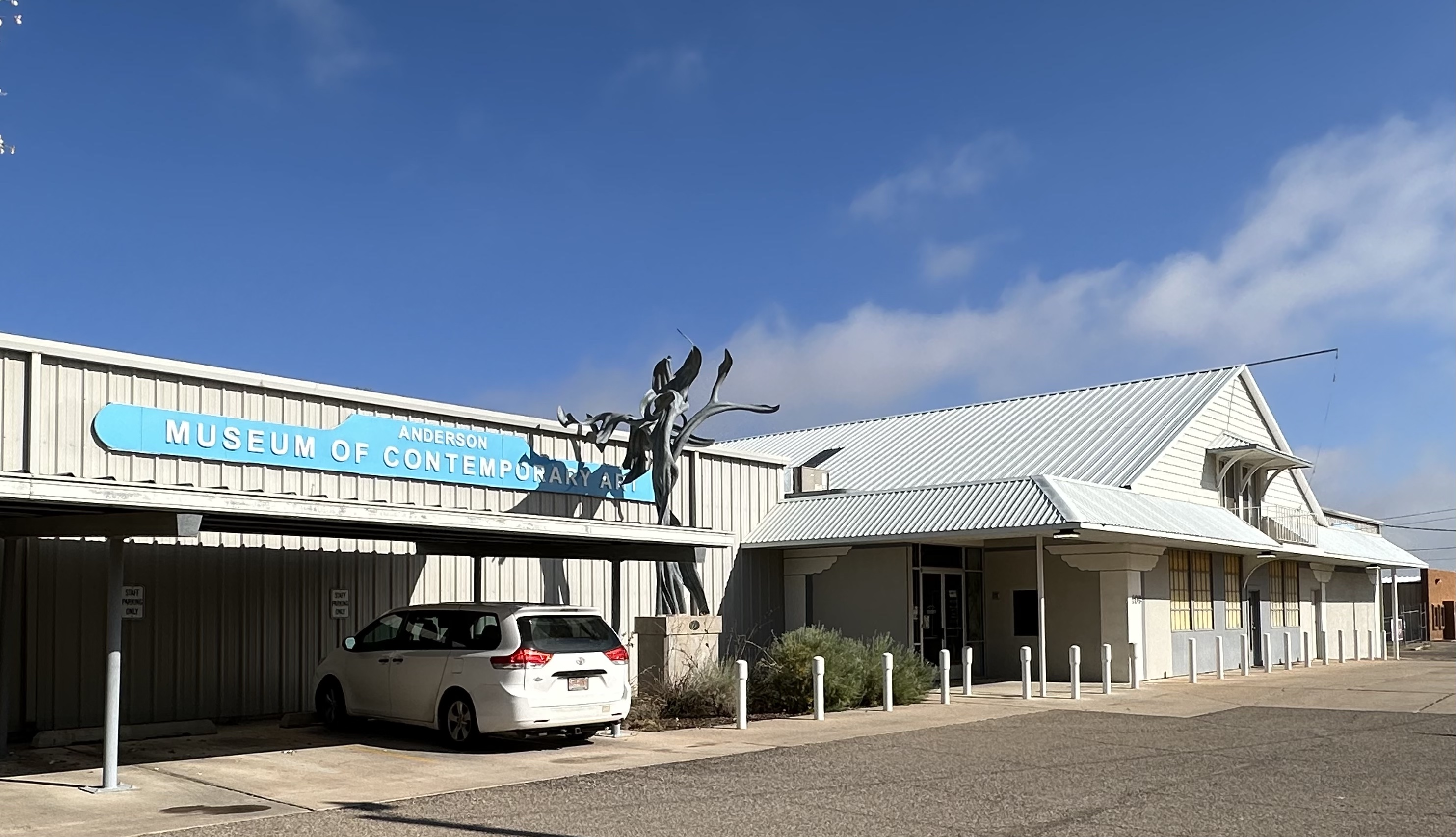
- Former name: Anderson Museum
- Established: 1994
- Location: 409 E. College Blvd, Roswell, New Mexico, U.S.
- Coordinates: 33.40891°N 104.5169°W
- Type: Art museum

Anderson Museum of Contemporary Art (AMoCA) is an American art museum founded in 1994 and located in Roswell, New Mexico. The museum was formed from the Roswell Artist-in-Residence (RAIR) program, and displays work from the former participants.

== History ==
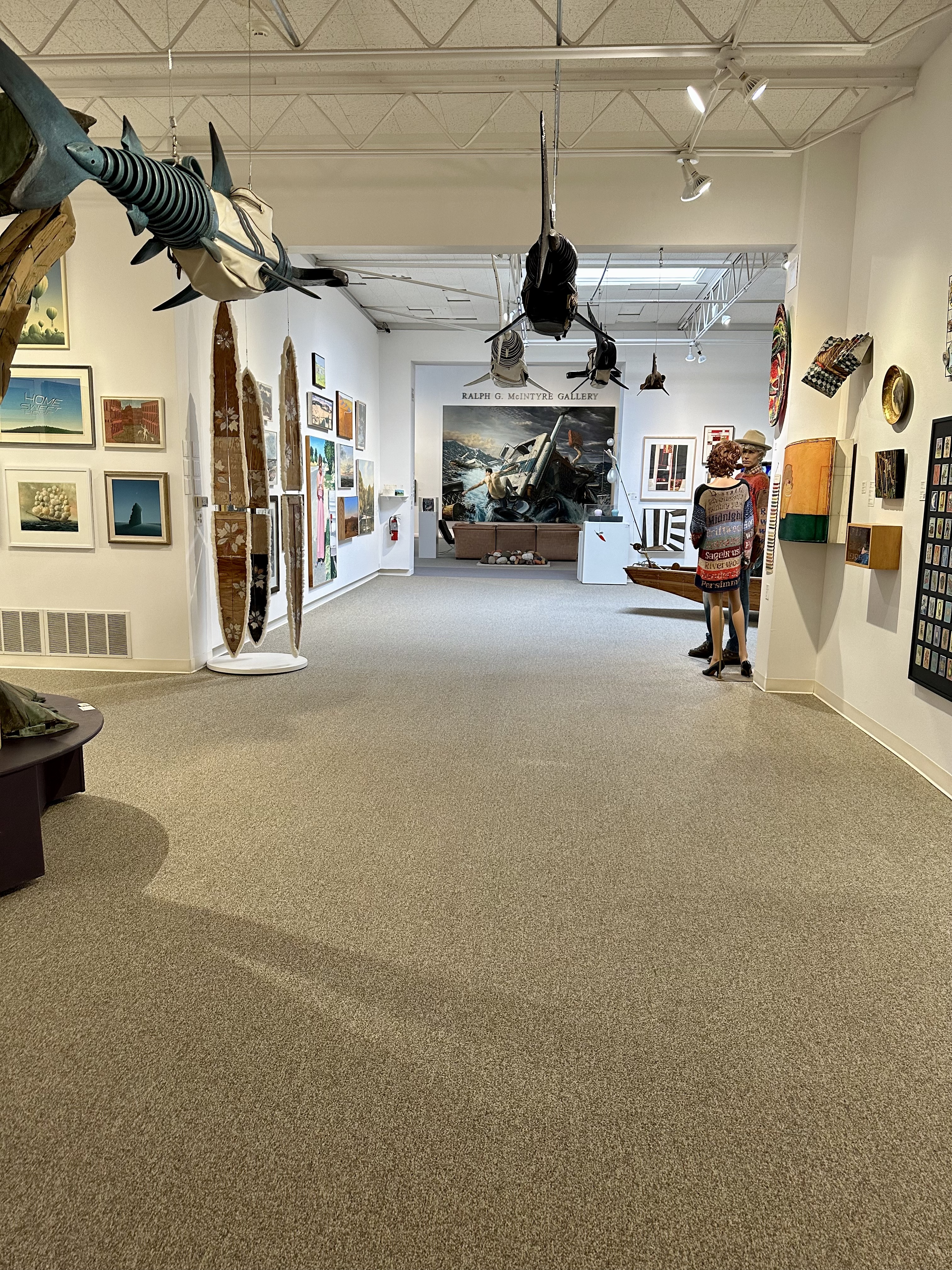
Interior showing gallery

The residency and art collection was started in 1967 by Donald B. Anderson (1919–2020), who wanted to bring national art and artists to Roswell. Donald B. Anderson had made his money in oil industry as a founder and executive at Anderson Oil Company, and later turned painter and art collector.

Since June 2002, the museum has been administered by the Roswell Artist-in-Residence Foundation. In 2017, the Roswell Artist-in-Residence (RAIR) won the Governor's Award for Excellence in the Arts.

Artists with work in the museum collection include Luis Jiménez, Milton Resnick, Olive Ayhens, Judy Richardson, Johnnie Winona Ross, and Robbie Barber.

== See also ==
- Roswell Museum
