= Roswell Museum =

Museum and planetarium in New Mexico, US

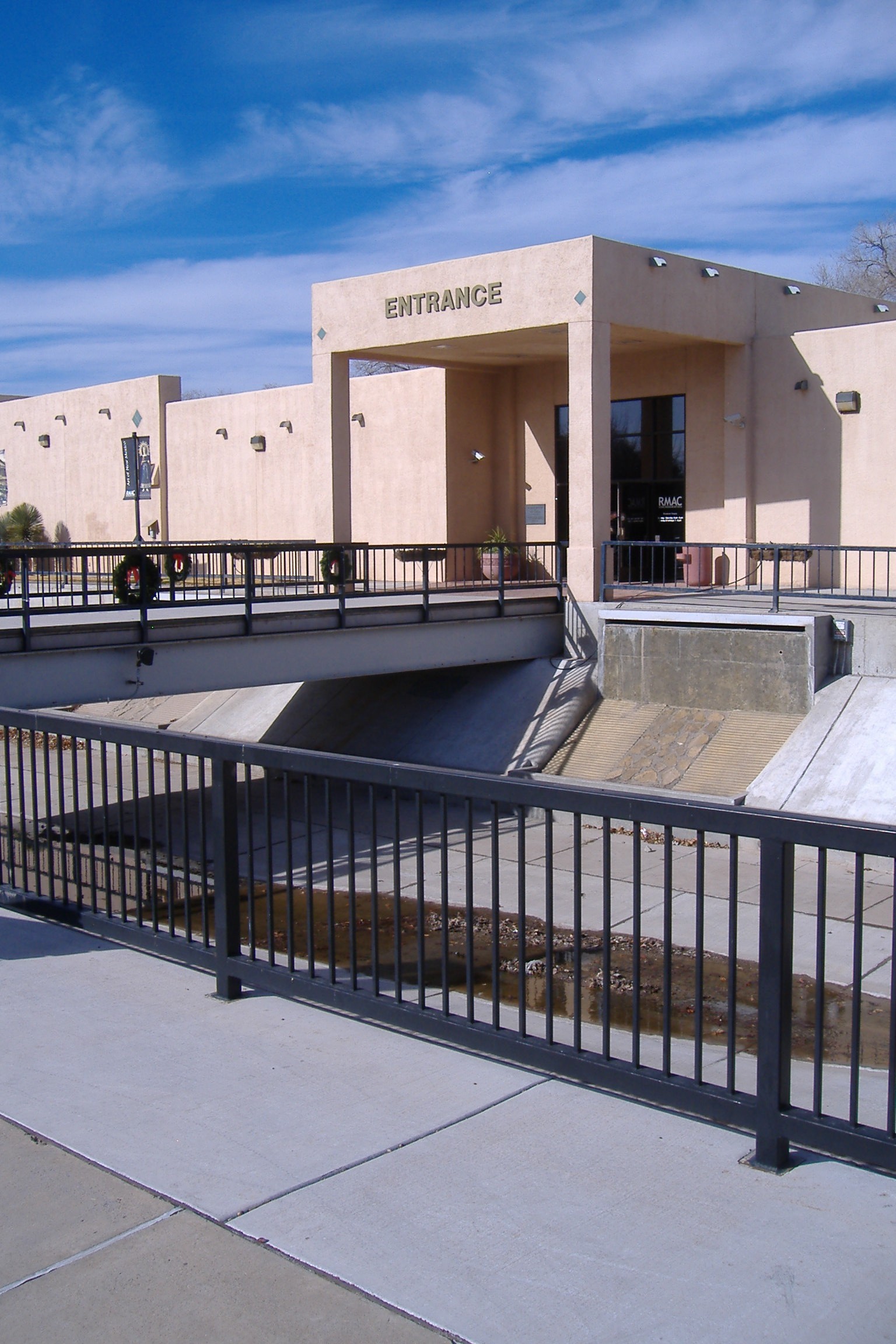
- Former name: Roswell Museum and Art Center
- Established: 1936
- Location: 1011 N. Richardson Avenue, Roswell, New Mexico, U.S.
- Coordinates: 33.4042°N 104.5237°W
- Type: Municipal museum
- Key holdings: Robert H. Goddard
- Collections: Visual art collection, education center, planetarium
- Owner: City of Roswell
- Website: roswell-nm.gov/1259/Roswell-Museum

The Roswell Museum (formerly Roswell Museum and Art Center) was founded in 1936 and is located in Roswell, New Mexico, United States. The museum features exhibits about the art and history of the American Southwest, as well as the Robert H. Goddard laboratory.

The museum operates the Patricia Lubben Bassett Art Education Center, opened in 1998, as a learning facility. The facility houses two classrooms, a ceramics studio, and research library, all of which supports a museum-school-community creative exchange that provides arts education opportunities for all ages.

The Robert H. Goddard Planetarium was built through an initiative shared by the museum and the Roswell Independent School District in 1968. Once considered the largest planetarium in New Mexico, it is capable of reproducing the night sky as seen from any point on Earth. The Robert H. Goddard Planetarium is home to a state-of-the-art, full-dome digital theater system with Digistar 6 programming.

== History ==
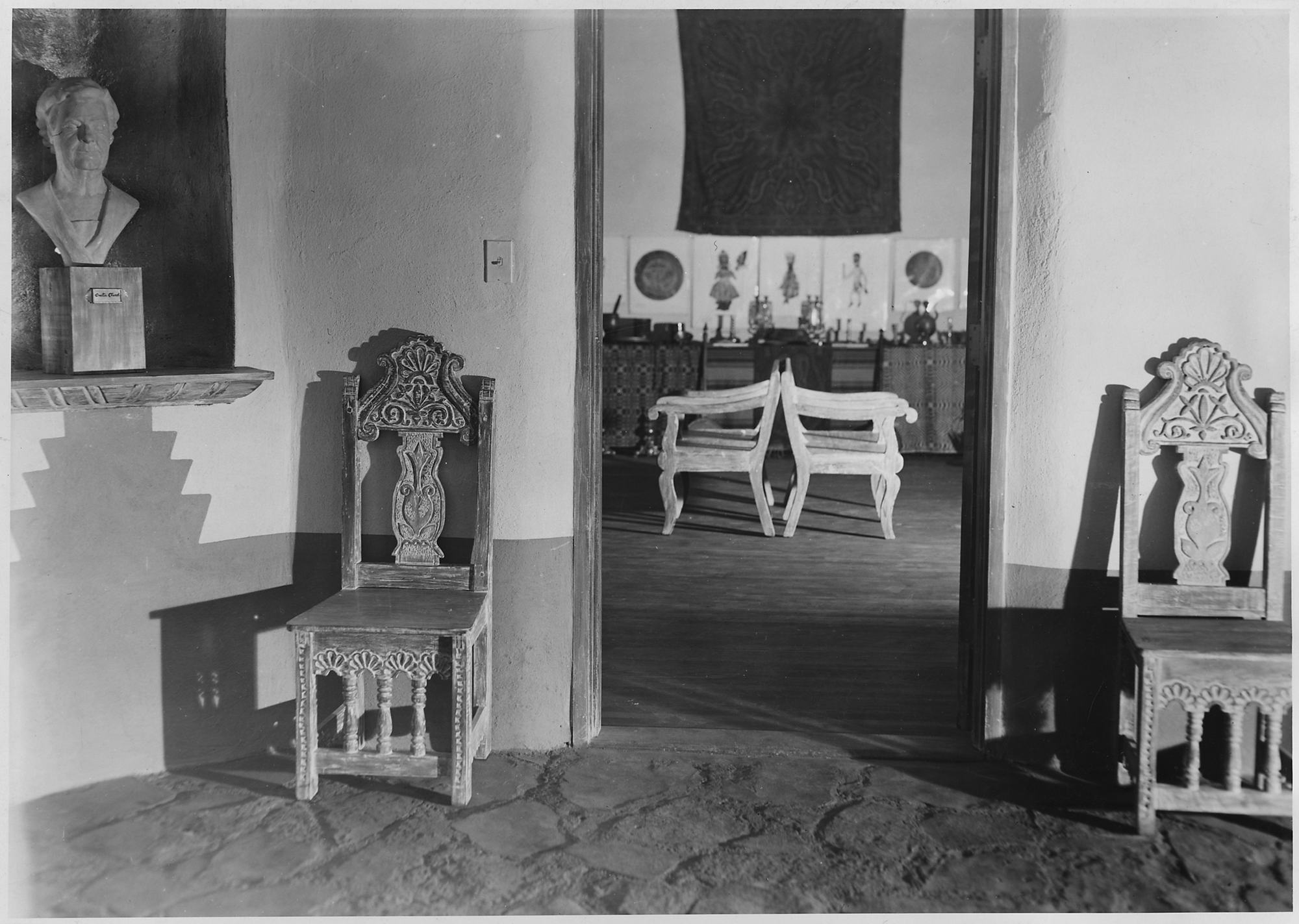
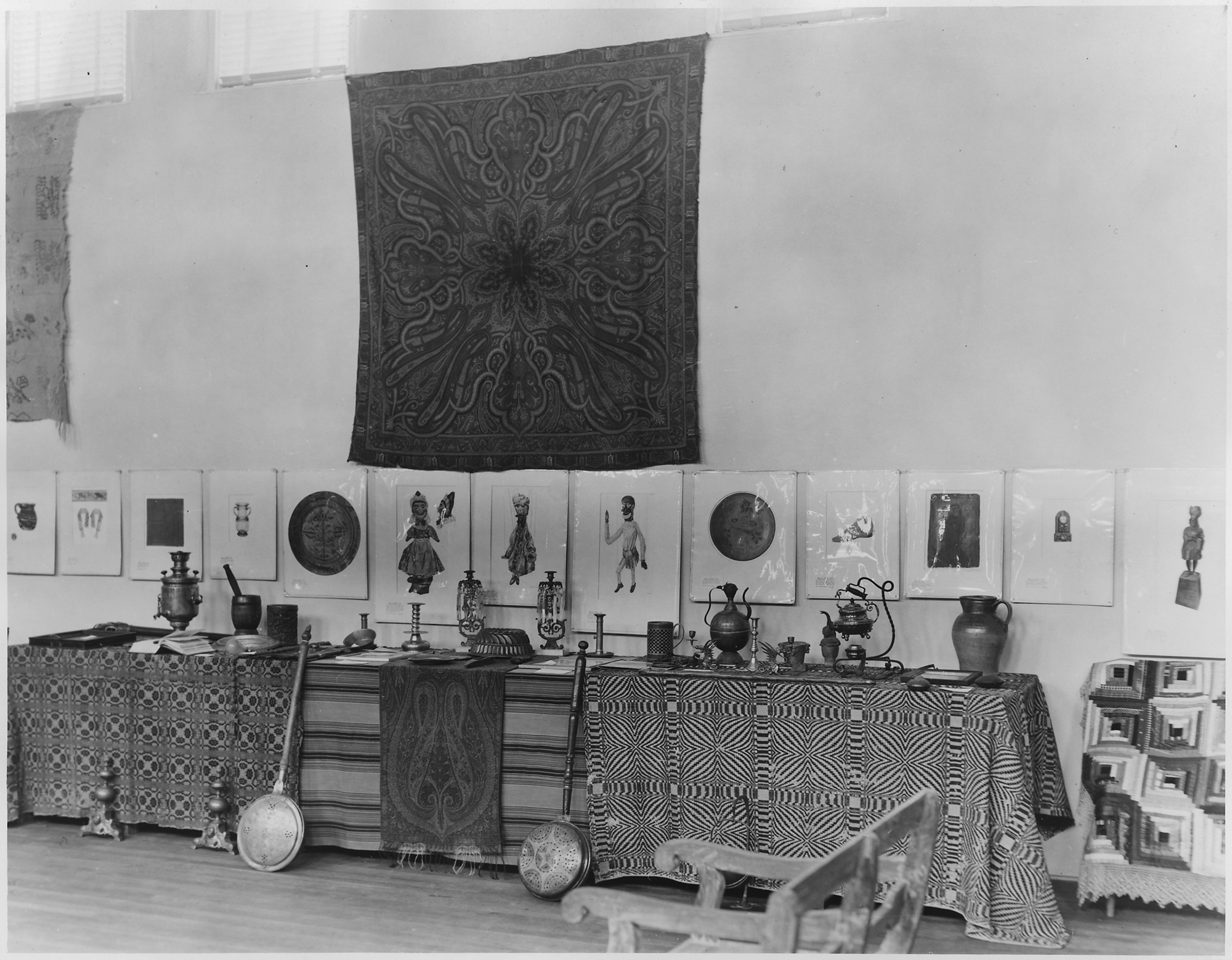

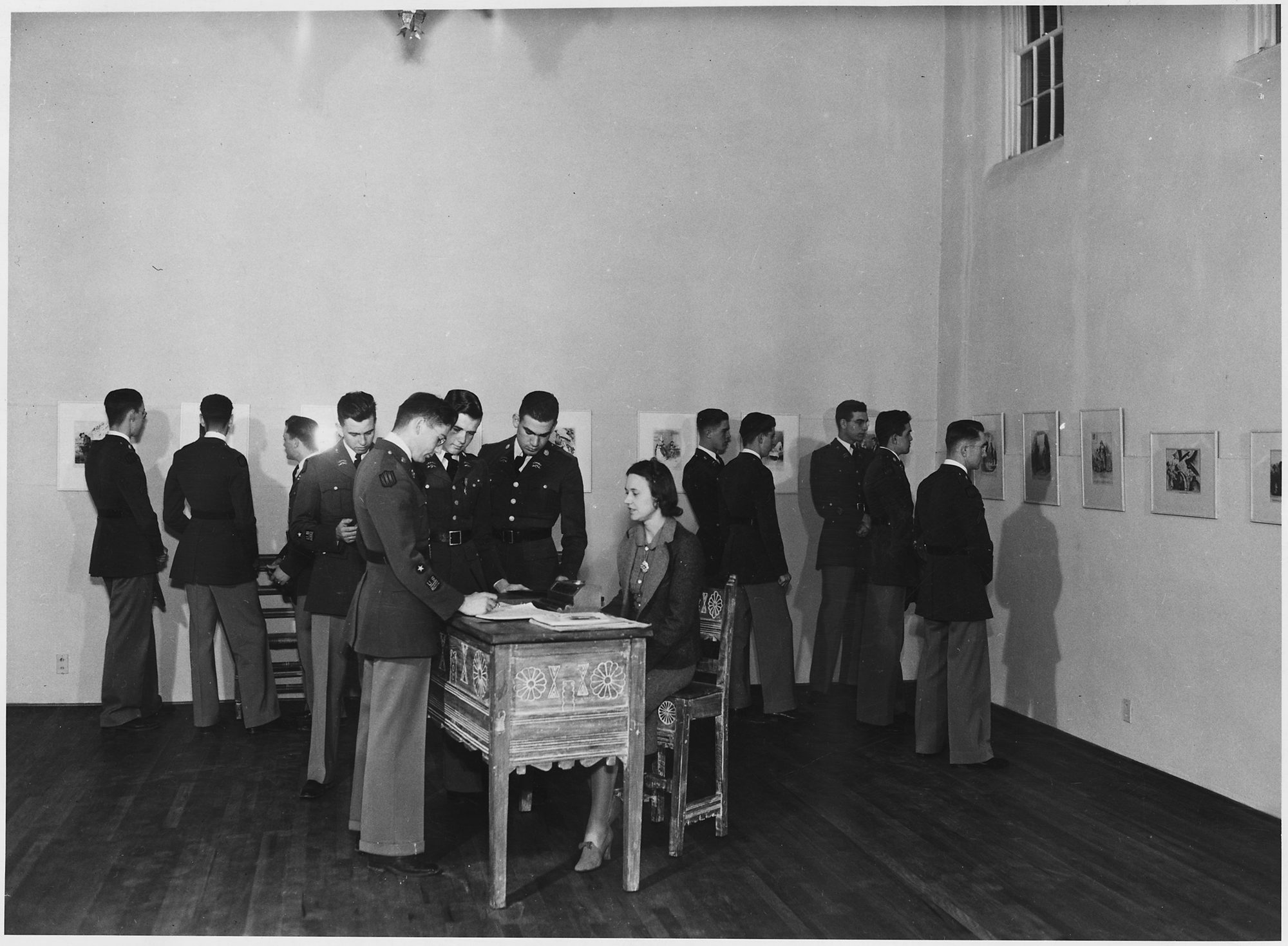
The Roswell Museum and Art Center in 1941, a community art center established by the WPA Federal Art Project

The museum was founded in 1936, after funding from New Mexico's Works Progress Administration (WPA) (authorized by manager Lea Rowland), with the goal of storing Southeastern New Mexican items for the local historical and archaeological society and acting as a community center. The museum opened on December 10, 1937, as one of the numerous cultural centers established by the WPA during the Depression-era. Early museum exhibits included regional archaeological and ethnographic objects; artifacts; paintings by Peter Hurd and Henriette Wyeth (daughter of N.C. Wyeth); and others.

After the restructuring of the WPA in 1941, the City of Roswell assumed control of the museum. From 1952 to 1955, Vernon Hunter served as the museum director; followed by the directorship of David Gebhard from 1955 to 1961; and Joseph M. Stuart from 1961 to 1964.

By 1986, museum attendance reached over 45,000 visitors yearly. From 1967 to 2002, the Roswell Museum oversaw the operation of the Roswell Artist-in-Residence (RAiR) program.

The museum has been accredited by the American Alliance of Museums since 1978.

== Collections and exhibition galleries ==
The Roswell Museum’s permanent collection features a historical collection, and a visual art collection. The historical collection includes the American West historical collection, Native American collection, Spanish colonial historical items, and the liquid-propellant rocketry collection. The visual art collection includes regional art, modernist works from Santa Fe and Taos; 20th-century artworks, Southwestern Art; Peter Hurd and Henriette Wyeth Collection; contemporary art, international print collection; WPA-era art; decorative arts; and landscape artists. A donor program brought in works by Georgia O'Keeffe, Marsden Hartley, Stuart Davis, John Marin, and others.

=== Goddard Galleries ===
Esther Goddard gifted the museum with one of its most significant historical collections, Dr. Robert H. Goddard's material research on liquid-fuel rockets. In 1959, the museum added a new wing dedicated to Goddard, and includes a reproduction of his laboratory. Goddard's rocket tower now stands in the museum's courtyard. The Robert H. Goddard exhibit contains a Moon rock donated by Harrison Schmitt from the 1972 Apollo 17 Mission.

=== Rogers Aston Gallery ===
In 1980, the museum received a collection of western art and historical artifacts donated by Rogers and Mary Ellen Aston which prompted the opening of the wing named, the Rogers Aston Gallery of American Indian and Western Art.

== See also ==
- Anderson Museum of Contemporary Art
- Roswell Artist-in-Residence Compound
