= Midway, New Mexico =

- Census-designated place
- Location within New Mexico
- Coordinates: 33°17′45″N 104°27′06″W
- Country: United States
- State: New Mexico
- County: Chaves

Area
  - Total: 2.49 sq mi (6.44 km^{2})
  - Land: 2.49 sq mi (6.44 km^{2})
  - Water: 0.0039 sq mi (0.01 km^{2})
- Elevation: 3,573 ft (1,089 m)

Population (2020)
  - Total: 818
  - Density: 329.2/sq mi (127.09/km^{2})
- Time zone: UTC-7 (Mountain (MST))
  - Summer (DST): UTC-6 (MDT)
- ZIP code: 88230
- Area code: 575
- FIPS code: 35-48480
- GNIS feature ID: 2629119

Midway is an unincorporated community and census-designated place (CDP) in Chaves County, New Mexico. As of the 2020 census, Midway had a population of 818.

== Geography ==
Midway is located in central Chaves County 9 miles (14 km) southeast of the center of Roswell, the county seat. U.S. Route 285 forms the western edge of the CDP, leading northwest to Roswell and south 33 miles (53 km) to Artesia. New Mexico State Road 2 runs through the center of the community, joining US 285 at the CDP's northwest corner and running southeast 15 miles (24 km) to Hagerman.

According to the United States Census Bureau, the Midway CDP has a total area of 2.5 square miles (6.4 km^{2}), all land.

== Demographics ==
Historical population
Census	Pop.	Note	%±
2010	971		—
2020	818		−15.8%
U.S. Decennial Census

== Education ==
It is in the Roswell Independent School District.
