= University High School (New Mexico) =

Coordinates: 33.3163°N 104.5247°W

Location
- 25 West Martin St. Roswell, Chaves County, New Mexico 88201; United States

Information
- Type: Public High School
- School district: Roswell Independent School District
- Principal: Ramon Miramontes
- Teaching staff: 11.78 (FTE)
- Grades: 9-12
- Enrollment: 167 (2024–2025)
- Student to teacher ratio: 14.18
- Website: University High School

University High School is a public alternative high school in Roswell, New Mexico.

== See also ==
- List of high schools in New Mexico
- Roswell Independent School District
- Goddard High School
- Roswell High School
