= Glenn Dennis =

American ufologist

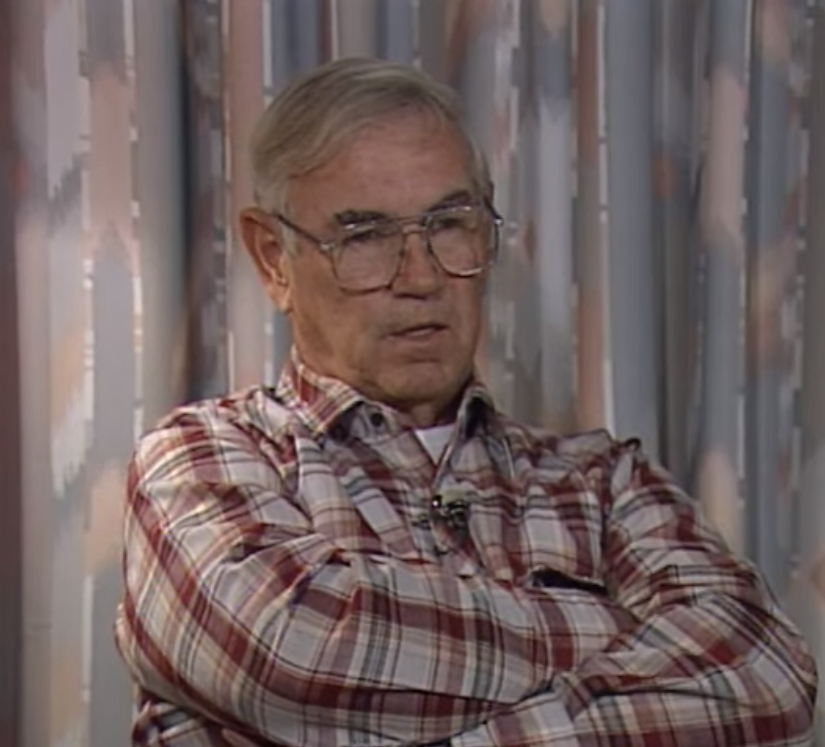
- Born: March 24, 1925; Abilene, Texas, U.S.
- Died: April 28, 2015 (aged 90); Roswell, New Mexico, U.S.

Glenn Dennis (March 24, 1925 – April 28, 2015) was a founder of the International UFO Museum and Research Center in Roswell, New Mexico.

== Early life ==
In 1940, at age 15, Dennis began working as a part-time assistant at the Ballard Funeral Home, while attending Roswell High School. After graduating high school, Dennis was excused from wartime military service due to poor hearing. Dennis commenced an apprenticeship as an embalmer at Ballard Funeral Home in 1944. He graduated from the San Francisco College of Mortuary Science on December 22, 1946. He was then put in charge of all facets of the military contract Ballard Funeral Home had with Roswell Army Air Field (RAAF), which was later renamed to Walker Air Force Base in 1948. Dennis came to the attention of UFO researchers in 1994 when he called the tips hotline after an episode of Unsolved Mysteries featuring the Roswell UFO incident.

== Analysis of witness testimony ==
Dennis’ account featured prominently in Crash at Corona, published in 1992, as well as The Truth About the UFO Crash at Roswell, published in 1994. After much public scrutiny, serious doubts about his story were soon raised.

Dennis' account is repeated in Witness to Roswell: Unmasking the 60-Year Cover-Up by Thomas Carey and Donald Schmitt. The creators of the documentary would later discover that Dennis had intentionally provided them with a fictitious name for the RAAF nurse who provided him the classified information on the crash and biological occupants. The creators noted, "His surprising and disappointing response was,... 'I gave you a phony name, because I promised her that I would never reveal it to anyone'."

The authors then comment that "Dennis was found to have knowingly provided false information to investigators, and must technically stand impeached as a witness." However, the book also notes that other witnesses "have told us that Dennis had told them about the phone calls for child-sized caskets way back when it happened" and that "Dennis had told them about his run-in at the base hospital long before Roswell became a household word."
