= Gateway Christian School =

Location
- 1900 N Sycamore; Roswell, New Mexico 88201
- Coordinates: 33°25′01″N 104°33′41″W

Information
- School type: Private
- Denomination: Nondenominational
- Established: 1981
- Years offered: Pre-K–12
- Enrollment: 446
- Color: Purple
- Tuition: $5,250
- Website: https://www.gatewaychristianschool.us/

Gateway Christian School (GCS) is a private nondenominational Christian school in Roswell, New Mexico.

Founded in 1981, the school states their own goal is "for each student to develop a personal relationship with Jesus Christ and grow in Christian maturity".

== Enrollment ==
According to Niche, Gateway Christian has 446 students. Of those 446 students, about 41% are Hispanic, 40% are White, with 19% being of other races.

Gateway Christian offers enrollment to students of pre-kindergarten through twelfth grade. They are accredited by the Association of Christian Schools.

== Awards ==
Gateway Christian was deemed as one of the best private schools in New Mexico by the Albuquerque Journal in 2024.

== Athletics ==
=== Football ===
In recent years, Gateway Christian has established themselves as relative powerhouses in the six-man football scene in New Mexico. In 2021 and 2022, they won the state title, and in 2023, placed runners-up against Roy-Mosquero.

During half-time in the 2021 championship game against Ramah High School, assistant coach Mickey Reeves, who himself was a star athlete for Roswell High School and was later selected by the Chicago Cubs in the 1991 draft, collapsed suddenly in the locker room and later died. Gateway Christian went on to win the championship game 70–28. Their 2022 season, in which they also won the championship, was dedicated to Reeves' memory.

=== Volleyball ===
The Gateway Christian volleyball team won the Class 1A championship in 2022.
