= Goddard High School (New Mexico) =

Coordinates: 33°25′28″N 104°30′48″W

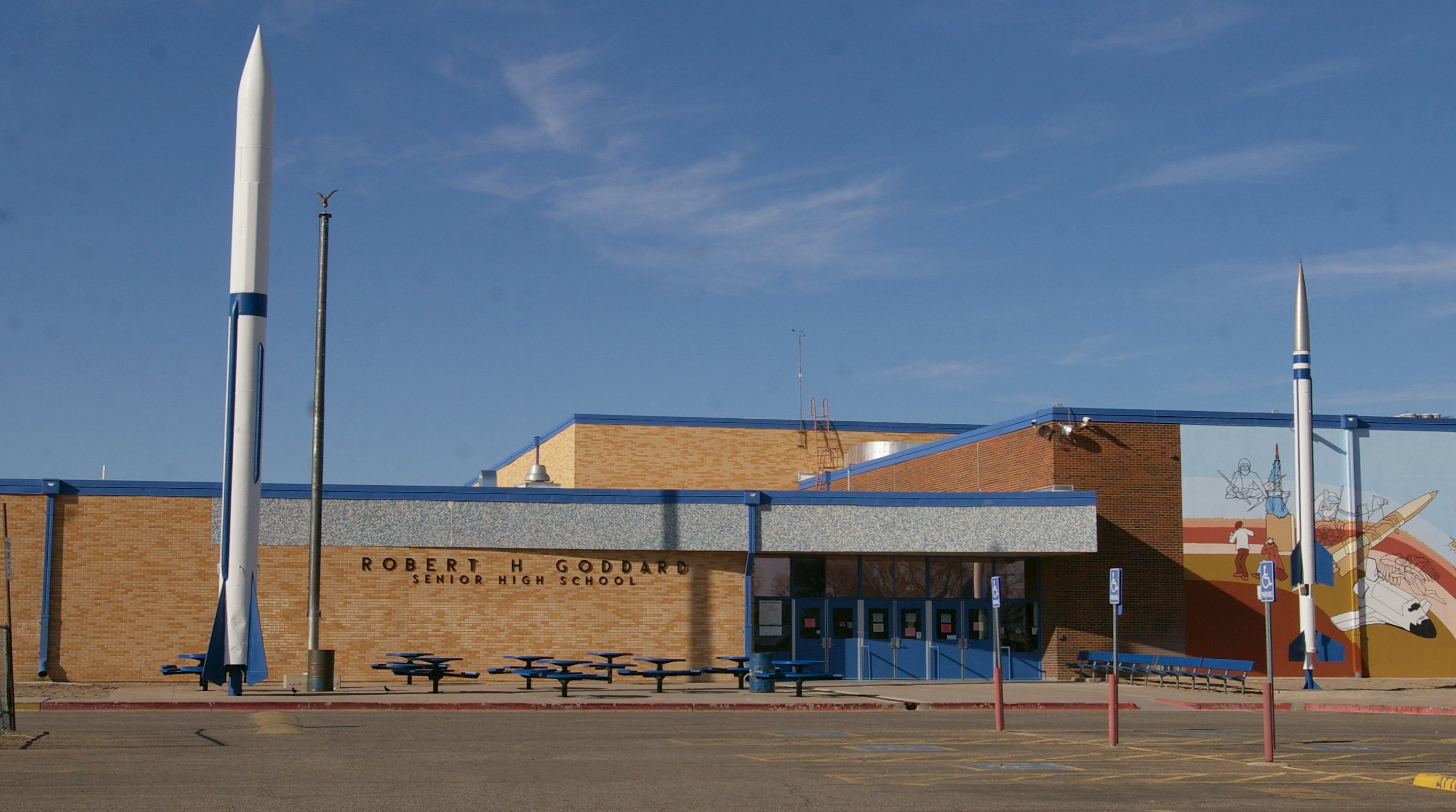

Location
- 701 East Country Club Road; Roswell, New Mexico 88201; United States

Information
- Type: Public high school
- Established: 1965
- Principal: Porter Cutrell
- Staff: 66.19 (FTE)
- Enrollment: 1,104 (2023–2024)
- Student to teacher ratio: 16.68
- Campus: Suburban
- Colors: Navy blue, Columbia blue, and white
- Athletics conference: NMAA, AAAAA Dist. 4
- Mascot: Rocket
- Rival: Roswell High School
- Website: www.risd.k12.nm.us

Robert H. Goddard High School (Goddard High School, GHS) is a public senior high school in Roswell, New Mexico, United States. It is a part of the Roswell Independent School District. Established in 1965, the school is named after rocket pioneer Robert Hutchings Goddard. The colors of GHS are navy blue, Columbia blue and white, and the school mascot is the Rocket.

== History ==
The majority of classrooms at GHS are located underground. The school was completed in 1965 at the height of the Cold War. Walker Air Force Base, located on the south side of Roswell, was considered a major target for Soviet ballistic missiles. The classrooms were built underground so that the school could serve as a bomb shelter in the event of nuclear war. The gymnasiums, cafeteria, auditorium, and other larger rooms were built above ground, on top of the classrooms.

== Academics ==
=== Student body statistics ===
Ethnicity	This school	State average
White (not Hispanic)	60%	
Hispanic (of any race)	40%	
American Indian/Alaskan Native	1%	
African American	2%	
Pacific Islander	0%	

== Athletics ==
GHS competes in the New Mexico Activities Association, as a AAAA school in District 4. Their district includes Artesia High School and Roswell High School.

GHS has won 50 state championships since 1967.

State championships
Season	Sport	Number of championships	Year
Fall	Football	8	2012, 2009, 2008, 1997, 1993, 1991, 1989, 1967 —-State Runner Up 2013, 2011, 2007, 2006, 2002, 1999, 1998, 1994
Fall	Volleyball	12	2022, 2013, 2009, 2001, 2000, 1999, 1989, 1987, 1986, 1984, 1982, 1980
Winter	Boys' basketball	1	1988
Winter	Girls' basketball	1	2017
Spring	Baseball	5	2017, 1992, 1991, 1986, 1969
Spring	Boys' golf	10	2010, 2001, 1997, 1991, 1989, 1988, 1986, 1974, 1973, 1969
Spring	Girls' golf	18	2006, 2005, 2003, 2002, 2001, 2000, 1999, 1998, 1997, 1995, 1994, 1993, 1992, 1991, 1990, 1988, 1987
Total		50	

== Notable alumni ==
- Brandon Claussen, former MLB player (New York Yankees, Cincinnati Reds)
- Nancy Lopez (1975), professional golfer
- Gerina (Mendoza) Piller (2003), professional golfer
- JoJo Robertson, professional golfer and coach

== See also ==
- List of high schools in New Mexico
- Roswell Independent School District
- Roswell High School
- University High School
