= International UFO Museum and Research Center =

Museum in Roswell, New Mexico, U.S.

Coordinates: 33°23′37″N 104°31′23″W

International UFO Museum And Research Center
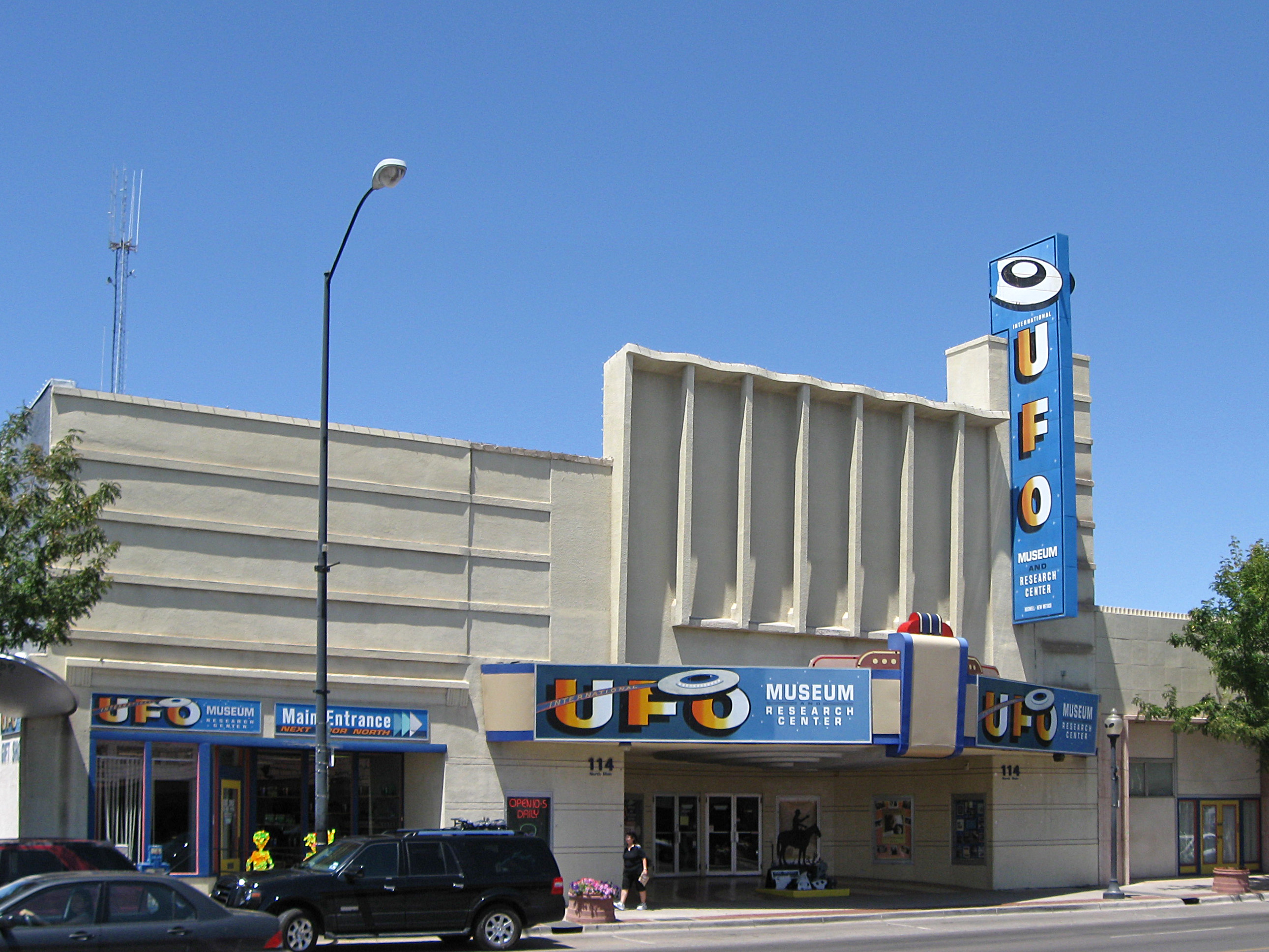
- Established: 1991
- Location: 114 N. Main St, Roswell, NM 88203, US; Roswell, New Mexico, United States
- Website: www.roswellufomuseum.com

The International UFO Museum and Research Center is located in Roswell, New Mexico, United States, in the downtown district, and is focused largely on the 1947 Roswell incident and later supposed UFO incidents in the United States and elsewhere. It was founded in 1991 as a 501c3 nonprofit educational organization and is located in a former movie theater from the 1930s. The museum contains an extensive library and exhibits all focused on the history of UFO encounters. Additionally it has an extensive library collection of UFO material and meeting room. It functions as the centerpiece of the annual UFOfest held in Roswell each year.

The catalyst for the museum was the 1947 Roswell UFO incident, in which a rancher, W. W. "Mack" Brazel, discovered metal debris outside of Roswell, near a giant trench that spanned hundreds of feet. The International UFO Museum and Research Center shares theories about the Roswell incident and other extraterrestrial life.

The museum was founded by Glenn Dennis and opened in September 1991.

The museum also has a gift store with UFO-inspired souvenirs.

== Gallery ==
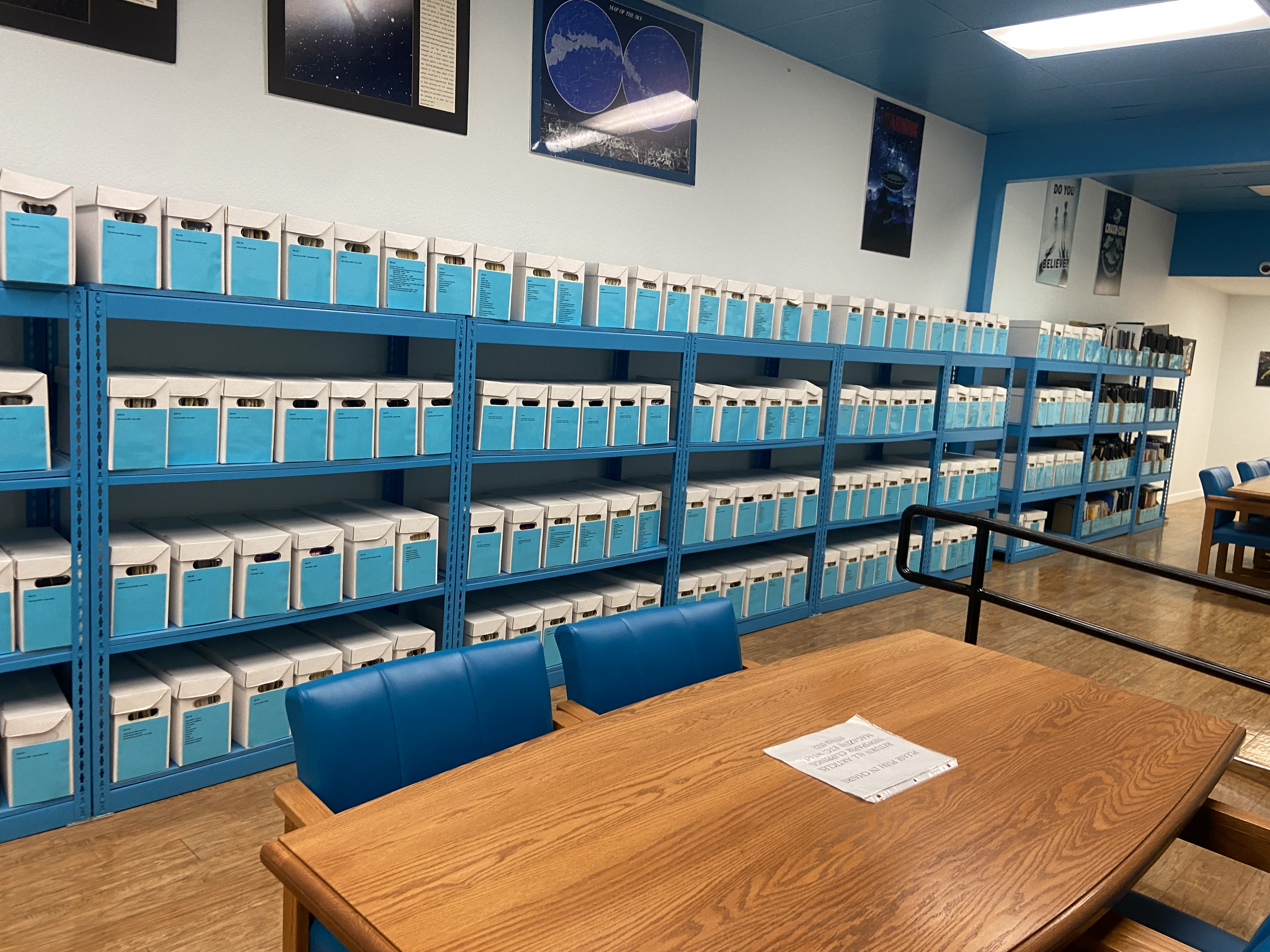
Research library

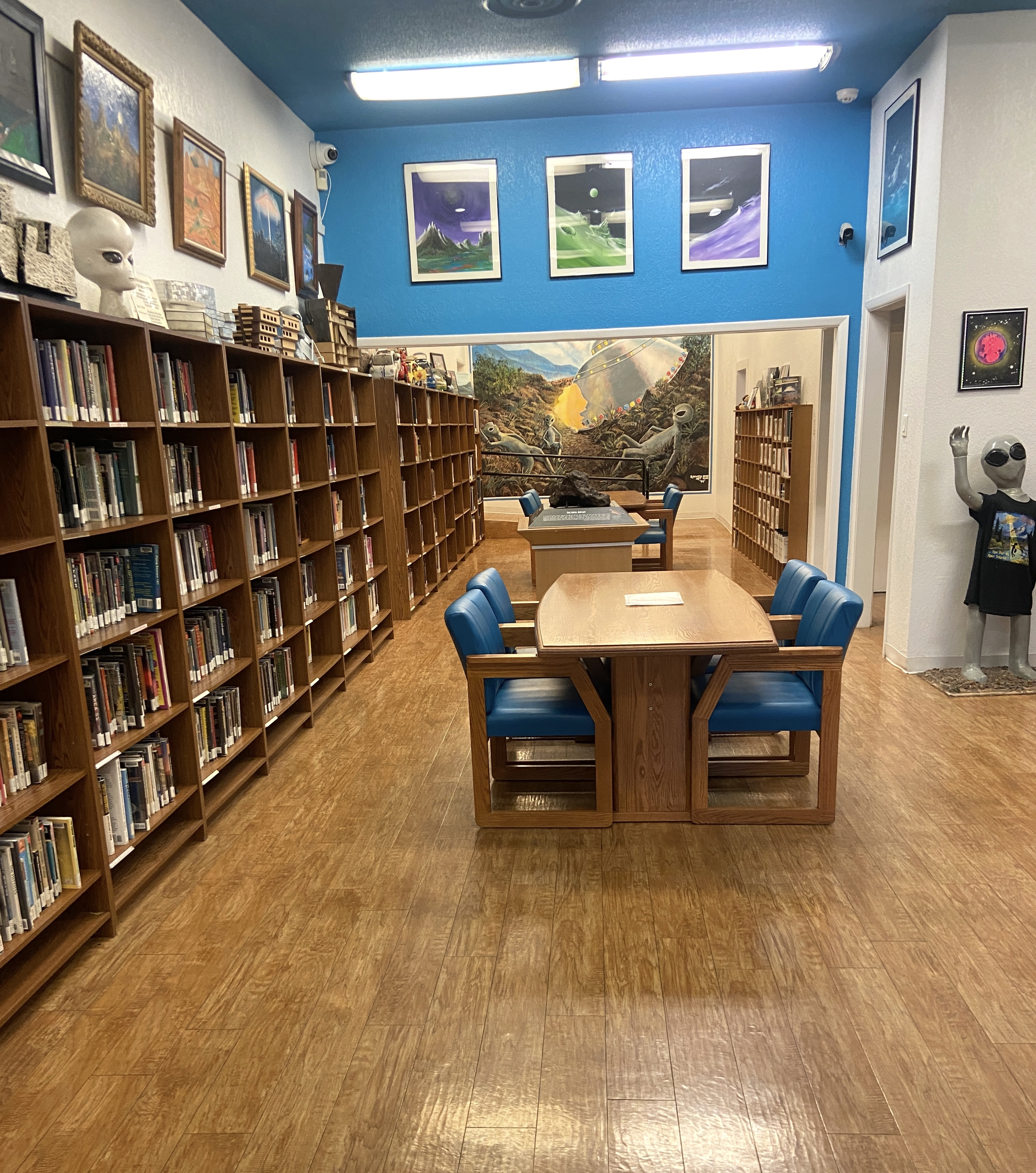
Research library

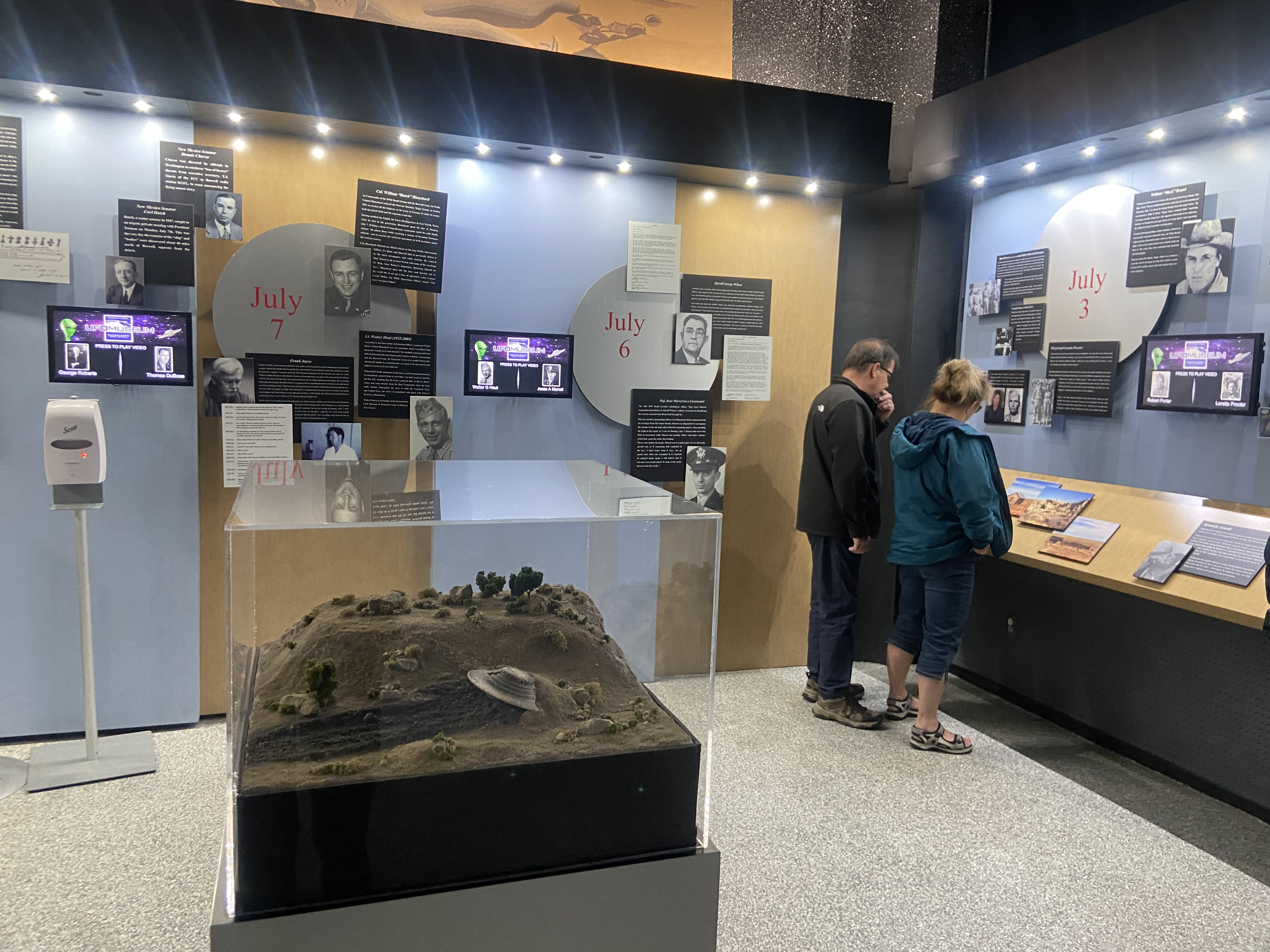
Exhibit displays

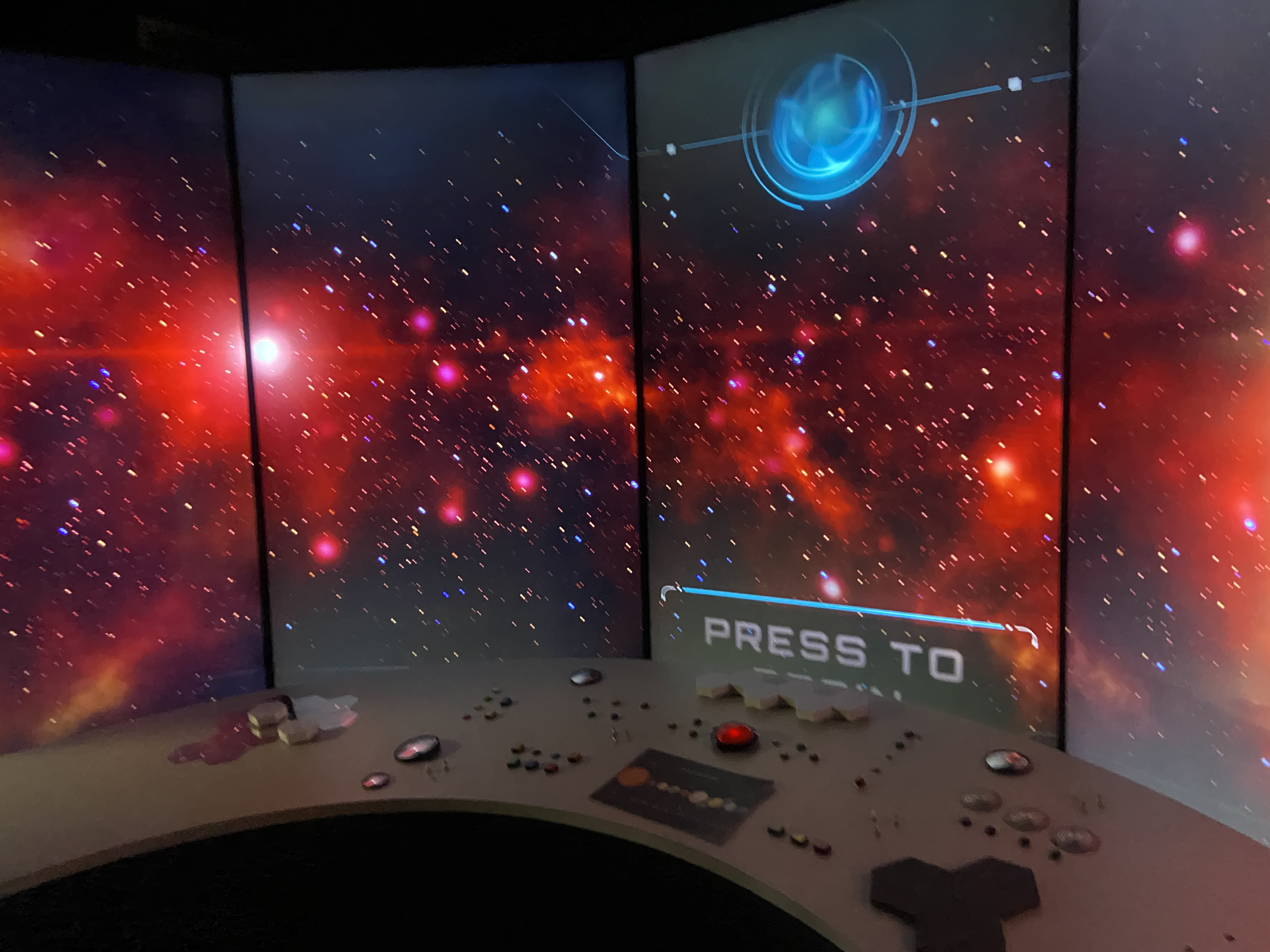
Exhibit, Immersive experience at the helm of an alien spaceship

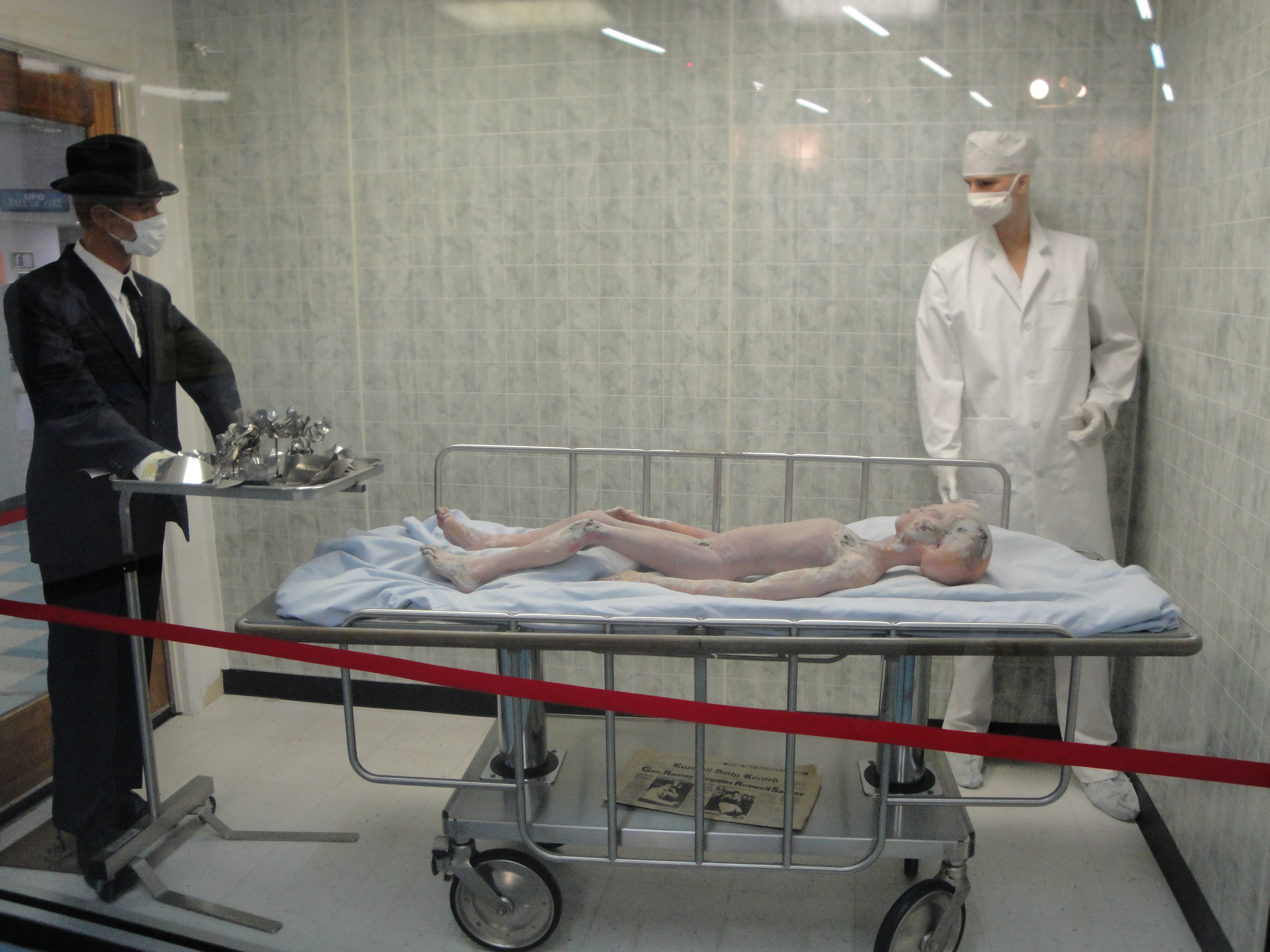
Exhibit, Alien Autopsy
