= Roswell Independent School District =

School district in New Mexico, United States

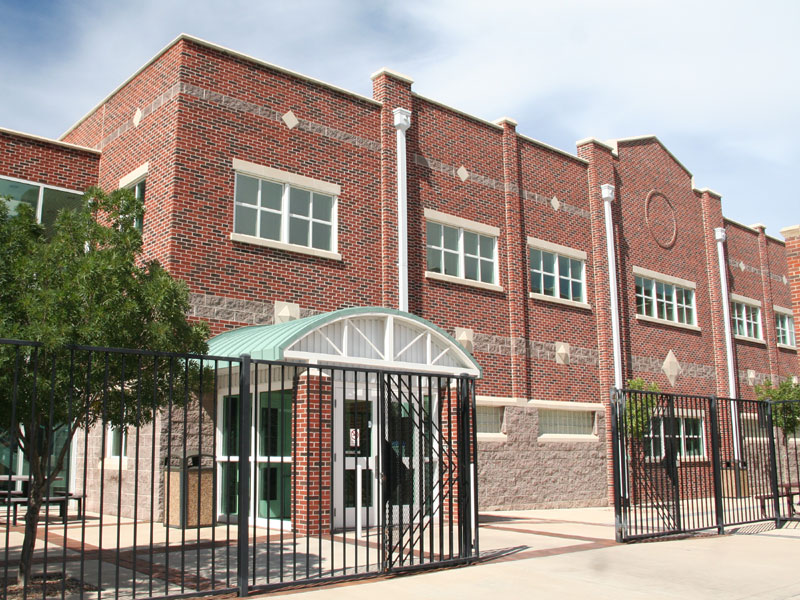

Address
- 300 North Kentucky Avenue Roswell, New Mexico, 88201; United States
- Coordinates: 33°23′45″N 104°31′41″W

District information
- Type: Public school district
- Motto: Excellence in Education; Success in Society
- Grades: P–12
- Superintendent: Brian Luck
- Schools: 21
- NCES District ID: 3502250

Students and staff
- Students: 9,801 (2020–2021)
- Teachers: 580.50 (on an FTE basis)
- Student–teacher ratio: 16.88 (on an FTE basis)

Other information
- Website: www.risd.k12.nm.us

The Roswell Independent School District is a public school district based in Roswell, New Mexico, United States.

In addition to Roswell, the district includes Midway.

== History ==
In 2018 Ann Lynn McIlroy became superintendent.

=== 2014 school shooting ===
On January 14, 2014, at about 8:10 am, a student opened fire inside the gymnasium of Berrendo Middle School. The suspect then surrendered to a staff member and was taken into police custody. A 12-year-old student and a 13-year-old student were both airlifted to a hospital in Lubbock, Texas, in critical condition. The suspected shooter was a seventh-grade 12-year-old student at the school named Mason Campbell, who used a shotgun that was smuggled into the school inside a duffle bag. Campbell faced three counts of aggravated battery with a firearm, and potential confinement in a juvenile detention facility until 21 years of age. In 2015, Campbell received the maximum sentence.

== List of schools ==
The Roswell Independent School District has twenty-one schools, including twelve elementary schools, three middle schools, four high schools, a preschool. Early College High School and University High School are alternative schools. In addition, Sidney Gutierrez Middle Schools, a K–8 charter school, is chartered with the Roswell Independent School District.

School name	Grades	Enrollment (2020–2021)	Website
Berrendo Elementary School	P–5	284	
Berrendo Middle School	6–8	685	
Del Norte Elementary School	K–5	478	
Early College High School	9–12	191	
East Grand Plains Elementary School	P–5	211	
El Capitan Elementary School	P–5	389	
Goddard High School	9–12	1,145	
Mesa Middle School	6–8	457	
Military Heights Elementary School	P–5	389	
Missouri Avenue Elementary School	P–5	308	
Monterrey Elementary School	K–5	434	
Mountain View Middle School	6–8	568	
Nancy Lopez Elementary School	P–5	203	
Parkview Early Literacy Center	Preschool	197	
Pecos Elementary School	P–5	317	
Roswell High School	9–12	1,427	
Sidney Gutierrez Middle School	K–8	196	
Sierra Middle School	6–8	671	
Sunset Elementary School	P–5	279	
University High School	9–12	102	
Valley View Elementary School	P–5	500	
Washington Avenue Elementary School	P–5	370	
