= Roswell High School (New Mexico) =

Coordinates: 33°22′17″N 104°31′39″W

Location
- 500 West Hobbs Street; Roswell, New Mexico 88203; United States

Information
- Type: Public high school
- Established: 1913
- Principal: Rosalba Mendoza
- Staff: 80.66 (FTE)
- Enrollment: 1,460 (2023–2024)
- Student to teacher ratio: 18.10
- Campus type: Suburban
- Colors: Dark Crimson, White, and Black
- Athletics conference: NMAA, AAAAA Dist. 4
- Mascot: Coyote
- Rival: Goddard High School
- Website: www.risd.k12.nm.us

Roswell High School (RHS) is a public senior high school in Roswell, New Mexico. It is a part of the Roswell Independent School District. Established in 1913, it is the oldest public high school in the city. The colors of RHS are: Dark Crimson Red, White and Black, their mascot is a Coyote. Enrollment at the school currently stands at 1,311.

== Academics ==
=== Student body statistics ===
Ethnicity	This school	State average
White (not hispanic)	27%	29%
Hispanic (of any race)	68%	56%
American Indian/Alaskan Native	<1%	11%
African American	4%	3%
Pacific Islander	1%	1%

== Athletics ==
RHS competes in the New Mexico Activities Association, a AAAAA school in District 4. Their district includes Artesia High School, Goddard High School and Lovington High School.

RHS has captured several state championships since 1914.

State Championships
Season	Sport	Year
Fall	Football	2024, 2019, 2018, 2000, 1988, 1987, 1955, 1953
Fall	Volleyball	2006, 1993, 1977, 1976
Fall	Boys, Soccer	2013
Winter	Boys, Basketball	2017, 2014, 2010, 2009, 1964, 1963, 1952, 1927, 1926
Winter	Boys, Swimming and Diving	1961
Spring	Baseball	1966, 1964, 1960
Spring	Boys, Track & Field	1919, 1918, 1915, 1914
Spring	Girls, Track & Field	1989
Spring	Dance	2005, 2006, 2007, 2008, 2009, 2012, 2013, 2014, 2015, 2016, 2017, 2018
Spring	Cheer	2013, 2012, 2011, 2010

== Notable people ==
=== Alumni ===
- Cormac Antram, Franciscan priest on the Navajo Nation, broadcaster of long-running English/Navajo radio program The Padre's Hour
- Tom Brookshier, NFL defensive back and broadcaster
- Glenn Dennis, founder of International UFO Museum and Research Center
- Pete Jaquess, NFL defensive back
- DonTrell Moore, NFL running back
- Cliff Pirtle, New Mexico state senator
- Paul Smith, NFL defensive lineman

=== Staff ===
- Eddie Reese, Olympic swimming coach (coached at Roswell High early in career now retired because Roswell High School no longer has a swimming team)

== See also ==
- List of high schools in New Mexico
- University High School
