= Roswell, New Mexico =

City in Chaves County, New Mexico, US

- City
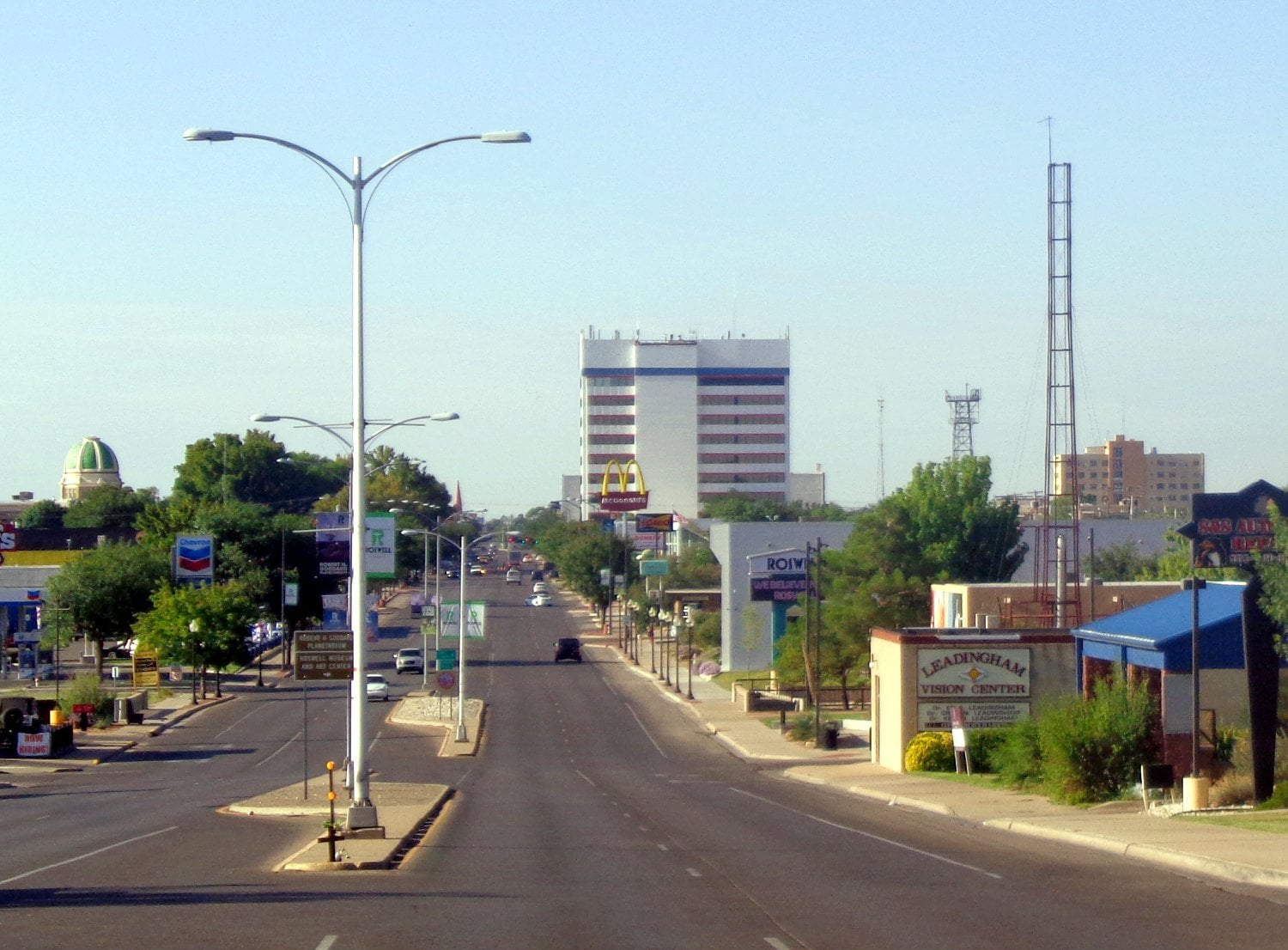
- Skyline of Roswell, looking south along Main St.

- Flag Seal

- Location of Roswell in Chaves County, New Mexico

- Location in the United States
- Coordinates: 33°23′39″N 104°31′22″W
- Country: United States
- State: New Mexico
- County: Chaves
- Founded: 1871
- Incorporated: February 25, 1889

Government
  - Mayor: Timothy Jennings (D)
  - Councilmember: Ward 1: Cristina Arnold & Juan Oropesa; Ward 2: Juliana Halvorson & Will Cavin; Ward 3: Edward Heldenbrand & Matthew Chappell; Ward 4: Robert Corn & Darrell Johnson; Ward 5: Angela Moore & Carlos Marrujo

Area
  - City: 29.776 sq mi (77.119 km^{2})
  - Land: 29.716 sq mi (76.965 km^{2})
  - Water: 0.060 sq mi (0.156 km^{2})
- Elevation: 3,615 ft (1,102 m)

Population (2020)
  - City: 48,422
  - Estimate (2024): 46,669
  - Rank: US: 856th NM: 5th
  - Density: 1,585/sq mi (612.1/km^{2})
  - Urban: 48,831
  - Metro: 63,561 (US: 146th)
- Time zone: UTC–07:00 (MST)
  - Summer (DST): UTC–06:00 (MDT)
- ZIP Codes: 88201, 88202, 88203
- Area code: 575
- FIPS code: 35-64930
- GNIS feature ID: 2411003
- Sales tax: 7.9%
- Website: roswell-nm.gov

Roswell (/ˈrɒzwɛl/ ROZ-well) is a city in and the county seat of Chaves County, New Mexico, United States. The population was 48,422 at the 2020 census, making it the fifth-most populous city in New Mexico. It is home to the New Mexico Military Institute (NMMI), founded in 1891. The city is also the location of an Eastern New Mexico University campus. Bitter Lake National Wildlife Refuge is located a few miles northeast of the city on the Pecos River. Bottomless Lakes State Park is located 12 miles (19 km) east of Roswell on US 380. Chaves County forms the entirety of the Roswell micropolitan area.

The Roswell incident in 1947 was named after the town, though the crash site of the alleged UFO was some 75 miles (121 km) north of Roswell and closer to Corona. The investigation and debris recovery were handled by the local Roswell Army Air Field. On the 50th anniversary of the Roswell incident, an annual UFO Festival was started. In the 1930s, Roswell was a site for much of Robert H. Goddard's early rocketry work. The Roswell Museum and Art Center maintains an exhibit that includes a recreation of Goddard's rocket engine development workshop, and Goddard High School is named after him.

Roswell's tourism industry is based on ufology museums and businesses, as well as alien-themed and spacecraft-themed iconography. The city also relies on New Mexico and Americana related tourism including the International UFO Museum and Research Center. Local American folk and New Mexico music performances occur near Pioneer Plaza and in parks around the city. It is a center for acequia-like irrigated farming, dairying, and ranching; it is also the location of several manufacturing, distribution, and petroleum-related facilities. Roswell has a history of minor league baseball. This regional pride has resulted in Roswell receiving the All-America City Award multiple times, in 1978–79 and 2002.

== History ==
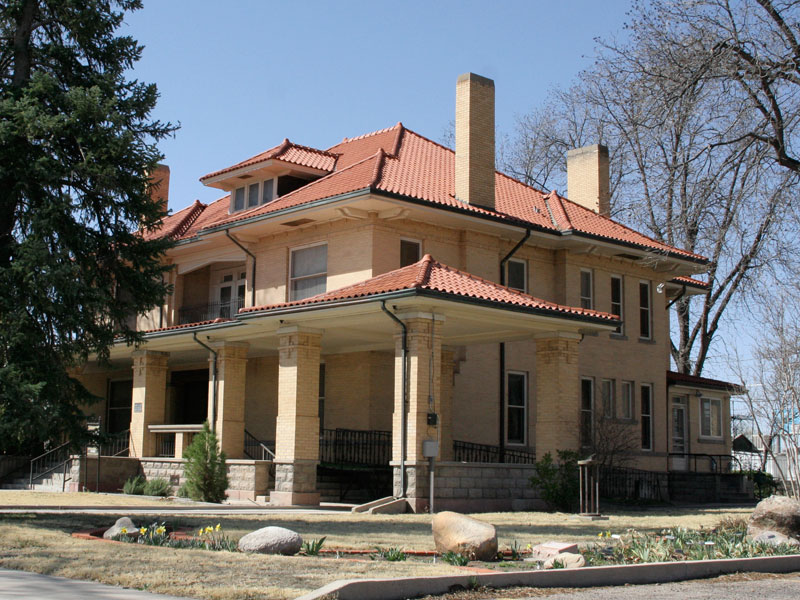
White family home, built in 1912, now a museum

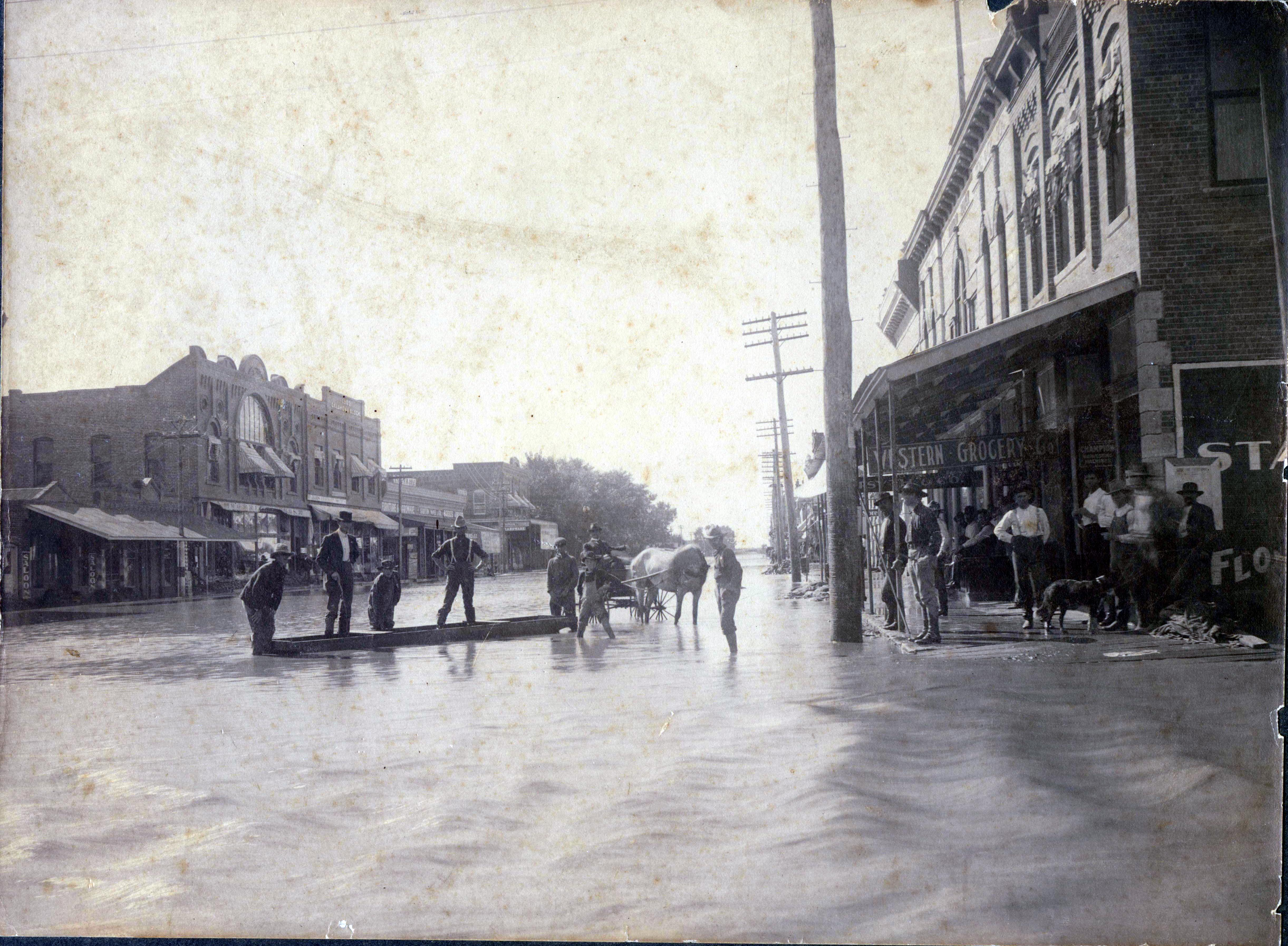
Roswell flood

The first settlers were a group of pioneers from Missouri, who attempted to start a settlement 15 miles (24 km) southwest of what is now Roswell in 1865, but were forced to abandon the site because of a lack of water. It was called Missouri Plaza. It also had many Hispanic people from Lincoln, New Mexico. John Chisum had his famous Jingle Bob Ranch about 5 miles (8 km) from the center of Roswell, at South Spring Acres. At the time, it was the largest ranch in the United States.

Van C. Smith, a businessman from Omaha, Nebraska, and his partner, Aaron Wilburn, constructed two adobe buildings in 1869 that began what is now Roswell. The two buildings became the settlement's general store, post office, and sleeping quarters for paying guests. In 1871, Smith filed a claim with the federal government for the land around the buildings, and on August 20, 1873, he became the town's first postmaster. Smith was the son of Roswell Smith, a prominent lawyer in Lafayette, Indiana, and Annie Ellsworth, daughter of U.S. Patent Commissioner Henry Leavitt Ellsworth. He called the town Roswell, after his father's first name.

In 1877, Captain Joseph Calloway Lea and his family bought out Smith and Wilburn's claim and became the owners of most of the land of Roswell and the area surrounding it. The town was relatively quiet during the Lincoln County War (1877–1879). A major aquifer was discovered when merchant Nathan Jaffa had a well drilled in his back yard on Richardson Avenue in 1890, resulting in the area's first major growth and development spurt. The growth continued when the Pecos Valley Railroad arrived in 1892.

During World War II, a prisoner-of-war camp was located in nearby Orchard Park, New Mexico. The German prisoners of war were used to do major infrastructure work in Roswell, such as paving the banks of the North Spring River. Some POWs used rocks of different sizes to create the outline of an iron cross among the stones covering the north bank. Later, the iron cross was covered with a thin layer of concrete. In the 1980s, a crew cleaning the river bed cleared off the concrete and revealed the outline once more. The small park just south of the cross was then known as Iron Cross Park. On November 11, 1996, the park was renamed POW/MIA Park. The park displays a piece of the Berlin Wall, presented to the city of Roswell by the German Air Force.

Roswell was a location of military importance from 1941 to 1967. In 1967, the Walker Air Force Base was decommissioned. After the closure of the base, Roswell capitalized on its pleasant climate and reinvented itself as a retirement community.

Roswell has benefited from interest in the alleged UFO incident of 1947. It was the report of an object that crashed in the general vicinity in June or July 1947, allegedly an extraterrestrial spacecraft and its alien occupants. Since the late 1970s, the incident has been the subject of intense controversy and of a conspiracy theory regarding a classified program named "Project Mogul". Many UFO proponents maintain that an alien craft was found and its occupants were captured, and that the military then engaged in a cover-up. In recent times, the business community has deliberately sought out tourists interested in UFOs, science fiction, and aliens.

Roswell hosted the record-breaking skydive by Felix Baumgartner on October 14, 2012.

== Geography ==
Roswell is located in the High Great Plains of southeastern New Mexico, approximately 7 mi (11 km) west of the Pecos River and some 40 mi (64 km) east of highlands that rise to the Sierra Blanca range. U.S. Routes 70, 285, and 380 intersect in the city. US 70 leads northeast 111 mi (179 km) to Clovis and 117 mi (188 km) west to Alamogordo; US 285 leads north 192 mi (309 km) to Santa Fe and south 76 mi (122 km) to Carlsbad; and US 380 leads east 134 mi (216 km) to Brownfield, Texas, and west 164 mi (264 km) to Socorro.

According to the United States Census Bureau, the city has a total area of 29.776 square miles (77.12 km^{2}), of which, 29.716 square miles (76.96 km^{2}) is land and 0.060 square miles (0.16 km^{2}), or 0.18%, is water.

=== Climate ===
Roswell is located in both the High Plains and the Chihuahuan Desert and has four distinct seasons, giving it a cold semi-arid climate (BSk) according to the Köppen climate classification. Winters are cool, but usually sunny, and snowfall can occur. Spring is mild and usually warm, but can still be cold on occasion. Summers are hot (as is common with the High Plains of New Mexico and Colorado) and average around 30 days per year when the temperature rises above 100 °F (38 °C). The North American monsoon occurs during the summer, and can bring torrential downpours, severe thunderstorms (with high winds and hail) and sometimes tornadoes. Fall is usually warm, but can be cold late in the season. Snow is possible generally from late October to March.

The record low in Roswell is −24 °F (−31 °C) on January 11, 1962, and February 8, 1933. The record high is 114 °F (46 °C) on June 27, 1994.

Climate data for Roswell, New Mexico (Roswell Air Park), 1991–2020 normals, (Note: Mean monthly maxima and minima (i.e. the expected highest and lowest temperature readings at any point during the year or given month) calculated based on data at said location from 1991 to 2020.) extremes 1893–present
Month	Jan	Feb	Mar	Apr	May	Jun	Jul	Aug	Sep	Oct	Nov	Dec	Year
Record high °F (°C)	88 (31)	91 (33)	100 (38)	102 (39)	107 (42)	114 (46)	112 (44)	111 (44)	106 (41)	99 (37)	94 (34)	84 (29)	114 (46)
Mean maximum °F (°C)	76.2 (24.6)	80.4 (26.9)	87.3 (30.7)	93.1 (33.9)	100.4 (38.0)	106.3 (41.3)	104.0 (40.0)	102.5 (39.2)	98.1 (36.7)	93.0 (33.9)	82.2 (27.9)	75.3 (24.1)	108.0 (42.2)
Mean daily maximum °F (°C)	57.3 (14.1)	63.2 (17.3)	71.0 (21.7)	79.4 (26.3)	87.8 (31.0)	96.2 (35.7)	96.5 (35.8)	94.6 (34.8)	87.6 (30.9)	77.7 (25.4)	65.7 (18.7)	56.5 (13.6)	77.8 (25.4)
Daily mean °F (°C)	42.7 (5.9)	47.8 (8.8)	55.2 (12.9)	63.2 (17.3)	72.3 (22.4)	81.0 (27.2)	83.2 (28.4)	81.6 (27.6)	74.4 (23.6)	63.2 (17.3)	51.0 (10.6)	42.4 (5.8)	63.2 (17.3)
Mean daily minimum °F (°C)	28.1 (−2.2)	32.5 (0.3)	39.4 (4.1)	47.0 (8.3)	56.7 (13.7)	65.7 (18.7)	69.9 (21.1)	68.6 (20.3)	61.2 (16.2)	48.8 (9.3)	36.3 (2.4)	28.1 (−2.2)	48.5 (9.2)
Mean minimum °F (°C)	14.4 (−9.8)	17.3 (−8.2)	23.0 (−5.0)	31.4 (−0.3)	44.0 (6.7)	55.9 (13.3)	63.2 (17.3)	61.3 (16.3)	48.8 (9.3)	32.4 (0.2)	20.0 (−6.7)	12.0 (−11.1)	9.3 (−12.6)
Record low °F (°C)	−24 (−31)	−24 (−31)	−5 (−21)	17 (−8)	27 (−3)	40 (4)	52 (11)	48 (9)	30 (−1)	14 (−10)	−6 (−21)	−10 (−23)	−24 (−31)
Average precipitation inches (mm)	0.36 (9.1)	0.35 (8.9)	0.54 (14)	0.57 (14)	1.14 (29)	1.28 (33)	1.82 (46)	1.68 (43)	1.55 (39)	1.33 (34)	0.45 (11)	0.56 (14)	11.63 (295)
Average snowfall inches (cm)	2.4 (6.1)	1.1 (2.8)	0.7 (1.8)	0.0 (0.0)	0.0 (0.0)	0.0 (0.0)	0.0 (0.0)	0.0 (0.0)	0.0 (0.0)	0.4 (1.0)	1.2 (3.0)	3.8 (9.7)	9.6 (24)
Average precipitation days (≥ 0.01 in)	3.1	2.8	3.2	2.5	3.8	4.6	6.6	7.1	6.3	5.0	2.7	3.6	51.3
Average snowy days (≥ 0.1 in)	1.5	0.8	0.4	0.1	0.0	0.0	0.0	0.0	0.0	0.3	0.5	1.6	5.2
Average relative humidity (%)	56.8	51.1	39.7	36.5	39.6	43.2	49.1	54.1	57.6	54.0	52.7	54.5	49.1
Average dew point °F (°C)	21.9 (−5.6)	23.9 (−4.5)	25.0 (−3.9)	29.8 (−1.2)	39.0 (3.9)	49.6 (9.8)	56.8 (13.8)	57.7 (14.3)	52.5 (11.4)	40.8 (4.9)	28.6 (−1.9)	21.6 (−5.8)	37.3 (2.9)
Mean monthly sunshine hours	217.1	223.0	280.8	307.6	342.9	344.7	327.9	300.9	262.7	269.6	214.5	210.3	3,302
Percentage possible sunshine	68	72	76	79	80	80	75	73	71	77	68	68	74
Source 1: NOAA (relative humidity and dew point 1973–1990, sun 1962–1982)
Source 2: NOAA

== Demographics ==
Historical population
Census	Pop.	Note	%±
1900	2,049		—
1910	6,172		201.2%
1920	7,033		14.0%
1930	11,173		58.9%
1940	13,482		20.7%
1950	25,738		90.9%
1960	39,593		53.8%
1970	33,908		−14.4%
1980	39,676		17.0%
1990	44,654		12.5%
2000	45,293		1.4%
2010	48,366		6.8%
2020	48,422		0.1%
2023 (est.)	47,109		−2.7%
U.S. Decennial Census; 2020 Census

=== Racial and ethnic composition ===
Roswell city, New Mexico – Racial and ethnic composition Note: the US Census treats Hispanic/Latino as an ethnic category. This table excludes Latinos from the racial categories and assigns them to a separate category. Hispanics/Latinos may be of any race.
Race / Ethnicity (NH = Non-Hispanic)	Pop 2000	Pop 2010	Pop 2020	% 2000	% 2010	% 2020
White alone (NH)	23,063	20,296	16,996	50.92%	41.96%	35.10%
Black or African American alone (NH)	1,020	980	826	2.25%	2.03%	1.71%
Native American or Alaska Native alone (NH)	325	313	327	0.72%	0.65%	0.68%
Asian alone (NH)	264	321	552	0.58%	0.66%	1.14%
Native Hawaiian or Pacific Islander alone (NH)	12	29	21	0.03%	0.06%	0.04%
Other race alone (NH)	26	105	191	0.06%	0.22%	0.39%
Mixed race or Multiracial (NH)	499	490	1,028	1.10%	1.01%	2.12%
Hispanic or Latino (any race)	20,084	25,832	28,481	44.34%	53.41%	58.82%
Total	45,293	48,366	48,422	100.00%	100.00%	100.00%

=== 2020 census ===
As of the 2020 census, there were 48,422 people and 11,844 families residing in the city; the population density was 1,629.5 inhabitants per square mile (629.2/km^{2}).

The median age was 35.3 years. 6.6% of residents were under 5 years of age, 27.3% were under the age of 18, and 15.9% were 65 years of age or older. For every 100 females there were 95.9 males, and for every 100 females age 18 and over there were 93.2 males age 18 and over.

97.7% of residents lived in urban areas, while 2.3% lived in rural areas.

There were 17,929 households, of which 35.6% had children under the age of 18 living in them. Of all households, 41.2% were married-couple households, 20.1% were households with a male householder and no spouse or partner present, and 30.2% were households with a female householder and no spouse or partner present. About 28.6% of all households were made up of individuals and 12.6% had someone living alone who was 65 years of age or older.

There were 20,220 housing units, of which 11.3% were vacant. The homeowner vacancy rate was 2.5% and the rental vacancy rate was 9.6%.

Racial composition as of the 2020 census
Race	Number	Percent
White	26,530	54.8%
Black or African American	1,081	2.2%
American Indian and Alaska Native	733	1.5%
Asian	596	1.2%
Native Hawaiian and Other Pacific Islander	30	0.1%
Some other race	10,137	20.9%
Two or more races	9,315	19.2%

=== Income and poverty ===
The median income for a household in the city was $48,298, and per capita income was $25,906 (2018–2022 in 2022 dollars). In 2022, 23.2% of the population was living below the poverty line.

=== 2010 census ===
As of the 2010 census, there were 48,366 people, 17,654 households, and _ families residing in the city. The population density was 1,619.9 inhabitants per square mile (625.4/km^{2}). There were 19,743 housing units. The racial makeup of the city was 69.9% White, 2.5% African American, 1.2% Native American, 0.7% Asian, 0.1% Pacific Islander, 22.1% from some other races and 3.4% from two or more races. Hispanic or Latino of any race were 53.4% of the population. 26.5% of residents were under the age of 18, _% were under 5 years of age, and 15.6% were 65 and older.

== Economy ==
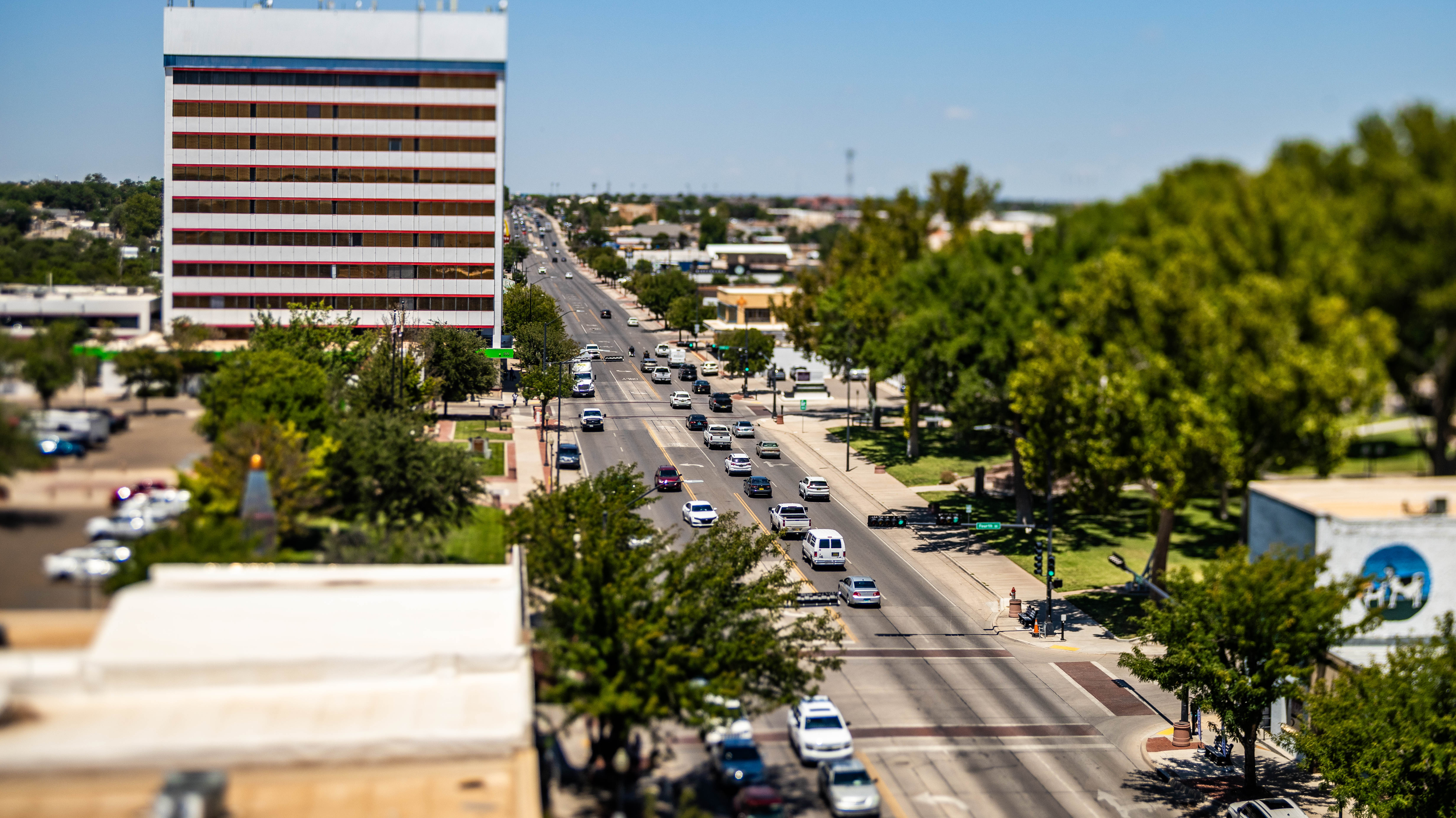
Downtown Roswell

Leprino Foods, one of the world's largest mozzarella factories, is located in Roswell.

The Transportation Manufacturing Corporation, a subsidiary of Motor Coach Industries, produced buses in Roswell starting in 1974. In 1987, General Motors sold its transit bus operations to MCI, with GM's Rapid Transit Series line being produced by TMC. The RTS production was later sold to Nova Bus in 1994. Nova Bus continued production of the RTS until 2002 when they closed the plant in Roswell. Millennium Transit Services would later acquire the Roswell plant and production of the RTS, however, that company would go defunct in 2012 and so would production of the RTS.

== Arts and culture ==
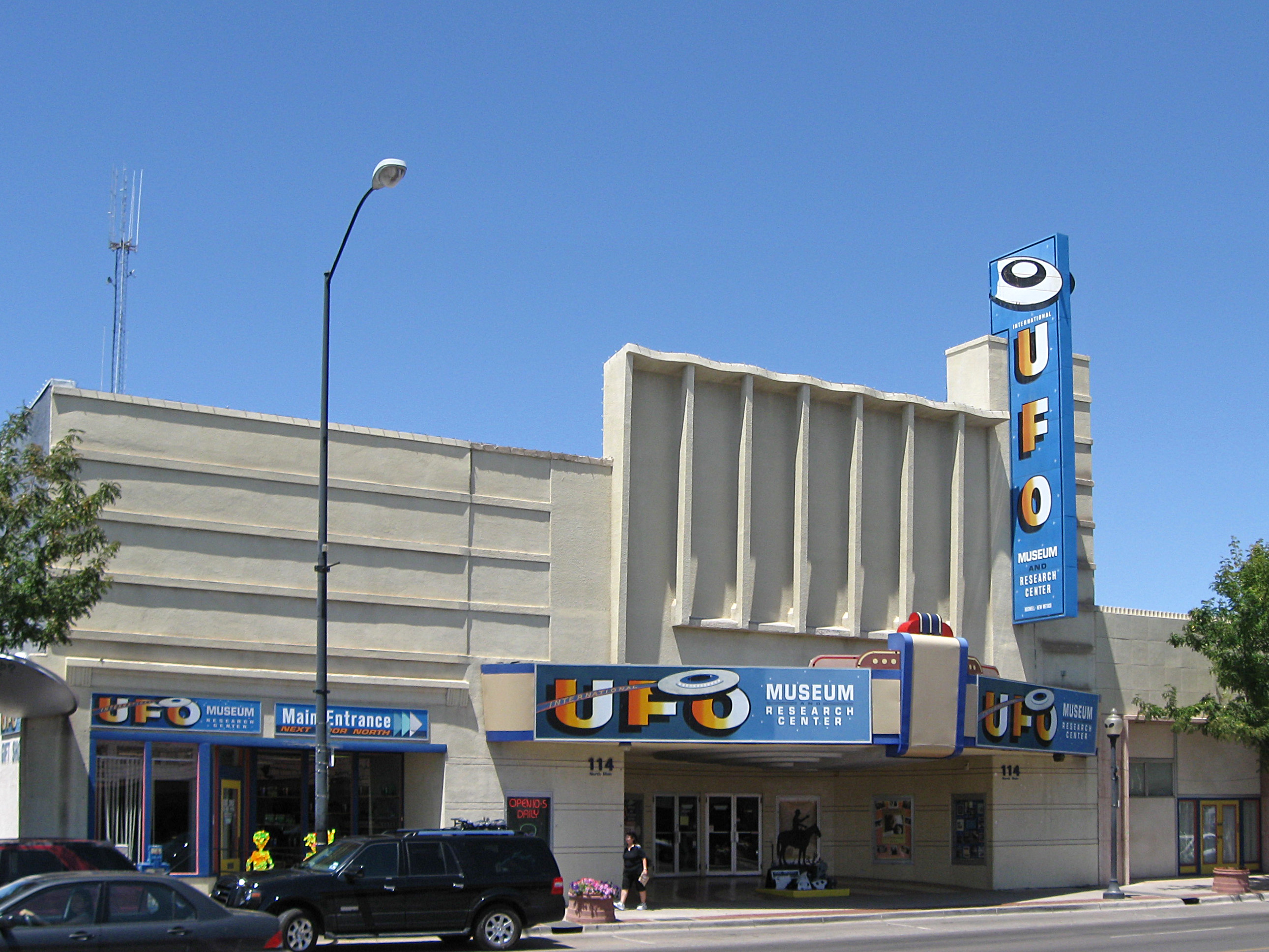
International UFO Museum

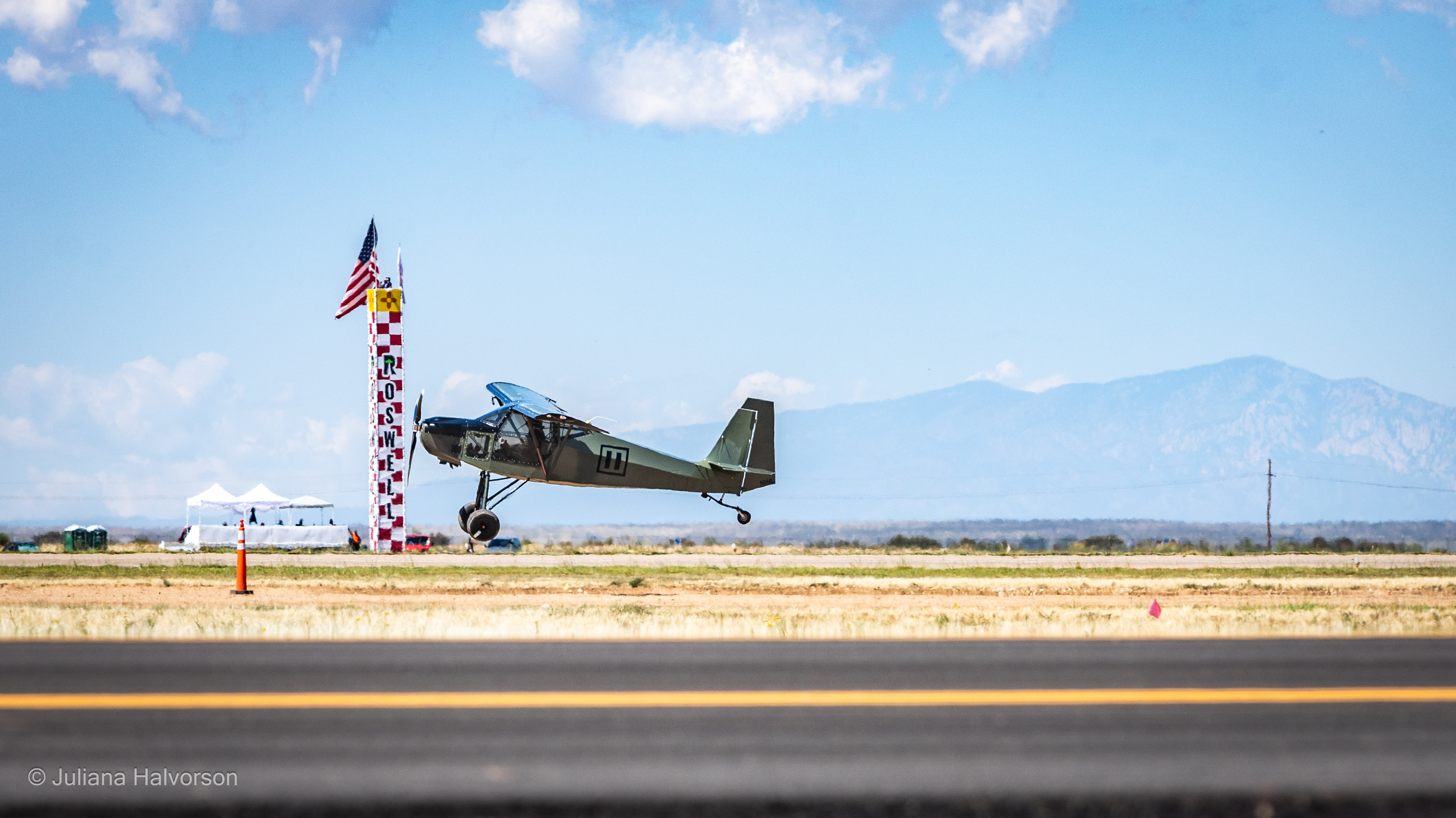
STOL Racing at NCAR

Roswell's tourism industry is based on aerospace engineering and ufology museums and businesses, as well as alien-themed and spacecraft-themed iconography. A yearly UFO festival has been held since 1995.

The Roswell Museum maintains an exhibit that includes a recreation of Goddard's rocket engine development workshop, as well as a planetarium and a collection of fine art. The Roswell Artist-in-Residence program has an associated museum, the Anderson Museum of Contemporary Art which features more than 200 artists in the collection.

== Sports ==
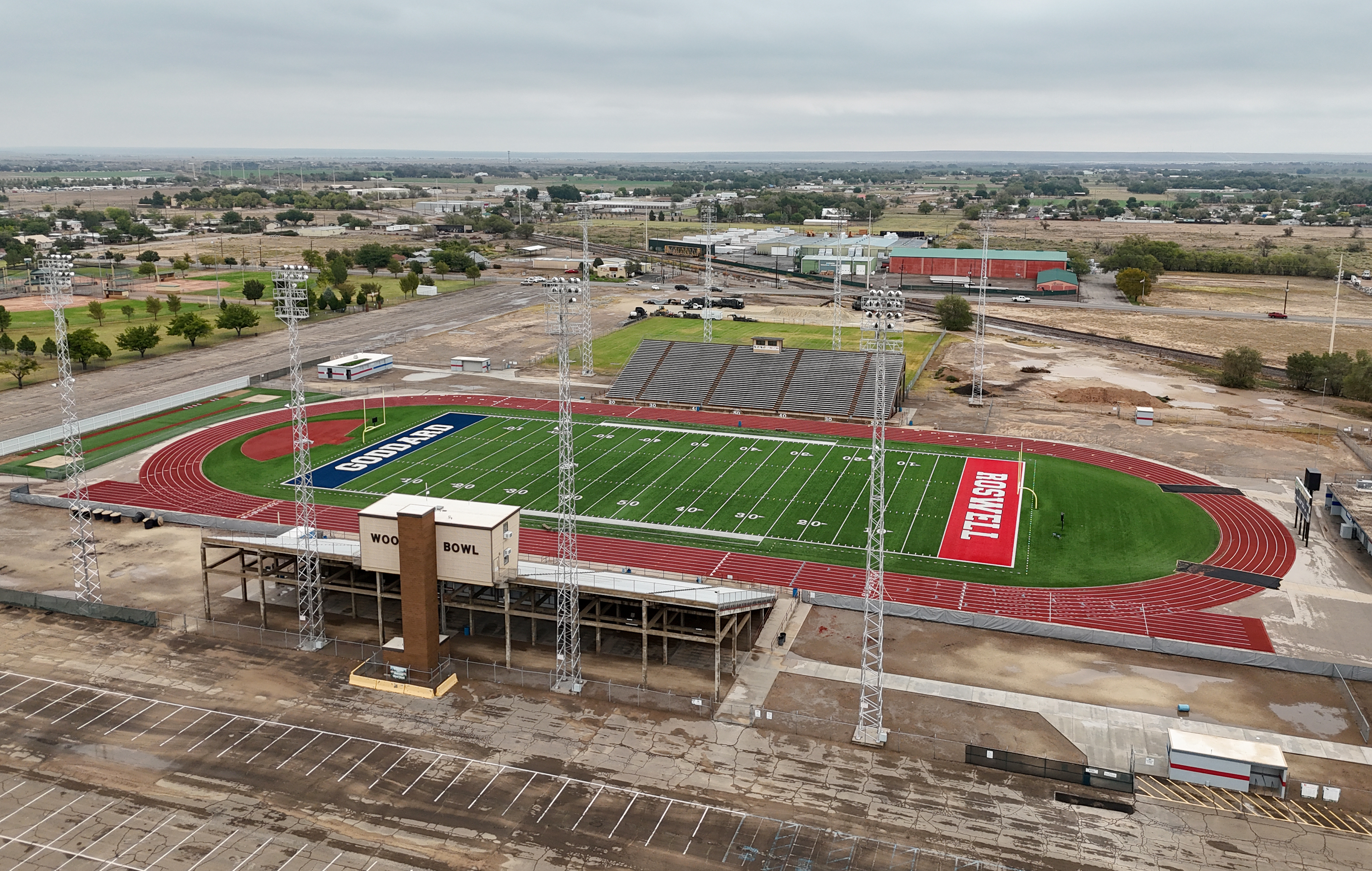
Wool Bowl stadium opened in 1968 and hosts high school games

The Roswell Invaders play in the Pecos League of professional baseball clubs. The Invaders wear lime-green uniforms to represent the city's extraterrestrial connections. Home games are played at Joe Bauman Stadium.

Previously, Roswell was home to the Roswell Giants (1923), Roswell Sunshiners (1937), Roswell Rockets (1949–1956), and Roswell Pirates (1959), who played in the Panhandle-Pecos Valley League (1923), West Texas-New Mexico League (1937), Longhorn League (1949–1955), Southwestern League (1956), and Sophomore League (1959).

Joe Bauman hit a minor-league record 72 home runs for the 1954 Roswell Rockets, and Baseball Hall of Fame inductee Willie Stargell played for the 1959 Roswell Pirates. Roswell was an affiliate of the Pittsburgh Pirates in 1959.

Roswell has hosted the National Championship Air Races, which are held at the Roswell Air Center, since 2025.

== Education ==
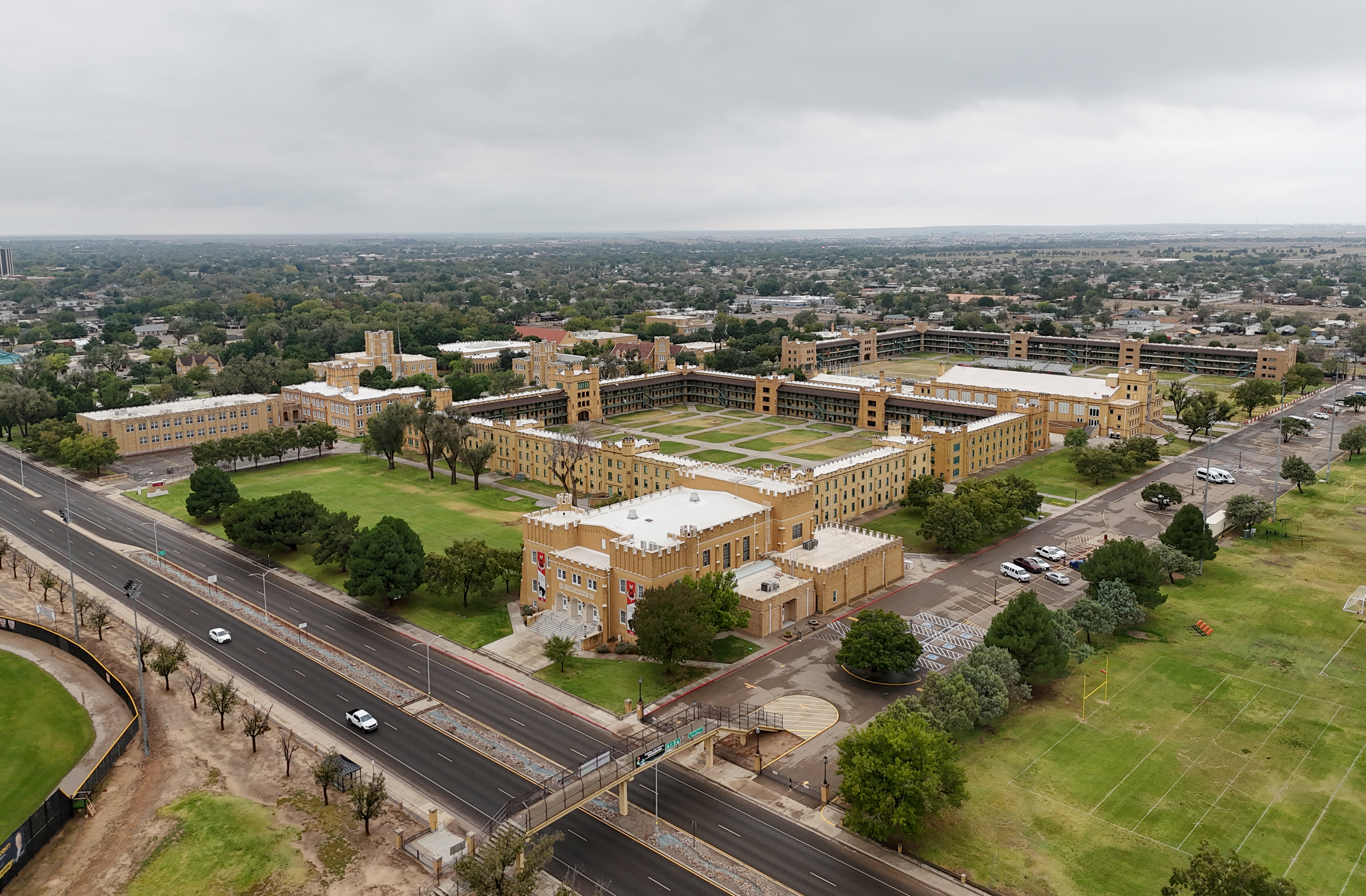
The state-operated New Mexico Military Institute campus in Roswell

=== Public schools ===
- Roswell Independent School District
  - Goddard High School
  - Roswell High School
- Mountain View Middle School
- Mesa Middle School
- Sierra Middle School
- Berrendo Middle School

=== Private schools ===
- All Saints Catholic School, a pre-K through eighth-grade Catholic school
- Gateway Christian School, a pre-K through high school parochial school
- Immanuel Lutheran School, a Junior Kindergarten through 9th grade classical school
- Saint Andrews Catholic School, a K-6 Catholic School

=== Colleges and universities ===
- Eastern New Mexico University-Roswell is a branch of Eastern New Mexico University (headquartered in Portales). The Roswell campus offers several certificate and associate programs. Also, bachelor's and master's programs are available via ENMU's Instructional Television System.
- New Mexico Military Institute offers four-year high school and two-year associate college-degree programs.

== Infrastructure ==
=== Transportation ===
==== Airport ====
- Roswell International Air Center is served by an American Eagle flight to Dallas-Fort Worth and began United Express service to Denver on February 17, 2026.

==== Bus ====
- Roswell Transit operates local services including a fixed route on Main Street, as well as Dial-a-ride services to and from Pecos Trails Transit Center and an Airport Shuttle service.

==== Major highways ====
- U.S. Route 70
- U.S. Route 285
- U.S. Route 380

==== Railroads ====
- BNSF Railway freight services

== Notable people ==
- Robert O. Anderson, businessman and philanthropist
- Bobby Baldock, U.S. federal appellate judge (Tenth Circuit Court of Appeals)
- Tom Brookshier, professional football player and sportscaster
- John Chisum, pioneer, landowner, rancher
- Louise Holland Coe, first woman elected to the New Mexico Senate, first woman to run for U.S. Congress, 1894–1985
- Max Coll, 15-term New Mexico House Representative (1966–1970, 1980–2004), grandson of James F. Hinkle
- Ray Crawford, combat pilot and auto racer
- John Denver, singer and actor
- Pat Garrett, sheriff, killer of Billy the Kid
- Robert H. Goddard, rocket pioneer
- Susan Graham, opera singer
- J.J. Hagerman, businessman and railroad developer
- James F. Hinkle, Mayor of Roswell (1904–06), New Mexico State Senator (1912–1916), Governor of New Mexico (1923–25)
- Nancy Lopez, LPGA Hall of Fame golfer
- Jody McCrea, actor
- Demi Moore, actress
- Gerina Piller, professional golfer
- Priscilla Presley, actress and businesswoman
- Clinton A. Puckett, 6th Sergeant Major of the Marine Corps, Navy Cross recipient
- James P. Riseley, Lieutenant General, USMC
- Austin St. John, first Red Power Ranger

== See also ==
- Llano Estacado – Region in the southwestern United States in New Mexico and Texas
- Roswell – 1999 American science fiction TV series
